= La Becquée =

French novel

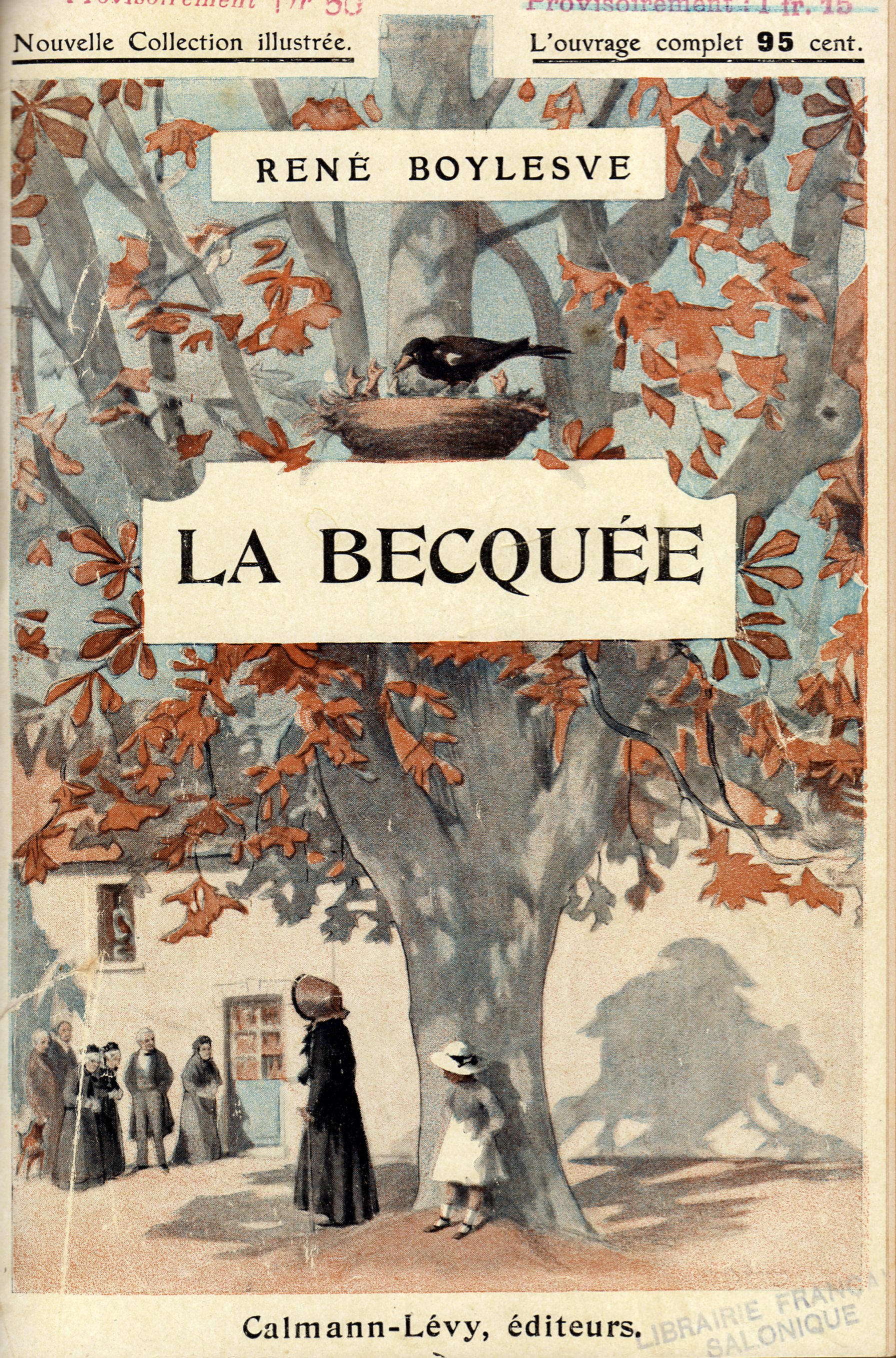
- Cover of the 1910 edition (after a watercolor by Adolphe Gumery).
- Author: René Boylesve
- Genre: Novel of manners
- Publisher: La Revue Blanche
- Publication date: 1901
- Publication place: France
- Pages: 293

La Becquée (French pronunciation: [la bɛke]) by René Boylesve is a novel of manners in the French tradition. The novel is largely autobiographical and was first published in book form in 1901, following its serialization the previous year.

The narrator, a young child, provides a detailed account of the lives and occasionally complex relationships of members of a family gathered around his great-aunt Félicie on a vast estate in southern Touraine during the post-Franco-Prussian War period of 1870. The elderly woman's entourage exploits her hospitality, receiving "la becquée" (handouts) in the form of lodging, sustenance, and other benefits. The aunt willingly supports this arrangement, despite her awareness of her own deteriorating health and impending demise. She perceives that her relatives' emotional response to this imminent loss is less profound than their practical concerns. Félicie instills in young Riquet a deep appreciation for the land that sustains them and equips him with the knowledge and skills to manage the estate, with the hope of ensuring its continued prosperity after his adulthood.

The regional and realistic setting of the work ultimately holds little significance, as the novel could be set in any region. The setting provides the author with an opportunity to explore character studies, with Aunt Félicie as the central figure, who lives solely by and for her land. Additionally, the book offers an analysis, which is occasionally satirical, of the morals of the petite bourgeoisie of the time. The choice of a five-year-old child as the narrator, who describes without interpreting, provides greater depth to this study and encourages the reader to take on a more active role.

A sequel to the novel, entitled L'Enfant à la balustrade, was published in 1903.

== Summary ==
The epigraph to the first chapter, which is a quote from Jacques Amyot, provides the reader with an explanation of the novel's title. (Note: Epigraph of the first chapter of La Becquée: Like little birds who cannot yet fly, and who always wait, beak open, for others to feed them. — Jacques Amyot, Comment ouïr)

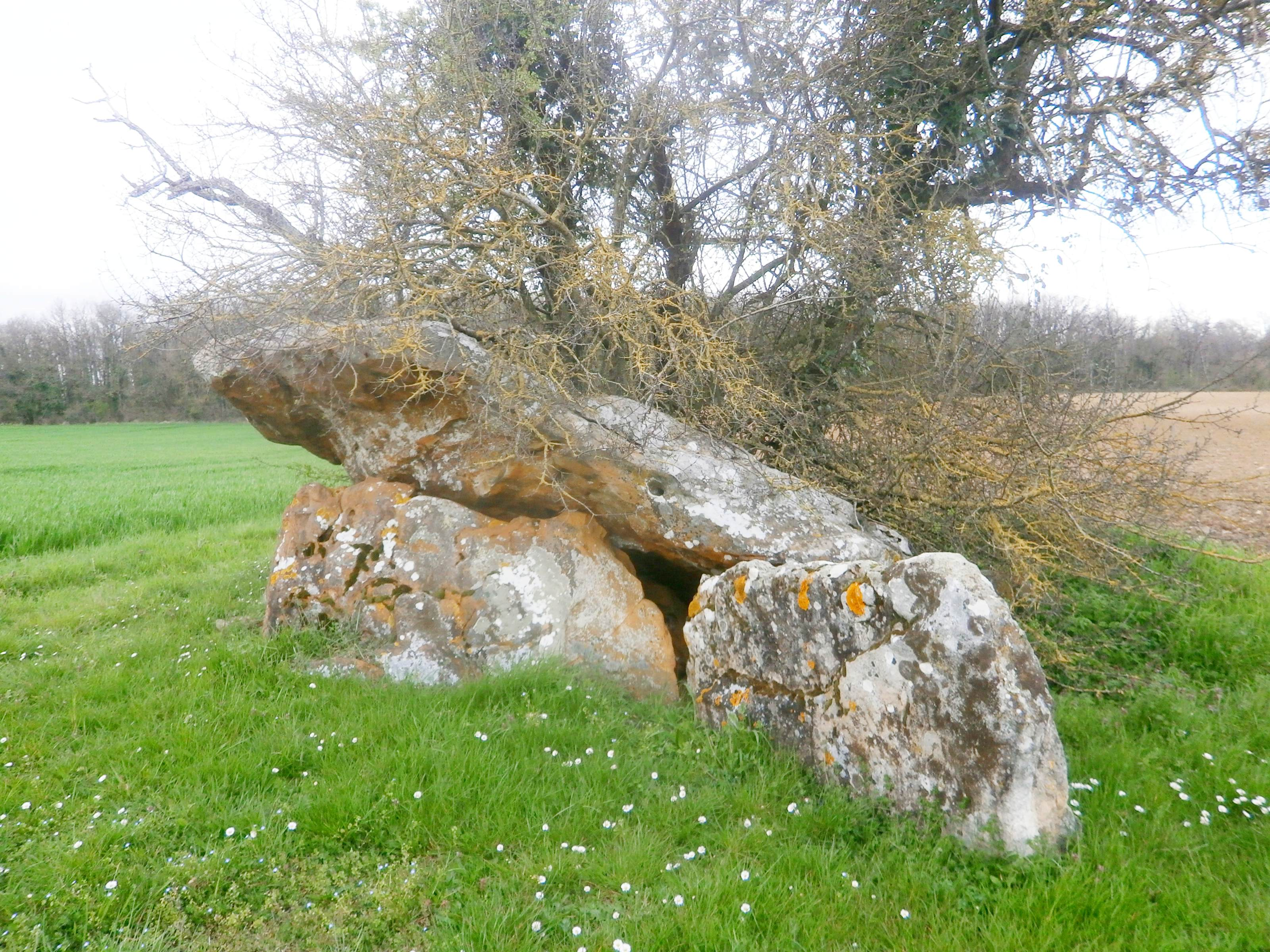
"Chillou du Feuillet", Descartes, bordering Marcé-sur-Esves.

In southern Touraine, towards the conclusion of the 1870 war—the novel is set between January 1871 and June 1876 (Note: Trémouilloux 2010, p. 163)—after the death of his mother, Henri Nadaud, nicknamed Riquet, relocates to the expansive Courance farmstead. His father, preoccupied with his notary practice, maintains his residence in the nearby town. In this environment, the young child observes and recounts the activities of his family, which is dominated by the strong personality of his great-aunt Félicie, who owns the 400-hectare estate centered around the main farm. Félicie introduces her grandnephew to the management of the estate through long walks, during which they frequently stop by a dolmen. However, this "inheritance aunt" is afflicted with a terminal illness, which causes concern among the numerous dependents she supports, who have become reliant on her financial assistance and have been shaped by her guidance. Furthermore, her brother-in-law Casimir displays an inability to effectively manage financial assets. He exhibits a troubling tendency to engage in risky investments and financial missteps. For example, he asserts that he can purchase and oversee the management of a mill and surrounding lands in the vicinity of Courance, which Félicie had previously been unable to obtain. This venture is likely to prove similarly unsuccessful for him. Casimir's son, Philibert, an artist and idealist who makes a meagre living in Paris, lives with a milliner and has a daughter with her. When the family's concerns become more explicit, focusing on their future rather than Félicie's health, and when discussions on dividing the anticipated inheritance begin openly, Félicie cuts them short, stating, "You will have food."

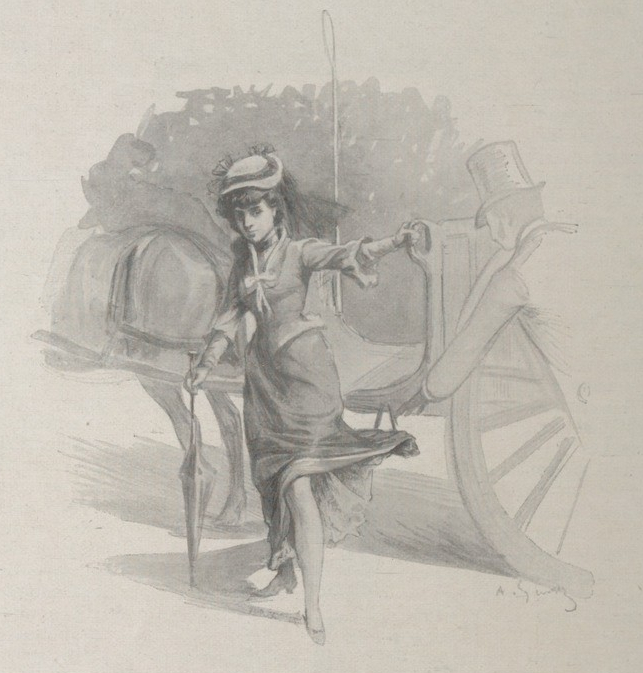
"La Créole" arriving in Courance.

Moreover, Riquet's father contemplates remarrying a Creole woman, a Catholic but a friend of Protestant Americans, (Note: Bourgeois 1945, p. 155) which serves only to exacerbate the tensions within the family. Félicie, inclined to adhere to traditional values and reluctant to acknowledge Philibert's daughter because she was born out of wedlock, cannot accept her nephew's plans. For her, as for her sister, the mother of Me Nadaud, marriages must take place within the same social class and, if possible, among people of the same geographical origin. She espouses the prevailing attitudes of the time, which regarded Creole women as "women who spend their lives in hammocks, smoke, are unclean, and don't know how to run a household."

Only when Félicie becomes aware of the gravity of her condition she begins to display affectionate behavior that had previously been concealed. She dies shortly thereafter, followed closely by her husband, whose attachment to his wife was not previously apparent. Additionally, he had a daughter with one of their tenant farmers. (Note: Bourgeois 1945, p. 157) Unable to cope with Félicie's demise, despite their contrasting personalities, he takes his own life with a shotgun. Riquet becomes the sole heir to the estate, with the obligation for his father, the usufructuary, to provide an annuity for each family member. Courance is thus safeguarded from any risk of division, at least until the child reaches adulthood, and all of Félicie's dependents "will have food."

L'Enfant à la balustrade, published in 1903, constitutes a sequel to La Becquée.

== Main characters and traits ==
In his writing, Boyle does not provide a comprehensive physical description of his characters. Instead, he employs a technique similar to that used by Prosper Mérimée, whereby he introduces hints about each character's appearance throughout the text, allowing the reader to gradually construct an understanding of their physical characteristics. Similarly, Boyle does not offer an explicit analysis of his characters. Instead, he presents the reader with elements they can use to draw their conclusions. (Note: Bourgeois 1945, p. 147)

The narrator, Henri "Riquet" Nadaud, is identified with René Boylesve at the same age. He plays a minimal role in the action and is primarily a passive observer of the events he describes. However, his perspective does emerge intermittently, particularly in the novel's second part, as the child matures and develops a more nuanced understanding of the world. (Note: Lefort 1949, p. 113)

Félicie Planté, Riquet's great-aunt and the proprietress of Courance, oversees the estate with an iron fist and is the novel's central figure, inextricably linked to the estate itself, which could also be considered a "main character." Everything in the novel revolves around her; it's through her that the family gathered at Courance exists, and thanks to her they can survive. (Note: Bourgeois 1945, pp. 149–150) Her attachment to material wealth is accompanied by a certain skepticism toward religious dogma.

Casimir Fantin, Félicie's brother-in-law and Riquet's grandfather, is an "adventurer" who is wholly unlike his sister-in-law. His cheerful disposition and perpetual carefreeness imbue the family with a certain levity, counterbalancing the otherwise austere tone of their lives. (Note: Lefort 1949, p. 116) (Note: Bourgeois 1945, p. 149) In Les Bonnets de dentelle, the character Adolphe, Casimir's counterpart, is described by Boylesve as an "unstoppable clumsy man, incorrigible powder-inventor, brilliant fool", traits that bear resemblance to those of René Boylesve's grandfather. (Note: Julien Boilesve was imprisoned for debt after a bankruptcy, even though his sister-in-law Clémence ("Félicie") had repaid part of his debts; Louise ("Célina"), Julien’s wife, then had to give up her shares in the Barbotinière estate ("Courance") to her sister Clémence.)

Me Nadaud, Riquet's father and a notary, plays a relatively minor role in the novel, making only sporadic appearances. Riquet even refers to him as "the notary" when describing him at work. Nevertheless, his plan to remarry after his wife's death represents one of the novel's significant societal shifts. (Note: Bourgeois 1945, p. 154)

Philibert Fantin, the son of Casimir and an idealistic artist with a heart of gold, exemplifies a profound sense of familial obligation by expressing a desire to marry his child's mother. This is a stark contrast to the more calculated values espoused by the other characters, who label him a "deviant." However, Félicie, at a later stage in life, develops a closer bond with him, even attempting to persuade him, with limited success, to assume a role in the leadership of Courance. (Note: Bourgeois 1945, p. 153)

M. Laballue, a distant relative and friend of Félicie who arouses jealousy in her husband, is a former lawyer. Nicknamed "Sugar Candy", a sobriquet identical to that of M. Bréchard, his model, he acquired this epithet due to his ability to tolerate Félicie's demeanor with equanimity in all situations. He exerts a profound influence over her; she places unreserved trust in him, even delegating her autonomy to him. (Note: Lefort 1949, p. 117)

== Long gestation ==
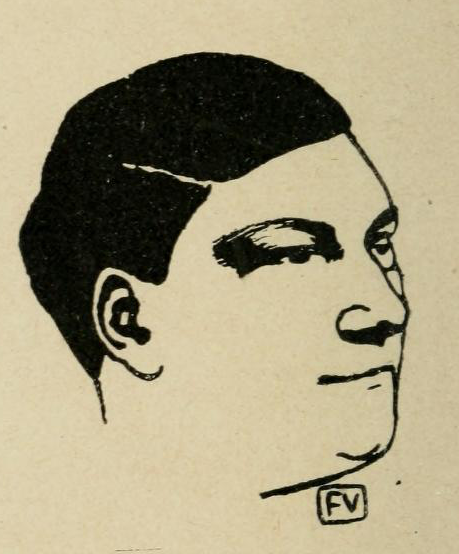
Hugues Rebell, by Félix Vallotton (c. 1898).

In the early 1890s, René Boylesve was encouraged by his friend Hugues Rebell to publish a book based on his childhood experiences in southern Touraine. This resulted in the publication of two books: La Becquée, followed by L'Enfant à la balustrade. (Note: Trémouilloux 2010, p. 159)

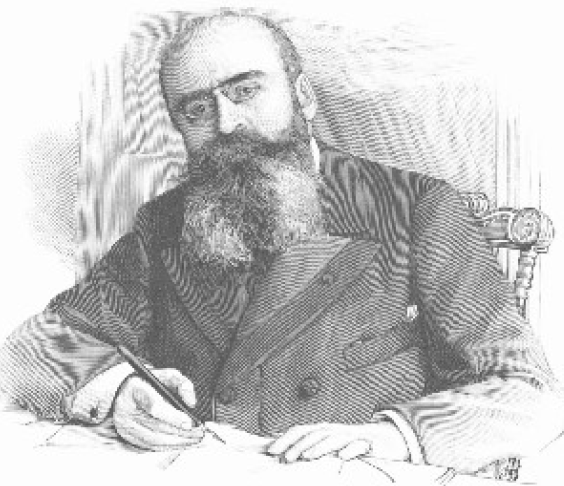
Louis Ganderax.

In 1899, Boylesve submitted the second version of his novel, Les Bonnets de dentelle, to Louis Ganderax, the director of La Revue de Paris. The novel was based on the author's early childhood memories. The original manuscript of the first version is believed to be lost. The text was rejected by the publisher, who expressed interest but criticized Boylesve's style as too loose and the plot as too short. The novel concluded with the medical verdict for Aunt Félicie and was written in an impersonal style.

Following the completion of Mademoiselle Cloque, Boylesve revised his manuscript, condensing it by a third while extending the narrative to encompass a three-year period up until Félicie's demise. This revised version was subsequently published under the title La Becquée. In the revised version, the young Henri assumes the role of the narrator, while Aunt Félicie remains the central character. The majority of character names, including that of the narrator, underwent alteration. The style is more direct, with shorter sentences. Another minor but notable change for readers was the correction and neutralization of the heavy dialectal speech of some characters in Les Bonnets de dentelle, which made the text more accessible to a broader audience. The text was then accepted by Ganderax, (Note: Lefort 1949, p. 111) to whom Boylesve dedicated the novel.

La Becquée represents the advent of an "autobiographical" phase in Boylesve's oeuvre, wherein he situates himself within the narrative, in contrast to Mademoiselle Cloque, which is set in the milieu where Boylesve resided during his adolescence. While Mademoiselle Cloque also inaugurates a "new style" that the author maintained, and which appears to bridge the gap between Gustave Flaubert and Marcel Proust, it is possible to observe, through Les Bonnets de dentelle and La Becquée, the evolution of Boylesve's writing on the same subject. Pierre Joulia even posits that Ganderax's demands prompted Boylesve to gravitate towards a more classical style, one that was more aligned with his innate writing proclivities.

Similarly, characters such as the Marquis d'Aubrebie in Mademoiselle Cloque or the Baron de Chemillé in La Leçon d'amour dans un parc can be regarded as representatives of the author. In a similar manner, Mr. Laballue, Félicie's friend, on occasion, articulates René Boylesve's perspectives in La Becquée. Consequently, the author personifies two distinct figures: the child who narrates, and describes, yet refrains from judgment, and the mature man whose opinions are anticipated and respected by other characters, despite their reservations. (Note: Bourgeois 1945, p. 150)

== A seemingly regionalist novel ==
In addition to Mademoiselle Cloque, L'Enfant à la balustrade, La Leçon d'amour dans un parc, and Le Médecin des dames de Néans, La Becquée represents a further contribution to the corpus of novels dedicated by René Boylesve to the region he affectionately refers to as "his little homeland." This designation, as elucidated by François Trémouilloux, encompasses the French province of Touraine. (Note: Trémouilloux 2010, p. 145) However, La Becquée is not a regional novel; rather, Boylesve's childhood memories serve merely as a backdrop through which he develops his study of social manners. In this work, the setting is of minimal importance, despite its symbolic significance to the author, who constructs the narrative around characters, locations, and events with which he is familiar. The story could conceivably unfold on any expansive estate and address analogous concerns. Boylesve echoes Émile Zola's notion that "material truth should serve as a springboard to elevate us higher."

=== Partial autobiography ===
==== The family clan ====
René Boylesve's life paralleled that of the character Riquet, whom he is said to have modeled on himself. He lost his mother at an early age and was subsequently raised by his great-aunt, Clémence Janneau, who is thought to have inspired the character of Félicie Planté. Similarly, she perished (in 1876), and her spouse committed suicide slightly over five months later. The resemblance between character and model was so pronounced that following the publication of La Becquée, Clémence Janneau was referred to in the family only as "Aunt Félicie." Many Boylesve's relatives, including uncles, aunts, and grandparents, are featured in La Becquée. However, Boylesve had a sister, Marie, who was a co-heir with him of the Barbotinière estate following Clémence Janneau's death. Despite this, Marie does not appear in the novel. (Note: Lefort 1949, pp. 135 & 139)

In the novel, the character names frequently allows reflecting Boyle's deliberate decision to express specific aspects of their personality or role. For example, the great-aunt Félicie is named "Planté", which may allude to her strong attachment to the land. This is further evidenced by her being called "Plateau" in Les Bonnets de dentelle. In contrast, the grandfather Casimir's family name, "Fantin", is an apt reflection of this individual, who is advanced in age yet maintains a youthful demeanor. The name of the coachman-gardener, "Fridolin", was likely selected for its amusing sound, as it did not yet carry a derogatory association with Germans. (Note: Fridolin is a character created by Victorien Sardou in his opéra bouffe-féerie Le Roi Carotte, with music by Jacques Offenbach, premiered in Paris in 1872.)

==== The Courance Estate (La Barbotinière) ====
Location map. La Chaume: real place name (La Chaume): novel toponym

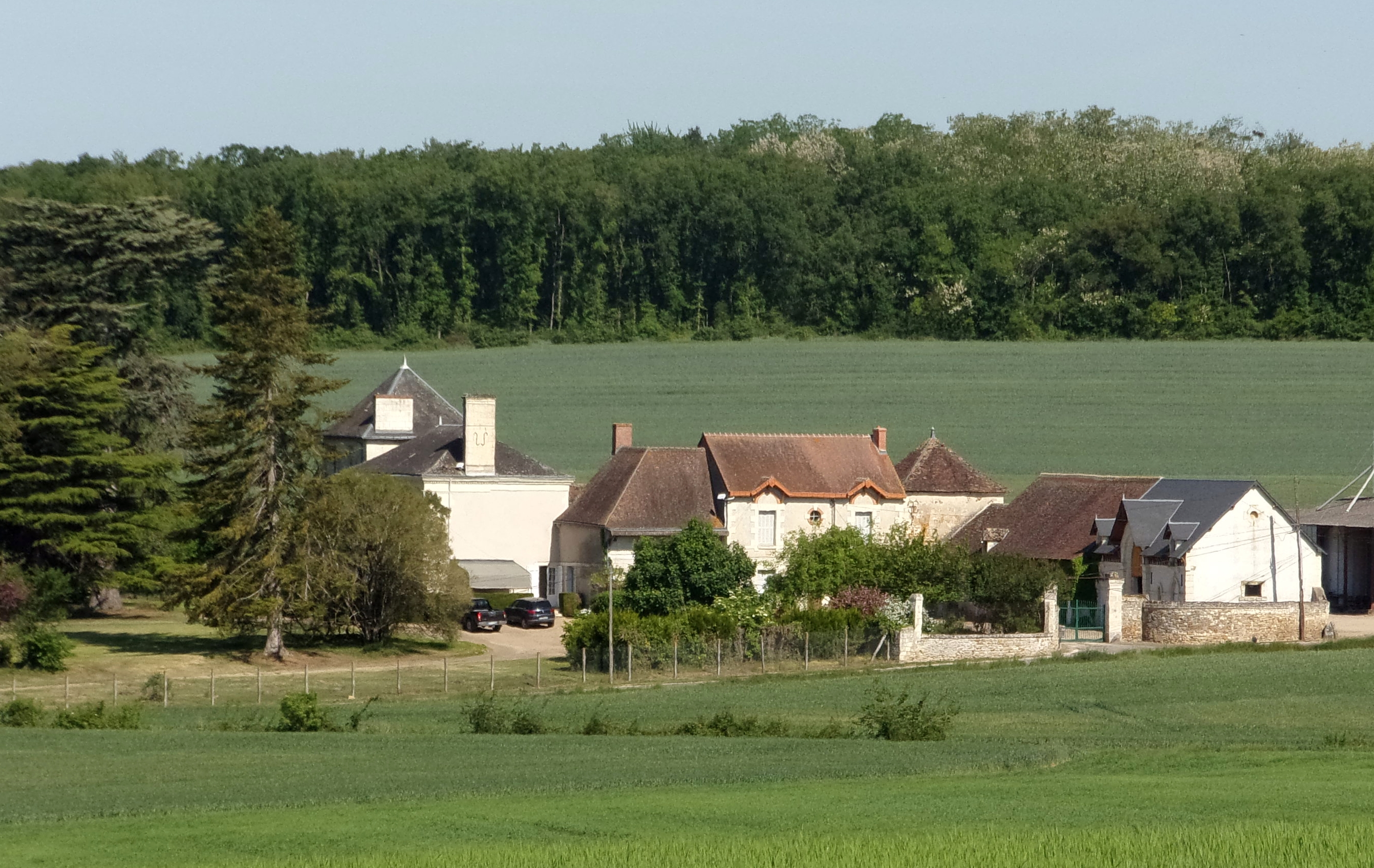
La Barbotinière (Courance).

The locales described by Boylesve, frequently presented under fictitious nomenclature, are predominantly authentic and align with the geographical areas where he spent his formative years. The municipality of La Haye Descartes, the place of his birth, is renamed Beaumont. The former commune of Balesmes, which was annexed to the previous one in 1966, is referred to as La Ville-aux-Dames. This is a real town in Touraine, but it is situated almost 50 kilometers away. (Note: Lefort 1949, p. 136) The Courance estate, which is known as "La Barbotinière" and is owned by Clémence Janneau, is named after the small stream that nearly runs dry through it. This toponym may also evoke, by the novel's spirit, the passage of time. In the vicinity of the aforementioned locations, such as "L'Épinay", "La Chaume", "Les Sapins", and "Le Moulin de Gruteau" situated along the Esves River, the actual names are retained. The dolmen where Félicie sits to contemplate her estate, known as "Chillou du Feuillet", also exists and is referenced in the novel.

The distances between these points are, in fact, shorter in reality than in the novel. However, this is a deliberate effect created by Boylesve, who adopts the perspective of a child who perceives things in a grand scale.

=== A theme close to Boylesve’s heart ===
==== The nurturing land and family ====
The central theme of La Becquée is an examination of the ambiguous and contradictory relationships Aunt Félicie has with her property and her family. The latter is composed of relatives as old as she is, who could not or did not manage to secure financial independence and who depend on her "to feed them." (Note: Trémouilloux 2010, p. 167)

She evinces a profound and genuine affinity for the land that sustains her and her relatives. She oversees the operations of her properties with meticulous attention to detail, remaining apprised of the minutiae of daily life on one of her six tenant farms, which she visits daily. The novel's tone is established from its outset, when Félicie observes that, amidst the turbulence of the 1870 war, the land remains the most secure investment, noting that "they [the Prussians] won't be able to take it with them." However, she never pursues wealth, residing modestly with her family. Courance serves as a source of income, providing sufficient sustenance, but not exceeding this basic level. (Note: Lefort 1949, p. 135)

Additionally, she exhibits a profound affection for her family, albeit less overtly. She responds to the creditors of her brother-in-law Casimir, whom she takes in, without jeopardizing Courance's financial stability. Furthermore, she discreetly places banknotes in envelopes for her nephew Philibert. Her robust, almost Balzacian character is evident in the contrasts and even confrontations with the personalities of these three protagonists.

These two concerns of Félicie evoke the historical context of the 19th century, in which the estate frequently served as the site for the formation and evolution of a bourgeois family. (Note: Bourgeois 1945, pp. 160–161)

==== The end of a world ====
In the novel's conclusion, Boylesve posits that with the demise of Aunt Félicie, a definitive turning point has been reached (Note: Lefort 1949, p. 134) and that despite her precautions, Courance's future will diverge from the past. It is conceivable that the author originally intended to title his earliest version of the text The End of a World.

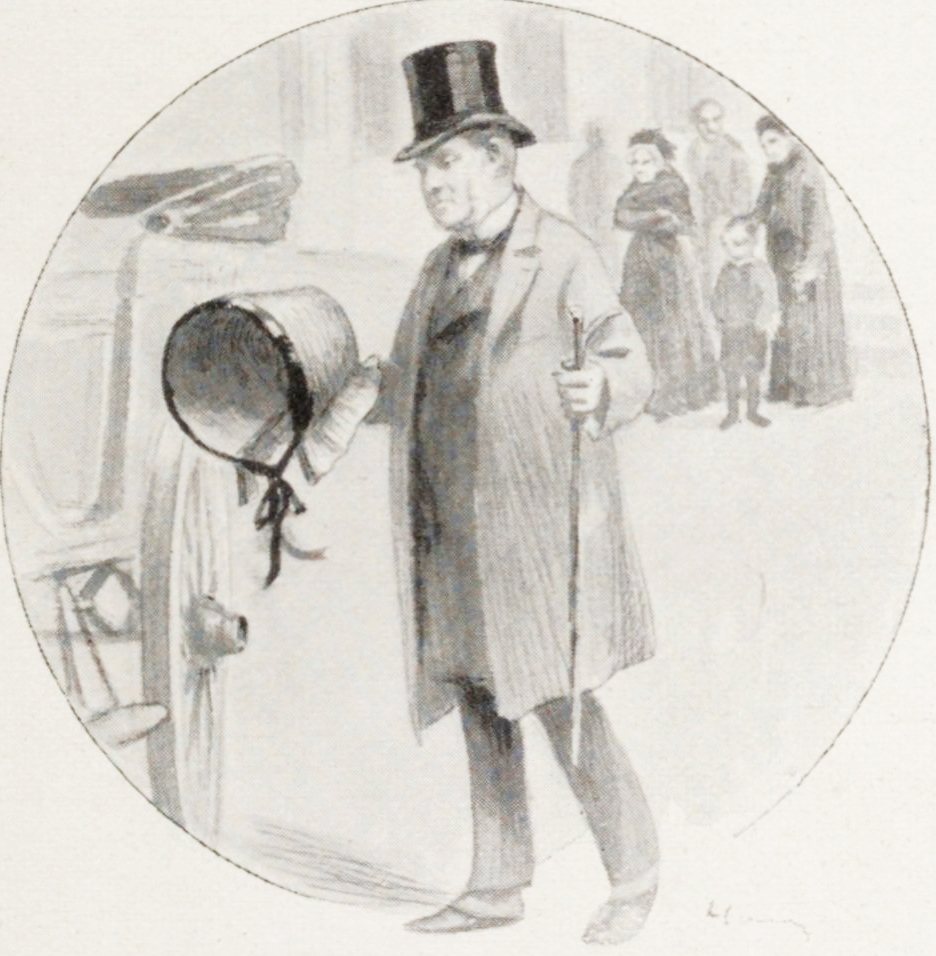
M. Laballue carrying Félicie's hat and cane.

The era of Félicie, as well as that of Courance, reaches its conclusion with the funeral procession traversing the same route she had traversed daily, bearing a straw hat and cane, from farm to farm. (Note: Lefort 1949, p. 128) The novel's concluding passages depict the symbolic "second death" of Félicie. Her straw hat and cane are taken from Courance by Mr. Laballue, her devoted and impartial acquaintance to whom she bequeathed them. (Note: Lefort 1949, p. 129) This final scene reflects what transpired following Clémence Janneau's demise.

Earlier on in the narrative, other cracks foreshadow the eventual outcome. Riquet's father marries "the Creole", disregarding social norms. Félicie, her autonomy compromised by illness and discomfort, resumes her daily card games with Casimir following a prolonged estrangement and ultimately accepts her nephew Philibert's wife at Courance. She will serve as Philibert's wife's primary caretaker until her demise, perhaps precisely because she does not belong to the "family clan." (Note: Lefort 1949, p. 126)

Additionally, Boylesve subtly references the decline of another social order, that of the landed bourgeoisie, from which some of his family originated. (Note: Bourgeois 1945, p. 161) André Bourgeois interprets the scene in which farmer Pidoux defies Félicie as indicative of a "slow but powerful advance of the people", reflecting a profound social transformation reminiscent of the Paris Commune.

==== A child’s education ====
The topic of education is frequently addressed by Boyle in his works, from his inaugural novel, Le Médecin des dames de Néans, onwards. Indeed, he has even made it the title of certain novels, including La Leçon d'amour dans un parc, Les Nouvelles Leçons d'amour dans un parc, and La Jeune Fille bien élevée.

The focus here is not on the traditional academic education, although the great-aunt does teach Riquet to read from a decorative screen in the dining room and expresses concern during a trip she takes about whether the youngster is fulfilling the assignments given to him by Mr. Laballue each Wednesday. Rather, the emphasis is on imparting lessons firmly rooted in concrete examples. During each of their walks, and even later, when she is no longer able to leave her chair, Félicie makes it her responsibility to guide young Riquet in understanding his relationship with the land, which she wants to be nurturing. She hopes that he will take over managing the estate after her death. Additionally, she teaches him about the complexity of relationships between adults. The young boy can comprehend this intricacy, though not fully grasp its nuances, as the adults are not always circumspect in their interactions with him due to his tender age. (Note: Trémouilloux 2010, pp. 170–171) (Note: Lefort 1949, p. 137)

==== Respect for decorum ====
The satirization of decorum within the late 19th-century petite bourgeoisie is a recurring theme.

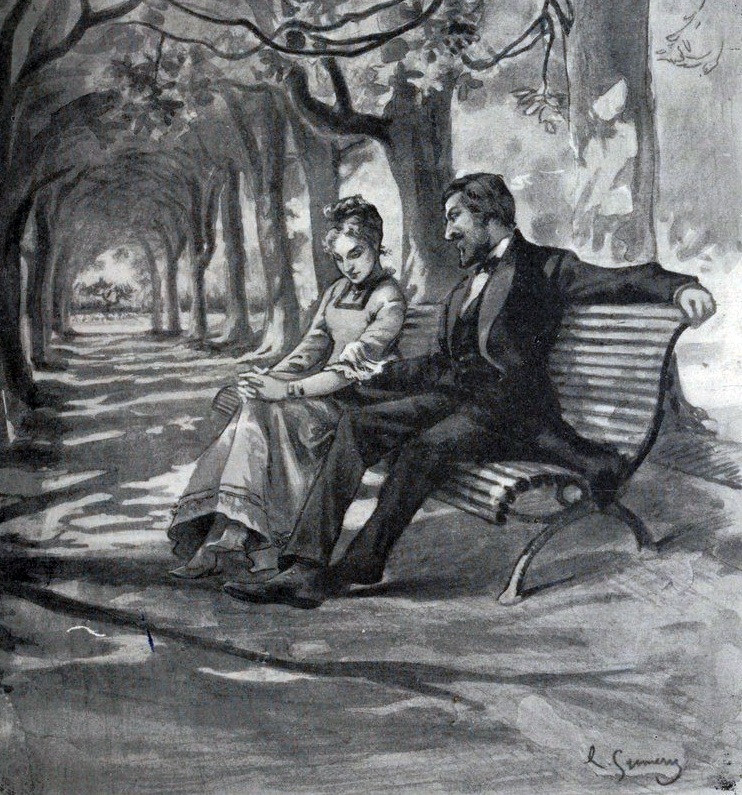
Philibert and Mrs. Letermillé.

It is deemed unacceptable to procreate outside of matrimony (as exemplified by Adrienne, daughter of Philibert and Marceline). Furthermore, marriage institution is perceived as exclusive to couples of similar social class, religious affiliation, and, when feasible, geographical origin (in contrast to Mr. Nadaud and "the Creole"). In all situations, it is imperative to adhere to the established norms and practices. Even Philibert's stated intention to marry Marceline and thereby confer an "official status" upon Adrienne is met with disapproval from the family. Furthermore, Philibert's sense of duty does not align with that of his relatives. Félicie's nephew requires a suitable spouse, and his family, though unsuccessfully, attempts to arrange a marriage between him and Mme. Letermillé, a young widow. Subsequently, they endeavor to pair Mr. Nadaud with Mme. Letermillé for analogous reasons, yet again without success.

Furthermore, excessive beauty is regarded as a liability for women. Mme. Letermillé laments to Philibert that since she was widowed, she must adhere to an even higher standard of conduct than if she were unattractive. This is because she is presumed to be more "sought after." In L'Enfant à la balustrade, Boylesve revisits this theme concerning the Creole, noting that she was considered too attractive to be what is referred to in the provinces as a "proper woman."

Pain or emotional distress is often perceived as a sign of vulnerability or weakness. The novel's final section depicts Félicie's futile attempts to conceal her distress and the indications of her physical deterioration from those in her immediate vicinity. This is an illustrative example of stoicism but also reveals a form of pride. Throughout, Félicie's sole focus is on Courance. (Note: Trémouilloux 2010, p. 168) She prioritizes the work over the individual, as she informs Riquet, "Your father, your grandmother, your uncles, your aunts, they're all well, but observe this land: it's what will sustain them all." (Note: Lefort 1949, p. 127) Undoubtedly, this conviction propels her to persevere until the end and enables her to postpone, to some extent, the inevitable conclusion.

== Reception ==
While L'Enfant à la balustrade had twenty-one print runs of its original edition, La Becquée ceased production after the tenth. Henry Bidou attributes this discrepancy to a discrepancy between the intimate, confidential nature of Boylesve's work and the more extroverted tastes of younger readers. The book was reprinted by Calmann-Lévy during the 1910s–1920s, but no new editions were published until the late 1980s.

The work was lauded by critics and contemporaneous writers, including Boylesve. In its May 15, 1901, issue, La Revue naturiste asserted that La Becquée was one of the most outstanding works published that year. In his critique, Pierre Lasserre lauded La Becquée as a "masterpiece, a great book that provides readers with a sacred emotion." In his correspondence, Marcel Proust, whose literary style is often compared to René Boylesve's, described La Becquée as "admirable." For Jacques des Gachons, it is a "true and just" book, and one of "those that must be read", according to Albert Déchelette. In a tribute to René Boylesve shortly after his death in Les Nouvelles littéraires, artistiques et scientifiques, Edmond Jaloux called it "a book so strong and so grand."

In 1913, a project to adapt the novel for the theater was proposed in Le Monde artiste, but it ultimately did not materialize.

== Editions ==
- La Becquée, serialized in La Grande Revue from October 1900.
- Boylesve (1901). La Becquée (Original edition). Paris: La Revue Blanche. Archived from the original on June 1, 2022.
- Boylesve (1910). La Becquée (diverse reeditions). Illustrated by Adolphe Gumery. Paris: Calmann-Lévy. Archived from the original on April 25, 2022.
- Boylesve (1988). La Becquée. Fins de siècles. Paris: 10/18. ISBN 978-2-264-01113-8.
- Boylesve (2012). La Becquée. Trédition classics. Trédition. ISBN 978-3-8491-3003-9.
- Boylesve (2013). La Becquée. Terroir classique. Paris: Marivole. ISBN 978-2-36575-029-5.
- Boylesve (2021). La Becquée. SAGA Egmont. ISBN 978-87-26-65768-5.

== See also ==
- 20th-century French literature

== Bibliography ==
- Barret, Hélène (2017). "Toponymes et anthroponymes dans les romans de René Boylesve" [Toponyms and anthroponyms in the novels of René Boylesve]. Les Heures Boylesviennes (in French) (XLV): 27–37.
- Bourgeois, André (1945). René Boylesve, l'homme, le peintre de la Touraine [René Boylesve, the man and painter of Touraine] (in French). Paris: Droz.
- Bourgeois, André. La vie de René Boylesve [The life of René Boylesve] (in French). Vol. 1: Les enfances (1867-1896). Geneva, Paris: Droz. ISBN 978-2-600-03450-0. Archived from the original on January 2, 2022.
- Joulia, Pierre (1969). René Boylesve, sa vie, son œuvre : conférence au château royal de Loches, 12 juin 1969 [René Boylesve, his life, his work: lecture at the Château Royal de Loches, June 12, 1969] (in French). Le Réveil lochois.
- Lefort, Edmond (1949). La Touraine de René Boylesve [René Boylesve's Touraine] (in French). Tours: Arrault. pp. Preface by Jean-Louis Vaudoyer, illustrated by Marie-Thérèse Mabille.
- Trémouilloux, François (2010). René Boylesve, un romancier du sensible (1867-1926) [René Boylesve, a sensitive novelist (1867-1926)] (in French). Presses universitaires François-Rabelais. ISBN 978-2-86906-336-5. Archived from the original on January 1, 2022.
