= L'Enfant à la balustrade =

Novel by René Boylesve

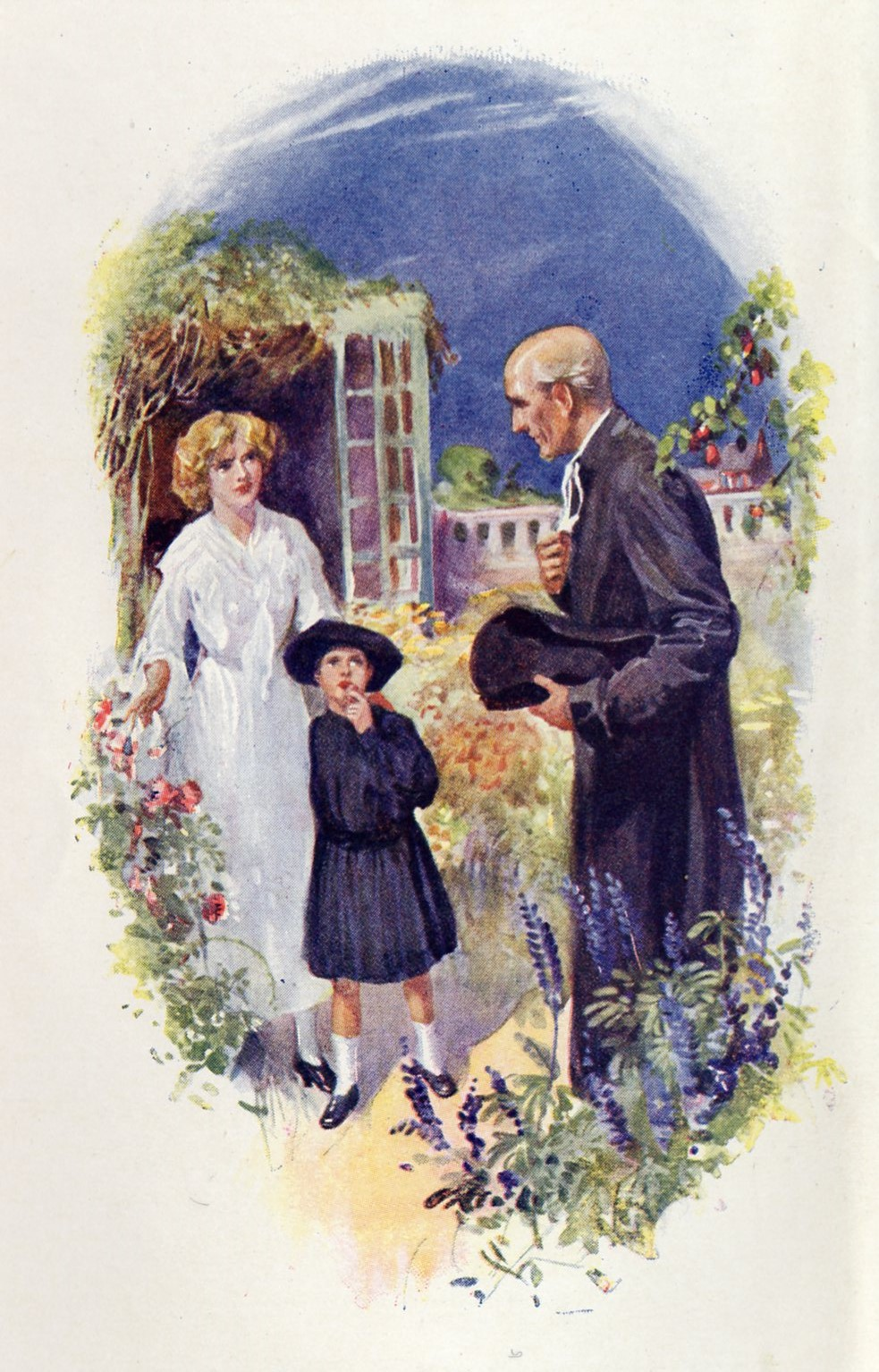
- Frontispiece from the 1913 edition.
- Author: René Boylesve
- Cover artist: Claude Chopy
- Genre: Novel of manners
- Publisher: Calmann-Lévy
- Publication date: 1903
- Publication place: Paris; France
- Pages: 386

L'Enfant à la balustrade (French pronunciation: [lɑ̃fɑ̃ a la balystʁad]) is a novel of manners by René Boylesve that draws heavily on the author's own experiences and is set in a regional context. The story was first published in 1903 in La Renaissance latine as a serialized work comprising four parts, titled Comédie sous la balustrade (Comedy at the Balustrade). It was subsequently released as a book by Calmann-Lévy.

This novel is a sequel to La Becquée, published two years earlier and featuring the same principal characters, most notably the narrator, Riquet Nadaud.

== Description ==
L'Enfant à la balustrade is narrated from the perspective of a ten-year-old boy whose father is a notary. The novel examines the lives of the petty bourgeoisie, who are grouped in "circles" with their alliances, quarrels, and reconciliations of convenience, in a small town in southern Touraine. A residence with a terraced garden enclosed by a balustrade overlooking the town plays a pivotal role in the narrative. The notary is temporarily excluded from bourgeois society due to his purchase of the property in question, which was made in clear violation of the local notable's knowledge. The notary's return to social grace only occurs after the narrative, when he and his family finally take up residence in the house. The envy of those around them is supplanted by admiration, whether genuine or forced.

Meanwhile, the child matures without losing his emotional responsiveness; his personality becomes more defined, and his capacity for critical thinking develops. He experiences his first romantic feelings and begins a quest for an ideal that he finds difficult to define. He is fascinated by a statue of Alfred de Vigny in the town center, situated amidst the tumultuous lives of the adults.

Upon the novel's publication, most critics commended the precise portrayal of provincial life as well as the satirical elements within. Additionally, they perceived Riquet's quest for an ideal to be analogous to that of the author himself, both in his childhood and adulthood. L'Enfant à la balustrade was among the nominees for the inaugural Prix Goncourt, awarded in 1903, but did not secure the award. The novel was translated into English and Spanish during the author's lifetime. After Boylesve's passing, the novel was recognized as one of his most accomplished works and reissued on multiple occasions, yet it did not achieve a substantial print run.

== Summary ==
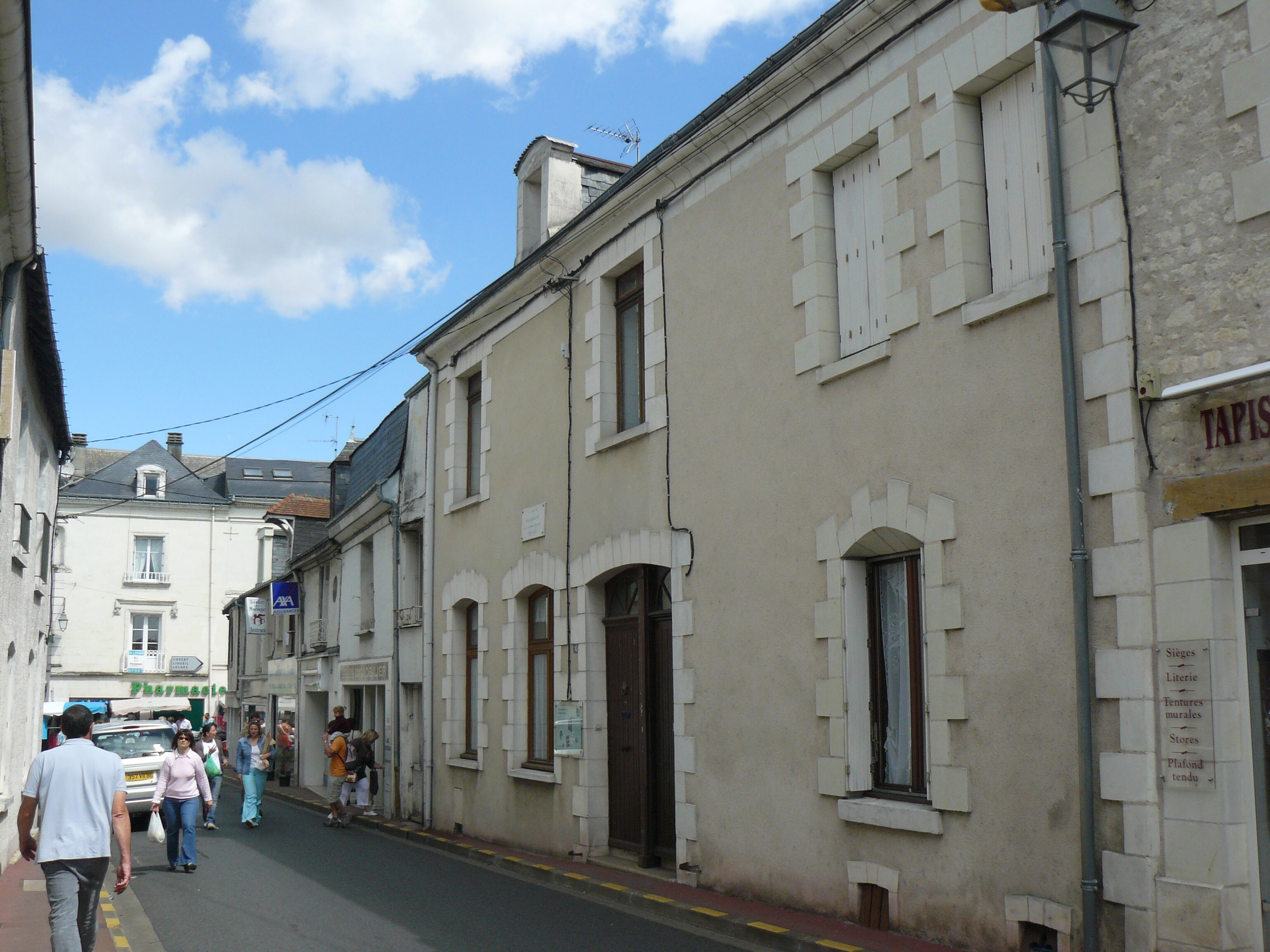
René Boylesve's birthplace in Descartes (Riquet Nadaud's house at the start of the novel).

Henri Nadaud, affectionately referred to as "Riquet" by his family, is approximately ten years of age at the outset of the novel. He is the son of a notary and resides in Beaumont, a modest municipality in the southern region of Touraine. Riquet observes the intricate dynamics of the local notables' world, shaped by complex relationships. These include familial bonds, such as that between his father and stepmother, whom he affectionately calls "little mom", and his grandmother, who has yet to fully accept her son's remarriage, particularly to a Creole woman. Riquet also witnesses the interplay of friendships, rivalries, alliances, betrayals, and reconciliations of convenience among the notables. This complex situation stems from the purchase of a house by Master Nadaud, which is currently occupied by Madame Colivaut, who retains its use until her death. (Note: Trémouilloux 2010, p. 176) This house, one of the town's most aesthetically pleasing, was also the object of desire for Mr. and Mrs. Plancoulaine, affluent bourgeois residents of Beaumont surrounded by a network of "friends" with ulterior motives. The Nadaud family is subjected to a social "rejection" by the Plancoulaines as a form of retribution, resulting in the loss of their clientele by the notary. To alleviate the isolation and boredom, Mrs. Nadaud is even momentarily tempted to engage in infidelity with her husband.

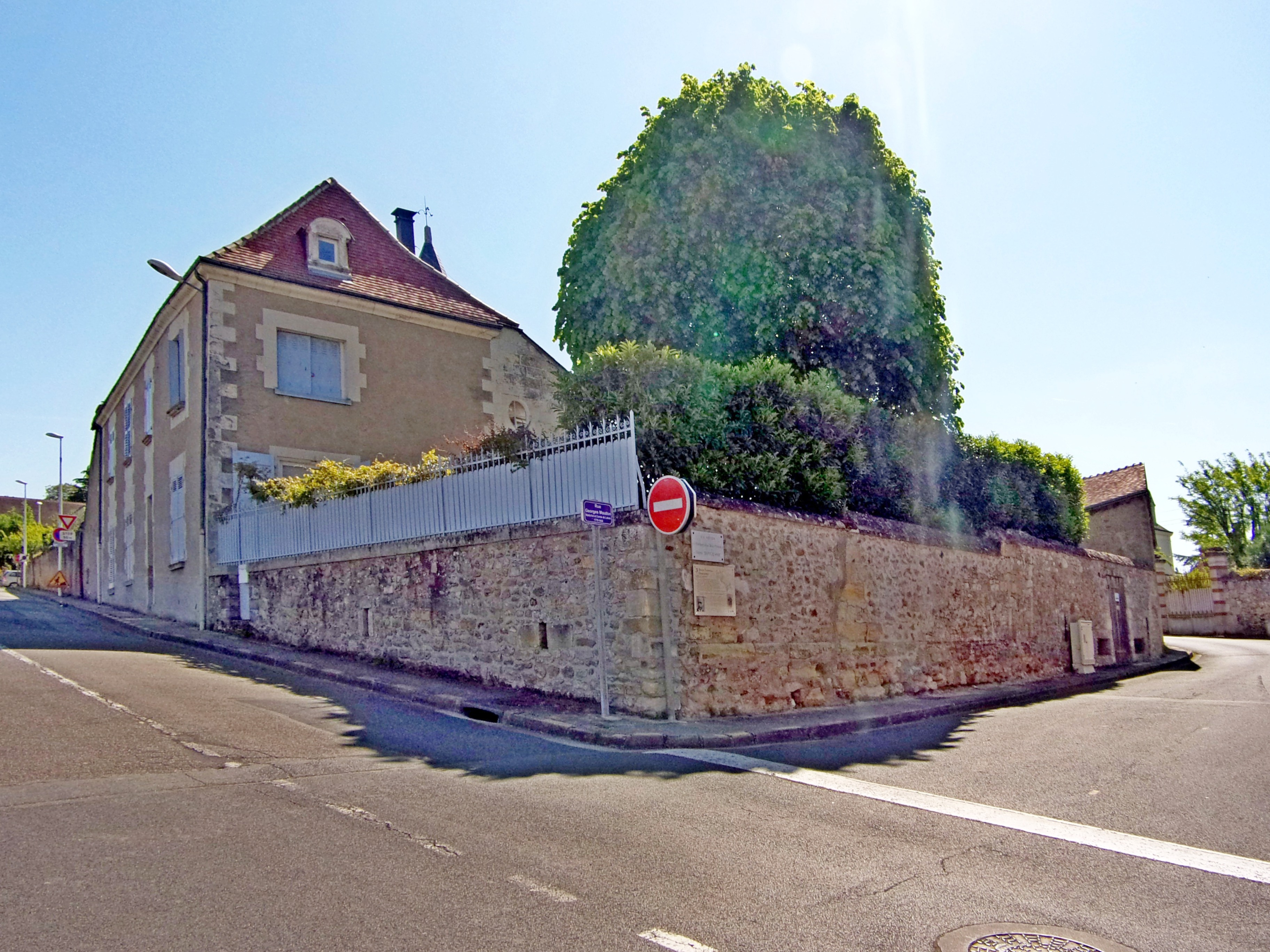
Maison Mouton (Maison Colivaut) in Descartes.

The isolation ended with the death of Madame Colivaut, coinciding with the Nadauds taking up residence in the house that had long been desired by them. Subsequently, those who had previously distanced themselves from the Nadauds begin to return, including Clérambourg, a friend of thirty years who had also withdrawn, and most notably, the Plancoulaines themselves, who take the initial steps towards reconciliation, eager to be invited by the Nadauds in turn. Jealousy gives way to admiration, which is occasionally tinged with envy. Nevertheless, Master Nadaud has yet to make a personal gesture to fully reconcile with the Plancoulaines. This will entail sending them a basket of game he has hunted himself.

In the context of these adult concerns, the repercussions of which he is acutely aware and which his age allows him to comprehend and analyze more effectively, Riquet's sole source of genuine pleasure is strolling in the garden of the house his father purchased, in pursuit of an ideal that he finds challenging to define. The garden, arranged over three terraces, includes a sundial that captures his attention. The sundial, which is set on a slate plaque, bears the inscription "Laedunt omnes, ultima necat" ("all [hours] wound; the last one kills"). This inscription is sometimes attributed to Seneca and is often inscribed on sundials. He encounters Marguerite Charmaison, a girl slightly older than him, in front of this sundial. He immediately develops a profound admiration and affection for her, although she is unaware of his feelings. The terrace is surrounded by a balustrade that serves as a kind of observation point, from which the boy can view the main street and the vista of the town extending southward to the square where a statue of Alfred de Vigny is situated.

In the concluding sections of the novel, Riquet reaches a state of complete disillusionment. Despite the apparent reconciliation between the Nadauds and the Plancoulaines, he is aware of its inherent artificiality. Marguerite Charmaison makes an unexpected announcement regarding her forthcoming marriage. From his vantage point on the balustrade, the boy addresses the statue of the poet one final time, seeking assistance.

=== Themes: Between satire and ideal ===
In the preface to his work, René Boylesve clearly states the purpose he pursued in writing it:

I dare to hope that [the readers] will enjoy recognizing, in the present volume, the silent, painful, and frequent conflict between the idealism of childhood and the necessary relativities or the farce of our social life.

==== Satire of the provincial bourgeoisie ====
The characters whose traits Boyleves examines and the society he analyzes are predominantly members of the "middle classes." In this social stratum, instincts or profound aspirations frequently collide with the constraints of social conventions, frequently in opposition to the prejudices or traditions of their families. This choice offers the author a greater quantity of material. In small provincial French towns, 19th-century social organization appears to be modeled on the "aristocratic salon." This depiction of "ordinary people" in the provinces—a small world of urban notables led by the petty king Plancoulaine—is painted through the eyes of the child, intensifying its naive ferocity, though softened by tenderness or, on occasion, touches of humor:

… Madame Plancoulaine had, on her chin, the stubble of a moldy meat pie.

The entire world depicted in this text is characterized by pettiness and servility, including the character of Maître Nadaud, who is depicted as mediocre and weak, like many other male characters in Boyle's work. The episode involving the "raisiné", a popular grape compote served at Plancoulaine's receptions, illustrates the hosts’ mediocrity, a quality one might have expected to find in more refined offerings. Towards the conclusion of the novel, Mme Plancoulaine presents Riquet and his father with game pâté instead of raisiné, a gesture of goodwill that is particularly noteworthy given that it was Maître Nadaud who had gifted the game to the Plancoulaine as a diplomatic gesture. This act serves to illustrate a softening of relations.

These events indicate the advent of a decline in the small-town bourgeoisie, a phenomenon that Boylesve depicts in this novel like his portrayal in La Becquée. According to Edmond Jaloux, the novel offers a valuable account of provincial life after the 19th century, providing insights that are relevant to historians engaged in the study of the Belle Époque.

==== Quest for the ideal ====
Boylesve chooses a quote from Sainte-Beuve as an epigraph for his text:

In three-quarters of men, there is a poet who dies young, while the man survives.

As his awareness gradually develops, Riquet begins to experience a growing desire and attraction towards an ideal, which may have been inspired by the statue of Alfred de Vigny on the square in Beaumont. The statue in question is that of René Descartes. The pursuit of this ideal, temporarily disrupted by the influence of adult concerns and disillusionment, reemerges in the final lines of the novel, where, from the balustrade garden, the child addresses the statue, placing all his hopes in the poet above: "What do you see? What do you see? You who seem above us all!"

Additionally, Riquet's ideal may be the love he discovers for Marguerite Charmaison. Despite his feelings for her, he remains unattainable and never reveals his emotions. Consequently, she gradually fades from his life as the novel draws to a close. (Note: Trémouilloux 2010, p. 178)

In his book, Boylesve presents his life as a "sad example of a mediocre and malicious life." He also discusses the "need for something better, more beautiful", which he believes is present in childhood. This inclination, which René Boylesve likely experienced as a child, may have persisted in him as an adult and writer. The child's disenchantment reflects the author's, imparting a sad gravity to the novel. L'Enfant à la balustrade reflects the author and Riquet's challenging search for a balance between sensitivity and reason.

==== The setting: Touraine and gardens ====
The novel illustrates Boylesve's affinity for his native province, its "petit pays", (Note: Trémouilloux 2010, p. 145) and its landscapes. However, as with La Becquée, this portrayal of provincial life could be elsewhere. The regional setting serves merely as a pretext. The Plancoulaine, for instance, are stereotypes, omnipresent characters. Beaumont and its residents bear resemblance to those of the Val de Loire more broadly. Boylesve's attachment to Touraine does not stem from a connection to the land itself, but rather because it is where he first experienced sensations of an external world.

The family garden occupies a central position in Boylesve's work, providing the child with an opportunity to engage in extended daydreams. In other gardens depicted in Boylesve's oeuvre, such as those in La Leçon d'amour and Souvenirs du jardin détruit, the gardens themselves assume a quasi-characteristic role. In his acceptance speech at the Académie Française, Abel Hermant, Boylesve's successor, underscores Boylesve's affinity for gardens.

The balustrade, frequently observed in opulent gardens and public parks, serves as a pervasive ornamental motif in Boyle's novels, functioning as "a quasi-psychic portal into the author's inner world."

=== Main characters ===
The following individuals are absent from La Becquée: Plancoulaine, Marguerite Charmaison, and Dr. Troufleau.

==== Nadaud family ====
Maître Nadaud is a notary public in the city of Beaumont. In the aftermath of his ostracism, he cannot discern that those who had previously excluded him from the social fabric of the town now seek his return, one by one. He persists in his stance, disregarding their messages of conciliation and inclusivity. In doing so, he illustrates his lack of knowledge regarding the principles and codes that govern the bourgeoisie of Beaumont. He is a weak-willed individual who rebels only in thought, as when he hopes the smoke from his cigar will bother one of his enemies. However, the smoke, unfortunately, rises above his enemy's head and creates a kind of aura around him. At the beginning of the novel, he displays a certain arrogance by announcing that he has purchased the Colivaut house and dismissing the potential issues that could arise from this transaction. However, he becomes more humble when he moves in. He is the pivotal figure in the plot, as his real estate purchase serves as Boyle's main narrative device. Nevertheless, it is challenging to categorize him as the "main character." (Note: Trémouilloux 2010, pp. 178–179)

Henri Nadaud, referred to as "Riquet" and the narrator of the novel, is approximately ten years of age at the beginning of the narrative. As in La Becquée, he observes and describes the situations and behaviors of the adults around him, but he has matured. At this point in the narrative, the young narrator can analyze the behavior of the adults around him, and the pettiness he discovers shatters some of his childhood illusions, making him doubt, if only for a moment, that there is an ideal to life. On 15 November 1903, in La Revue illustrée, Georges Casella expressed amazement at the "learned irony" with which this young child can judge others.

"Petite-maman" is the affectionate term used by Maître Nadaud's second wife. Riquet refers to her in this way as he is caught between his father and his grandmother, who has never accepted her son-in-law's remarriage and views her grandson as having only one "real" mother. Despite her lighthearted and carefree nature, she offers her husband unwavering support throughout the challenges he faces, which also affect her. However, she is momentarily tempted to betray him.

Grandmother Célina, Me Nadaud's mother-in-law, not only harbors strong reservations toward her son-in-law's second wife but also has no illusions about his weak character, of which she is acutely aware. She possesses a greater degree of insight than he does into the potential evolution of the situation and offers him counsel on how to handle it.

==== The surrounding cast ====
Mr. and Mrs. Plancoulaine, a bourgeois couple residing in a suburb south of Beaumont, exert considerable influence over the local bourgeoisie. Mr. Plancoulaine, in particular, held the position of mayor under the Second Empire. Those who challenge the Plancoulains or prove otherwise unpopular with them are swiftly labeled as enemies by the surrounding sycophants.

Maître Clérambourg, an honorary notary, has been a longtime friend of Maître Nadaud, who succeeded him by taking over his client base. However, Clérambourg is part of Plancoulaine's servile entourage. While he is likable at heart, he is also sheepish or opportunistic, and his opinions change according to the whims of Beaumont's "petty kings."

Marguerite Charmaison is the daughter of an anti-clerical Parisian deputy who only resides in Beaumont during the holiday season. A friend of Riquet's, though unknowingly, she provides him with a sentimental education; she is indifferent to the desire and admiration she elicits in him. In the novel's conclusion, she marries a Beaumont physician, selected by the Plancoulaine family, a decision that causes considerable distress to the adolescent Riquet. On this occasion, she wholly renounces her youthful aspirations, forsaking her erstwhile interest in philosophy, which had once enthralled her as she translated Kant, and forgetting her delight in meeting John Henry Newman, despite her father's anti-clericalism. Riquet, too, is in a sense a part of this "former life." The anthroponym selected by Boylesve is an apt description of the character: Marguerite Charmaison "charms" Riquet, as she does her future husband and even an unfortunate rival of his.

Dr. Troufleau, Marguerite Charmaison's spurned admirer, is a minor character in the novel. However, François Trémouilloux posits that Boylesve may have projected himself into this character, transferring his unrequited love for Louise Renaut, the "real-life" Marguerite Charmaison, into the novel. (Note: Trémouilloux 2010, p. 177)

== The novel in its time and history ==
The names of the principal characters are identical to those in La Becquée, and the novel is set entirely in Descartes and Buxeuil, the locales where Boylesve spent his formative years. The narrative is a fictionalized account of Boylesve's childhood experiences.

=== The story and its characters ===
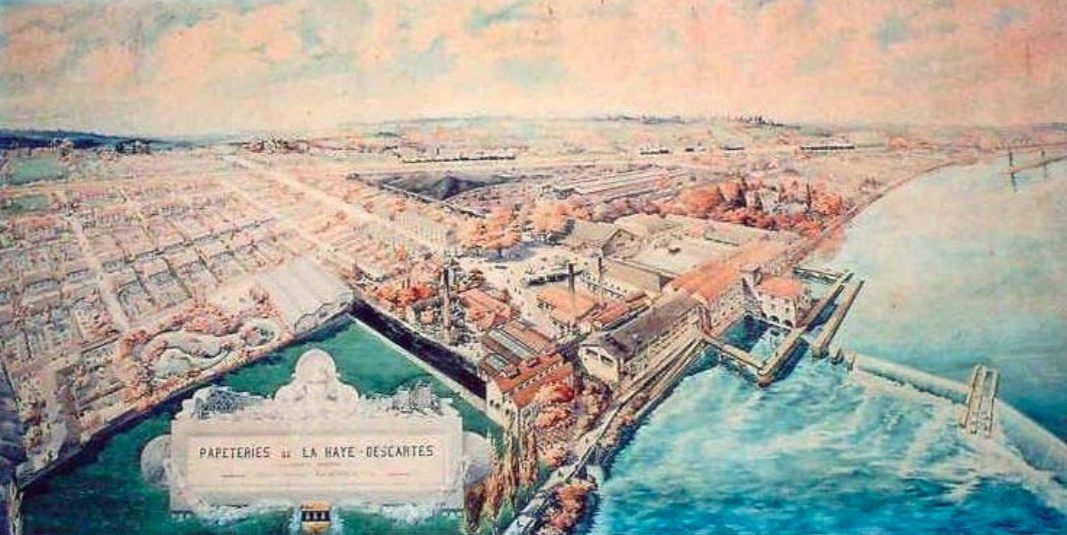
La Haye-Descartes paper mill in 1916.

In 1876, the narrative of La Becquée reaches its conclusion. At this point, François Tardiveau (Maître Nadaud in the novel), René Boylesve's father, is identified as a notary in La Haye-Descartes (Beaumont). He purchases the property situated at the intersection of Mouton and Pierre-Ballue streets (the Colivaut house in the novel) (Note: The Mouton house is a 16th-century edifice that underwent significant expansion and renovation in the 19th century.) from the heirs of Mme. Mouton, who has recently passed away. In doing so, he successfully circumvents Monsieur Defond (M. Plancoulaine), the proprietor of the local paper mill, who also expressed interest in acquiring the property. This purchase, viewed as a betrayal by M. Defond, results in Maître Tardiveau's ostracism from the town's high society. Clients abandon his office one by one, leading to his ruin. Even his friends, such as his predecessor Me Defrance (Clérambourg), turn away from him. M. Defond allegedly told his usual visitors, "At his place or mine: choose!"

Two years ago, René had encountered Louise Renaut (Marguerite Charmaison) at the Defond residence. Despite her seniority, he did not divulge his romantic feelings for her. In later years, he asserted that no other woman had played such a pivotal role in his life and that Louise served as the muse for several of his novels, with L'Enfant à la balustrade being the inaugural work. (Note: Bourgeois 1958, p. 107)

The novel's conclusion, in which Maître Nadaud reclaims favor with the Beaumont elite and restores his clientele, is markedly more optimistic than the reality of the situation. Me Tardiveau, financially devastated, is compelled to sell the Mouton residence, where he had established his legal practice, and departs La Haye-Descartes without resolving his differences with M. Defond. He arrives in Tours in early 1883, registers as a lawyer, but seldom secures clients, and ultimately takes his own life on 17 May of the same year. (Note: Bourgeois 1958, pp. 99–100)

=== The settings ===
Location map. maison Mouton: real toponym; (Colivaut house): toponymic correspondence in the novel

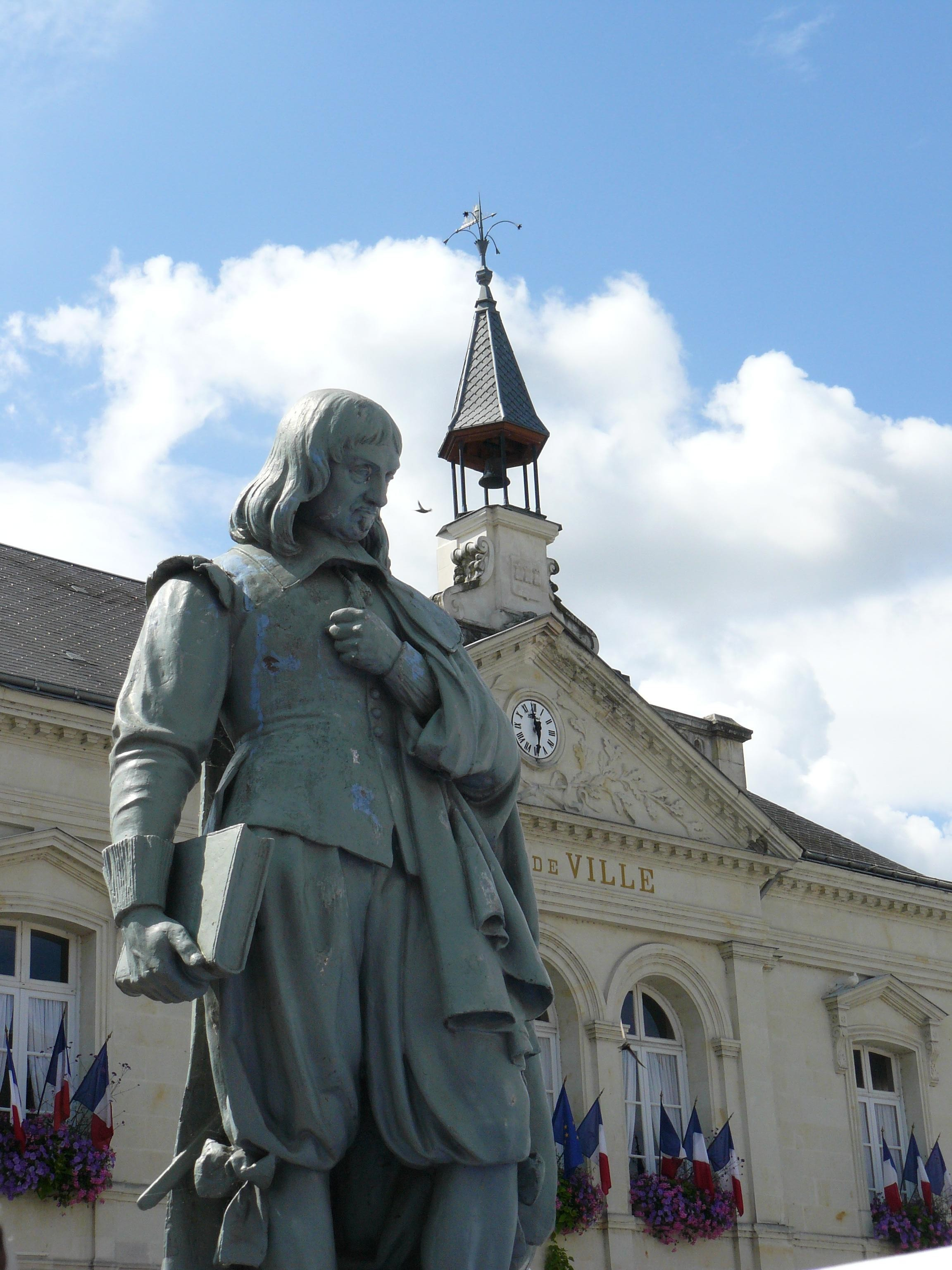
Statue of René Descartes in Descartes.

The garden of the Mouton house in Descartes had terraces and a sundial; however, there is no evidence that it was ever equipped with a balustrade. In his novel Boylesve, Boyle added the balustrade that bordered the presbytery's garden, where he took catechism classes. The latter garden, which overlooks the right bank of the Creuse near the bridge over the river, was adjacent to the site designated as the "René-Boylesve Garden" on 21 October 1951. (Note: Trémouilloux 2010, p. 100) However, it was separated from the designated garden by the former Church of Notre-Dame de La Haye.

On the left bank of the Creuse, aligned with the bridge and in the commune of Buxeuil, the Plancoulaine château belonged to Mr. Defond, who was unsuccessful in his attempt to purchase the Mouton house from Maître Tardiveau. In the novel, the location of the château remains unchanged, yet the author, Boylesve, names his character after the property.

It is a verifiable fact that a statue exists in Descartes, in front of the town hall and at the location indicated in Boylesve's novel. However, the statue does not represent Alfred de Vigny, as is commonly believed, but rather René Descartes. However, Vigny, Boylesve's preferred poet, more accurately represents the author's poetic idealism. During the 1870s, the Mouton house terrace extended further than it does currently, enabling young Boylesve to observe the statue and the town center. This experience is no longer possible.

== Genesis and style of the novel ==
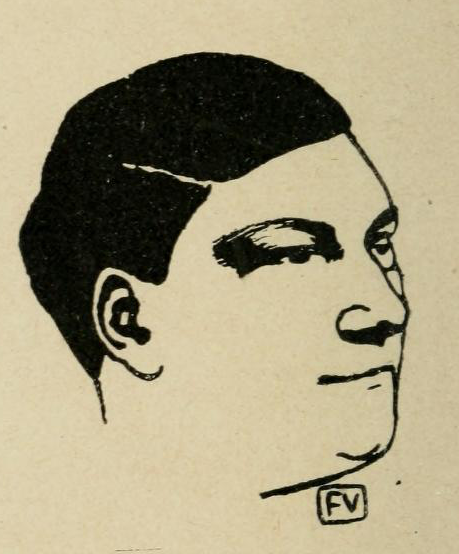
Hugues Rebell, by Félix Vallotton (circa 1898).

L'Enfant à la balustrade is a sequel to La Becquée (1901), with the opening passages of the latter novel establishing a narrative connection to the former. Probably, the concept for these two novels was first proposed to René Boylesve in 1893 or 1894 by his acquaintance Hugues Rebell, who encouraged him to document his childhood recollections in written form. (Note: Trémouilloux 2010, p. 195)

The novel is a product of the author's "autobiographical period", which commenced with La Becquée in 1901. This marked a stylistic shift duly noted by Edmond Lefort. Up until 1899, with the publication of Mademoiselle Cloque, Boylesve's style exhibited some similarities to that of Marcel Proust. However, his publisher Louis Ganderax criticized it for lacking conciseness. In response to the aforementioned criticism, Boylesve began to simplify his writing style, as evidenced in La Becquée and particularly in L'Enfant à la balustrade, where he employed shorter, more straightforward sentences. (Note: In his later years, Boylesve censured Ganderax for what he deemed "tyranny" regarding the style of authors he published.) In two articles from 1926, Les Nouvelles littéraires, artistiques et politiques corroborated the similarities between Proust and Boylesve, noting a "greater care for language" in the latter and identifying L'Enfant à la balustrade as a work in which Boylesve searches for lost time. Charles Du Bos also underscored the "solidity" of Boylesve's style during this period, likening it to that of Gustave Flaubert.

Marcel Proust identified Boylesve as a successor to Honoré de Balzac, noting the frequent focus of their works on Touraine. This "literary lineage" was also emphasized by other critics. Nevertheless, Boylesve eschewed Balzacian allusions when his novel, initially titled Comédie sous la balustrade—hinting at a connection to La Comédie humaine—was eventually published as L'Enfant à la balustrade. However, Boylesve employed the term "comedy" in the novel's preface to delineate the contrived quality of certain behaviors.

== Critique ==
=== Reception ===
On 15 or 16 May 1903, Marcel Proust wrote to Antoine Bibesco, urging him to "read without delay Boylesve’s sublime novel [Comédie sous la balustrade, the first version of L'Enfant à la balustrade] in La Renaissance [latine]." Georges Casella, on 15 November 1903, in Revue Illustrée, praised the novel as a "masterpiece," comparing it to Les Vacances d'un jeune homme sage, another novel by Henri de Régnier. Conversely, on 2 November 1903, Léon Blum, literary critic for Gil Blas, was more reserved, acknowledging the novel's "variety, vivid flavor, precision, and richness of detail" but noting a tendency to "slip... into a certain dragging diffuseness."

L'Enfant à la balustrade was initially considered for the inaugural Prix Goncourt, which was awarded in 1903. The novel received support from Léon Hennique, but ultimately, the prize was bestowed upon John-Antoine Nau for Force ennemie. (Note: Bourgeois 1958, p. 230) In a later account, a critic from Les Nouvelles littéraires, artistiques et politiques suggested that Boylesve's novel had not won the prize for reasons unrelated to its quality. It was alleged that the author of La Becquée had married well and was therefore not in need.

In November 1904, André Gide made an entry in his journal mentioning the novel L'Enfant à la balustrade, which he had read aloud. In a similar vein, Jean Ernest-Charles, writing in La Revue politique et littéraire, commended the novel's "emotionally precise analysis" and "faithful depiction of provincial manners." However, he also offered constructive criticism, suggesting that Boylesve may have limited the scope of his subject matter by focusing on a single narrative thread and that his writing could have benefited from a more spontaneous approach.

In the supplement to the 1906 edition of the Nouveau Larousse illustré, the section on René Boylesve refers to L'Enfant à la balustrade as a novel in which the author employs graceful, subtle irony and keen observation of the picturesque to describe the customs and figures of a small town.

=== Through the 20th and 21st centuries ===
Following the demise of Boylesve, a plethora of articles were published in the literary press. In the 23 January 1926 edition of Les Nouvelles littéraires, artistiques et politiques, Edmond Jaloux lauded Boylesve's prowess in regional novels, including L'Enfant à la balustrade, for their ability to imbue the mundane routines of provincial life, often perceived as tedious and monotonous, with a touch of poetic enchantment. The following day, Henry Bidou published an article in Les Annales politiques et littéraires in which he praised the opening sections of L'Enfant à la balustrade, describing them as "enchanting." However, he also offered a note of caution, suggesting that the novel's appeal lies not in its ability to evoke dreams, but in its capacity to engage the reader in the present moment.

In his capacity as a literary critic for La Nouvelle Revue française and author of the 1936 work Histoire de la littérature française de 1789 à nos jours, Albert Thibaudet described L'Enfant à la balustrade as "one of the purest portrayals of provincial life."

In his 1956 work, L'œuvre de Boylesve avec des documents inédits, Jean Ménard characterizes the novel's style as one that "combines irony and poetry."

In 1961, Rencontre Editions bestowed the 1903 Prize upon L'Enfant à la balustrade, which was the sole accolade the work was to receive. (Note: Trémouilloux 2010, p. 180) In 1964, Louis Chaigne posited that the work might be considered a masterpiece by Boylesve. In a 1969 lecture, Pierre Joulia described L'Enfant à la balustrade as written "in the style of a less sentimental Alphonse Daudet, and both [alongside La Becquée] represent Boylesve at his best." Around the same time, Joseph Majault was more captivated by the form—and by "the refinement of the language"—than the content.

In the critical discourse, L'Enfant à la Balustrade is often situated alongside Mademoiselle Cloque and La Becquée. These works are frequently regarded as epitomizing the essence of Boylesve's oeuvre, as evidenced by a 2009 article in Revue d'Histoire littéraire de la France.

== Writing and publication ==
=== Manuscripts and projects ===
Two autograph versions of René Boylesve's manuscript are preserved in the Bibliothèque nationale de France. One is incomplete, while the other is annotated. They are cataloged under the call number NAF 13286.

Two typed manuscript versions, annotated by Boylesve, are housed in the municipal library of Tours under the catalog numbers Ms. 2183 and Ms. 2184. The first is titled La Brouille ou l'Enfant à la balustrade, while the second served as the basis for the serialized edition (Comédie sous la balustrade).

In Feuilles tombées (a posthumous publication of his notes), Boylesve appears to have contemplated in 1912 composing a novel that would depict the triumph of a "smiling stoicism" over all injustices and mediocrity. This potential novel, which might have been titled Higher Balustrades, would have been written by the author of L'Enfant à la balustrade.

=== Editions ===
==== Serialized ====
The novel was serialized in four parts under the title Comédie sous la balustrade in La Renaissance latine from 15 May to 15 August 1903. However, the text that appeared in the serialized version differed slightly from the text that was eventually published in book form. (Note: Trémouilloux 2010, p. 175) (Note: La Renaissance latine was a brief, thirty-eight-issue monthly magazine that combined literary, artistic, and political content. It was published from 15 May 1902, to 15 June 1905.)

==== Book format ====
Upon its publication in book form, the novel was divided into four parts, each comprising 11, 10, 23, and 14 chapters, respectively. This structure was maintained in accordance with that of the serialized version.

==== In French ====
- L'Enfant à la balustrade. Paris: Calmann-Lévy. 1903. Original edition reprinted twenty-one times during Boylesve's lifetime, which, according to Henry Bidou, constitutes a relatively small print run.
- L'Enfant à la balustrade. Nelson. Paris: Calmann-Lévy. 1913. Illustrated by Claude Chopy
- L'Enfant à la balustrade. Paris: Le Livre. 1920. Illustrated by Pierre Brissaud
- L'Enfant à la balustrade. Lausanne: Éditions Rencontre. 1961.
- "L'Enfant à la balustrade". Le Petit Écho de la mode (Published as a supplement) (38–48). 1969.
- L'Enfant à la balustrade. Paris: Union générale d'éditions. 1988 [1913]. ISBN 978-2-2640-1114-5.
- L'Enfant à la balustrade. Monaco: Éditions du Rocher. 1988. ISBN 978-2-2680-4599-3.
- L'Enfant à la balustrade : roman. Paris: Éditions Libretto. 2017. ISBN 978-2-3691-4335-2.

==== Other languages ====
- The House on the Hill. A Story of French Country Life. Translated by Hutchinson, Jane. London: David Nutt. 1904.
- El Niño en la balaustrada (in Spanish). Translated by Gómez de La Mata, Germán. Valence: Prometeo. 1921.

== See also ==
- 20th-century French literature

== Bibliography ==
=== General works ===
- Gide, André (1986). Journal [Diary] (in French). Vol. 1. Gallimard.
- Majault, Joseph (1972). Littérature de notre temps [Literature of our time] (in French). Casterman.

=== Monographs ===
- Bourgeois, André (1945). René Boylesve, l'homme, le peintre de la Touraine [René Boylesve, the man and painter of Touraine] (in French). Paris: Droz.
- Bourgeois, André (1950). René Boylesve et le problème de l'amour [René Boylesve and the problem of love] (in French). Droz. Archived from the original on 14 October 2023.
- Bourgeois, André (1958). La vie de René Boylesve [The life of René Boylesve] (in French). Vol. 1: Les enfances (1867–1896). Geneva, Paris: Droz, Minard. Archived from the original on 1 September 2023.
- Bourgeois, André (1967). René Boylesve, le poète (avec des documents inédits) [René Boylesve, the poet (with unpublished documents)] (in French). Vol. 53. Rice University Studies.
- Joulia, Pierre (1969). René Boylesve, sa vie, son œuvre : conférence au château royal de Loches [René Boylesve, his life, his work: conference at the Château Royal de Loches] (in French). Le Réveil lochois.
- Lefort, Edmond (1949). La Touraine de René Boylesve [René Boylesve's Touraine] (in French). Illustrated by M.-T. Mabille. Tours: Arrault.
- Ménard, Jean (1956). L'œuvre de Boylesve avec des documents inédits [Boylesve's work with previously unpublished documents] (in French). Nizet.
- Trémouilloux, François (2010). René Boylesve, un romancier du sensible (1867–1926) [René Boylesve, a sensitive novelist (1867-1926)] (in French). Presses universitaires François-Rabelais. ISBN 978-2-86906-336-5. Archived from the original on 1 September 2023.
- Voilquin, Jean (1938). L'Œuvre de René Boylesve [The work of René Boylesve] (in French). Librairie Oeters.

=== Journals ===
- Alanic, Mathilde (1904). "L'Enfant à la balustrade, par René Boylesve" [L'Enfant à la balustrade, by René Boylesve]. Angers-Artiste (in French): 196–198.
- Barret, Hélène (2017). "Toponymes et anthroponymes dans les romans de René Boylesve" [Toponyms and anthroponyms in the novels of René Boylesve]. Les Heures Boylesviennes (in French) (XLV): 27–37.
- Bidou, Henry (1926). "La carrière d'un écrivain" [A writer's career]. Les Annales politiques et littéraires (in French) (2222): 1–2.
- Chaudier, Stéphane (2004). "Proust et Boylesve : enfances entre deux siècles" [Proust and Boylesve: childhoods between two centuries]. Proust au tournant des siècles (in French). Éditions Minard – Lettres modernes: 133–144. Archived from the original on 9 September 2024.
- Gaudreau, Hélène (2002). "Écrivains méconnus du XXe siècle : René Boylesve" [Unsung writers of the 20th century: René Boylesve] (PDF). Nuit Blanche (in French) (89): 33–35. ISSN 0823-2490. Archived from the original (PDF) on 14 August 2023.
