= Pierre Lasserre =

French literary critic, journalist and essayist

Pierre Lasserre (1867–1930) was a French literary critic, journalist and essayist. He became Director of the École des Hautes-Études.

He was an agrégé in philosophy, contemporary with Henri Vaugeois and Louis Dimier. As a young man he was a strong nationalist and anti-Dreyfusard. He was the leading literary critic of Action française and the author of the first work on Charles Maurras. Along with Georges Valois, Lasserre was one of the first to work to incorporate Nietzschean themes into neoroyalism.

== Biography ==
Lasserre defended neo-classicism against romanticism, which he tied to the ideals of the French Revolution. He upheld a controversial thesis on this topic in 1907, on French Romanticism, at the University of Paris. Part of his general argument, that the French romantics had damaged the concept of monarchy, was influenced from the side of the Action Française and Maurras. That strand of anti-romanticism, close to that of the essayist Ernest Seillière and the counterrevolutionary tradition, later affected Carl Schmitt and his Politische Romantik of 1919.

Up to World War I, Lasserre was a militant, associating with Charles Péguy and digesting the ideas of Georges Sorel. He opposed the trend of modernisation in the university system, supporting classical and humane studies. His colleagues Henri Massis and Alfred de Tard were concerned also at the perceived falling away of classics at the Sorbonne.

In 1914, Lasserre broke with Maurras and the Action française. Others in the circle had made much of a crude form of his arguments on romanticism: Louis Reynaud had claimed German romanticism was corrupting of contemporary French culture, and Lasserre was Germanophile and not a subscriber to the nationalist line of the Action française.

He subsequently followed an orthodox academic career.

== Works ==
- La Crise chrétienne. Questions d'aujourd'hui, Paris, Perrin, 1891.
- Charles Maurras et la Renaissance classique, Paris, Mercure de France, 1902.
- Les Idées de Nietzsche sur la musique, Paris, Mercure de France, 1905.
- Le Romantisme français. Essai sur la révolution dans les sentiments et dans les idées au XIXe siècle. Thèse présentée à la Faculté des lettres de l'Université de Paris, Paris, Mercure de France, 1907.
- Le crime de Biodos, Paris, Plon-Nourrit et Cie, [1912].
- (with René de Marans), La Doctrine officielle de l'Université. Critique du haut enseignement de l'État. Défense et théorie des humanités classiques, Paris, Mercure de France, 1912.
- Le Germanisme et l'esprit humain, Paris, Champion, 1915.
- Frédéric Mistral. Poète, moraliste, citoyen, Paris, Payot, 1918.
- Les chapelles littéraires : Claudel, Jammes, Péguy, Paris, Garnier et frères, 1920.
- Cinquante ans de pensée française. Le Germanisme et l'esprit humain. Virgile et la guerre. L'École de l'art pour l'art. La Poésie française et le Midi. Les Humanités classiques et la vie nationale, Paris, Plon-Nourrit et Cie, 1922.
- Mes routes, Paris, Plon-Nourrit et Cie, 1924.
- La Jeunesse d'Ernest Renan. Histoire de la crise religieuse au XIXe siècle, Paris, Garnier et frères, 1925.
- La Statue volée. Méditations, Paris, Le Divan, 1927.
- Des romantiques à nous, Paris, La Nouvelle revue critique, 1927.
- Georges Sorel. Théoricien de l'impérialisme: ses idées, son action, Paris, L’Artisan du livre, 1928.
- Faust en France et autres études, Paris, Calmann-Lévy, 1929.
- « Préface », Édouard Krakowski, Une philosophie de l'amour et de la beauté. L'Esthétique de Plotin et son influence, Paris, E. de Boccard, 1929.
- Trente années de vie littéraire. Pages choisies par A. Bilis, préface d'André Bellessort, Paris, Prométhée, 1929.
- Un conflit religieux au XIIe siècle. Abélard contre saint Bernard, Paris, L’Artisan du livre, 1930.
- Mise au point, Paris, L’Artisan du livre, 1931.
- Philosophie du goût musical. Nouvelle édition, suivie de trois études sur Grétry. Rameau, Wagner, Paris, Calmann-Lévy, 1931.
- Lourdes, Saint Sever, D. Chabas, « Villes du sud-ouest », 1933.

Works in English translation

- "Germanism and the Human Mind: The Question," The New Age, Vol. XIX, No. 22, 1916.
- "Germanism and the Human Mind: Some German Accessible to European Mind," The New Age, Vol. XIX, No. 23, 1916.
- "Germanism and the Human Mind: A Characteristic of German Philosophy," The New Age, Vol. XIX, No. 24, 1916.
- "Germanism and the Human Mind: The Position of Kantism," The New Age, Vol. XIX, No. 25, 1916.
- "Germanism and the Human Mind: Subjective Idealism," The New Age, Vol. XIX, No. 26, 1916.
- The Spirit of French Music, Kegan Paul, Trench, Trubner & Co., ltd., 1921.
