= René Boylesve =

French author

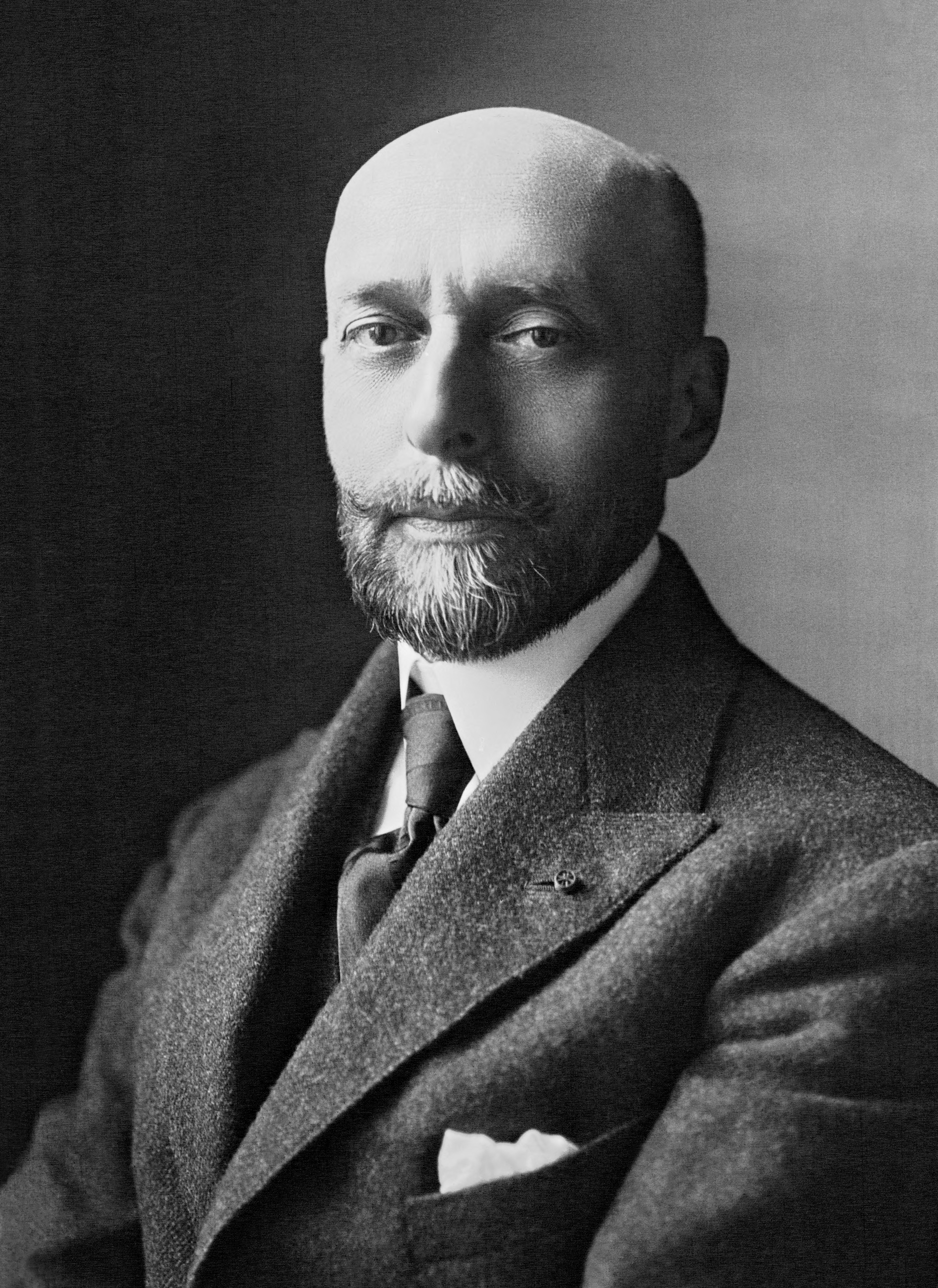
- Boylesve in 1921
- Born: René Tardiveau; 14 April 1867; La Haye-Descartes, France
- Died: 14 January 1926 (aged 58); Paris, France
- Writing career
- Notable awards: Election to the Académie française in 1919

René Boylesve (French pronunciation: [ʁəne bwalɛv]; 14 April 1867 in La Haye-Descartes – 14 January 1926 in Paris), born René Marie Auguste Tardiveau ([ʁəne maʁi oɡyst taʁdivo]), was a French writer and a literary critic.

== Biography ==
Boylesve was orphaned early and went to school in Poitiers and Tours. In 1895 he began to publish articles in various journals. He is considered the heir of Honoré de Balzac and precursor of Marcel Proust. In 1919 he was inducted into the Académie française.

== Works ==
- Le Médecin des Dames de Néans (1896),
- Le Parfum des Îles Borromées (1898)
- Mademoiselle Cloque (1899),
- La Becquée (1901),
- La Leçon d’amour dans un parc (1902),
- L’Enfant à la balustrade (1903),
- Le Meilleur ami (1909),
- La Jeune Fille Bien élevée (1909),
- Madeleine jeune femme (1912),
- Élise (1921),
- Nouvelles leçons d’amour dans un parc (1924),
- Souvenirs du jardin détruit (1924),
- Je vous ai désirée un soir (1925),
- Feuilles tombées (1927).

== Bibliography ==
- Dictionnaire des lettres françaises, sixth volume: Le xxe siècle. LGF-Le Livre de Poche, Paris 1998, ISBN 2-253-13109-1 (in French)
- Jean Ménard: L'oeuvre de René Boylesve. Librairie Nizet, Paris 1956 (in French)
- Marc Piguet: René Boylesve, l’Homme à la balustrade. Éditions Pays et Terroirs, Cholet 2007 (in French)
- François Trémouilloux: René Boylesve, Romancier du sensible, Presses Universitaires François Rabelais, Tours 2010 (in French)
