= Ferdinand Brunetière =

French writer and critic (1849–1906)

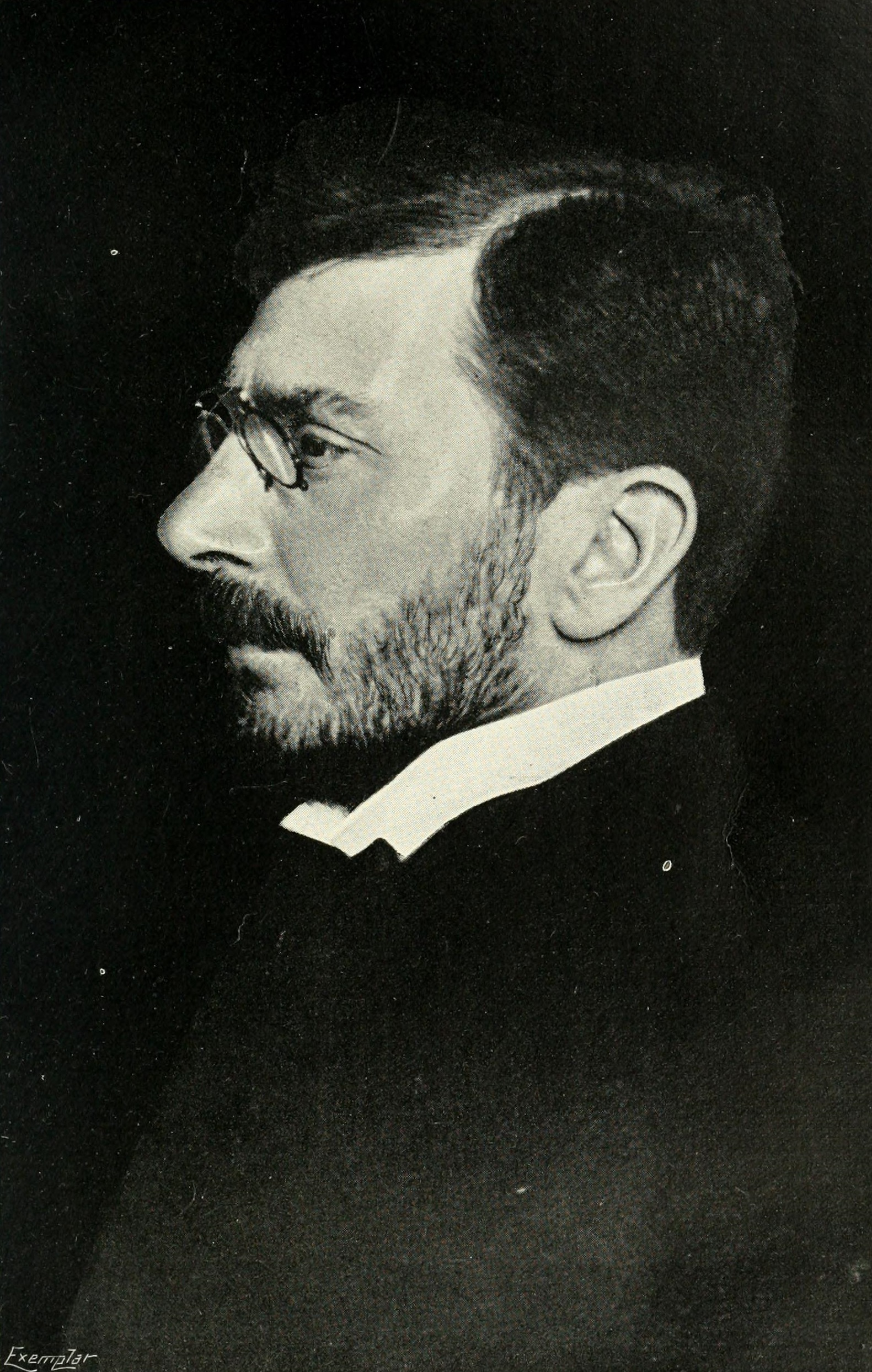
- Born: Ferdinand Vincent-de-Paul Marie Brunetière; 19 July 1849; Toulon, France
- Died: 9 December 1906 (aged 57); Paris, France
- Occupation: Literary critic
- Writing career
- Language: French

Ferdinand Vincent-de-Paul Marie Brunetière (French pronunciation: [fɛʁdinɑ̃ vɛ̃sɑ̃ də pɔl maʁi bʁyntjɛʁ]; 19 July 1849 – 9 December 1906) was a French writer and critic.

== Personal and public life ==
=== Early years ===
Ferdinand Vincent-de-Paul Marie Brunetière was born in Toulon, Var, Provence. After school at Marseille, he studied in Paris at the Lycée Louis-le-Grand. Desiring a teaching career, he entered for examination at the École Normale Supérieure, but failed, and the outbreak of war in 1870 prevented him trying again. He turned to private tuition and literary criticism. After the publication of successful articles in the Revue Bleue, he became connected with the Revue des Deux Mondes, first as contributor, then as secretary and sub-editor, and finally, in 1893, as principal editor.

=== Career ===
In 1886 Brunetière was appointed professor of French language and literature at the École Normale, a singular honour for one who had not passed through the academic mill; and later he presided with distinction over various conferences at the Sorbonne and elsewhere. He was decorated with the Legion of Honour in 1887, and became a member of the Académie française in 1893.

The published works of Brunetière consist largely of reprinted papers and lectures. They include six series of Études critiques (1880–1898) on French history and literature; Le Roman naturaliste (1883); Histoire et Littérature, three series (1884–1886); Questions de critique (1888; second series, 1890). The first volume of L'Évolution de genres dans l'histoire de la littérature, lectures in which a formal classification, founded on Darwinism, is applied to the phenomena of literature, appeared in 1890; and his later works include a series of studies (2 vols, 1894) on the evolution of French lyrical poetry during the 10th century, a history of French classic literature begun in 1904, a monograph on Honoré de Balzac (1906), and various pamphlets of a polemical nature dealing with questions of education, science and religion. Among these may be mentioned Discours académiques (1901), Discours de combat (1900, 1903), L'Action sociale du Christianisme (1904), Sur les chemins de la croyance (1905).

=== Political activity ===
Brunetière was a leading member of the anti-Dreyfusards.

=== Personal views ===
Before 1895 Brunetière was widely known as a rationalist, freethinking scholar. That year, however, he published an article, "Après une visite au Vatican" (After a Visit to the Vatican), in which he argued that science was incapable of providing a convincing social morality and that faith alone could achieve that result. This work introduced the metaphor of the "bankruptcy of science".

Shortly afterwards, Brunetière converted to Roman Catholicism. As a Catholic, he was orthodox and his political sympathies were conservative. He authored the article on "Literary and Theological Appreciation of Bossuet" for the Catholic Encyclopedia.

== Works ==
- Études Critiques sur l’Histoire de la Littérature Française (8 vols., 1880–1907).
- Le Roman Naturaliste (1883).
- Histoire et Littérature (3 vols., 1884).
- Questions de Critique (1888).
- Nouvelles Questions de Critique (1890).
- Évolution de la Critique (1890).
- Évolution des Genres dans l’Histoire de la Littérature (2 vols., 1890).
- Epoques du Théâtre Français (2 vols., 1891–1892).
- Histoire de la Littérature Française Classique (4 vols., 1891–1892).
- Essais sur la Littérature Contemporaine (1892).
- Évolution de la Poésie Lyrique en France au dix-neuvième Siècle (2 vols., 1892–1894).
- La Science et la Religion (1895).
- Nouveaux Essais sur la Littérature Contemporaine (1895).
- Bases de la Croyance (1896).
- La Renaissance de l'Idéalisme (1896).
- Manuel de l’Histoire de la Littérature Française (1898).
- Discours Académiques (1901).
- Les Raisons Actuelles de Croire (1901).
- Victor Hugo (2 vols., 1902).
- Variétés Littéraires (1904).
- Cinq Lettres sur Ernest Renan (1904).
- Sur les Chemins de la Croyance (1904).
- Honoré de Balzac, 1799–1850 (1906).
- Discours de Combat (3 vols., 1900–1907).
- Lettres de Combat (posthumous, 1912).

Translated into English

- Essays in French Literature (1898, D. Nichol Smith)
- Manual of the History of French Literature (1898).
- Honoré de Balzac (1906). 2nd edition (1907).
- The Law of the Drama (1914).
- Science and Religion (2016, Erik Butler).

== Bibliography ==
- Dirk, Hoeges, Studien zur französischen Literaturkritik im 19.Jahrhundert. Taine - Brunetière - Hennequin - Guyau, Carl Winter Universitätsverlag, Heidelberg 1980. ISBN 3-533-02857-7
