= Louis Lucien Faure-Dujarric =

French sportsman and artist

- Self-portrait as an athlete (before 1900)
- Born: 24 January 1872; Paris (9th), France
- Died: 30 November 1958 (aged 86); Paris (15th), France
- Occupations: Athlete; painter; poster artist; lithographer; illustrator

Louis Lucien Faure-Dujarric (24 January 1872 – 30 November 1958) was a French cyclist, painter, poster artist, lithographer, and illustrator.

== Biography ==
Louis Lucien was the eldest son of Marie Alice Emma Vermeil and the architect and engraver Louis Faure, known as Pierre-Lucien Faure-Dujarric (1828–1904). His younger brother was the architect Louis Faure-Dujarric (1875-1943). A student at Lycée Lakanal, in 1889 he founded the Sport-Athlétique association with his schoolmate Frantz Reichel, a future rugby union champion, under the patronage of Pierre de Coubertin. Historically, this was the first sports association for French secondary-school students. In 1892, he finished third in the French Cross Country Championships in the long-distance cross-country event.

He entered the École des Beaux-Arts de Paris, where he studied drawing under Constant Moyaux and Léon Bonnat.

Beginning in the 1890s, while an amateur cyclist, he signed his first compositions on Lithographic limestone "L. Lucien Faure". His advertising posters depicted the worlds of sport and music hall and was thus among the artists associated with Art Nouveau.

In May 1899, he took part in a motor race in Suresnes, held at night, a fashionable social gathering attended by Pierre Giffard, Pierre Lafitte and Rodolphe Darzens, among other competitors.

He contributed to periodicals including Le Cycle, La Bicyclette, Le Monde artiste, Les Sports athlétiques, La Vie au grand air, Le Soleil du dimanche, Le Tout Lyon, and the magazine Le Yacht. He illustrated the sheet music in the collections of Paris-Chansons, published by G. Astruc & Cie.

Around 1900, he opened an art printing works in Paris at 12 Rue Sainte-Anne, which moved around 1904 to 7 Rue Papillon.

He later became a consulting engineer and divorced Élina Charlotte Dubeau. He died in the 15th arrondissement of Paris on 30 November 1958.

=== Lithographic posters ===
Creations before 1905 (source: BnF)

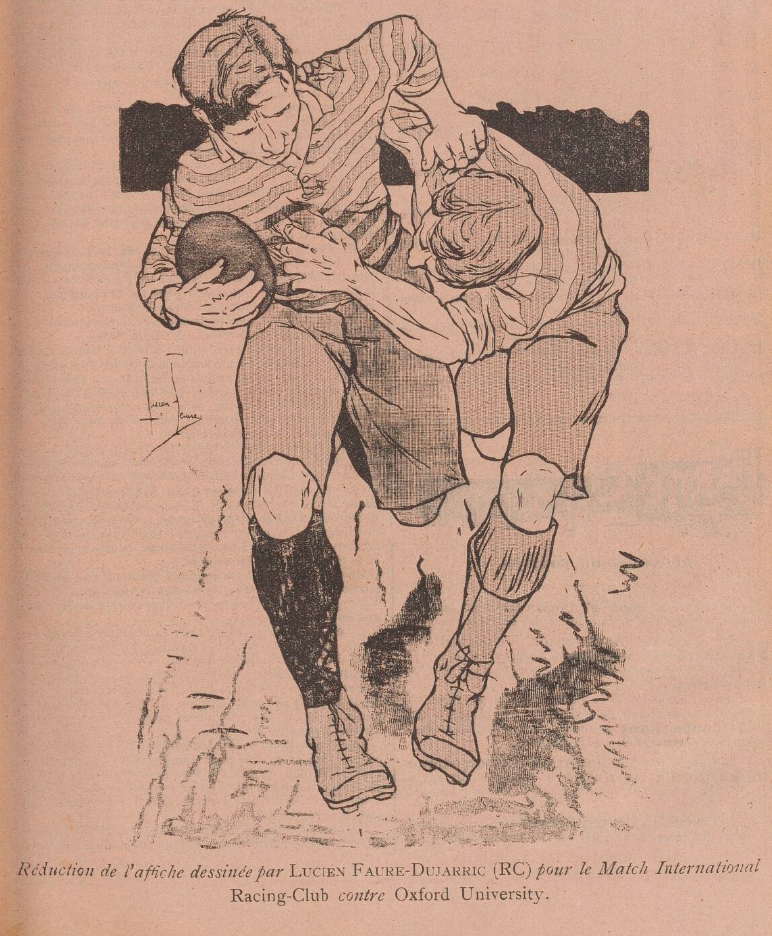
Rugby Players

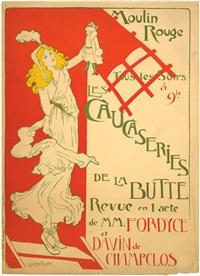
Moulin Rouge – Les Caucaseries de la Butte

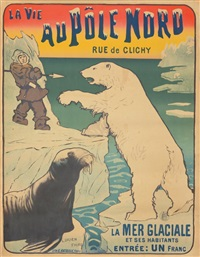
La Vie au Pôle Nord

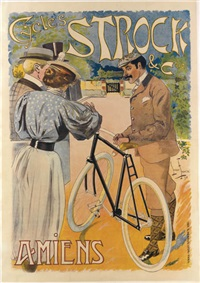
Cycles Strock & Cie, Amiens

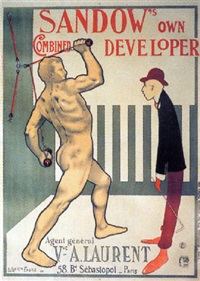
Sandow's own Combiner Developper

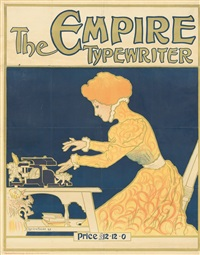
The Empire Typewriter

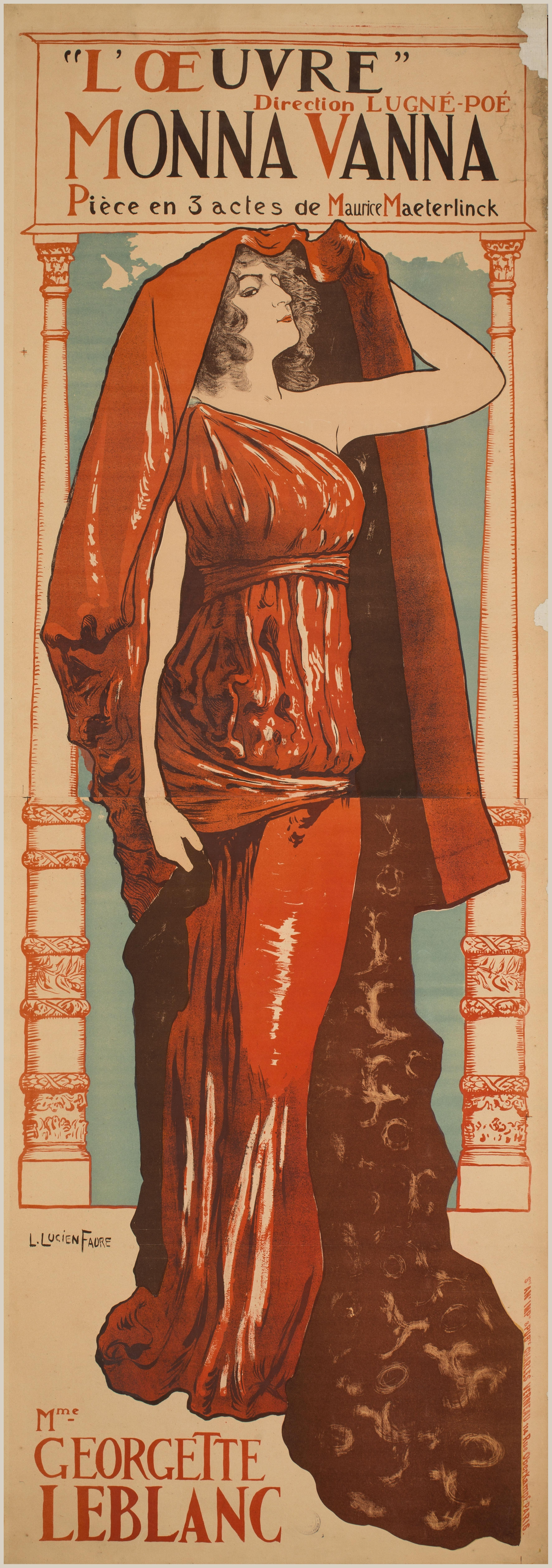
L'Œuvre, Monna Vanna … Georgette Leblanc

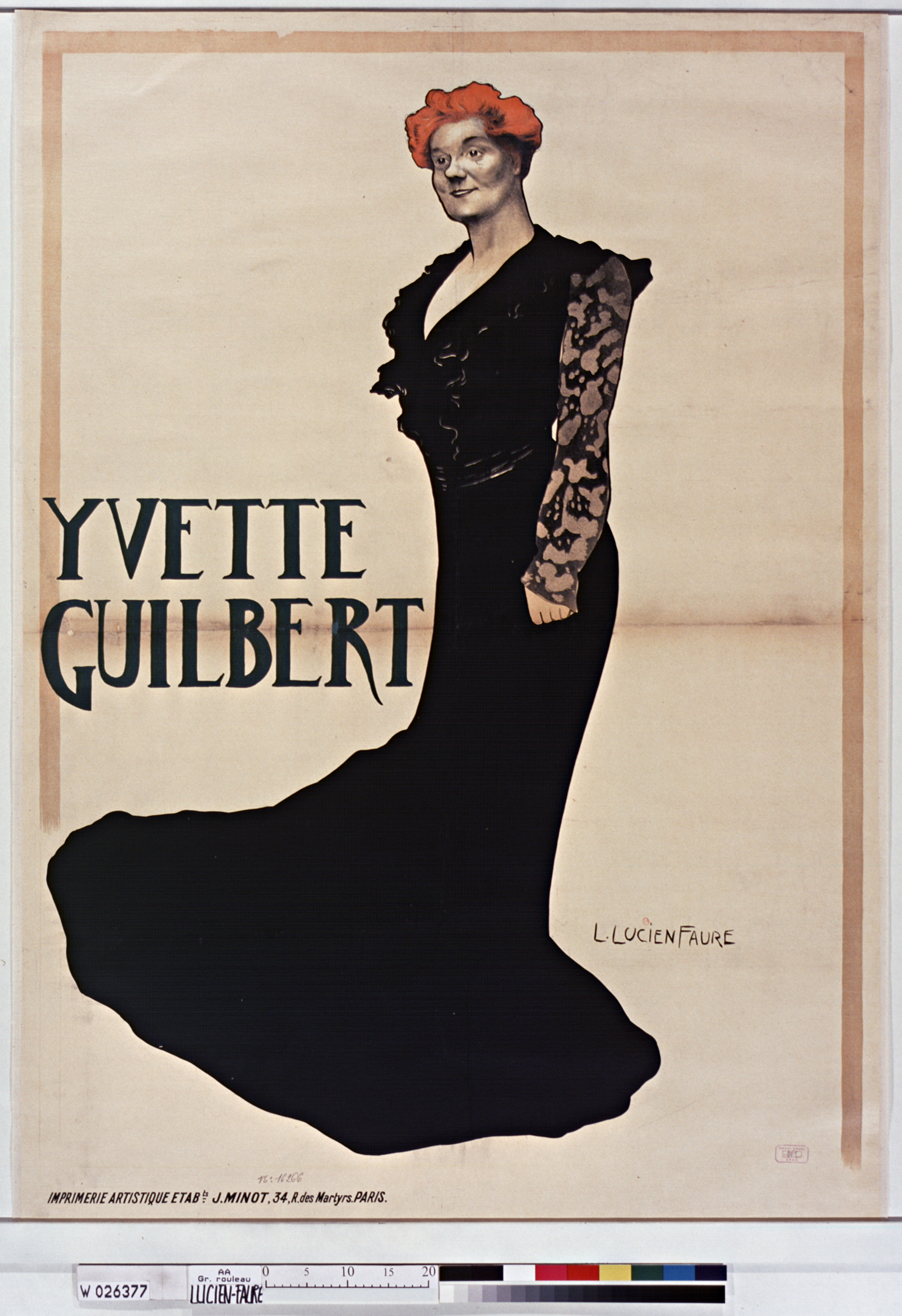
Yvette Guilbert

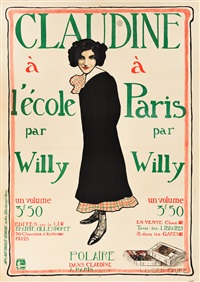
Claudine at School

=== Illustrated books ===
- L. P. Reichel, La Vélocipédie dans le mouvement athlétique, Paris, Ch. Delagrave, 1893.
- Maurice Leblanc, Gueule rouge, 80 chevaux, Paris, Ollendorff, 1904.
- Lily Lévy, Nuages, poèmes, wood engravings, Lucien Dorbon, 1934.
