= Henry Bidou =

French writer (1873–1943)

Henry Bidou (28 June 1873 – 14 February 1943) was a French writer, literary critic and war correspondent.

== Life ==
Born in Givet, Bidou studied at the Saint-Joseph de Reims jesuit college. He later joined the Institut catholique de Paris (ICP) and continued his studies until he obtained two doctoral theses on Siberia and then studied law, before becoming Professor of history, geography and literature at the Lycée privé Sainte-Geneviève, then at the ICP and the Faculty of Letters.

Bidou destined himself for a military career. He partially renounced it after a horse accident in his youth that led to the amputation of one of his legs. Since he couldn't perform his military service, he became a war correspondent and military columnist.

He had an eclectic professional career in a wide variety of professions: geographer, historian, journalist, lecturer, literary critic, musicographer, painter and poet. He took advantage of his missions abroad to satisfy his passion for travel, facilitated by his mastery of several foreign languages. Polyglot, he spoke French, English, German, Spanish, Italian and Russian.

An amateur painter, Bidou worked with Edmond Aman-Jean, Raphaël Collin and Jacques-Émile Blanche and exhibited at the Élysée gallery. He was a member of the "Société nationale de géographie" and the Institut historique de France.

It was his activity as a war correspondent that led him to Vichy in 1940 by the government of Marshal Pétain. It is in this city that he died in 1943.

== Traveller ==
Bidou made numerous trips to Russia as part of the writing of his theses on Siberia, then around the world for his other activities.

As a journalist or for his leisure time, he travelled through Poland, Uruguay, Japan, Cambodia, Indochina, the Rhineland, Italy, where he met Benito Mussolini, as well as Scandinavia and the Poles.

He followed military operations as a war correspondent in Syria, Lebanon and Morocco during the 1920s.

He drew several stories from his travels, such as Le Nid de cygnes after discovering the Nordic countries.

=== Journalist and critic ===
Bidou entered the Journal des débats in 1899, where he worked until 1929. As an editor, he wrote various columns Au jour le jour, La semaine dramatique, and military chronicles during the war, under the patronyme Colonel X. He served as war correspondent for the newspaper from 1915 to 1923.

He contributed to numerous newspapers over the years (Le Figaro, whose foreign policy services he directed between 1922 and 1925, the Revue des deux Mondes, Les Annales politiques et littéraires, Vu, Le Temps, Sept Jours, L'Opinion, La Revue critique des idées et des livres, Présent, L'Intransigeant, Paris-Soir, La Revue des revues, L’Éclair, Le Sillon, La Revue hebdomadaire, L'Ermitage and Voici la France de ce mois.

Bidou made himself also known as music critic for L'Opinion, and literary critic at La Revue de Paris.

== Author-lecturer ==
He published numerous works during his life, plays (Rosenice, 1894), novels (Marie de Sainte-Heureuse, 1912) as well as technical and specialised books, on his career as a teacher, researcher and traveller (Le Roman de la terre), on history (Le Château de Blois, 1931, Paris, 1937). In this field, he is the author of Volume IX, La Grande Guerre, of L’Histoire de France contemporaine depuis la Révolution jusqu'à la paix in 1919 by Ernest Lavisse.

Author of a book on Paul Claudel, he was preparing a study on Molière when he died.

He gave distinguished lectures throughout the world on various subjects: Alexandre Dumas for example, often at the invitation of the Ministry of Foreign Affairs.

== War correspondent ==
Despite his disability, Bidou took a close interest in military affairs. He was war correspondent on several occasions, during the First World War (attached to the GQG), during the Russo-Polish war, at the front in Syria alongside General Gouraud. He continued this activity during the Second World War and chronicled Paris-Soir until the day before his death.

This interest led him to become a professor at the École de guerre.

== Homages ==
Marshal Juin, one of his former listeners, quoted him in his reception speech at the Académie française and in Maurice Genevoix's reply speech, who described him as "a free and original spirit. »

His influence is confirmed by his mention in several other reception and response speeches, the speech of Robert Kemp, who describes his Histoire de la guerre as "masterly", that of Henry Bordeaux, André Bellessort, in the reply of Marcel Pagnol to Marcel Achard.

== Awards ==
- Croix de guerre 1914 -1918
- Officier de la Légion d’honneur
- Officer of the Order of Vasa
- Officer of the Order of the British Empire
- Commandeur of the Order of Polonia Restituta
- Commandeur of the Nicham Ifthikar
- Commandeur of the Order of the Medjidie
- Commandeur of the Royal Order of Cambodia
- Commandeur of the Order of the Crown of Italy

== Works ==
- 1894: Rosenice (play), Le Sillon
- 1912: Marie de Sainte-Heureuse (novel), Calmann-Lévy
- 1912: L’Année dramatique 1911-1912 (series of articles), Hachette
- 1913: L’Année dramatique 1912-1913 (series of articles), Hachette
- 1919: Les Conséquences de la guerre, Librairie Félix Alcan
- 1922: Histoire de France (Tome 9), Hachette
- 1922: Histoire de la Grande Guerre, Éditions Gallimard
- Henry Bidou (1925). Chopin (in French). Paris: Félix Alcan.; English translation: Henry Bidou (1927). Chopin (in French). New York: A. A. Knopf.
- 1929: Le Nid de Cygnes (novel), Flammarion
- 1930: C’est tout et ce n’est rien (novel), Calmann-Lévy
- 1931: Le château de Blois, Calmann-Lévy
- 1936: Berlin, Bernard Grasset
- 1937: Paris, Gallimard
- 1938: 900 lieues sur l’Amazone, Gallimard
- 1940: La Conquête des pôles, Gallimard
- 1940: La Bataille de France, Édition du Milieu du Monde
- 1944: L’Afrique, Flammarion (posthumous)
- La Terre héroïque

== Forewords ==
Henry Ruffin (1918). La Ruée, ou L'histoire d'une déception (juin 1917-avril 1918) (in French).

Kōstī́s Palamás (1931). Les Douze Paroles du tzigane. Le Cabinet cosmopolite (in French). Paris: Stock, Delamain et Boutelleau.

Léone Devimeur-Dieudonné. La Colombe blessée (in French). Paris: Albin Michel.

Edmond Stoullig. Le Théâtre de la Victoire. Les Annales du Théâtre et de la Musique (in French). Vol. 40e (1914-1915). Libr. Paul Ollendorff.

== Bibliography ==
- Jessica Ogeron (July 2013). Henry Bidou (1873-1943), auteur, critique littéraire et d’art dramatique, conférencier, professeur et correspondant de guerre (1880-2006) (PDF) (in French). Paris: Archives de Paris.
