= Notre-Dame de La Haye Church =

Notre-Dame de La Haye is a former parish church in the town of Descartes

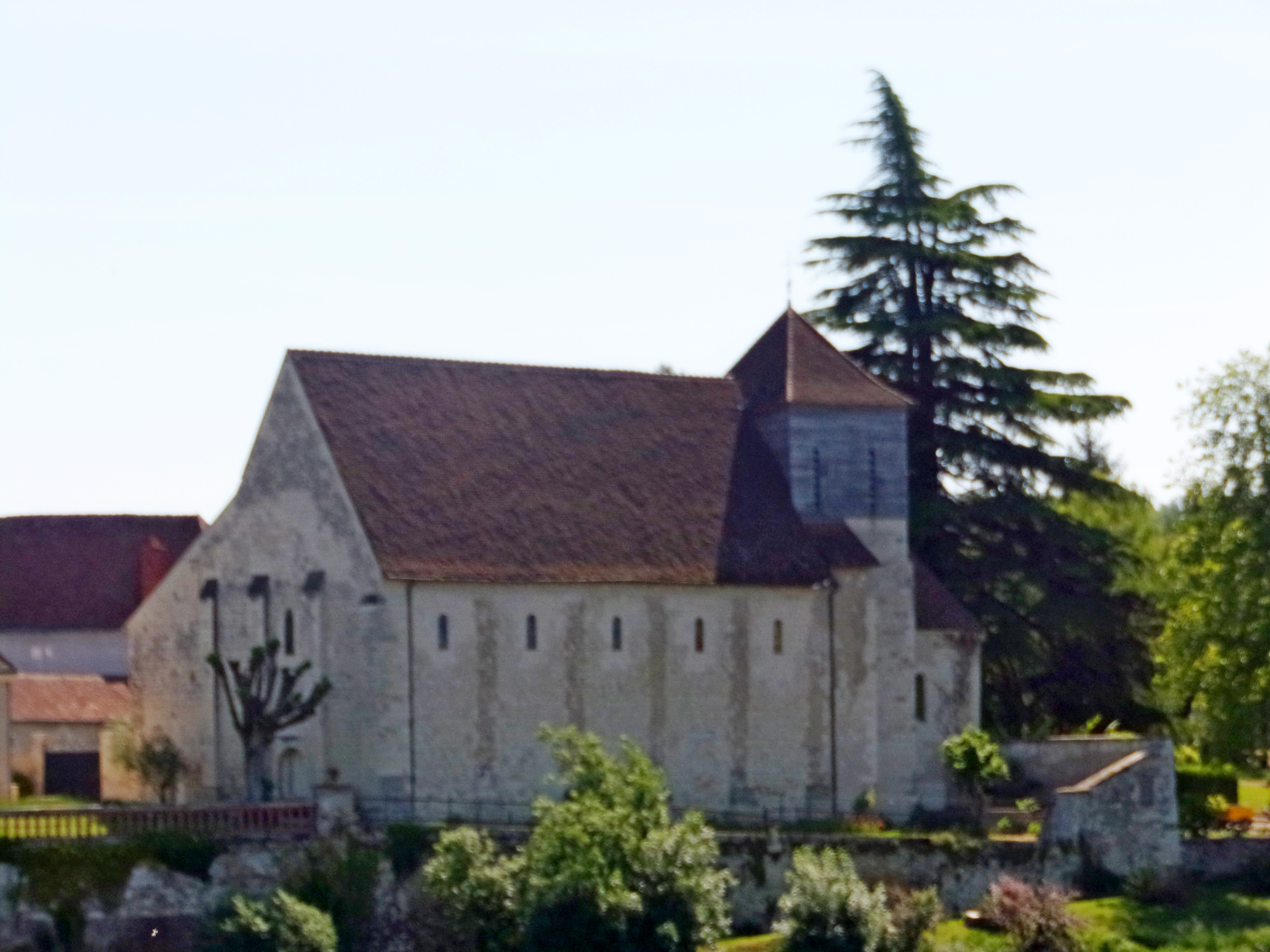
- Notre-Dame de La Haye Church

- 46°58′17″N 0°41′44″E
- Location: Centre-Val de Loire
- Country: France

History
- Founded: 1104

Architecture
- Completed: 1220

Administration
- Parish: Notre-Dame de La Haye

Notre-Dame de La Haye is a former parish church in the town of Descartes, in the French department of Indre-et-Loire.

The church, a former castral chapel founded in the Romanesque period but enlarged in the Gothic style, became a parish church. It retained this status until the French Revolution, when it was sold as national property.

Converted into a barn, its condition gradually deteriorated. Restoration work began in the 1980s, and the church was listed as a historic monument in 1981 and again in 1994.

== Location ==
The church is located on the right bank of the Creuse, to the east of the Henri-IV bridge, within what was the Château de La Haye in the Middle Ages; it is surrounded by a moat and occupies the western part of the castral site.

== History ==
The church is the only vestige of the castle of La Haye, built on the initiative of Foulques Nerra in the 11th century, later destroyed, and occupying the site of the René-Boylesve garden. The castle chapel was founded in 1104, but became the parish church of Notre-Dame de La Haye in 1220.

It is possible that only the apse, choir and transept were built during the Romanesque period, later supplemented by the nave, which was undoubtedly offset to adapt to the topography. During the 13th century, the church was enlarged to the north by the addition of a side aisle to adapt to its new function. Its bell tower may have been destroyed in 1566, during the Wars of Religion.

In 1789, it was closed to worship, then definitively disused when the two parishes of the new commune were united, with Saint Georges, as the sole parish church.

In the mid-twentieth century, it was used as a fodder barn. Restoration work began in the 1980s, with a new roof structure and wooden bell tower. Two parts of the old church were listed as historic monuments in 1981 and 1994 respectively.

== Description ==
=== Architecture ===
Floor plan

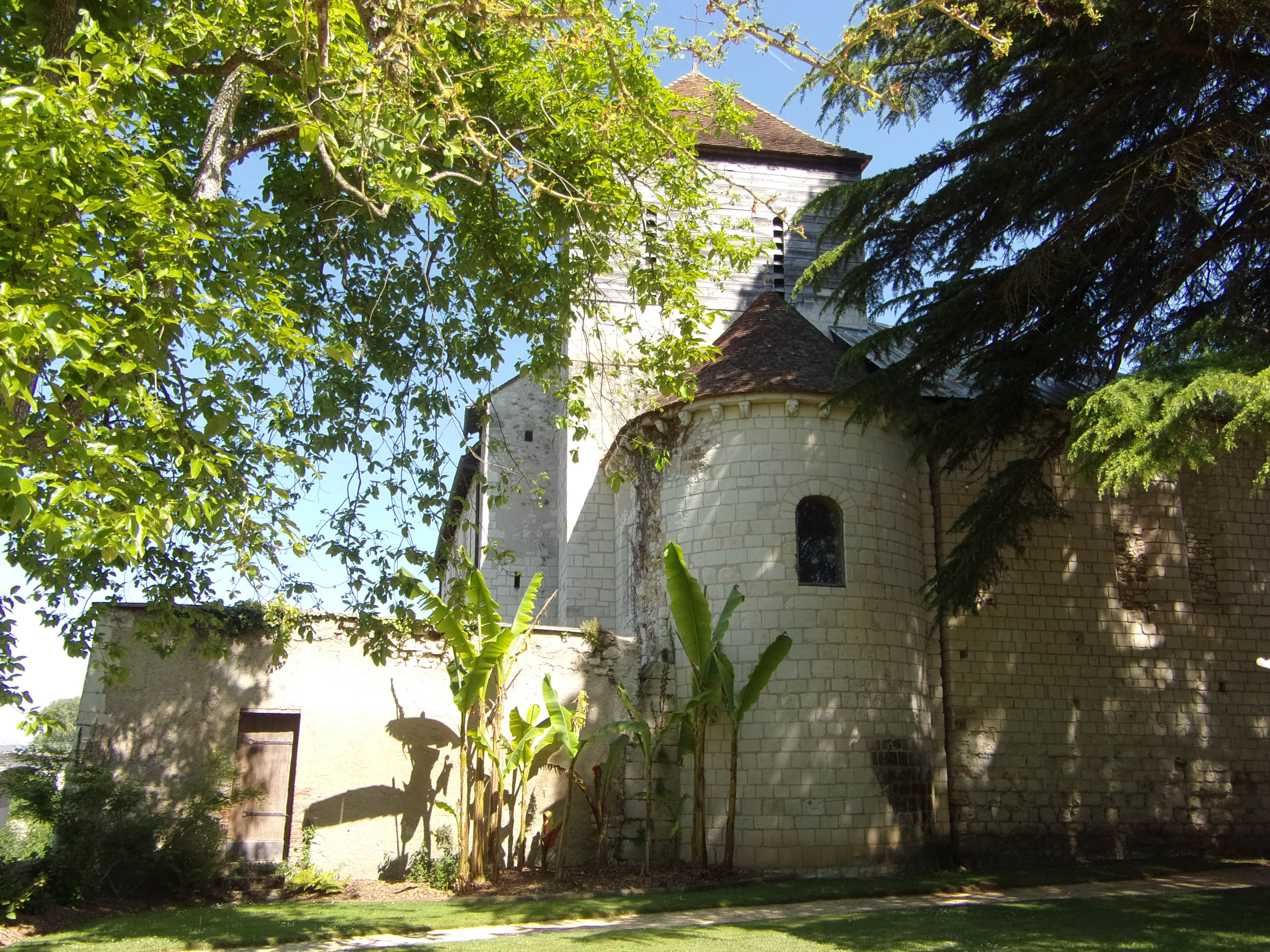
View of the apse

The floor plan of the church consists of a nave (17.50 × 9.40 m) open to the west and leading to a narrower transept crossing to the east, with its median axis more to the south. This crossing continues into a single-bay, trapezoidal choir ending in a semicircular apse. Some remains of the original bell tower remain above this crossing. The transept extends only to the north of the crossing, and is prolonged to the east by a chapel. To the south, a turret containing a Saint-Gilles spiral staircase provides access to the attic. A side aisle widens the nave to the north; its northern gutter wall is extended by those of the transept and the chapel.

The apse is barrel-vaulted, the choir bay is Romanesque semi-circular and the side aisle is covered with Western Gothic vaults. The nave is covered by a panelled vault.

=== Decoration ===
The interior walls of the church were probably frescoed, but only a few fragments remain, depicting rural scenes (reaper and sickle, farmer and flail). A niche in the southern wall of the chancel was designed to house instruments of worship.

== See also ==
- List of historical monuments in Indre-et-Loire (A-J)

== Bibliography ==
- Couderc, Jean-Mary, ed. (1987). Dictionnaire des communes de Touraine [Dictionary of the communes of Touraine] (in French). Chambray-lès-Tours: CLD. ISBN 978-2854431360.
- de Saint-Jouan, Arnaud (1996). "« Descartes: église Notre-Dame de La Haye »" [“Descartes: Notre-Dame de La Haye church"]. Bulletin de la Société archéologique de Touraine (in French): 847–858.
- Flohic, Jean-Luc, ed. (2001). Patrimoine des communes d'Indre-et-Loire [Heritage of Indre-et-Loire communes] (in French). Paris: Flohic. ISBN 2842341155.
- Marzais, Amaelle. De la main à l’esprit : étude sur les techniques et les styles des peintures murales dans l’ancien diocèse de Tours (XIe et XVe siècles) (Thesis) (in French). Tours: Université de Tours.
- Ranjard, Robert (1986). La Touraine archéologique : guide du touriste en Indre-et-Loire [La Touraine archéologique: a tourist's guide to Indre-et-Loire] (in French) (3rd ed.). Mayenne: Imprimerie de la Manutention. ISBN 978-2855540177.
