= Robert Kemp (literary critic) =

French journalist and literary critic

Robert Kemp (8 October 1878, Paris – 3 July 1959) was a French journalist and literary critic, writing for L'Aurore, La Liberté, Le Temps and Le Monde (successor to Temps). On 29 November 1956 he was elected to seat 5 of the Académie française.

Kemp's literary criticism drew commentary in academic journals,, and pastiche and imitation by other authors.
