= Louis Ganderax =

French journalist and theater critic (1855–1940)

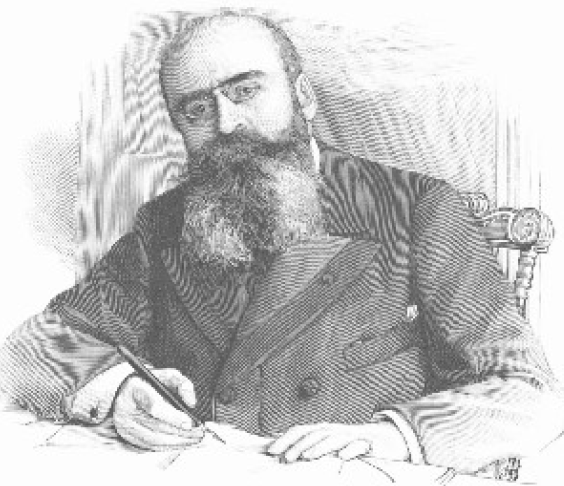
- Born: 25 February 1855; Paris, France
- Died: January 1940 (aged 84); Croissy-sur-Seine, France
- Occupations: Journalist; Drama critic

Charles Étienne Louis Ganderax (25 February 1855 – January 1940) was a French journalist and drama critic. He was literary editor of the Revue de Paris with Henri Meilhac, a member of the Académie française.

A student at the École Normale Supérieure (1873), agrégé de lettres (1876), he collaborated with Le Parlement, Le Figaro, the Revue bleue, L’Univers illustré, La Vie parisienne, Le Gaulois, Revue illustrée, Revue des deux mondes etc.

== Works ==
- Miss Fanfare
- Pepa, comedy in 3 acts (with Henri Meilhac), created at the Comédie-Française, 31 October 1888

Prefaces

- Georges Bizet, Lettres... Impressions de Rome, 1857-1860. La Commune, 1871.
- 1904: Contes parisiens du second Empire (1866)...
