= Le Monde artiste =

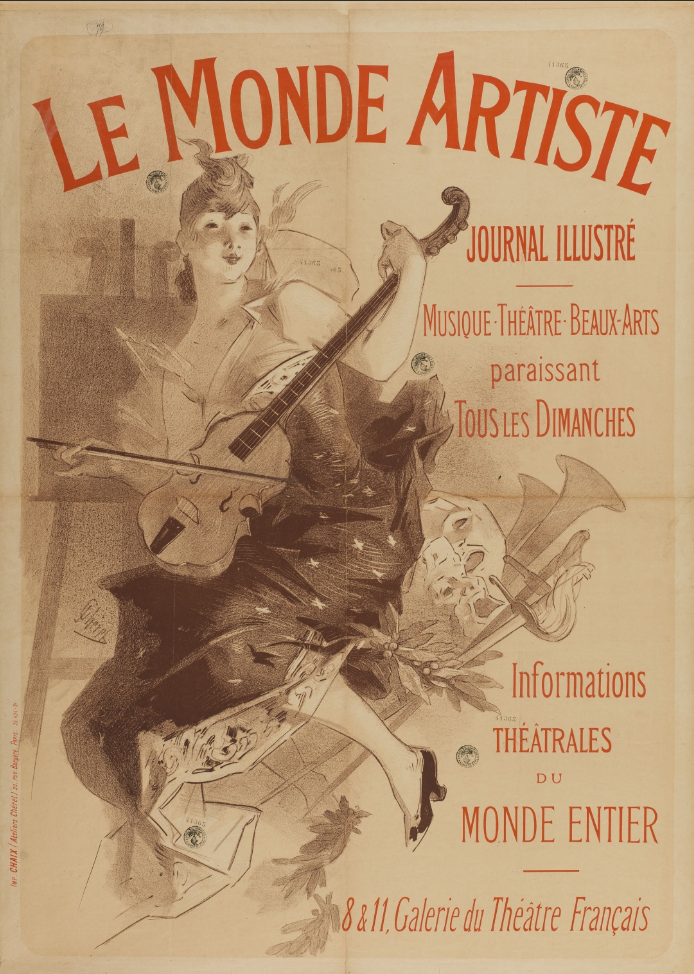
Poster by Jules Chéret (1891).

Le Monde artiste (literally The Artistic World) later Le Monde artiste illustré was a French weekly newspaper on musical, literary, visual arts and theatre news. It was founded in December 1862 and ceased publication in 1914.

== History ==
It was founded in Paris by Achille Philibert Lemoine (1813-1895), head of Éditions Henry Lemoine, which specialised in publishing musical scores. Published at the end of the week, it initially had four unillustrated pages and covered all arts events in France and Europe thanks to its network of correspondents. It first chief editor was Henri Gourdon de Genouillac and it was initially based at 27 rue Laffitte.

Lemoine managed it, assisted by his son Henry-Félicien, and he was soon joined by Léon Grus (1835-1902) and Eugène Lavigne, director of the Agence générale des théâtres It cost 30 centimes.

The weekly format evolved early in the 1890s, adding illustrations and renaming it Le Monde artiste illustré. It introduced a new format designed by Jules Chéret and engraved by Auguste-Hilaire Léveillé. Its headquarters also moved to 8-11 galerie du Théâtre-Français. Music remained dominant both in its editorial content and its visual presentation - that content was entrusted to the librettist Paul Milliet. Its headquarters moved again, this time to 24 boulevard des Capucines, linked with 'La Librairie nouvelle.

A new graphic concept began around 1909, this time from Géo Dorival. In the interim it had started to include reproduced photographs interspersed with original drawings by artists including Lucien Barbut, Louis Lucien Faure-Dujarric, Georges Sauvage and Paul-Charles Delaroche. It moved again, to 48 rue Cambon, and the price rose to 50 centimes. The last issue was in the first week of August 1914 upon the outbreak of the First World War.
