= Novel of manners =

Novel that re-creates a social world

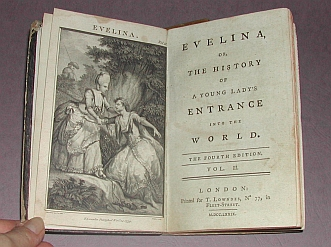
The Novel of Manners: Evelina: Or the History of a Young Lady's Entrance into the World (1779), by Frances Burney.

The novel of manners is a work of fiction that re-creates a social world, conveying with detailed observation the complex of customs, values, and mores of a stratified society. The behavioural conventions (manners) of the society dominate the plot of the story, and characters are differentiated by the degree to which they meet or fail to meet the uniform standard of ideal social behaviour as established by society.

The scope of a novel of manners can be particular, as in the works of Jane Austen, which deal with the domestic affairs of the landed gentry of England in the beginning of the 19th century, or the scope can be general, as in the works of Honoré de Balzac, which portray the social conventions of 19th-century France with stories about the public sphere and the private sphere of French life in Paris, the provinces, and the military. Notable English-language novelists of manners include Henry James, Evelyn Waugh, Jane Austen, Edith Wharton, and John Marquand.

== Background ==
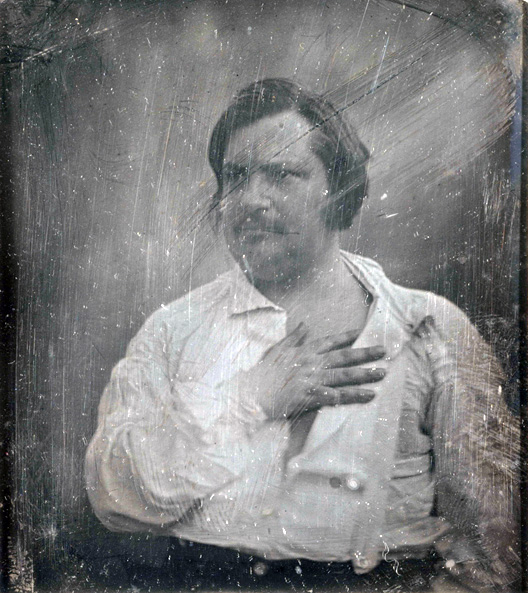
The French novelist Honoré de Balzac was a founder of literary realism, of which the novel of manners is a subgenre.

To realise upward social mobility in their societies, men and women learned etiquette in order to know how to get along with the people from whom they sought favour; an example of such instructions is the book Letters to His Son on the Art of Becoming a Man of the World and a Gentleman (1774), by Philip Stanhope, 4th Earl of Chesterfield. In consideration of being liked by the people with whom he keeps company, Chesterfield instructs his bastard son to engage with society by being a man of pleasing manner and demeanour, avoiding controversial subjects, speaking in a measured tone, and having a poised personal posture.

Many novels of manners, including Evelina: Or the History of a Young Lady's Entrance into the World (1779) by Frances Burney, take a sociological interest in the complex systems of etiquette and social hierarchy employed by the upper classes, especially those of Europe and North America. Others works in the genre, including the novels of Jane Austen, offer critical social commentary through the use of satire.

== Manners and Gothic fiction ==
As the creator of Gothic fiction and the author of The Castle of Otranto (1764), Horace Walpole noted the importance of manners for social advancement. Walpole's knowledge of the Earl of Chesterfield's emphasis upon manners in society influenced his fiction and that of other authors of Gothic novels.

As genres of fiction, the novel of manners and the Gothic novel overlapped in the language of manners, in stories wherein the social mores and personal manners are important factors in the thematic structure of the novel. In the Gothic novel, the difference is the presence of the supernatural as influencing the human events of the story, however, the coarseness of affect of some characters characterises the Gothic story as a horror story and thus a different conclusion. The conclusion of a Gothic novel does not always reinforce the morals of society, as does the novel of manners, as in the anticlimactic conclusion of Zofloya; or, The Moor: A Romance of the Fifteenth Century (1806) by Charlotte Dacre.

Another theory for the emergence and growth of the novel of manners is that the changes taking place in English society were eroding the class boundaries. Changes in the social hierarchy were taking place due to leaps in technology and the novel of manners was a way to comment upon challenges to the traditional class order. The different classes represented in the novels served to highlight how the different classes in society were supposed to behave in different settings. This includes public versus private, rural versus urban, and settings where there were particular dynamics between men and women.

== Notable works ==
Novels of manners in English include:

=== 18th century ===
- The Man of Feeling (1771) by Henry Mackenzie
- Evelina (1778) and Camilla (1796) by Frances Burney

=== 19th century ===
- Sense and Sensibility (1811), Pride and Prejudice (1813), Mansfield Park (1814), Emma (1816), and Persuasion (1818) by Jane Austen
- Vanity Fair: A Novel Without a Hero (1848) by William Makepeace Thackeray
- North and South (1855) and Wives and Daughters (1864) by Elizabeth Cleghorn Gaskell
- The Mill on the Floss (1860), Silas Marner (1861), and Middlemarch (1871–72) by George Eliot
- The Portrait of a Lady (1881) by Henry James

=== 20th century ===
- The House of Mirth (1905) and The Age of Innocence (1920) by Edith Wharton
- A Handful of Dust (1937) by Evelyn Waugh

=== 21st century ===
- The Line of Beauty (2004) by Alan Hollinghurst
- On Beauty (2005) by Zadie Smith
- Normal People (2018) by Sally Rooney

== See also ==
- Comedy of manners
- Literary realism
- L'Enfant à la balustrade
