= André Bellessort =

French writer (1866–1942)

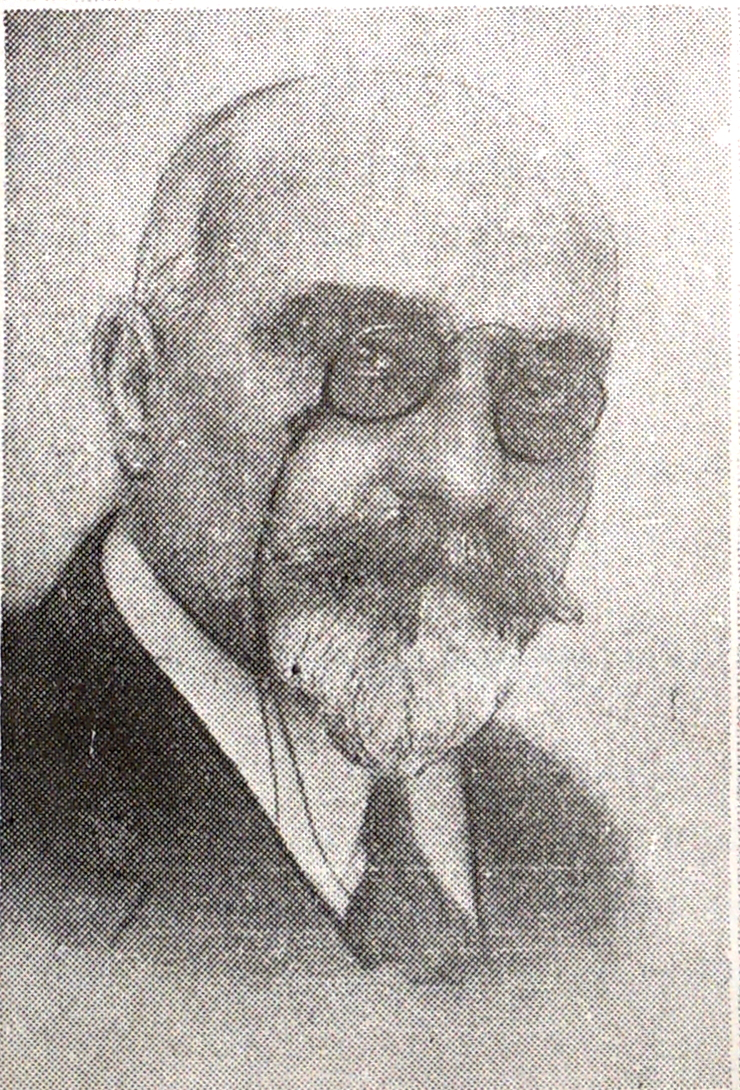
1928

André Bellessort (19 March 1866 in Laval, Mayenne – 22 January 1942 in Paris) was a French writer.

== Biography ==
Bellessort was not only a poet and essayist, but also a traveller who went to Chile, Bolivia, and Japan. He is known for his influence on his pupils as a teacher in hypokhâgne in the Lycée Louis-le-Grand, notably related in Robert Brasillach's memories, Notre avant-guerre.

He also prepared his translations for the Budé collection in class.
