= La Revue politique et littéraire =

La Revue politique et littéraire, commonly known as the Revue bleue, was a French centre-left political magazine published from 1871 to 1939. It was founded by Eugène Yung (1827–1887). The in-house nickname "revue bleue" was a reference to La Revue scientifique from the same publishers, a scientific magazine which was established 8 years earlier, known from its pink cover as the "revue rose". The headquarters was in Paris. The magazine was published bi-monthly and then monthly.

Émile Faguet was literary critic for the Revue bleue from 1892. Joseph Reinach wrote articles on Balkan politics. Other contributors included René Doumic, Ferdinand Brunetière, Charles Maurras, Léon Cahun, Louis Léger, René Guénon, Robert de Bonnières (Mémoires d’aujourd’hui, 1880), and Paul Eugène Louis Deschanel (La question du Tonkin, 1883).
