= Gender neutrality in languages with gendered third-person pronouns =

A third-person pronoun is a pronoun that refers to an entity other than the speaker or listener. Some languages with gender-specific pronouns, such as Slavic ones, have them as part of a grammatical gender system, a system of agreement where most or all nouns have a value for this grammatical category. A few languages with gender-specific pronouns, such as English, Afrikaans, Defaka, Khmu, Malayalam, Tamil, and Yazgulyam, lack grammatical gender; in such languages, gender usually adheres to "natural gender", which is often based on biological sex. Other languages, including most Austronesian languages, lack gender distinctions in personal pronouns entirely, as well as any system of grammatical gender.

In languages with pronominal gender, problems of usage may arise in contexts where a person of unspecified or unknown social gender is being referred to but commonly available pronouns are gender-specific. Different solutions to this issue have been proposed and used in various languages.

== Overview of grammar patterns in languages ==
=== No gender distinctions in personal pronouns ===
Many languages of the world (including most Austronesian languages, many East Asian languages, the Quechuan languages, and the Uralic languages) do not have gender distinctions in personal pronouns, just as most of them lack any system of grammatical gender. In others, such as many of the Niger–Congo languages, there is a system of grammatical gender (or noun classes), but the divisions are based on classifications other than sex, such as animacy, rationality, or countability. In Swahili, for example, the independent third person pronoun yeye 'she/he' can be used to refer to a female or male being. What matters in this case is that the referent belongs to the animate class (i.e humans or non-human animals) as opposed to an inanimate class. Since pronouns do not distinguish the social gender of the referent, they are considered neutral in this kind of system.

=== Grammatical gender ===
In other languages – including most Indo-European and Afro-Asiatic languages – third-person personal pronouns (at least those used to refer to people) intrinsically distinguish male from female. This feature commonly co-exists with a full system of grammatical gender, where all nouns are assigned to classes such as masculine, feminine and neuter.

In languages with grammatical gender, even pronouns which are semantically gender-neutral may be required to take a gender for such purposes as grammatical agreement. Thus in French, for example, the first- and second-person personal pronouns may behave as either masculine or feminine depending on the sex of the referent; and indefinite pronouns such as quelqu'un ('someone') and personne ('no one') are treated conventionally as masculine, even though personne as a noun ('person') is only feminine regardless of the sex of the referent. (See Grammatical gender § On pronouns.) There are both direct and indirect options for nonbinary referents, although the use of some forms is contested.

Example of agreement in a language with grammatical gender

(1) Les tomates, elles sont encore vertes.      Formal French
    'The tomatoes, they are still green.' FP,
     (Lambrecht 1981:40, cited by Gelderen, 2022, p. 33)

(2) C'est que chacun, il a sa manière de ...   Swiss spoken French
    'Everyone has his own way of ...'
    (Fronseca-Greber 2000:338, cited by Gelderen, 2022, p. 33)

=== Gender distinctions only in third-person pronouns ===
A grammatical gender system can erode as observed in languages such as Odia (formerly Oriya), English and Persian. In English, a general system of noun gender has been lost, but gender distinctions are preserved in the third-person singular pronouns. This means that the relation between pronouns and nouns is no longer syntactically motivated in the system at large. Instead, the choice of anaphoric pronouns is controlled by referential gender or social gender.

Example of agreement in English

(3) Maryi described Billj to herselfi.

(4) Johnj came in and hej was wearing a hat.

=== Issues concerning gender and pronoun usage ===
Issues concerning gender and pronoun usage commonly arise in situations where it is necessary to choose between gender-specific pronouns, even though the sex of the person or persons being referred to is not known, not specified, or (for plurals) mixed. In English and many other languages, the masculine form has sometimes served as the default or unmarked form; that is, masculine pronouns have been used in cases where the referent or referents are not known to be (all) female. This collective masculine is also the case in ancient languages, like Classical Greek and Biblical Hebrew and have influenced the modern forms. This leads to sentences such as (5a) in English, and (6a) in French.

Example of gender-neutral masculine: English

(5) a.  If anybody comes, tell him.      masculine him used to refer to a person of unknown sex

    b. *If anybody comes, tell her.      feminine her is not used to refer to a person of unknown sex

Example of collective masculine: French

(6) a. Vos amis sont arrivés — Ils étaient en avance. 
       'Your friends have arrived - they were early.'
        Note: plural masculine ils used if group has men and women

    b. Vos amies sont arrivées — Elles étaient en avance. 
      'Your friendsFEM have arrivedFEM - theyFEM were early.'
       Note: plural feminine elles used if group has only women;
             noun is feminine (amies), as is past participle (arrivées)

As early as 1795, dissatisfaction with the convention of the collective masculine led to calls for gender-neutral pronouns, and attempts to invent pronouns for this purpose date back to at least 1850, although the use of singular they as a natural gender-neutral pronoun in English has persisted since the 14th century.

== Gender-neutral pronouns in modern standard English ==
The English language has gender-specific personal pronouns in the third-person singular. The masculine pronoun is he (with the related forms him, his and himself); the feminine is she (with the related forms her, hers and herself); the neuter is it (with the related forms its and itself). The third-person plural they (and its related forms them, their, themselves) are gender-neutral and can also be used to refer to singular, personal antecedents, as in (7).

(7) Where a recipient of an allowance under section 4 absents themself from Canada,
    payment of the allowance shall ...[14]

Generally speaking, he refers to males, and she refers to females. When a person has adopted a persona of a different gender (such as when acting or performing in drag), pronouns with the gender of the persona are used. In gay slang, the gender of pronouns is sometimes reversed (gender transposition).

He and she are normally used for humans; use of it can be dehumanizing, and, more importantly, implies a lack of gender even if one is present, and is usually, thus, inappropriate. It is sometimes used to refer to a baby or a child in a generic sense as in response to the question What is it? when a baby has been born: -It's a girl/boy. However, when talking to parents of intersex babies, some doctors are advised to use your baby instead. It is often used for non-human animals of unknown sex, but he or she is frequently used for a non-human animal with a known sex. He or she are also for a non-human animal who is referred to by a proper name, as in (8) where Fido is understood to be the name of a dog. At least one grammar states that he or she is obligatory for animals referred to by a proper name.

(8) Fido adores his blanket.

The other English pronouns (the first- and second-person personal pronouns I, we, you, etc.; the third-person plural personal pronoun they; the indefinite pronouns one, someone, anyone, etc.; and others) do not make male–female gender distinctions; that is, they are gender-neutral. The only distinction made is between personal and non-personal reference (someone vs. something, anyone vs. anything, who vs. what, whoever vs. whatever, etc.).

She is sometimes used for named ships and countries; this may be considered old-fashioned and is in decline. In some local dialects and casual speech she and he are used for various objects and named vehicles (like a personal car). Animate objects like robots and voice assistants are often assumed to have a gender and sometimes have a name with a matching gender. (See Gender in English § Metaphorical gender.)

For people who are transgender, style guides and associations of journalists and health professionals advise use of the pronoun preferred or considered appropriate by the person in question. When dealing with clients or patients, health practitioners are advised to take note of the pronouns used by the individuals themselves, which may involve using different pronouns at different times. This is also extended to the name preferred by the person referred to. LGBTQ+ advocacy groups also advise using the pronouns and names preferred or considered appropriate by the person referred to. They further recommend avoiding gender confusion when referring to the background of transgender people, such as using a title or rank to avoid a gendered pronoun or name.

For English, there is no universal agreement on a gender-neutral third-person pronoun which could be used for a person whose gender is unknown or who is a non-binary gender identity; various alternatives are described in the following sections.

=== Singular they as a gender-neutral pronoun ===
Since at least the 14th century, they (including related forms such as them, their, theirs, themselves, and themself) has been used with a plural verb form to refer to a singular antecedent. This usage is known as the singular they, as it is equivalent to the corresponding singular form of the pronoun.

(9) There's not a man I meet but doth salute me
    As if I were their well-acquainted friend
    <(William Shakespeare, A Comedy of Errors, 1623)[30]
    instead of: As if I were his well-acquainted friend

This is the generalized usage in third person. To imply 'his' is incorrect.

(10) Every fool can do as they're bid.
     <(Jonathan Swift, Polite Conversation, 1738)[30]
     instead of: Every fool can do as he's bid.

(11) Both sisters were uncomfortable enough.
     Each felt for the other, and of course for themselves.
     <(Jane Austen, Pride and Prejudice, 1813)[30]
     instead of: Each felt for the other, and of course for herself.

Prescription against singular they has historically impacted more formal registers of writing. Conversely, to the present day, singular they continues to be attested in both speech and less formal registers of writing in British and American English. Recent corpus data suggest that English dialects in Hong Kong, India, and Singapore use this epicene less than British English. The Cambridge Grammar of the English Language and the Merriam-Webster Dictionary include the following examples among the possible uses of singular they, which they note is not universally adopted by all speakers.

(12) Anyone who arrives at the door can let themself in using this key.[33]

(13) I knew certain things about ... the person I was interviewing ...
     They had adopted their gender-neutral name a few years ago,
     when they began to consciously identify as nonbinary ...
     (Amy Harmon)[34]

While many speakers recognize the need for gender neutral pronouns, they nevertheless deem referential singular they, as in (13), ungrammatical or unfit for the job due to the ambiguity it can create in certain contexts. New pronouns such as ve (used in science fiction) and ze/hir have been proposed in order to avoid the perceived limitations of singular they. Currently, these new pronouns are only used by a small percentage of speakers while singular they remains the most widely selected option.

==== Antecedents for singular they ====
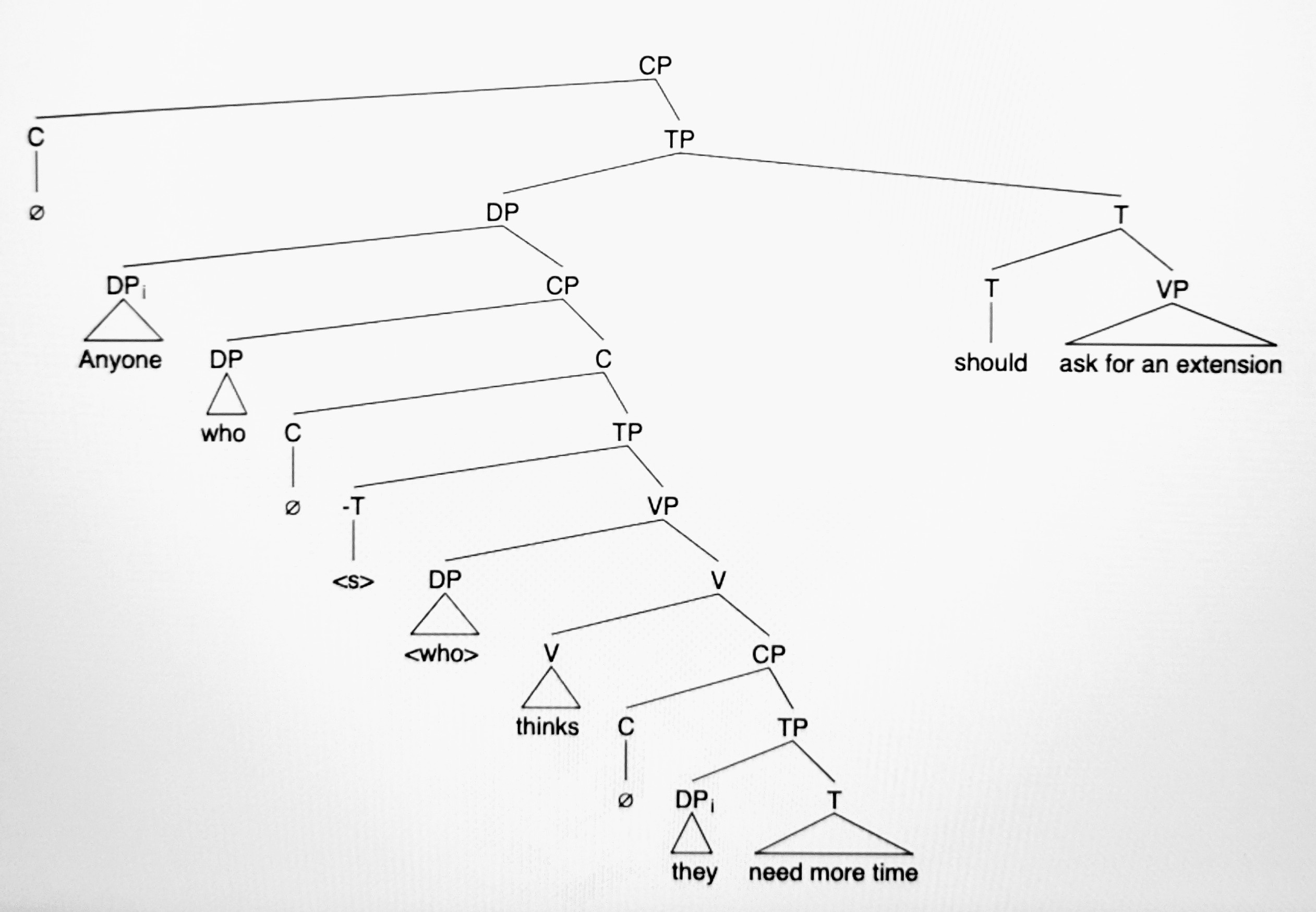
Syntax tree showing coreference in sentence (14) a

Generally speaking, there are three kinds of antecedents with which the singular they can be used.

- In (14), singular they occurs with a quantified singular antecedent or a singular antecedent of unknown gender.
- In (15), singular they occurs with a singular antecedent known to be nonbinary or ungendered.
- In (16), singular they occurs with a singular antecedent of any gender, with no restriction on description or name.

In examples (14–16), subscript_{i} indicates coreference; moreover, examples such as (15) and (16) are sometimes referred to as 'referential they'.

(14) a. Anyonei who thinks theyi need more time should ask for an extension.[38]

    b. The personi at the door left before I could see who theyi were.[38]

(15) a. Kellyi said theyi were leaving early.[38]

     b. The strongest studenti will present theiri paper next.[38]

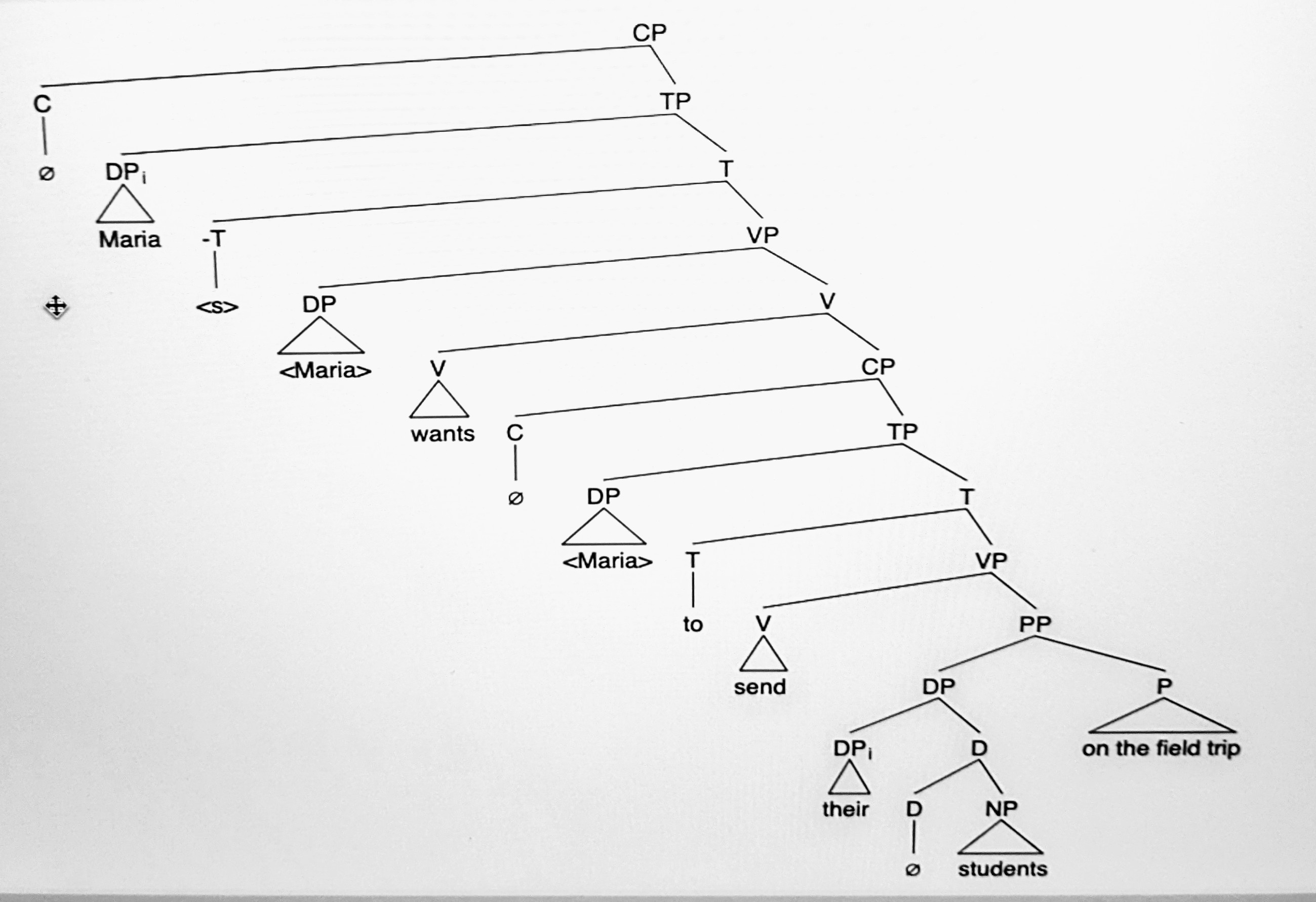
Syntax tree showing coreference in sentence (16) a

(16) a. Mariai wants to send theiri students on the field trip.[38]

     b. We heard from Arthuri that theyi needed time to think about the idea.[38]

     c. We asked [the first girl in line]i to introduce themself/themselvesi.[38]

     d. Your brotheri called to say theyi would be late.[38]

==== Speaker variation ====
In the twenty-first century, syntactic research differentiates three groups of English speakers which can be identified, based on their judgments about pronoun usage for (14), (15) and (16).

- Group A speakers judge only (14) to be acceptable. Such speakers reject "referential" singular when they know the referent's binary gender, which is taken to indicate that gender features are contrastive in their lexicons. For this group of speakers, usage of singular they in (14) is acceptable to because the quantified antecedent anyone and the definite description the person lack a gender specification.
- Group B speakers judge both (14) and (15) to be acceptable. For these speakers, gender is thought to still be contrastive in their lexicons; however, they have created special entries for individuals that use the singular they pronoun.
- Group C speakers judge (14), (15) and (16) to be acceptable. It has been proposed that gender is losing its featural contrast in these speakers' lexicons.

Speaker variation with singular they pronoun usage
Antecedent	Group A usage	Group B usage	Group C usage
Quantified, or gender is unknown, (14)	yes	yes	yes
Nonbinary or ungendered, (15)	no	yes	yes
Any gender, (16)	no	no	yes

A recent study by Kirby Conrod found these speaker groups to be correlated with age and gender identity. Relative to age, participants of all ages accepted the usage in (14), whereas younger participants rated usage of referential they in (15) and (16) higher than did their older counterparts. Relative to gender identity, non-binary and transgender participants rated referential they higher than did cisgender participants. Elsewhere, cisgender speakers with at least one trans or non-binary family member have also been found to rate all three cases as acceptable. Another study found a correlation between resistance to the second and third uses and prescriptivist attitudes about language.

Work by Keir Moulton and colleagues, published in 2020, has also found that the presence of a linguistic antecedent — which is the case for examples (14), (15), and (16) — significantly improves the acceptability judgments of singular they. In sentences with a linguistic antecedent, such as (17a), the use of singular they is judged to be equally acceptable whether or not the hearer knows the (binary) gender of the referent. In sentences where singular they is purely deictic and has no linguistic antecedent, such as (17b), the use of singular they is judged to be less acceptable than the use of a singular gendered pronoun (such as he or she) when the hearer knows the referent's (binary) gender. The authors suggest that the use of a gender-neutral antecedent (e.g. server or reporter) may signal the irrelevance of gender in the discourse context, making singular they more acceptable. Additionally, having a linguistic antecedent clarified that the speaker was referring to a singular antecedent, rather than a plural one. In the deictic case, without a linguistic antecedent, these signals were not overt, and the speakers' judgment depended more on their experience with the pronoun itself.

Type of antecedent affects acceptability of singular their (subscript _{i} denotes coreference)

(17) a. The reporteri said that theiri cellphone was recording the whole interview.
        Note: judged as more acceptable

     b. Theyi said that theiri cellphone was recording the whole interview. 
        Note: judged as less acceptable

Another study found an effect of social distance on speaker judgments of singular they use. Usage was judged to be more acceptable when the speaker was not personally close with the referent, compared to use for referents with whom the speaker was personally close. The authors suggested that, in the former case, the referent's gender may be less likely to be known or relevant.

=== Reference to males and females ===
==== Generic he ====
Forms of the pronoun he were used for both males and females during the Middle English and Modern English periods. Susanne Wagner observed that "There was rather an extended period of time in the history of the English language when the choice of a supposedly masculine personal pronoun (him) said nothing about the gender or sex of the referent." An early example of prescribing the use of he to refer to a person of unknown gender is Anne Fisher's 1745 grammar book A New Grammar. Older editions of Fowler also took this view. This usage continues to this day:

(18) a. The customer brought his purchases to the cashier for checkout.

     b. In a supermarket, a customer can buy anything he needs.

     c. When a customer argues, always agree with him.

This may be compared to usage of the word man for humans in general (although that was the original sense of the word "man" in the Germanic languages, much as the Latin word for "human in general", homo, came to mean "male human"—which was vir, in Latin—in most of the Romance languages).

(19) a. All men are created equal.[a]

     b. Man cannot live by bread alone.[b]

The use, in formal English, of he, him or his as a gender-neutral pronoun has traditionally been considered grammatically correct. For example, William Safire in his "On Language" column in The New York Times approved of the use of generic he, mentioning the mnemonic phrase "the male embraces the female". A reader replied with an example of use of the gender-neutral he, as in (20). Such examples point to the fact indiscriminate use of generic he leads to non-sensical violations of semantic gender agreement.

(20) "The average American needs the small routines of getting ready for work.
      As he shaves or blow-dries his hair or pulls on his panty-hose,
      he is easing himself by small stages into the demands of the day."
      (C. Badendyck, The New York Times (1985);[49] as quoted by Miller and Swift.[48])

The use of generic he has increasingly been a source of controversy, as it can be perceived as reflecting a positive bias towards men and a male-centric society, and a negative bias against women. In some contexts, the use of he, him or his as a gender-neutral pronoun may give a jarring or ridiculous impression:

(21) a. "... everyone will be able to decide for himself whether or not to have an abortion."
         (Albert Bleumenthal, N.Y. State Assembly (cited in Longman 1984,
          as quoted in Merriam-Webster's Concise Dictionary of English Usage[51]

     b. "... the ideal that every boy and girl should be so equipped
         that he shall not be handicapped in his struggle for social progress..."
         (C. C. Fries, American English Grammar (1940), quoted in Reader's Digest 1983;
          as cited in Merriam-Webster's Concise Dictionary of English Usage[51]

     c. "... She and Louis had a game—who could find the ugliest photograph of himself."
         (Joseph P. Lash, Eleanor and Franklin (1971), quoted in Reader's Digest 1983;
          as cited in Merriam-Webster's Concise Dictionary of English Usage)[51]

The use of generic he has also been seen as prejudicial by some, as in the following cases:

- The Massachusetts Medical Society effectively blocked membership of female physicians on the grounds that the society's by-laws used the pronoun he when referring to members.
- The Persons Case, the legal battle over whether Canadian women counted as legal persons eligible to sit in the Senate, partially turned on use of "he" to refer to a (generic) person qualified to be a senator. However, these stem from the ignorance of the basic principle that in English, words can have more than one meaning.

Avoidance of the generic he is seen by proponents of non-gendered writing as indicating that the gender-neutral he is in fact not gender-neutral since it "brings a male image to mind". The same would apply to the generic she, bringing a female image to mind. She has traditionally been used as a generic pronoun when making generalizations about people belonging to a group when most members of that group are assumed to be female:

(22) a. A secretary should keep her temper in check.

     b. A nurse must always be kind to her patients.

==== He or she, (s)he ====
To disambiguate contexts where a referent encompasses both males and females, periphrasis is used. Though cumbersome, this solution is attested with the full range of English pronouns, include the subject pronouns he or she (23), the object pronouns him or her (24), the possessive pronoun his or hers (25), and the reflective pronouns himself or herself (26). In writing, these periphrastic forms are sometimes abbreviated to he/she, (s)he, s/he, him/her, his/her, himself/herself and hers/his, but are not easily abbreviated in verbal communication. With the exception of (s)he and s/he, a writer does in principle have the choice of which pronoun to place first. However, usage indicates that the masculine pronouns is most often mentioned first.

(23) a. If any employee needs to take time off,
        s/he should contact the Personnel Department.[53]
  
     b. Talk to your doctor and see if s/he knows of any local groups.[54]

     c. Each employee must sign the register when she/he enters or leaves.[55]

     d. Read to children and let them participate from time to time by telling them what
        they think the author would add if she or he was present with them.[56]

(24) a. How often do you perform small acts of kindness for your partner
        (like making him or her coffee in the morning)?.[57]

     b. Clearly, no one in the entire United States simply meets someone,
        talks with him or her a while, and falls in love any more.[58]

(25) a. We must fight the tradition that forces the actor to accept poverty
        as a precondition of his or her profession.[56]

     b. Everyone will improve him/herself in his/her area ...[59]

(26) a. ... at the collegiate level the student must advocate for himself or herself.[60]

     b. ... no student, of any background, should be expected at the outset
        to recognize him or herself in it.[61]

     c.  Everyone will improve him/herself in his/her area ...[59]

Some observers, such as the linguist James McCawley, suggest that the use of periphrastic forms may promote stereotypes: "he and she [can foster] the standard sexual stereotypes [in that] if you say he or she, you imply that women aren't included unless they are specifically mentioned, and you make it easier to talk about cases where only one sex is included than where both are."

==== Alternation of she and he ====
Authors sometimes employ rubrics for selecting she or he such as:

- Use the gender of the primary author.
- Alternate between "she" and "he".
- Alternate by paragraph or chapter.
- Use she and he to make distinctions between two groups of people.

=== It as a gender-neutral pronoun ===
Old English had grammatical gender, and thus commonly used "it" for people, even where they were clearly female or male:

- cild (meaning 'child') had grammatical neuter gender, as did compound words formed from it, e.g. wæpnedcild 'male-child' and wifcild 'female-child'. All three were pronominalized by the neuter pronoun it (hit).
- wif (meaning "female", modern "wife") had grammatical neuter gender, and so were pronominalized by the neuter pronoun it "it". When wif was the non-head member of a compound — as with wifmann 'female-person', modern 'woman' — the gender of the compound was determined by the head of the compound, in this case mann, which had grammatical masculine gender, and so was pronominalized by the masculine pronoun he.

Over time, English gradually developed a system of natural gender (gender based on semantic meaning) which now holds sway in Modern English.

==== For human children ====
In Modern English, pronouns referring to adult humans are typically gendered: feminine she, masculine he. However, in some contexts, children may be referred to with the gender-neutral pronoun it. When not referring specifically to children, it is not generally applied to people, even in cases where their gender is unknown.

The 1985 edition of the Quirk et al. grammar observes that whereas he and she are used for entities treated as people (including anthropomorphized entities), the pronoun it is normally used for entities not regarded as persons. But the pronoun it can be used of children in some circumstances, for instance when the sex is indefinite or when the writer has no emotional connection to the child, as in a scientific context lsuch as (26). According to The Handbook of Non-Sexist Writing (1995), it is also sometimes the "obvious" choice for children. Examples given include (27a), and the more colloquial (27b). It may even be used when the child's sex is known: In the passage given in (27c), the characters refer to the boy-child at the center of the narrative as a he, but then the narrator refers to it as an it. In this case, the child has yet to be developed into a character that can communicate with the reader.

(27) a. A child learns to speak the language of its environment.
        (Quirk et al., A Comprehensive Grammar of the English Language (1985), p. 316–317, 342)
        
     b. To society, a baby's sex is second in importance to its health. 
        (Miller & Swift, The Handbook of Non-Sexist Writing (1995), p. 58)

     c. "He looks like nobody but himself," said Mrs. Owens, firmly.
         ... It was then that ... the child opened its eyes wide in wakefulness.
         It stared around it ...
       (Neil Gaiman, The Graveyard Book (2008), p. 25)

==== For non-human animals ====
The Quirk et al. 1985 grammar states that the use of gendered he or she is optional for non-human animals of known sex. It gives the following example, which illustrates the use of both the gender-neutral possessive its and the gendered possessive her to refer to a bird:

(28) The robin builds its nest in a well-chosen position ...
     and, after the eggs have hatched, the mother bird feeds her young there for several weeks ...
     (Quirk et al., A comprehensive grammar of the English language (1985), p. 316–317, 342)

=== One as a gender-neutral pronoun ===
Another gender-neutral pronoun that can be used to refer to people is the impersonal pronoun, one. This can be used in conjunction with the generic he according to the preference and style of the writer.

- Each student should save his questions until the end.
- One should save one's questions until the end.
- One should save his questions until the end.

In colloquial speech, generic you is often used instead of one:

- You should save your questions until the end.

=== Historical, regional, and proposed gender-neutral singular pronouns ===
Historically, there were two gender-neutral pronouns native to English dialects, ou and (h)a. According to Dennis Baron's Grammar and Gender:

In 1789, William H. Marshall records the existence of a dialectal English epicene pronoun, singular "ou": "'Ou will' expresses either he will, she will, or it will." Marshall traces "ou" to Middle English epicene "a", used by the 14th century English writer John of Trevisa, and both the OED and Wright's English Dialect Dictionary confirm the use of "a" for he, she, it, they, and even I. This "a" is a reduced form of the Anglo-Saxon he = "he" and heo = "she".

Relics of these gender-neutral terms survive in some British dialects of Modern English — for example hoo for 'she', in Yorkshire — and sometimes a pronoun of one gender can be applied to a human or non-human animal of the opposite gender.

- hoo is also sometimes used in the West Midlands and south-west England as a common gender pronoun
- er can be used in place of either he or she in some West Country dialects, although only in weak (unstressed) positions such as in tag questions
- hye could refer to either he or she in Essex in the south-east of England, in the Middle English period
- yo: a 2007 paper reports that in some schools in the city of Baltimore, yo has come to be used as a gender-neutral pronoun.

Since at least the 19th century, numerous proposals for the use of other non-standard gender-neutral pronouns have been introduced:

- e, (es, em) is the oldest recorded English gender-neutral (ungendered) pronoun with declension, coined by Francis Augustus Brewster in 1841. E, es, em, and emself were also proposed by James Rogers in 1890. The aim was to provide a neutral, ungendered pronoun because the link of pronouns to sex was considered a major flaw. Donald G. MacKay (1980) experimented with the use of e, es, em, and eself.
- thon, proposed by Charles Crozat Converse in 1884 — other sources date its coinage to 1858 — received the greatest mainstream acceptance. A contraction of 'that one', thon was listed in Funk and Wagnall's Standard Dictionary from 1898 through to 1964, and was also included in Webster's Second New International Dictionary (but not in its the first and third editions).
- co was coined by the feminist writer Mary Orovan in 1970. It is in common usage in intentional communities of the Federation of Egalitarian Communities, appearing in the bylaws of several of these communities. In addition to using co when the gender of the antecedent is unknown or indeterminate, some use co as gender-blind language, where co replaces gendered pronouns.
- ze has several variants (see table below) and is used to meet the needs of unspecified gender situations and transgender persons. Kate Bornstein, an American transgender author, uses the pronoun forms ze and hir in the 1996 book Nearly Roadkill: An Infobahn Erotic Adventure. Jeffrey A. Carver, an American science fiction writer, used the pronoun hir in the 1989 novel From a Changeling Star for a different-gendered nonhuman.

=== Table of standard and non-standard third-person singular pronouns ===
	Source	Nominative (subject)	Oblique (object)	Independent genitive (possessive)	Dependent genitive (possessive)	Reflexive
Standard pronoun usage
he		he is laughing	I called him	his eyes gleam	that is his	he likes himself
she		she is laughing	I called her	her eyes gleam	that is hers	she likes herself
they (singular)		they are laughing	I called them	their eyes gleam	that is theirs	they like themself
it		it is laughing	I called it	its eyes gleam	that is its	it likes itself
one		one is laughing	I called one	one's eyes gleam	that is one's	one likes oneself
they (plural)		they are laughing	I called them	their eyes gleam	that is theirs	they like themselves
'em		–	I called 'em	–	–	–
Orthographic conventions for gender-neutral pronouns
she/he		she/he is laughing	I called him/her	her/his eyes gleam	that is his/hers	she/he likes her/himself
s/he		s/he is laughing	I called h/er	h/er eyes gleam	that is h/ers	s/he likes h/erself
Artificial and proposed epicene pronouns
e	Brewster, 1841	e is laughing	I called em	es eyes gleam	that is es	e likes emself
thon	Converse, 1884	thon is laughing	I called thon	thons eyes gleam	that is thons	thon likes thonself
e	Rogers, 1890	e is laughing	I called em	es eyes gleam	that is es	e likes emself
ae	Lindsay, 1920	ae is laughing	I called aer	aer eyes gleam	that is aers	ae likes aerself
tey	Miller and Swift, 1971	tey is laughing	I called tem	ter eyes gleam	that is ters	tey likes temself
xe	Rickter, c. 1973	xe is laughing	I called xem/xim	xyr/xis eyes gleam	that is xyrs/xis	xe likes xemself/ximself
te	Farrell, 1974	te is laughing	I called tir	tes eyes gleam	that is tes	te likes tirself
ey	Elverson, 1975	ey is laughing	I called em	eir eyes gleam	that is eirs	ey likes emself
per	Piercy, 1979	per is laughing	I called per	pers eyes gleam	that is pers	per likes perself
ve	Hulme	ve is laughing	I called ver	vis eyes gleam	that is vis	ve likes verself
hu	Newborn, 1982	hu is laughing	I called hum	hus eyes gleam	that is hus	hu likes humself
E	Spivak, 1983	e is laughing	I called em	eir eyes gleam	that is eirs	e likes emself
hes	Ching Hai, 1989	hes is laughing	I called hirm	hiers eyes gleam	that is hiers	hes likes hirmself
ze, mer	Creel, 1997	ze is laughing	I called mer	zer eyes gleam	that is zers	ze likes zemself
ze, hir	Bornstein, 1998	ze is laughing	I called hir	hir eyes gleam	that is hirs	ze likes hirself
sie, hir	Hyde, 2001	sie is laughing	I called hir	hir eyes gleam	that is hirs	sie likes hirself
sey, seir, sem	Rogerson, 2013	sey is laughing	I called sem	seir eyes gleam	that is seirs	sey likes semself
fae		fae is laughing	I called faer	faer eyes gleam	that is faers	fae likes faerself
eh	Steinbach, 2018	eh is laughing	I called ehm	ehs eyes gleam	that is ehs	eh likes ehmself
thay	Gori Suture, 2022	thay are laughing	I called thym	thayr eyes gleam	that is thayrs	thay like thymself

== Emergence of gender-neutral pronouns in languages with grammatical gender ==
=== French iel ===
In 2021, the French dictionary Le Petit Robert de la Langue Française added a third-person gender neutral pronoun to its lexicon: iel (plural iels), though there is no discussion in its entry regarding how the language, which uses a grammatical gender system in which every content word has a gender, should proceed with agreement.

As reported in The New York Times, this merger of the third person masculine pronoun il 'he' and the third person feminine pronoun elle 'she' is used to refer to a person of any gender. It has caused controversy amongst both linguists and politicians who claim that the French language cannot be manipulated. The dictionary takes the position that it is observing how the French language evolves, adding it as a point of reference. However, the Larousse (a prominent encyclopedia of the French language) disagrees, calling iel a "pseudo pronoun".

=== Polish onu and ono ===
The Polish language does not have officially recognized and standardized gender-neutral pronoun. The most popular neopronoun, created to address nonbinary people, is onu. It was originally created by science fiction and fantasy writer Jacek Dukaj, for his 2004 book Perfect Imperfection. From the surname of the author, this, and similar neopronouns created by him, are referred to as dukaisms (dukaizmy), and after term coined by him, the post-gender pronouns (zaimki postpłciowe).

Some nonbinary Polish-speakers also use ono, which corresponds to the English it. The use of ono as a gender-neutral pronoun was recommended in a grammar book in 1823.

Pronoun onu
	Singular	Plural
nominative	onu	ony
genitive	jenu / nu / nienu	ich / ich / nich
dative	wu	im
accusative	nu	ni
instrumental	num	nimi
locative	num	nich

Suffixes corresponding to onu
	Singular	Plural
first person	-um	–ałuśmy
second person	–uś	–ałuście
third person	–u	–ły
adjectives	–u	-y

=== Swedish hen ===
The Swedish language has a four-gender distinction for definite singular third-person pronouns:

- masculine singular han 'he'
- feminine singular hon 'she'
- common singular den 'it'
- neuter singular det 'it'

The indefinite/impersonal third person is gender-neutral, as is the plural third person:

- plural third person de 'they'
- man 'someone'

As for first-person and second-person pronouns, they are gender-neutral in both the singular and plural

- first person: singular jag; plural vi
- second-person: singular du; plural ni

On nouns, the neuter gender is marked by the definite singular suffixal article -t, whereas common gender is marked with the suffix with -n. The same distinction applies to the indefinite adjectival singular forms. For people and animals with specified gender, the masculine or feminine pronouns are used, but the nouns still take either neutral or common articles. There is no gender distinction in the plural.

In Swedish, the word hen was introduced generally in the 2000s as a complement to the gender-specific hon ("she") and han ("he"). It can be used when the gender of a person is not known or when it is not desirable to specify them as either a "she" or "he". The word was proposed by Rolf Dunås in 1966 and could be used occasionally, like in a guideline from the Swedish building council from 1980, authored by Rolf Reimers. Its origin may have been a combination of han and hon.

It was proposed again in 1994, with reference to the Finnish hän, similarly pronounced, a personal pronoun that is gender-neutral, since Finnish completely lacks grammatical gender. In 2009 it was included in Nationalencyklopedin. However, it did not receive widespread recognition until around 2010, when it began to be used in some texts, and provoked some media debates and controversy, but is included since 2015 in Svenska Akademiens ordlista, the most authoritative spelling dictionary of the Swedish language, by the Swedish Academy.

As of 2016, Swedish manuals of style treat hen as a neologism. Major newspapers like Dagens Nyheter have recommended against its usage, though some journalists still use it. The Swedish Language Council has not issued any general recommendations against the use of hen, but advises against the use of the object form henom ("her/him"); it instead recommends using hen as both the subject and object form. Hen has two basic usages: as a way to avoid a stated preference to either gender; or as a way of referring to individuals who are transgender, who prefer to identify themselves as belonging to a third gender or who reject the division of male/female gender roles on ideological grounds. Its entry will cover two definitions: as a reference to an individual's belonging to a third gender, or where the sex is not specified.

Traditionally, Swedish offers other ways of avoiding using gender-specific pronouns; e.g., "vederbörande" ("the referred person") and "man" ("one", as in "Man borde ..."/"One should ...") with its objective form "en" or alternatively "en" as both subjective and objective since "man"/"one" sounds the same as "man"/"male adult" although they are discernible through syntax. "Denna/Denne" ("this one or she/he") may refer to a non-gender-specific referent already or soon-to-be mentioned ("Vederbörande kan, om denne så vill, ..."/"The referent may, if he wishes, ..."). Because "denne" is objectively masculine, the use of the word to refer to anyone irrespective of gender is not recommended. One method is rewriting into the plural, as Swedish – like English – has only gender-neutral pronouns in the plural. Another method is writing the pronoun in the referent's grammatical gender ("Barnet får om det vill."/"The child is allowed to, if it wants to." The word "barn"/child is grammatically neuter, thus the use of the third-person neuter pronoun "det"); some nouns retain their traditional pronouns, e.g., "man"/"man" uses "han"/"he", and "kvinna"/"woman" uses "hon"/"she". While grammatically correct, using "den/det" to refer to human beings may sound as if the speaker regards the referenced human beings as objects, so "han"/"hon" is preferred, for example about children or work titles such as "föraren" ("driver") or "rörmokaren" ("plumber").

=== Norwegian hen ===
As a continuation of earlier discussions along the same lines as well as the continuing uptake, the Language Council of Norway proposes the gender-neutral pronoun hen (from Swedish hen; compare Finnish hän) to be recognised officially.

Previously, the gender-neutral pronoun hin has been proposed to fill the gap between the third person pronouns hun ('she') and han ('he'). However, the usage of hin has not widely embraced, as it is rarely used, and even then only by limited special interest groups. A reason for the marginal interest in a neuter gender word is the constructed nature of the word, together with the fact that the word is homonymous with several older words both in official language and dialectal speech, such as hin ('the other') and hinsides ('beyond'). One can also use man or en or den (en means 'one'). These three are considered impersonal.

Amongst LGBT interest groups the word hen is now in use after the Swedish implementation in 2010.

=== Arabic ===
English-language neopronouns are being translated into Arabic, such as "ze" (Arabic: زي). Another neopronoun is "huomin" (Arabic: همنّ) a unified pronoun, used in case the gender of the person being spoken to or about is unknown or as a singular pronoun for non-binary people, akin to a singular "they".

=== German ===
Dey, one of many German neopronouns, written on a sticky note in Cologne.

While the German language has the gender-neutral pronoun es, it is considered dehumanizing by most German-speaking nonbinary people. As there is no other largely agreed-upon neutral pronoun in German, it is common for German-speaking nonbinary people to use neopronouns.

Illi Anna Heger created the gender-neutral German neopronoun sier in 2008 by combining sie and er, the feminine and masculine pronouns. Heger later coined the pronoun xier (German pronunciation: [ksiːɐ]) or /ziːɐ/) in 2012, as sier led to too much confusion. Another example of a neopronoun in German is dey/deren, influenced by English they. The English they is also used as a neopronoun in German.

They/them, xier, sier, and dey/deren are the most common used neutral neopronouns in German. Other less common German neopronouns include hen, xe, ey, lua, ens, vii, and mer.

== Emergence of gendered pronouns in languages without grammatical gender ==
=== Mandarin ===
==== Lack of gender contrasts in spoken language ====
Traditionally, the third person pronoun in Mandarin is gender-neutral. In spoken standard Mandarin, there is no gender distinction in personal pronouns: tā can mean 'he' or 'she' (or even 'it' for non-human objects). Although it is claimed that when the antecedent of the spoken pronoun tā is unclear, native speakers assume it is a male person, no evidence is given to support this claim. Many studies instead demonstrate the opposite: Mandarin speakers do not differentiate pronoun genders in the composition of the preverbal message that guides grammatical encoding during language production. Even proficient bilingual Mandarin-English learners do not process gender information in the conceptualizer. As a result, Mandarin speakers often mix up the gendered pronouns of European languages in speech. Even if they seldom make other types of errors, native Mandarin speakers can make such pronoun errors when speaking in English. This is even the case after they have been living in an immersive environment and after having attained a relatively high English level.

==== Emergence of gender contrasts via orthography ====
Although spoken Mandarin remains ungendered, a specific written form for 'she' (她 tā) was created in the early twentieth century under the influence of European languages. In today's written Chinese, the same sound is written with different characters: 他 (tā) for 'he', 她 (tā) for 'she' and 它 (tā) for 'it'. However, such distinction did not exist before the late 1910s. There was only 他 (tā) as a general third person pronoun (he/she/it'), which did not specify gender or humanness.

In 1917, the influential poet and linguist Liu Bannong borrowed the Old Chinese graph 她 (tā, with the radical nǚ 女 which means 'female') into the written language to specifically represent 'she'. As a result, the old character 他 (tā), which previously could also refer to females, has become sometimes restricted to meaning 'he' only in written texts. The character 他 has the radical rén (人) with means 'human', which also shows it originally was a generic term for people in general instead of a term for males, which should take the radical for male, nán (男), like other Chinese characters that represent specifically male concepts.

The creation of gendered pronouns in Chinese orthography was part of the May Fourth Movement to modernize Chinese culture, and specifically an attempt to assert sameness between Chinese and European languages, which generally have gendered pronouns. The leaders of the movement also coined other characters, such as 它 for objects, 牠 (radical: niú 牛, "cow") for animals, and 祂 (radical: shì 示, 'spirit') for gods. Their pronunciations were all tā. The latter two have fallen out of use in mainland China.

Liu and other writers of that period tried to popularize a different pronunciation for the feminine pronoun, including yi from the Wu dialect and tuo from a literary reading, but these efforts failed, and all forms of the third-person pronoun retain identical pronunciation. (This situation of identical pronunciation with split characters is present not only in Mandarin but also in many other varieties of Chinese.)

The Cantonese third-person-singular pronoun is keui^{5} (佢), and may refer to people of any gender. For a specifically female pronoun, some writers replace the person radical rén (亻) with the female radical nǚ (女), forming the character keui^{5} (姖). However, this analogous variation to tā is neither widely accepted in standard written Cantonese nor grammatically or semantically required. Moreover, while the character keui^{5} (佢) has no meaning in classical Chinese, the character keui^{5} (姖) has a separate meaning unrelated to its dialectic use in standard or classical Chinese.

As of 2013, there is a recent trend on the Internet for people to write "TA" in Latin script, derived from the pinyin romanization of Chinese, as a gender-neutral pronoun.

For second-person pronouns, 你 (nǐ) is used for both genders. In addition, the character 妳 (nǐ) has sometimes been used as a female second-person pronoun in Taiwan and Hong Kong.

=== Japanese ===
==== Emergence of gendered third-person forms ====
Pure personal pronouns do not exist in traditional Japanese, as pronouns are generally dropped. In addition, reference to a person is using their name with a suffix such as the gender-neutral san added to it. For example:

'She (Ms. Saitō) came' would be 斎藤さんが来ました (Saitō-san ga kimashita).

In modern Japanese, kare (彼) is the male and kanojo (彼女) the female third-person pronouns. Historically, kare was a word in the demonstrative paradigm (i.e., a system involving demonstrative prefixes, ko-, so-, a- (historical: ka-), and do-), used to point to an object that is physically far but psychologically near. The feminine counterpart kanojo, on the other hand, is a combination of kano (adnominal (rentaishi) version of ka-) and jo ('woman'), coined for the translation of its Western equivalents. It was not until the Meiji period that kare and kanojo were commonly used as the masculine and feminine pronoun in the same way as their Western equivalents. Although their usage as the Western equivalent pronouns tends to be infrequent—because pronouns tend to be dropped—kare-shi and kanojo are commonly used today to mean 'boyfriend' and 'girlfriend' respectively.

==== Emergence of gendered first-person forms ====
First-person pronouns, ore, boku, and atashi, while not explicitly carrying gender, can strongly imply gender based on inherent levels of politeness or formality as well as hierarchical connotations. While boku and ore are traditionally characterized as masculine pronouns, atashi is characterized as feminine. In addition, of the two masculine-leaning pronouns, boku is considered to be less masculine than ore and often connote a softer form of masculinity. When wishing to connote a sense of authority and confidence to their interlocutors, male speakers tend to use the first-person form ore.

== See also ==
- Epicenity
- Gender marking in job titles
- Gender neutrality in genderless languages
- Gender neutrality in languages with grammatical gender
- Generic antecedent
- Pronoun game
- Feminist language reform
- LGBT linguistics

=== Specific languages ===
- Gender neutrality in English
- Gender-neutral pronouns in Esperanto
- Gender neutrality in Spanish
- Gender neutrality in Portuguese
