= ONU =

ONU may refer to:

== People ==
- Lady Ōnu (died 724), Japanese noblewoman
- Onu (surname)

== Organizations ==
- United Nations in other languages, e.g. French Organisation des Nations Unies, Spanish Organización de las Naciones Unidas and Portuguese Organização das Nações Unidas
- Olivet Nazarene University
- Ohio Northern University
- Organizacion de Narcotraficantes Unidos, a Puerto Rican criminal organization
- Odesa University, (abbr. ONU), Ukraine

== Other uses ==
- Onu (pronoun), Polish neopronoun
- Optical Network Unit, the IEEE term for Optical Network Terminal
- Order of Nunavut, civilian honor in Canada
- Unua language (ISO 639: onu), Austronesian language of Vanuatu
