= Polish Council =

Polish Council may refer to:

- Polish Council of State, a collective head of state
- Polish Language Council, the official language regulating organ of the Polish language
