= Onu (pronoun) =

Proposed gender-neutral Polish pronoun

Onu (Polish: [ˈɔ.nu]) is a neopronoun in the Polish language intended as a gender-neutral pronoun, and an alternative to the gender-specific pronouns on ("he"), and ona ("she"). It is not officially accepted by the Polish Language Council.

== History ==
The Polish language does not have a personal gender-neutral pronoun recognized by the Polish Language Council. The most popular neopronoun, created to address nonbinary people, is onu. It was originally coined by science fiction and fantasy writer Jacek Dukaj, for his 2004 book Perfect Imperfection. From the surname of the author, this, and similar neopronouns created by him, are referred to as dukaisms, and after a term coined by him, also known as the "post-gender pronouns" (Polish: zaimki postpłciowe).

== Use ==
While "ono" is a neuter Polish pronoun typically used for animals and objects, indicating inanimacy, "onu" serves as a more specific option for non-binary people, which varies among individuals, with some opting for male, female, or neutral pronouns depending on the context and their personal preferences. It's also about adaptation of language to accommodate non-binary identities, where "onu" is part of a set of pronouns that may be used to refer to individuals who do not identify strictly as male or female. This is part of a broader discussion on how Polish, being a heavily gendered language, presents challenges for non-binary speakers who seek to express their identities without conforming to traditional masculine or feminine forms.

The use of "u" forms, inspired by the writing of Polish science-fiction writer Jacek Dukaj, and how these forms, including "onu," are part of ongoing efforts to create inclusive language options for non-binary individuals in Polish.

== Declension ==
Pronoun
	Singular	Plural
nominative	onu	ony
genitive	jenu / nu / nienu	ich / ich / nich
dative	wu	im
accusative	nu	ni
instrumental	num	nimi
locative	num	nich

As past tense suffix in verbs
	Singular	Plural
first person	-um	–ałuśmy
second person	–uś	–ałuście
third person	–u	–ły
adjectives	–u	–y

== See also ==
- Gender neutrality in languages with gendered third-person pronouns
