= European Council (disambiguation) =

The European Council is a meeting of the heads of state or government of the European Union.

It should not be confused with the Council of the European Union and the Council of Europe.

European Council may also refer to:

In politics:

- European Council on Foreign Relations, a neutral and independent international association
- European Research Council, a proposed funding body for science in the European Union

In other fields:

- European Article Numbering-Uniform Code Council, a supply chain standards family name
- European Council for Fatwa and Research, a Dublin-based private foundation
- European Council of International Schools, an association of international schools founded in 1965
- European Council on Refugees and Exiles, a pan-European network of refugee-assisting non-governmental organisations
- European Covered Bond Council, a joint organization of corporations in the European covered bond market to represent the industry
- European Cricket Council, an international body which oversees cricket in European countries
- European Language Council, a permanent association whose main aim is the improvement of knowledge of languages and cultures
- European Resuscitation Council, the European Interdisciplinary Council for Resuscitation Medicine and Emergency Medical Care

== See also ==
- EU Council (disambiguation)
