= Mademoiselle Cloque =

French novel of manners by René Boylesve

Miss Cloque
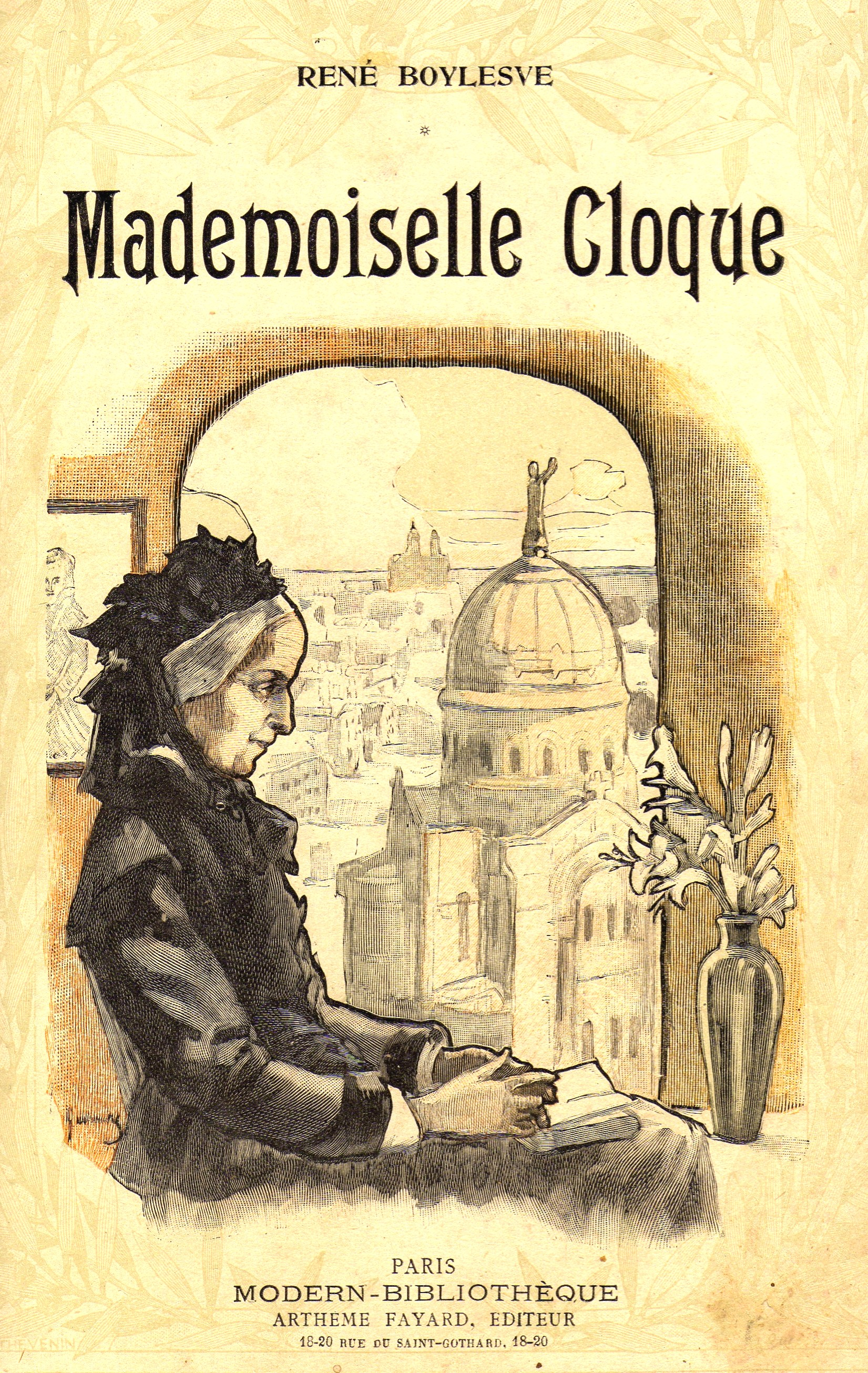
- Author: René Boylesve
- Original title: Mademoiselle Cloque
- Language: French
- Genre: Moeurs Novel
- Publication date: 1899
- Publication place: France
- Pages: 416
- Preceded by: Le Parfum des îles Borromées (1898)
- Followed by: La Becquée (1901)

Mademoiselle Cloque (French pronunciation: [madmwazɛl klɔk], Miss Cloque) is a French novel of manners by René Boylesve published in 1899.

The fifth novel of René Boylesve, tells against the backdrop of a religious quarrel in Tours in the 1880s, the last three years of the life of an idealistic and chivalrous old lady, who ardently wishes the reconstruction of a large basilica dedicated to Saint Martin of Tours. Supporting her principles, she goes so far as to refuse her niece a beautiful marriage with the son of a supporter of the opposing cause, who campaigns for the building of a modest church; However, this last option ends up prevailing at the end of clashes where politics, religion and particular interests are intimately mixed.

Taking as its argument the "war of the basilicas", a real episode in the history of Tours, and therefore fitting more secondarily in the Moeurs historical novel, the story is above all a study of morals on the part of the bourgeois and religious society of Tours in the 19th century as well as a portrait gallery. It traces the lost battle of idealism against realism, a recurring theme for the author.

== Summary ==
In the 1880s, the people of Tour were torn over the advisability of rebuilding a large basilica to the glory of Saint Martin or building a modest church above his recently rediscovered tomb.

Mademoiselle Cloque, 70 years old at the start of the novel and still single, a fervent “basilician”, (Note: Boylesve uses the term "basilican", in noun or adjective form, to designate the supporters of the reconstruction of a large basilica) divides her time between discussions with her servant Mariette and games of cards or checkers with the old Marquis d'Aubrebie, a neighbor and atheist friends with whom arguments are continuous. She lives in the memory of her interview with the Viscount of Chateaubriand, whom she met when she was a young girl, but above all, she devotes a large part of her energy to the project of rebuilding a sumptuous basilica. To do this, she does not hesitate to sacrifice the happiness of her niece Geneviève, an orphan for whom she is guardian and who should have married the rich son of a local notable. The latter is unfortunately won over to the cause of the supporters of a modest church, which makes marriage inconceivable in the eyes of Miss Cloque.

At one time director of the Saint-Martin workshop, she lost this title for a blunder that she was allowed to commit. His friends, taking this pretext and feeling that their cause no longer had the favor of the aediles or even the archbishop, one after the other abandoned the Basilican party and the old lady, except for a handful of irreducible like Mr Houblon. Miss Cloque, for her part, far from the businesses of her time, refuses any compromise and perseveres in her ideal. She lost her fight because only a “Republican chalet” (Note: The expression "republican chalet" refers, in the novel as in reality, to the majority political opinion in the municipal council of Tours, which approved its construction, as well as to the reduced size of the new church which, during its consecration, is not even completed) was finally built. Geneviève marries a notary from La Celle-Saint-Avant, a small town on the borders of the department and her former fiancé marries one of her friends, with lighter morals, but whose family's political opinions are more in line with hers. Miss Cloque dies at the age of 73, devastated by what she wrongly believes to be a betrayal on the part of her niece but above all undermined by grief and bitterness.

== Main characters ==
- Miss Cloque: heroine of the novel, 70 years old, single;
- Geneviève: niece of Miss Cloque;
- Second lieutenant Marie-Joseph de Grenaille-Montcontour: ex-future husband of Geneviève;
- Miss Jouffroy: two elderly sisters, friends than adversaries of Miss Cloque, “weathervanes” according to Boylesve;
- The Marquis d'Aubrebie: neighbor and friend of Miss Cloque;
- Sir Houblon: organist at Saint-Martin and fierce basilician;
- Loupaing: anticlerical, plumber and neighbor of Miss Cloque.

== Themes and characters of the novel ==
The general plot of the novel could be summarized as follows: "Because Miss Cloque and the Count of Grenaille-Montcontour do not agree on the dimensions of a basilica under construction, the niece of one will not marry the son of the other!".

=== Miss Cloque: idealist to the point of cruelty ===
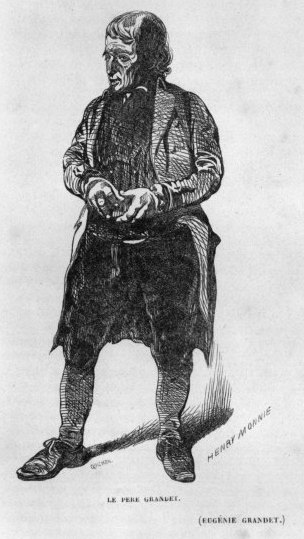
Father Grandet

If René Boylesve uses the historical episode of the “war of the basilicas” in Tours as a basis for his novel, he does not make it the main theme of his story; this event only occurs as a common thread in the story and the main characters who participated in it at the time do not appear in the novel. The author strives above all to describe, in a tenderly ironic manner, the chivalrous spirit and the rearguard battles of his heroine, ultimately "defeated by the forces of opportunism and hypocrisy”. André Bourgeois even establishes a parallel between Miss Cloque and the characters of Don Quixote or Cyrano de Bergerac, the old lady embodying the same ideal of the beautiful and the useless: “But know, my poor child (Miss Cloque addresses her niece, that everything that was most beautiful and greatest in the world was not necessary". It is the clash between idealism and realism, a theme dear to Boylesve and which he develops in many of his works: the ideals of Miss Cloque are defeated by the contingencies of the moment; Geneviève's ideal of love gives way, without her fighting, to respect for the conventions of her social class.

Between the reversals of alliances and opinions, Miss Cloque, and to a certain extent Mr. Houblon, maintain the same convictions and unfailing righteousness throughout the novel. Boylesve says to the old lady: “There is one thing I have never been able to bear, it is lukewarmness, it is what is done half-heartedly, it is what is neither good nor evil”. Miss Cloque's uprightness of mind even borders on rigidity, since she puts her faith and her interpretation of conventions before the family feelings that she nevertheless experiences. This is why André Bourgeois does not hesitate to describe her as a “monster” despite her fundamentally good character, like Father Grandet in Honoré de Balzac who also sacrifices the happiness of a child: Mademoiselle Cloque asks Geneviève to give up in writing to his marriage plan, just as Father Grandet demands from his daughter a document by which she relinquishes her mother's inheritance to him. Where Miss Cloque's blindness becomes manifest is when it seems logical, obvious to her, that Geneviève's feelings towards her fiancé were extinguished with the letter of renunciation.

Mademoiselle Cloque reappears in I Desired You One Evening (1925), a more autobiographical novel by René Boylesve. Her character, with slightly softened contours, nevertheless professes the same ideal of purity and righteousness that she tries to share with the narrator, a young adolescent, of whom she is the friend, the confidante but also the muse.

=== A bourgeois and realistic society ===
Many characters gravitate around Miss Cloque. Boylesve depicts the compromises and small calculations of everyone: religious people like Mgr Fripière and most of the basilicians like the Jouffroy ladies prefer to abandon their ideal so as not to risk losing everything; the Grenaille-Montcontour family ultimately chose a rapprochement with the Jewish lawyers Niort-Caen, better able to ensure its future within the bourgeoisie than a union with the Catholic but penniless Geneviève; as for Madame Pigeonneau-Exelcis, it was without qualms that in the name of commercial interest, she chose to open her religious bookstore to secular works, like Nana, after her move to street Royale.

The participation of the Niort-Caen family in the plot of the novel testifies to Boylesve's desire to show that the quiet and bourgeois life of a peaceful and Catholic provincial town can be disrupted by real estate expansion projects — Niort-Caen secretly purchased land initially planned to build the great basilica and now of no use— from an Israelite family whose social codes are completely different.

The only character maintaining perfect neutrality in this fight in which he does not get involved, is the Marquis d'Aubrebie who observes everyone. However, beneath a detached and sometimes slightly cynical exterior, it appears in the last lines of the work that he was perhaps the only true, sincere, and disinterested friend of Miss Cloque, no doubt admiring her constancy and stubbornness, without endorsing its opinions.

== An art of your time ==
=== Historical context ===
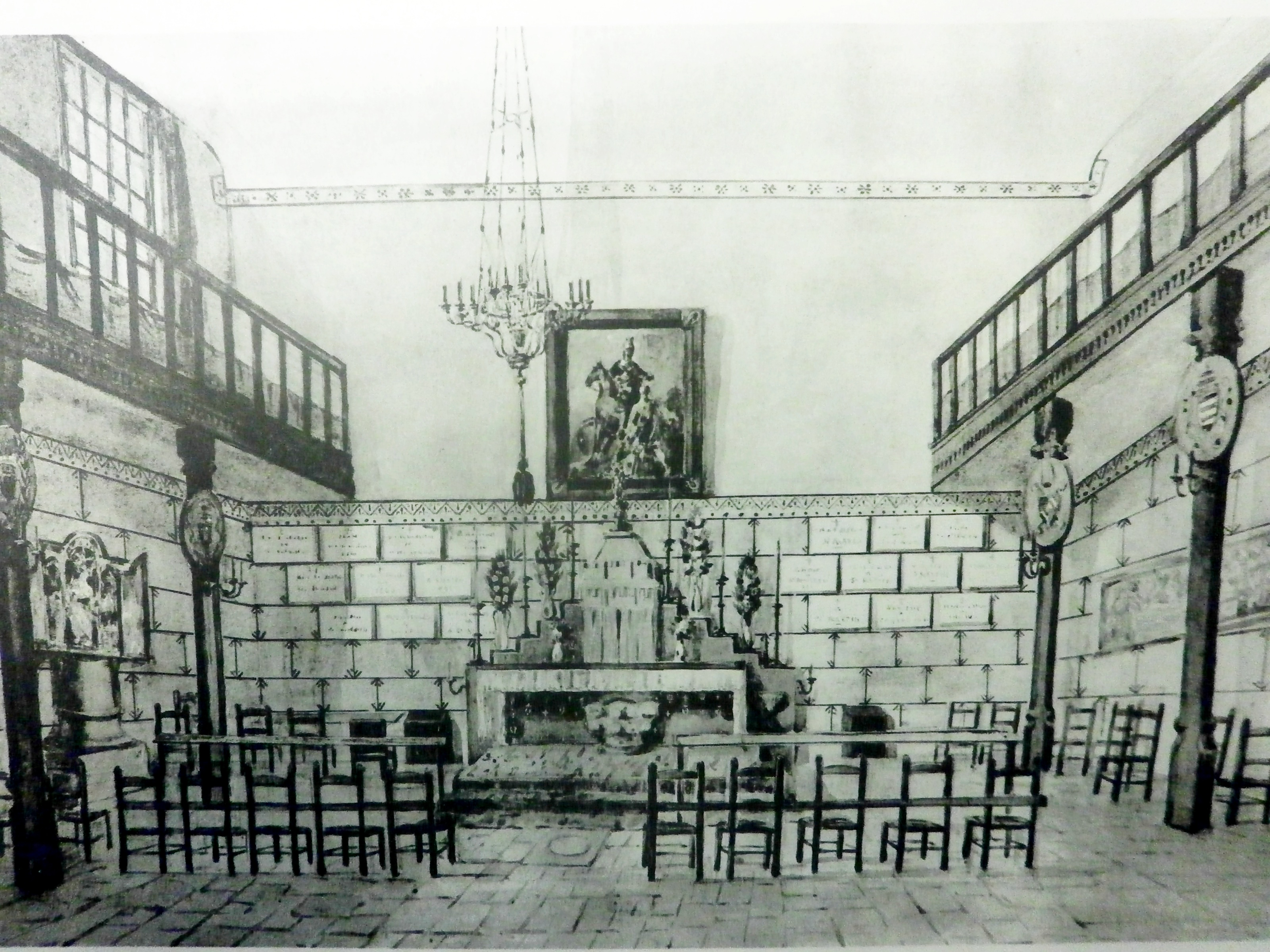
Temporary Chapel, 1880

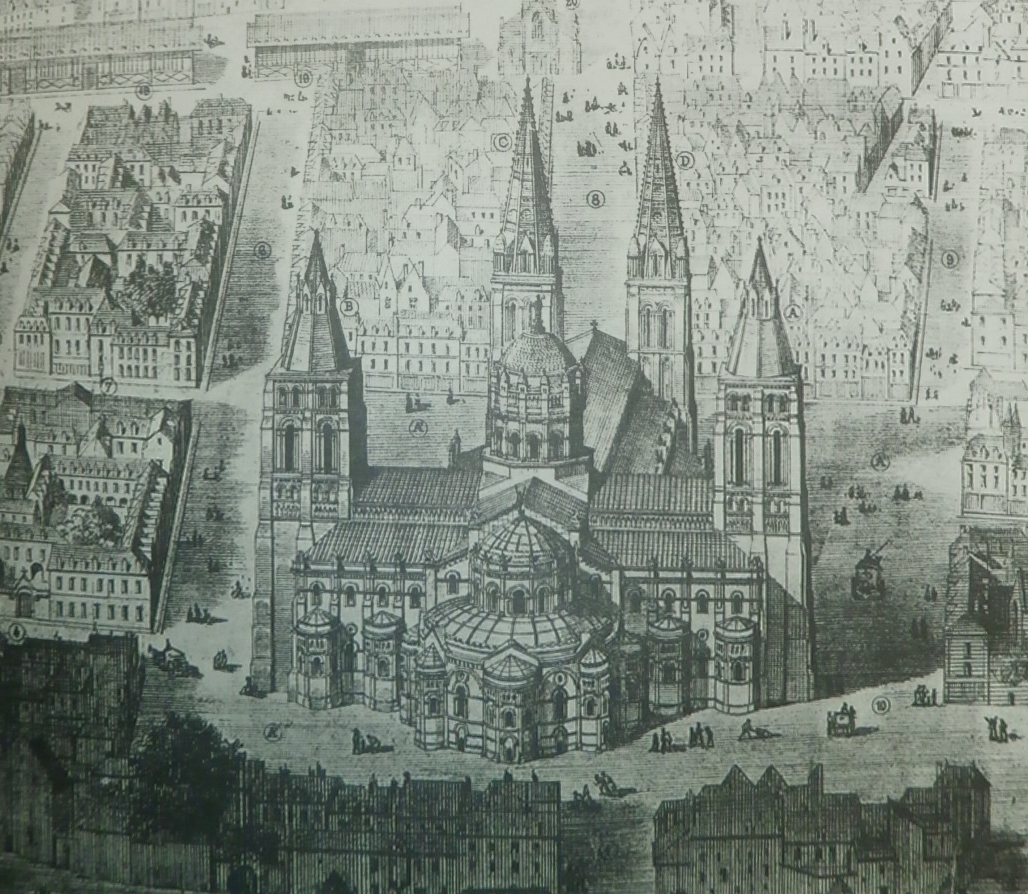
Project for the reconstruction of the “great” basilica (A.-J. Baillargé).

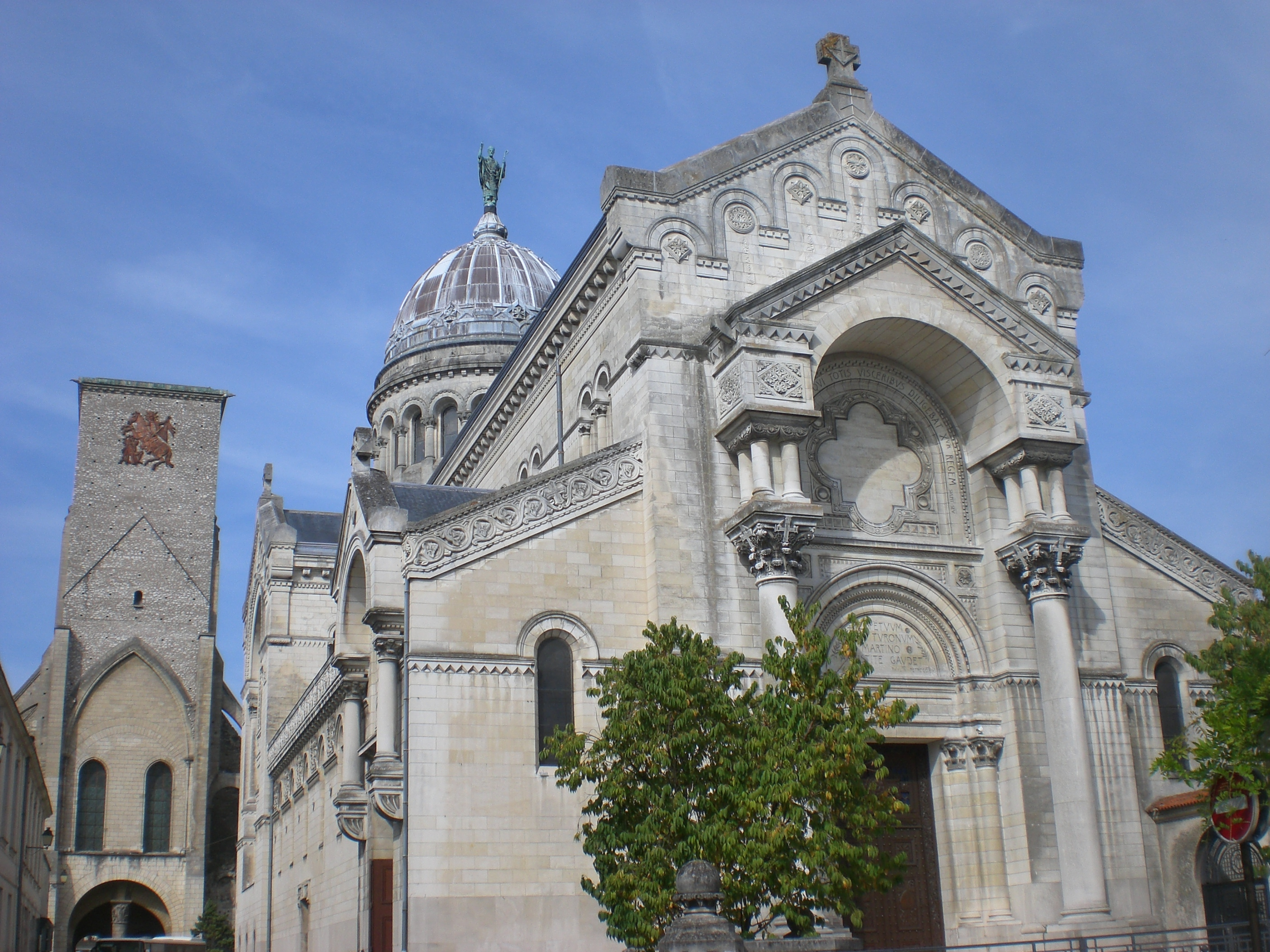
Neo-Byzantine basilica of Saint-Martin in Tours (V. Laloux).

The old Saint-Martin Basilica in Tours, which partially collapsed during the French Revolution due to lack of maintenance, was demolished at the very beginning of the 19th century. Examination of the plan of this basilica reveals that the tomb of the saint if it survived the destruction of the church, is buried in the cellars of the houses located at the eastern corner of the street des Halles and the newly opened street Descartes. The excavations undertaken after the acquisition of these residences effectively led to the discovery of the tomb on December 14, 1860. The construction of a new place of worship was therefore considered but, initially, a simple oratory and then a temporary chapel were built, taking advantage of the three houses whose cellars housed the tomb.

Two camps then formed in Tours and clashed violently for around thirty years, the equivalent of a “Touraine Dreyfus affair”. On the one hand, the most fervent Catholics, "traditionalists", resolutely monarchists, grouped within the Work of the Cloakroom of Saint-Martin, (Note: The Saint-Martin Cloakroom Work, originally a charitable organization providing clothing to the needy, is also responsible for searching for the remains of the tomb and, with a view to rebuilding the “great” basilica, is transformed into a real estate company to buy the houses covering the ruins.) are campaigning for the reconstruction of a "great" basilica, comparable to the destroyed one. Opposite, the diocesan architects, supported by the majority of the inhabitants of Tours, defend a less ambitious but above all less expensive project, of a more modest basilica, including only, in a crypt located under the choir, the remains of the tomb of Saint Martin. The recently elected municipal council of Tours, republican, fiercely anticlerical and led by the radical Armand-Félix Rivière, initially opposed both projects equally. The option of a small church ended up prevailing: at the end of the war of 1870, finances did not allow a large-scale expenditure and the influence of the supporters of the large basilica, clearly in the minority and not supported by the authorities of the clergy, is insufficient. The Archbishop of Tours Guillaume Meignan and Pope Leo XIII himself declared themselves in favor of the most modest project, finally approved by the prefect.

If the novel takes place over three years, probably between 1883 and 1887, at the height of this quarrel from which it borrows the main episodes, which Boylesve acknowledges in a letter to one of his friends, it is difficult to say specify the dating further. René Boylesve did not seek to respect a rigorous chronology for his story, where he stages real events that took place on different dates but which he makes contemporary for the needs of his novel. The first page of the manuscript, reproduced in the work of Émile Gérard-Gailly, begins with these words: “Around 1884, lived in Tours […]” which Boylesve crossed out and corrected to “Around 188.., lived in Tours […]".

=== Geographic context ===
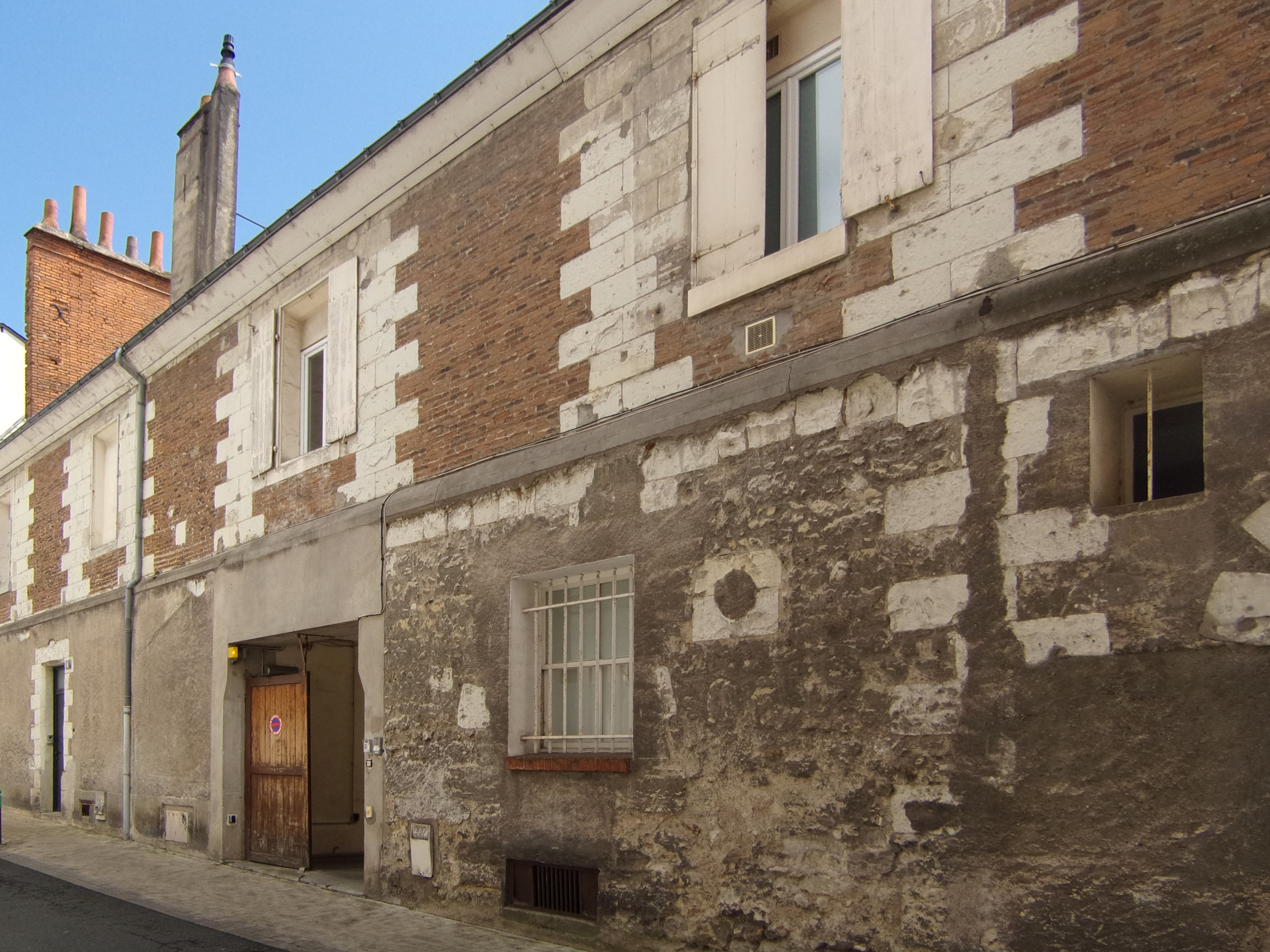
8, street "la Bourde" in Tours.

Main places mentioned in the novel. 1: Miss Cloque's home 2: Aubrebie hotel (?) 3: temporary chapel 4: Pigeonneau-Exelcis bookstore 5: Chapel of Perpetual Adoration 6: Saint-Clement church

The historical basis of the novel being the construction of a new basilica dedicated to the cult of Saint Martin after the rediscovery of his tomb, the plot can only take place in Tours.The geography of the city is respected and most of the places mentioned in the work are real: the Saint-Clément church (being demolished at the beginning of the novel), the streets Descartes, of la Bourde, Nationale (street Royale at beginning of the novel) in Tours, the Marmoutier institution where young Geneviève is a resident, buildings such as the temporary chapel or the chapel of the convent of Perpetual Adoration ( Saint-Jean chapel ) or even the Hôtel du Faisan (destroyed during the Second World War ) in street Royale. The Marquis d'Aubrebie's hotel very probably also existed, perhaps at n. 11 street de la Bourde, but the building having been rebuilt, it is not possible to confirm this. The Niort-Caen hotel in Avenue of la Tranchée, north of the Loire, is a faithful reproduction of a hotel near the home of Boylesve's father, at the same location.

As for Miss Cloque 's residence in street of la Bourde, although the number is not specified, its description by Boylesve corresponds exactly to that where the writer's maternal grandparents live, located at N.8 of this street, which is confirmed by the sister of René Boylesve.

Added to this proven topography are a few rare imaginary or recomposed sites, such as the Pigeonneau-Exelcis bookstore: there did exist on street des Halles, near the temporary chapel, a religious bookstore which served as a model in the first part of the novel. (Note: This Barbot-Berruer bookstore, renowned at the time, published during the four years it was published (March 1885-September 1888) the Revue littéraire de Touraine, a monthly publication where Boylesve published his first texts.) On the other hand, the location of the store after its move to street Royale does not correspond to any comparable bookstore; Boylesve, however, used authentic stores on this street to describe it.

== Characters ==
From 1883 to 1885, René Boylesve's maternal grandparents lived in Tours, in the Street of la Bourde, and almost all the characters in the novel are inspired by the Boylesve family entourage at the time or, more rarely, by well-known personalities.

=== Mademoiselle Cloque and her niece ===
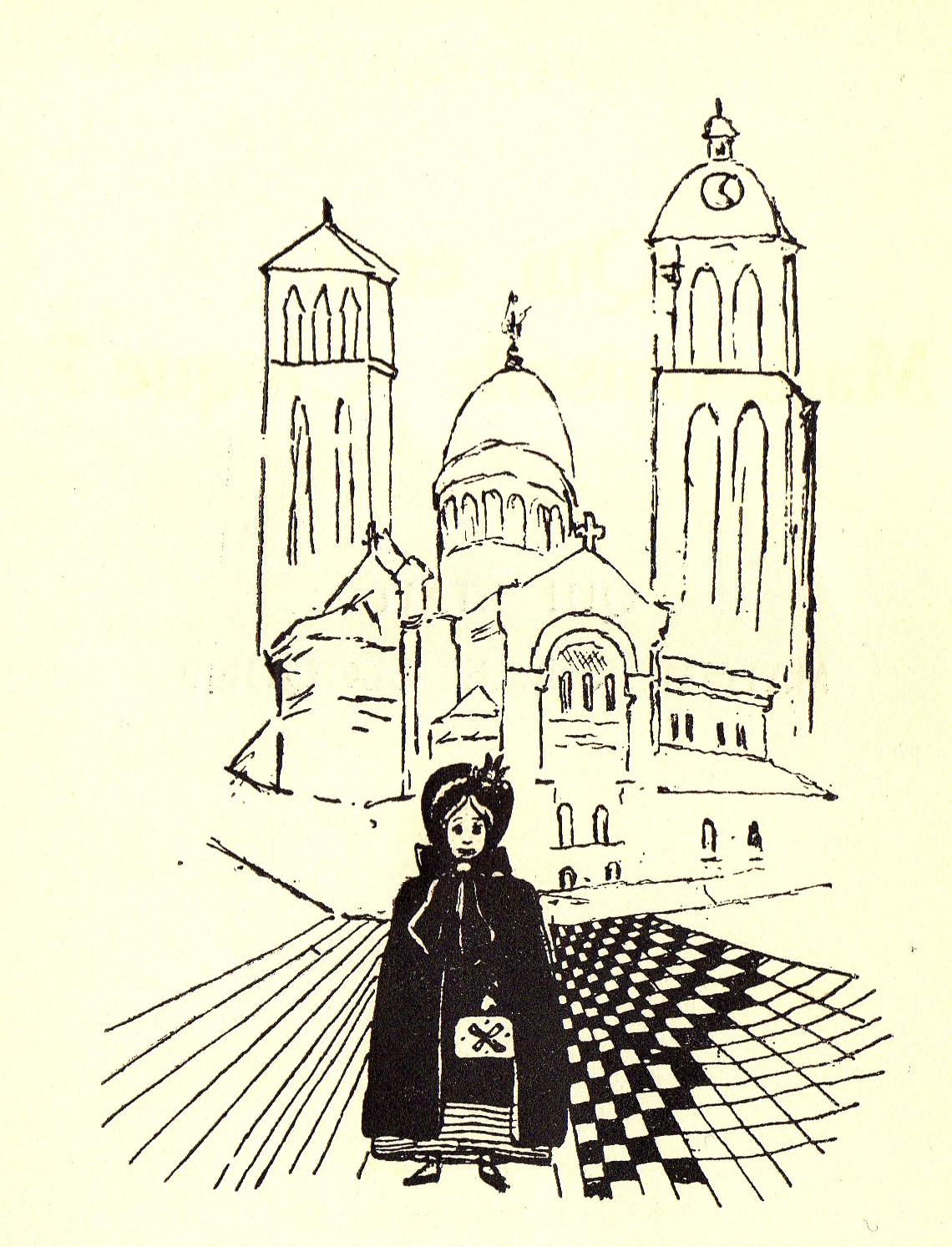
Drawing by René Boylesve in the manuscript of Mademoiselle Cloque (1898).

The central character, Athénaïs Cloque, is very likely modeled after a neighbor and friend of Boylesve's grandparents - she lives on the Strees des Halles -, a fervent believer called Adélaïde Blacque from Nogent-sur-Seine; the phonetic similarity between first and last names is striking. Boylesve, however, denies having been inspired, to portray his main character, by an existing person: "In all corners of France, and even abroad, I was told that my old lady lived, had lived, that she was easily recognized, and I was often given her name, her innumerable names. It was called this in Montpellier, like that in Clermont-Ferrand, and in Saint-Brieuc another way. It's only me who never knew the old lady. The fact remains that René Boylesve, in his working notes, wrote: “Long short story, short novel: Mademoiselle Cloque: the story of Mademoiselle Blacque and the old chapel of Saint-Martin de Tours”. Adélaïde Blacque is an admirer of Henri Lacordaire as Athénaïs Cloque is of Chateaubriand; in his preliminary notes, Boylesve even predicts that Miss Cloque, at the beginning of the novel, meets Lacordaire and not Chateaubriand. However, unlike the character she inspired, Miss Blacque took no active part in the war of the basilicas, even if she undoubtedly approved the project to build the great church. Mademoiselle Blacque was still living when the novel appeared, but Boylesve's maternal grandmother died in 1887, at the age of 73, like Miss Cloque and of a stroke like her.

=== Secondary characters ===
Concerning the Marquis d'Aubrebie, "gentle and reasonable philosopher" according to François Trémouilloux, Émile Gérard-Gailly writes: "It is, or I am very wrong, René Boylesve himself, with a white wig prematurely placed on his head». The emotions felt by the Marquis d'Aubrebie in the face of the agony and death of Miss Cloque could very well be those of René Boylesve himself in the face of the death of his grandmother in 1887. Boylesve would thus transform himself into an actor in his own stories through his characters, the Marquis d'Aubrebie in Mademoiselle Cloque and, in another register, Baron de Chemillé in Laçon d'amour dans un parc to which the novelist lends his own feelings.

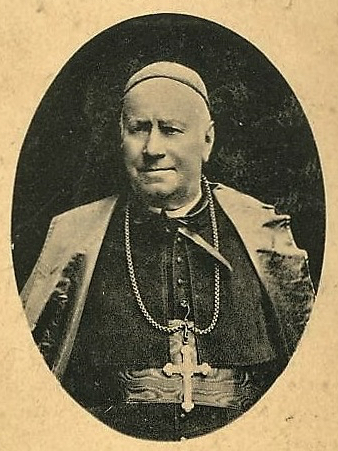
Guillaume Meignan.

“Monseigneur Fripière”, the archbishop of Tours who ends up taking the side of the republican chalet, is most probably Guillaume Meignan, archbishop of Tours at the end of the 19th century and whose pragmatism pushes him to adopt the same position. The name of the character seems to be an ironic nod to the profession of Guillaume Meignan's parents, cloth merchants, while Lord Fripière's mother is a toilet merchant.

Loupaing is the reflection of the neighbor and owner of René Boylesve's grandparents' house in Tours. He is a one-eyed and unsociable plumber - zinc worker named Compaing (or Campaign), as republican and anticlerical in life as in the book, municipal councilor of Tours in 1884. They have to put up with his annoyances and share a common courtyard with him and the other tenants, as in the novel; the similarity of the names Compaing/Loupaing is as revealing as for Blacque/Cloque.

Brother Gédéon, or “brother with the blue bands”, takes on the features of canon Stanislas Rosemberg, seller of religious souvenirs at the door of temporary chapel. (Note: Stanislas Rosemberg was sentenced to five years in prison for several financial embezzlements on March 12, 1904.) Monsieur Houblon (from Saint-Gilles) must be identified with Monsieur Salmon from Maison Rouge, organist in Saint-Martin, widower and father of four daughters as in the novel. The latter, however, does not demonstrate any religious activism and Boylesve seems to take this character trait from Stanislas Ratel, one of the main members of the Work of the Cloakroom.

Among the most notable characters in the novel, the Niort-Caen family, whose anthroponym is perhaps formed based on Lyon-Caen, has no identifiable local model according to Boylesve, while the Count of Grenaille-Montcontour could be the Count of Beaumont, from a family firmly established in Touraine G 14 24. These characters, moreover, do not appear or only rarely in the novel but they are according to Gérard-Gailly "powers even more than people, symbols rather than individuals".

== The writer facing his work ==
=== A hinge novel in Boylesve's career ===
Boylesve was already working on the novel which, after several developments, appeared under the title La Becquée when he began writing Mademoiselle Cloque. What should initially be just a long short story quickly becomes a novel to which Boylesve devotes himself entirely, temporarily interrupting the writing of his other work. It may only be seven months from the start of writing (July 1899) and the publication, in series then in volume (January 1899), by Mademoiselle Cloque.

Mademoiselle Cloque is the fifth novel published by René Boylesve. While the first four take place in the south of Touraine (Le Médecin des dames de Néans), Germany (Les Bains de Bade) or Italy (Sainte-Marie-des-Fleurs and Le Parfum des îles Borromées), Mademoiselle Cloque's main setting is the city of Tours and its immediate surroundings. In this novel, different the following two (La Becquée and L'Enfant à la balustrade ), Boylesve does not depict his own story or that of his family, even if he draws on places where he or his family lived, supplementing his memories by reading brochures that he brought from Tours to Aix-les-Bains, where he stayed when he wrote the novel. It seems that the purely autobiographical part, in this period of his career, has not yet been considered although he relies on real characters to portray his characters. This autobiographical period began in 1901 with La Becquée, a novel that also marked a break in style highlighted by Edmond Lefort. Until 1899 and Mademoiselle Cloque, Boylesve's style in a certain way prefigured that of Marcel Proust, and his publisher Louis Ganderax then criticized him for a certain lack of concision. From the publication of La Becquée, Boylesve took this criticism into account by evolving his writing style which became much more sober, the sentences shorter, going to the essential.

The publication of Mademoiselle Cloque was praised by critics. In this novel, Boylesve shows that he now masters his pen and that he has composed a "style", as Henri de Régnier points out in response to Boylesve's reception speech at the Académie française, the20 mars 1919: “If I stopped on this novel (Mademoiselle Cloque), it’s because I already find all your style there”. René Marill Albérès is more nuanced: in his work Histoire du roman moderne (1962), he regrets that the success of Mademoiselle Cloque is due “to a manner of academic application, to a set of proven recipes”, but this opinion remains in the minority, especially among the more recent specialists of Boylesve.

The novel is also cited as a reference in presentations of historical works devoted to the basilica.

=== Paradoxes of intention, paradox of construction ===
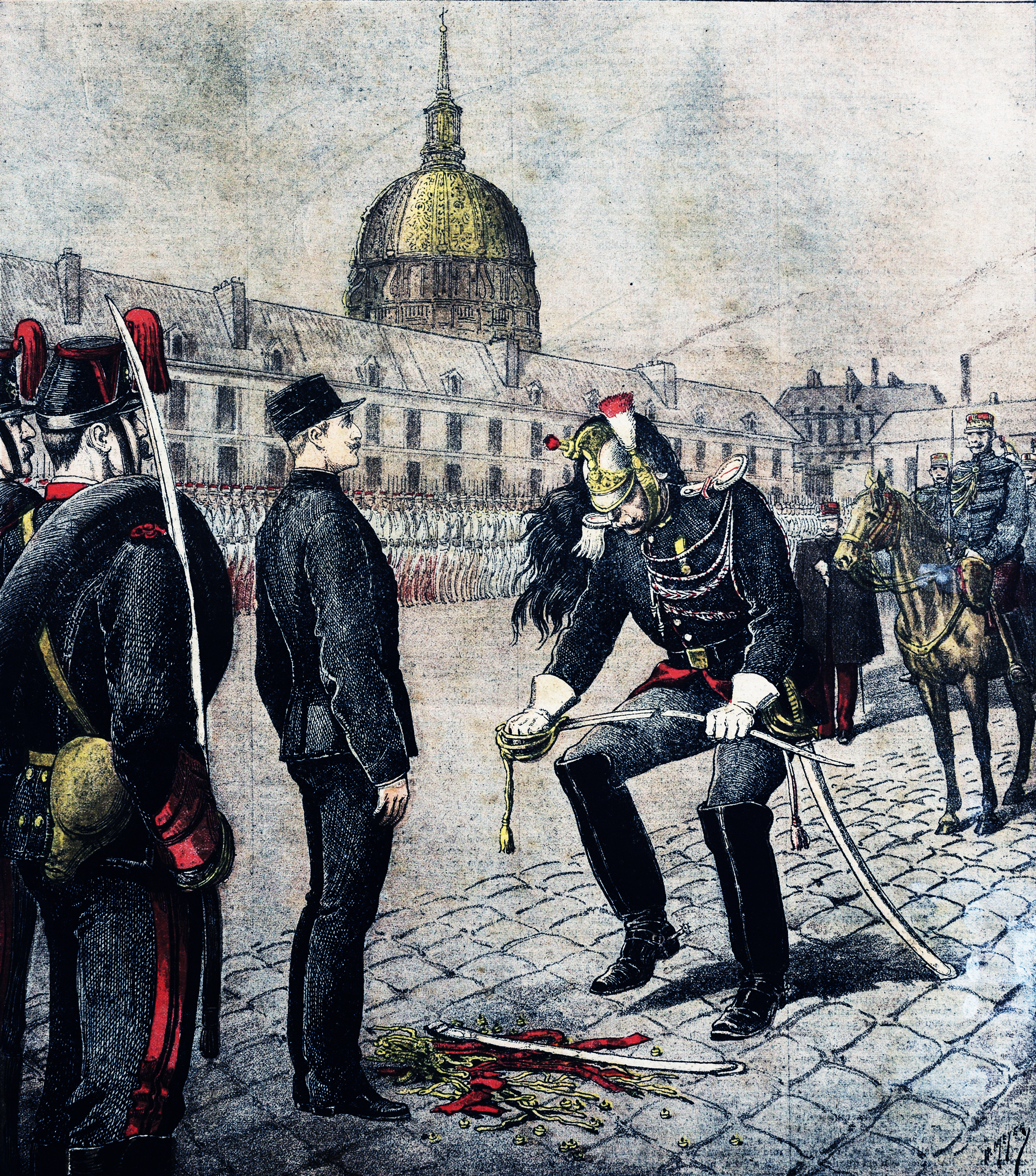
Degradation of Alfred Dreyfus, January 5, 1895( Henri Meyer, Le Petit Journal, January 13, 1895).

Boylesve cultivates in this novel, perhaps without wanting to, two paradoxes about the messages he delivers. Mademoiselle Cloque was published at the time of the Dreyfus affair - in 1899, the first judgment condemning Dreyfus had just been overturned by the Court of Cassation and a new war council was held in Rennes - and the writer, like several young authors of his time, manifests rather Dreyfusard opinions: however, the character and actions of the Niort-Caen family do not give a flattering opinion of the Jews, portrayed as greedy and unscrupulous. On the other hand, according to André Bourgeois, although in no way irreligious, Boylesve published a book "extremely dangerous for religion" due to the reasoning sometimes marked by "Jesuitism" of Miss Cloque.

The construction of the work also reveals itself to be paradoxical. The first seven chapters of the book clearly “star” the character of Miss Cloque: it is she, then eminently sympathetic, that the reader follows step by step in her relationships with those around her, in her activism in the service of “ great basilica. On the other hand, from Geneviève's vacation, it is the actions and feelings of the latter which seem to drive the plot and attract the attention and sympathy of the reader, Miss Cloque acting or reacting depending on her niece at the same time. time that she tarnishes her own image with her harshness and intransigence: it is then rather the theme of the “failed marriage” which is brought forward. As a result, according to André Bourgeois, the novel then seems to lose its unity to the extent that the main character is no longer unified. This construction in two stages, to the detriment of unity of action, is undoubtedly desired by Boylesve to maintain the attention of the reader, whom the sole question of the construction of the basilica cannot captivate throughout book.

== Editions ==
The manuscript of the novel is kept in the Manuscripts department of the Bibliothèque nationale de France. The text published in La Grande Revue conforms to this manuscript while the volume publication has undergone several revisions.

=== In French ===
- Mademoiselle Cloque: serialized publication in La Grande Revue from November 1898 to February 1899.
- Boylesve, Rene (1899). Mademoiselle Cloque (in French). Éditions de la Revue blanche.
- Boylesve, Rene; et al. (illustrator Adolphe Gumery) (1911). Mademoiselle Cloque (in French) (1 ed.). Paris: Librairie Arthème Fayard. p. 114.
- Boylesve, Rene (1921). Mademoiselle Cloque (in French). Paris: Calmann-Lévy.
- Boylesve, Rene; et al. (cover: Marie-Thérèse Mabille) (1985). Mademoiselle Cloque (in French). Chambray-lès-Tours: CLD. ISBN 978-2-6000-3450-0.
- Boylesve, Rene (2014). Mademoiselle Cloque. North Charleston (États-Unis): CreateSpace. ISBN 978-1-5053-2870-7.

=== In foreign languages ===
- Boylesve, Rene (1920). La Señorita Cloque (in Spanish). Translated by Gomez de la Mata, German. Valence: Prometeo.

== See also ==
- Basilica of Saint Martin, Tours
- Tours
