= Language council =

Organization that regulates a language

A language council, also known as a language regulator or a language academy, is an organisation that performs language planning or regulation. Some language councils are national and tied to a specific state, while councils without association to any country where the language is dominant also exist. Some language academies may be presciptivist. The exact functions varies from organisation to organisation and may include the establishment or promotion of an official or national language or orthography, research and documentation.

== Examples ==
- Cussel an Tavas Kernuak (the Cornish Language Council)
- European Language Council
- Norwegian Language Council
- Polish Language Council
- Swedish Language Council

== See also ==
- Académie française
- List of language regulators
