= EU Council =

EU Council may refer to the two following Brussels-based EU institutions:

- The Council of the European Union (occasionally named "Council of Ministers", simply "The Council", also stylised in Latin as Consilium)
  Founded in 1957 with the historical Treaty of Rome, it is now listed as the third of the seven EU institutions
- The European Council (also named "EU summits")
  Informally founded in 1961, officially became the second EU institution in 2009 with the Treaty of Lisbon

== See also ==
- European Council (disambiguation)
- Council of Europe, entirely separate international organisation founded in 1949, headquartered in Strasbourg, France
