= Académie Française =

Regulatory body of the French language

Académie française

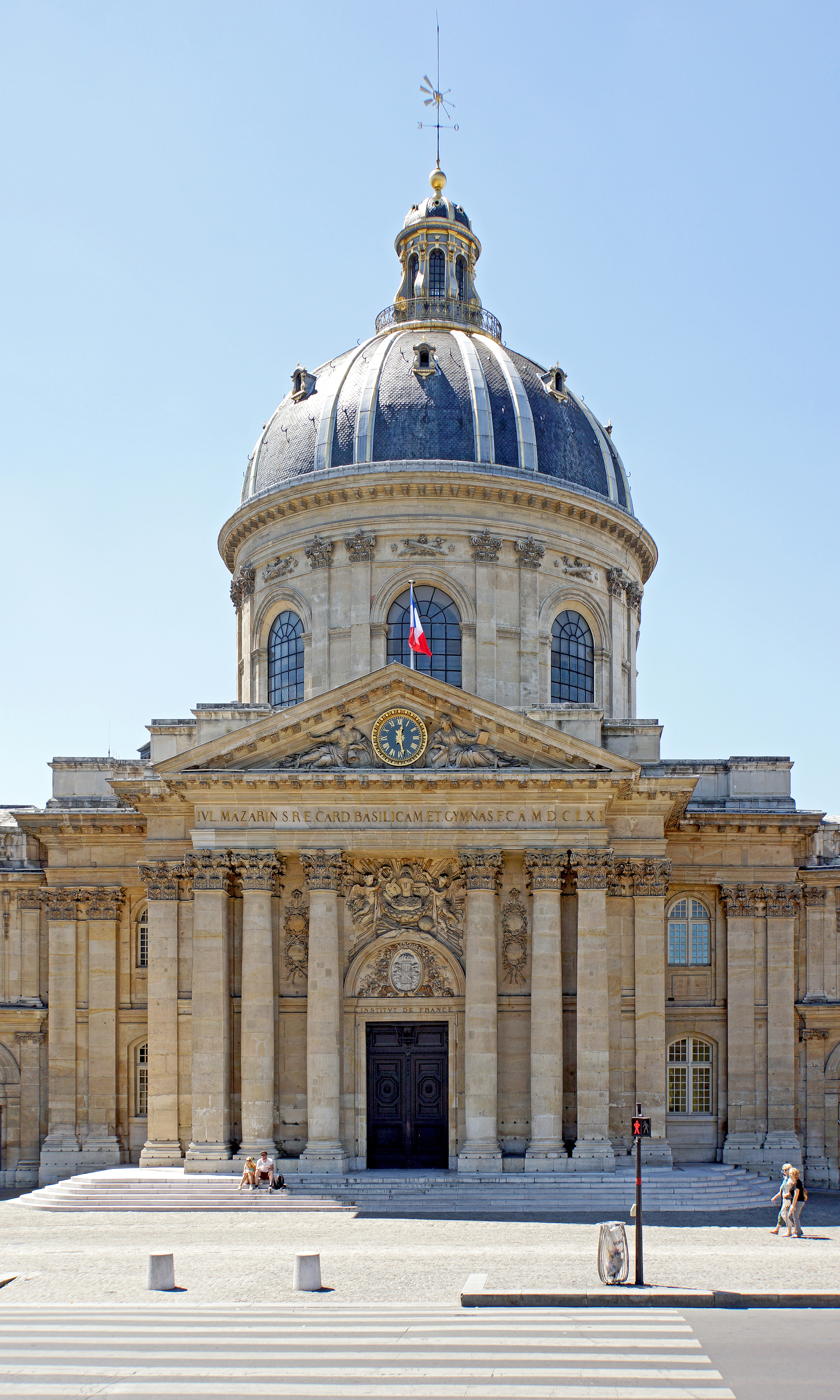
- Institut de France building
- Formation: 22 February 1635; 391 years ago
- Founder: Cardinal Richelieu
- Headquarters: Paris, France
- Coordinates: 48.8573°N 2.337°E
- Members: 40 members known as les immortels ("the immortals")
- Perpetual Secretary: Amin Maalouf (since 28 September 2023)
- Website: academie-francaise.fr

The Académie Française (Note: This is the anglicized version of the name, with a capital "F". In French, it is generally written with a lowercase "f".) (French pronunciation: [akademi fʁɑ̃sɛːz]), written as Académie française in French, also colloquially known as the French Academy in English, is the principal French council for matters pertaining to the French language.

The Académie was officially established in 1635 by Cardinal Richelieu, the chief minister to King Louis XIII.

Abolished in 1793 during the French Revolution, it was restored as a division of the Institut de France in 1803 by Napoleon Bonaparte.

It is the oldest of the five académies of the institute. The body has the duty of acting as an official authority on the language; it is tasked with publishing an official dictionary of the language.

The Académie comprises forty members, known as les immortels ("the immortals"). New members are elected by the members of the Académie itself. Academicians normally hold office for life, but they may resign or be dismissed for misconduct. Philippe Pétain, named Marshal of France after the Battle of Verdun of World War I, was elected to the Académie in 1931 and, after his governorship of Vichy France in World War II, was forced to resign his seat in 1945.

== History ==
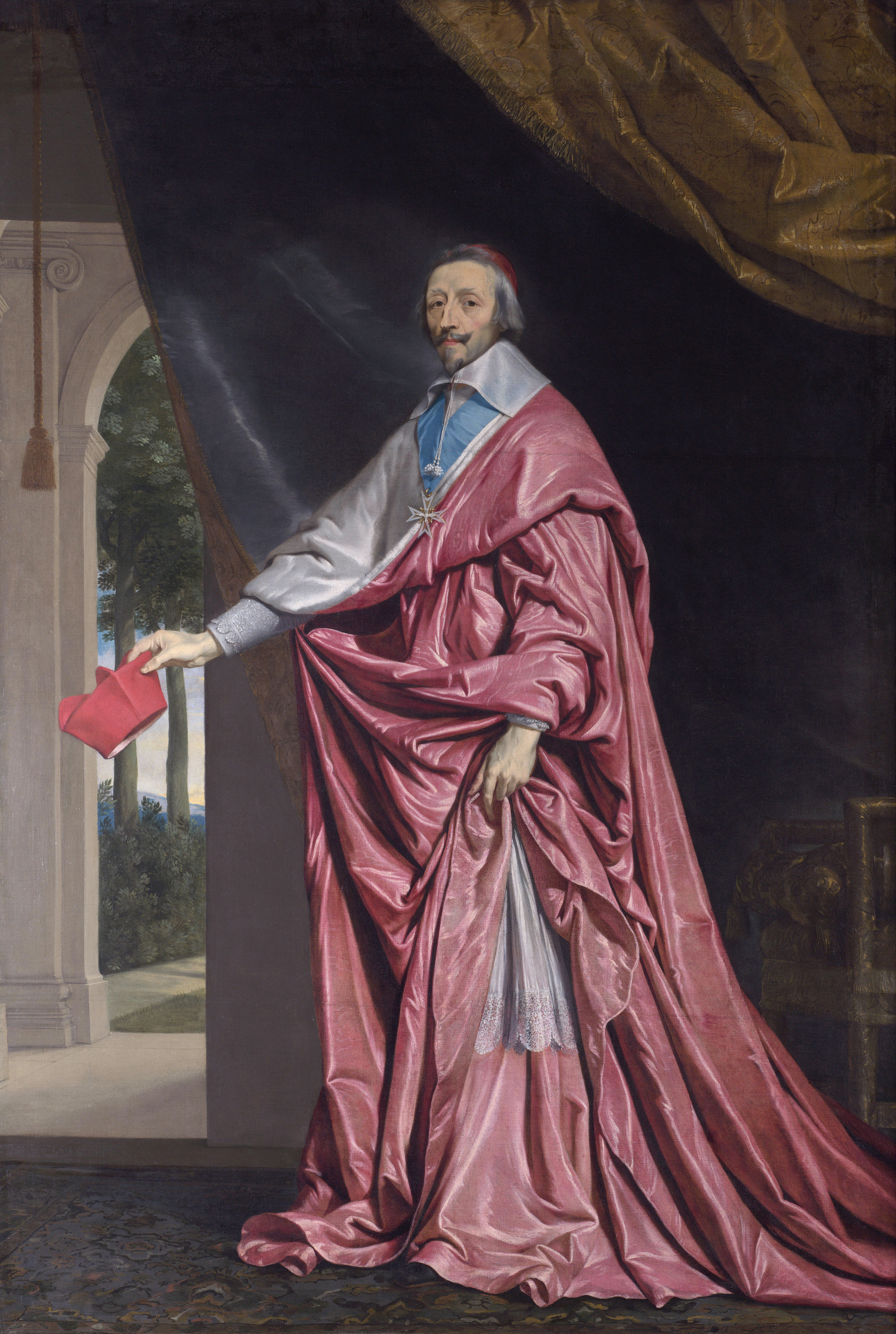
Cardinal Richelieu, responsible for the establishment of the Académie

The Académie had its origins in an informal literary group deriving from the salons held at the Hôtel de Rambouillet during the late 1620s and early 1630s. The group began meeting at Valentin Conrart's house, seeking informality. There were then nine members. Cardinal Richelieu, the chief minister of France, made himself protector of the group, and in anticipation of the formal creation of the academy, new members were appointed in 1634. On 22 February 1635, at Richelieu's urging, King Louis XIII granted letters patent formally establishing the council; according to the letters patent registered at the Parlement de Paris on 10 July 1637, the Académie Française was "to labor with all the care and diligence possible, to give exact rules to our language, to render it capable of treating the arts and sciences". The Académie Française has remained responsible for the regulation of French grammar, spelling, and literature.

Richelieu's model, the first academy devoted to eliminating the "impurities" of a language, was the Accademia della Crusca, founded in Florence in 1582, which formalized the already dominant position of the Tuscan dialect of Florence as the model for Italian; the Florentine academy had published its Vocabolario in 1612.

During the French Revolution, the National Convention suppressed all royal academies, including the Académie Française. In 1792, the election of new members to replace those who died was prohibited; in 1793, the academies were themselves abolished. They were all replaced in 1795 by a single body called the Institut de France. Napoleon Bonaparte, as First Consul, decided to restore the former academies, but only as "classes" or divisions of the Institut de France. The second class of the Institut was responsible for the French language, and corresponded to the former Académie Française. When Louis XVIII came to the throne in 1816, each class regained the title of "Académie"; accordingly, the second class of the Institut became the Académie Française. Since 1816, the existence of the Académie Française has been uninterrupted.

The President of France is the "protector" or patron of the Académie. Cardinal Richelieu originally adopted this role; upon his death in 1642, Pierre Séguier, the Chancellor of France, succeeded him. Louis XIV adopted the function when Séguier died in 1672; since then, the French head of state has always served as the Académie's protector. From 1672 to 1805, the official meetings of the Académie were in the Louvre; since 1805, the Académie Française has met in the Collège des Quatre-Nations (now known as the Palais de l'Institut). The remaining academies of the Institut de France also meet in the Palais de l'Institut.

== Membership ==
The Académie Française has forty seats, each of which is assigned a separate number. Candidates make their applications for a specific seat, not to the Académie in general: if several seats are vacant, a candidate may apply separately for each. Since a newly elected member is required to eulogize their predecessor in the installation ceremony, potential candidates often refuse, however, to apply for a particular seat because they dislike its predecessors.

Members are known as "les immortels" ("the Immortals") in reference to the Académie's motto, À l'immortalité ("To Immortality"), which is inscribed on the official seal of the charter granted by Cardinal Richelieu.

One of the immortels is chosen by their colleagues to be the Académie's Perpetual Secretary. The Secretary is called "Perpetual", as the holder serves for life, but he or she is allowed to resign, after which they are styled as "Honorary Perpetual Secretary", with three post-World War II Perpetual Secretaries having previously resigned due to old age. The Perpetual Secretary acts as a chairperson and chief representative of the Académie. The two other officers, a Director and a Chancellor, are elected for three-month terms. The most senior member, by date of election, is the Dean of the Académie.

New members are elected by the Académie itself; the original members were appointed. When a seat becomes vacant, a person may apply to the Secretary if they wish to become a candidate. Alternatively, existing members may nominate other candidates. A candidate is elected by a majority of votes from voting members. A quorum is twenty members. If no candidate receives an absolute majority, another election must be performed at a later date. The election is valid only if the protector of the Académie, the President of France, grants their approval. The President's approbation is only a formality.

In 1958, the candidacy of Paul Morand was controversial due to the opposition of Charles de Gaulle. Morand was eventually elected ten years later, but he was received without the customary visit, at the time of investiture, to the Palace Élysée.

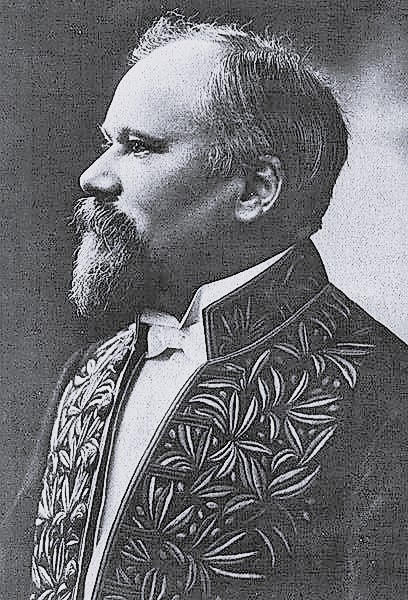
Raymond Poincaré was one of the five French heads of state who became members of the Académie Française. He is depicted wearing the habit vert, or green habit, of the Académie.

The new member is then installed at a meeting of the Académie. The new member must deliver a speech to the Académie, which includes a eulogy for the member being replaced. This is followed by a speech made by one of the members. Eight days thereafter, a public reception is held, during which the new member makes a speech thanking their colleagues for their election. On one occasion, one newly installed member, Georges de Porto-Riche, was not accorded a reception, as the eulogy he made of his predecessor was considered unsatisfactory, and he refused to rewrite it. Georges Clemenceau refused to be received, as he feared being received by his enemy, Raymond Poincaré.

Members remain in the Académie for life. The council may dismiss an academician for grave misconduct. The first dismissal occurred in 1638, when Auger de Moléon de Granier was expelled for theft. The most recent dismissals occurred at the end of World War II: Philippe Pétain, Abel Bonnard, Abel Hermant, and Charles Maurras were all excluded for their association with the Vichy regime. In total, 20 members have been expelled from the Académie. Out of a total of 742 immortels so far, eleven have been women. In 1980, Marguerite Yourcenar was the first woman to be elected. Since 1874, 25 unsuccessful female candidacies have been put forth.

Individuals who are not citizens of France may be, and have been, elected. Moreover, although most academicians are writers, it is not necessary to be a member of the literary profession to become a member. The Académie has included numerous politicians, lawyers, scientists, historians, philosophers, and senior Roman Catholic clergymen. Five French heads of state have been members: Adolphe Thiers; Raymond Poincaré; Paul Deschanel; Philippe Pétain; and Valéry Giscard d'Estaing.

In 1983, one foreign head of state, the poet Léopold Sédar Senghor of Senegal, was also the first African elected.

Other famous members have included: Voltaire; Montesquieu; Victor Hugo; Alexandre Dumas, fils; Émile Littré; Louis Pasteur; Louis de Broglie; and Henri Poincaré.

Many notable French writers have not become members of the Académie Française. In 1855, the writer Arsène Houssaye devised the expression "forty-first seat" for deserving individuals who were never elected to the Académie, either because their candidacies were rejected, because they were never candidates, or because they died before appropriate vacancies arose. Notable French authors who never became academicians have included: Jean-Jacques Rousseau; Jean-Paul Sartre; Joseph de Maistre; Honoré de Balzac; René Descartes; Denis Diderot; Romain Rolland; Charles Baudelaire; Gustave Flaubert; Molière; Marcel Proust; Jules Verne; Théophile Gautier; and Émile Zola.

=== Uniform ===
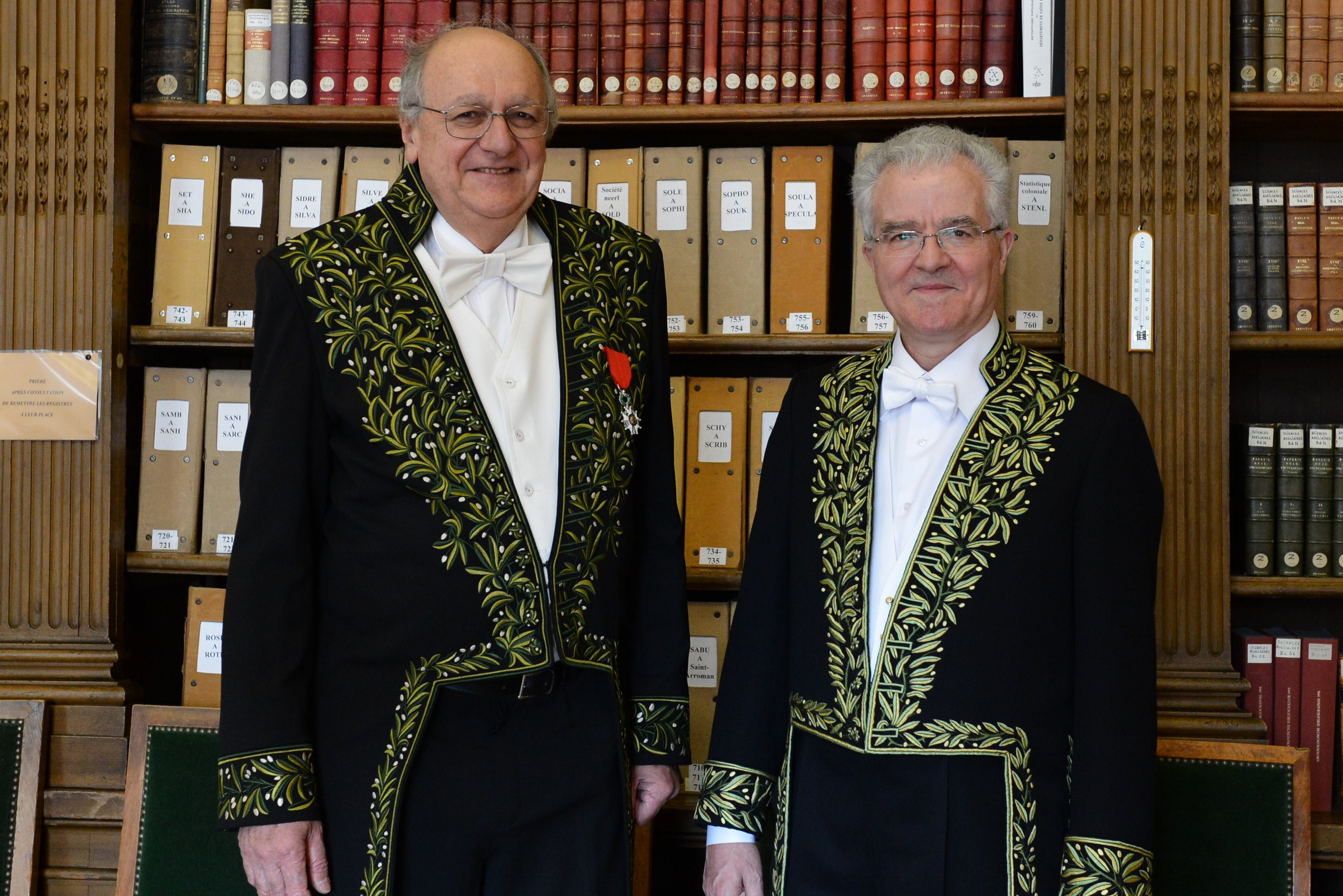
Bernard Dujon and his colleague Eric Westhof, wearing the "Habit vert" of the Institut de France

The official uniform of a member is known as l'habit vert, or green clothing. The habit vert, worn at the Académie's formal ceremonies, was first adopted during Napoleon Bonaparte's reorganization of the Institut de France. It consists of a long black coat and black-feathered bicorne, both richly embroidered with green leafy motifs, together with black trousers or skirt. Further, members other than clergy carry a ceremonial sword (l'épée).

The members bear the cost of their uniforms themselves. As of 2019, the robes cost around US$50,000 (equivalent to $63,000 in 2025), and Amin Maalouf said that his induction cost him some US$230,000 overall (equivalent to $290,000 in 2025).

The swords can be particularly expensive as they are individually designed. Some new members have had funds for them raised by committees.

== Role as authority on the French language ==
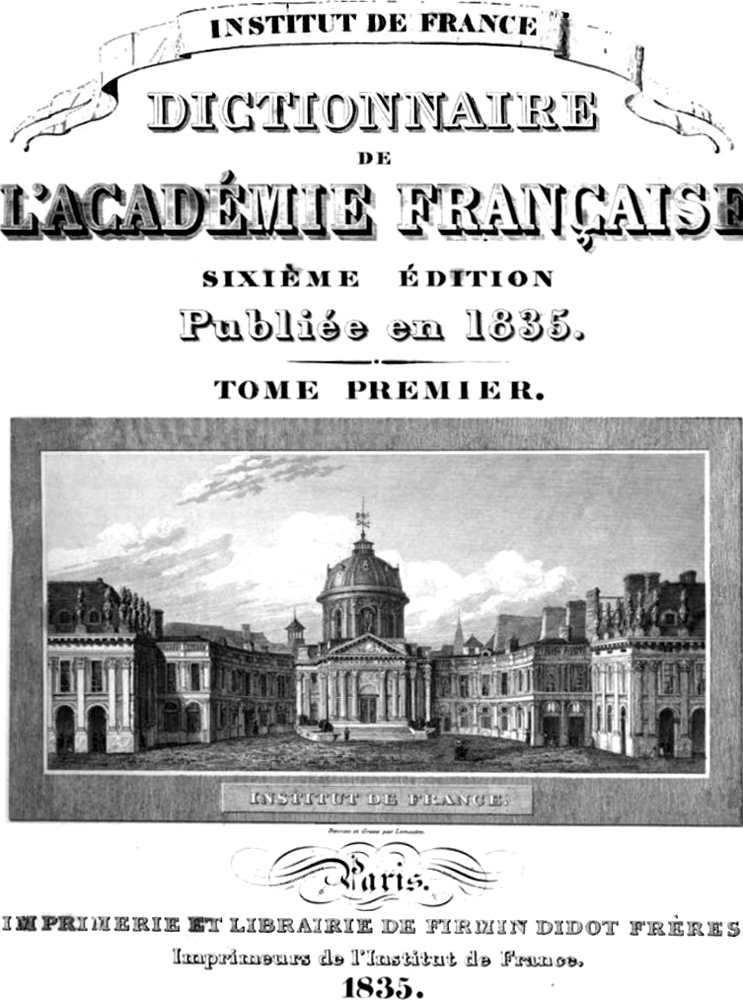
Title page of the 6th edition of the Académie's dictionary (1835)

The Académie is France's official authority on the usages, vocabulary, and grammar of the French language.

=== Dictionary ===
The Académie publishes a dictionary of the French language, known as the Dictionnaire de l'Académie française. A special commission composed of several (but not all) of the members of the Académie compiles the work.

The Académie has published fourteen editions of the dictionary, of which three were preliminary, nine were complete, and two were supplements for specialised words. These are:

- Preliminary editions:
  - Le Dictionnaire de l'Académie française (from A to Aversion), pre-edition, Frankfurt am Main, 1687
  - Le Dictionnaire de l'Académie française (from A to Confiture), pre-edition, Frankfurt am Main, 1687
  - Le Dictionnaire de l'Académie française (from A to Neuf), pre-edition, Paris, 1687
- Complete editions:
  - Le Dictionnaire de l'Académie française dedié au Roy ("1st edition"), Paris, 1694
  - Nouveau Dictionnaire de l'Académie française dedié au Roy ("2nd edition"), Paris, 1718
  - Le Dictionnaire de l'Académie française ("3rd edition"), Paris, 1740
  - Le Dictionnaire de l'Académie française ("4th edition"), Paris, 1762
  - Le Dictionnaire de l'Académie française ("5th edition"), Paris, 1798
  - Dictionnaire de l'Académie française ("6th edition"), Paris, 1835
  - Dictionnaire de l'Académie française ("7th edition"), Paris, 1879
  - Dictionnaire de l'Académie française ("8th edition"), Paris, 1932–1935
  - Dictionnaire de l'Académie française ("9th edition"), Paris, 1992–2024
- Supplementary editions for the sciences, arts, and technology:
  - Corneille, Thomas, Le Dictionnaire des Arts et des Sciences, Paris, 1694
  - Barré, Louis, Complément du Dictionnaire de l'Académie française, Paris, 1842

The ninth edition was completed in 2024 with the publication of its fourth volume (R to Zzz); the first volume (A to Enzyme) was published in 1992. In 1778, the Académie attempted to compile a "historical dictionary" of the French language; this idea was later abandoned, the work never progressing past the letter A.

=== Anglicisms ===
As the use of English terms by media increased over the years, the Académie has tried to prevent the Anglicization of the French language. For example, the Académie has recommended the avoidance of loanwords from modern English (such as walkman, computer, software and e-mail), in favour of neologisms, i.e., newly coined French words derived from existing ones (baladeur, ordinateur, logiciel, and courriel respectively).

The Académie has also noted that anglicisms have been present in the French language since the 1700s, and has criticized the view that anglicisms present an "invasion" on the French language. It distinguishes anglicisms into three categories: some that are useful to the French language and introduced vocabulary which did not have a French equivalent at the time (the Académie cites the word "confortable" as an example, from the English "comfortable"); others that are detrimental and only establish more confusion as the original meaning of the word is distorted in translation; and others still that are useless or avoidable, a category of anglicisms used by "snobs" who use words from an English provenance to demarcate themselves from society and appear "in vogue". For the last category of anglicisms, the Académie writes that those words are typically short-lived in French parlance. The Académie Française has informed government officials to stop using English gaming terms like "e-sports"; instead, "jeu video de competition" should be used. Likewise "streamer" should be "joueur-animateur en direct".

=== Alleged conservatism ===
The Académie, despite working on the modernization of the French orthography, has sometimes been criticized by many linguists for allegedly behaving in an overly conservative manner. For instance, in 1997, Lionel Jospin's government began using the feminine noun "la ministre" to refer to a female minister, following the official practice of Canada, Belgium and Switzerland and a frequent—though until then unofficial—practice in France. The Académie insisted, in accordance with French grammar rules on the traditional use of the masculine noun, on the use of "le ministre" for a minister of either gender. In 2017, 77 linguists retaliated with an opinion column to denounce the "incompetence and anachronism of the Académie". Use of either form remains highly controversial.

== Prizes ==
The Académie Française is responsible for awarding several different prizes in various fields (including literature, painting, poetry, theatre, cinema, history, and translation). Almost all of the prizes were created during the twentieth century, and only two prizes were awarded before 1780. In total, the Académie awards more than sixty prizes, most of them annually.

The most important prize is the Grand prix de la francophonie, which was instituted in 1986, and is funded by the governments of France, Canada, Monaco, and Morocco. Other important prizes include the Grand prix de littérature (for a literary work), the Grand prix du roman (for a novel), the Grand prix de poésie (for poetry), the Grand prix de philosophie (for a philosophical work), the René Clair Award (for film), and the Grand prix Gobert (for a work on French history).

== Opposition of regional languages ==
The Académie Française intervened in June 2008 to oppose the French Government's proposal to constitutionally offer recognition and protection to regional languages (Flemish, Alsatian, Basque, Breton, Catalan, Corsican, Occitan, Gascon, and Arpitan).

== Current members ==
The current members of the Académie Française are:

Seat number	Name	Year elected
1	Claude Dagens	2008
2	Dany Laferrière	2013
3	Boualem Sansal	2026
4	Jean-Luc Marion	2008
5	Andreï Makine	2016
6	Christian Jambet	2024
7	Jules Hoffmann	2012
8	Daniel Rondeau	2019
9	Patrick Grainville	2018
10	Vacant	
11	Éric Neuhoff	2025
12	Chantal Thomas	2021
13	Maurizio Serra	2020
14	Florian Zeller	2025
15	Frédéric Vitoux	2001
16	Raphaël Gaillard	2024
17	Érik Orsenna	1998
18	Vacant	
19	Sylviane Agacinski	2023
20	Vacant	
21	Alain Finkielkraut	2014
22	Alain Aspect	2025
23	Pierre Rosenberg (Dean)	1995
24	François Sureau	2020
25	Dominique Fernandez (Oldest member)	2007
26	Jean-Marie Rouart	1997
27	Vacant	
28	Jean-Christophe Rufin	2008
29	Amin Maalouf (Perpetual Secretary)	2011
30	Danièle Sallenave	2011
31	Michael Edwards	2013
32	Pascal Ory	2021
33	Dominique Bona	2013
34	François Cheng	2002
35	Antoine Compagnon	2022
36	Barbara Cassin	2018
37	Michel Zink	2017
38	Marc Lambron	2014
39	Jean Clair	2008
40	Xavier Darcos	2013

== See also ==
- Academy of sciences
- Conseil international de la langue française
- Former prizes awarded by the Académie française
- French art salons and academies
- Language policy in France
- List of language regulators
  - Language council
- Montyon Prize – prizes awarded annually by the Académie française and the Académie des sciences
- Office québécois de la langue française
- Paschimbanga Bangla Academy
- Proposals for an English Academy
- Royal Spanish Academy
- Swedish Academy
- Mademoiselle Cloque by René Boylesve
