= Auger de Moléon de Granier =

French writer

Auger de Moléon Granier (c. 1600 – after 1652) was a French writer. Little is known of his life (he may have originated in Bresse and been an ecclesiastic), but he is notable for being the first member of the Académie française ever to be expelled, for theft, only 6 months after his election to it in September 1635.

== Works ==
He published unedited manuscripts, including Les Mémoires de la roine Marguerite et Les Lettres de Messire de Paul de Foix, archevesque de Toloze et ambassadeur pour le roy aupres du pape Grégoire XIII, escrites au roi Henry III in 1628, though the authenticity of the letters in the latter is doubtful.
