= Jerzy Bartmiński =

Polish linguist and ethnologist (1939–2022)

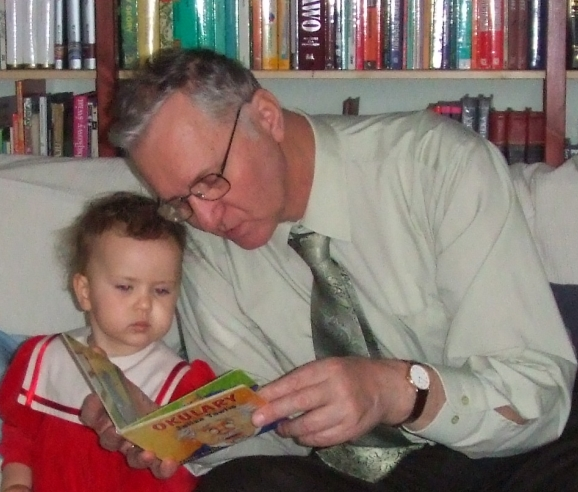
- Bartmiński with one of his 15 grandchildren, Warsaw, Poland 2006
- Born: 19 September 1939; Przemyśl, Poland
- Died: 7 February 2022 (aged 82); Lublin, Poland

Jerzy Bartmiński (19 September 1939 – 7 February 2022) was a Polish linguist and ethnologist.

== Biography ==
Bartmiński was born on 19 September 1939 in Przemyśl to a Polish family of Galician craftsmen. He moved to Lublin in 1956, where he lived until his death in 2022.

Bartmiński studied Polish philology and in 1971 earned his PhD, focusing his research on the language of folklore. As a young scholar at Lublin's Maria Curie-Skłodowska University, he established, together with his wife Izabela and children, one of the first groups of the home church Catholic renewal movement in Poland.

In the 1980s, Bartmiński took part in anti-communist activities as a member of Solidarity and was a university leader of the movement in Lublin. He was repressed after martial law was declared in 1981. Later, Bartmiński was one of the founders of "Solidarity of Families" movement and foundation, focusing on reactivation of social bonds in post-communist society, support for poor families, and educational support for children.

In the Fall of 1996, Bartmiński was a Residential Fellow at the Swedish Collegium for Advanced Study in Uppsala, Sweden.

On 22 September 2001 he married his second wife Stanisława Niebrzegowska-Bartmińska.

Bartmiński died in Lublin on 7 February 2022, at the age of 82.

== Career ==
Bartmiński was member of the Polish Academy of Arts and Sciences and professor of Polish philology at Maria Curie-Skłodowska University. From 1976, he led the research team that has been reorganized as the Department of Textology and Grammar of Contemporary Polish Language. For several years, he had been the chairman of jury of folklore songs festival in Kazimierz Dolny, one of the largest events of this kind in Central Europe. He was also a member of the Polish Language Council.

He authored over 300 publications and books. One of his last books, Linguistic Bases of the Perception of the World (Językowe podstawy obrazu świata, 2007), is considered to be among the most significant Polish publications in the disciplines of the humanities.

His research interests focused on textology, linguistic axiology and ethnolinguistics.
