= Dukaism =

Gender-neutral grammatical forms in Polish

Dukaisms and dukatives (also referred to in Polish as postgender or posthuman grammar or forms) refers to a collection of gender-neutral grammatical forms (going beyond the three traditional grammatical genders – masculine, feminine, neuter), created by the writer Jacek Dukaj for his 2004 science fiction novel, Perfect Imperfection. Dukaisms since became used in other contexts, by other authors, translators, and also by some non-binary people.

== History and popularization ==
Dukaism were created as artistic neologisms invented by Polish writer Jacek Dukaj for his 2004 science fiction novel, Perfect Imperfection (2004) and subsequently they were named after him. In his novel, posthuman beings (phoebe) generally have no sex, gender or even biological bodies. The aim of dukaisms was to familiarize the reader with the notion of a being that does not concern itself with the concept of gender. Dukaj is known for his experimental literature, and when the novel was released, dukaisms were described as his most radical linguistic experiment yet.

Going beyond the three traditional grammatical genders – masculine, feminine and neuter – dukaisms concern the gender described as postgender. Although they originated as a literary experiment, they have since been accepted in the Polish language and used outside of the novel they debuted in. They became used by some non-binary people in Poland, which lead to their popularization. They have also been used occasionally by other Polish science fiction writers, as well as translators, particularly in contexts related to non-binary characters, real or fictional.

Dukaisms are one of the neopronouns proposed in the Polish language. As of 2025, it is not clear how enduring they will be, as other, competing gender-neutral solutions have been proposed as well. There are also combinations of dukaisms with other forms, and forms that are elaborations of dukaisms, developed without input from Dukaj (such as dukatives).

== Grammar ==
Dukaisms are based on novel conjugation and declension. Dukaj himself referred to them as "postgender grammar". The term dukaisms is used characteristically for verbal and pronominal forms, while for the noun form the term dukatives has been proposed. Dukatives did not exist in Dukaj's novel, and were not invented by Dukaj. An example of a dukative of the noun przyjaciel (friend, masculine form) and przyjaciółka (friend, feminine form) is przyjaciołu.

These dukaisms are based on feminine bases, exchanging the letter "a" for "u", e.g.: zrobiłum, poszłuś, mogłubyś. Because of the characteristics of Polish grammar, dukaisms are primarily visible in the singular grammatical number and not in plural.

According to Polish literature scholar, Ewa Kujawa, dukaisms are "constructed coherently (with few exceptions) and logically [and] fit exactly into the free space that the Polish inflectional system leaves for it".

=== Declension ===
	Pronouns	Adjectives	Proper names
Nominative	onu	ładnu	Słowiński
Genitive	jenu / nu / nienu	ładnu	Słowińskienu
Dative	jewu / wu	ładnu	Słowińskienu
Accusative	jenu / nu / nienu	ładnu	Słowińskienu
Instrumental	num	ładnum	Słowińskum
Locative	num	ładnum	Słowińskum
Vocative	–	ładnu	Słowiński

=== Conjugation ===
	Past tense	Future tense Imperfective	Subjunctive
1 pers.	(z)robiłum	będę robiłu	(z)robiłubym
2 pers.	(z)robiłuś	będziesz robiłu	(z)robiłubyś
3 pers.	(z)robiłu	będzie robiłu	(z)robiłuby

== Use ==
Example of the use of Dukaj's dukaisms in his novel (dukaisms bolded):

– Chciałuś powiedzieć – przerwał nu Zamoyski – powinniśmy byli tam dotrzeć. Samu twierdzisz, że po odcięciu od Plateau nie wiesz nawet, w którą stronę lecimy. Swoją drogą, zastanawiam się, jak to możliwe. Przecież chyba pamiętasz, gdzie celowałuś.

— Jacek Dukaj, Perfect Imperfection

Dukaisms are difficult to translate into some languages, such as English, which do not have grammatical gender.

The first professional use of dukaisms outside of the novel includes the Polish localization of video games Apex Legends (2019) and Bugsnax (2020). In the case of Apex Legend, dukaisms were used for the character Bloodhound. In the case of Bugsnax, translator Ola Lubińska decided to use them in the context of the non-binary creature Floofty. Dukaisms were also used for the Polish subtitles of the documentary Seahorse (2019) and in the translation of the comic Gender Queer (2019, Polish edition 2021).

They are also used in the Polish translation of the Martha Wells' Murderbot Diaries series. The title character and narrator, who is a genderless construct of man and machine, uses a neuter form, but another character in that novel, whose gender is non-binary, uses dukaisms.
