= Onu (surname) =

Onu is a surname. Notable people with the surname include:

- EJ Onu (born 1999), American basketball power forward and center
- Ogbonnaya Onu (1951–2024), Nigerian politician and author
- Peter Onu, Nigerian diplomat and philanthropist
- Sylvester Umaru Onu (1938–2020), Nigerian judge
