= European Language Council =

The European Language Council is a permanent and independent association whose main aim is the quantitative and qualitative improvement of knowledge of the languages and cultures of the European Union and beyond. Membership is open to all institutions of higher education and all national and international associations with a special interest in languages.

The association's permanent secretariat is at Freie Universität in Berlin, Germany.
