= Perfect Imperfection (novel) =

2004 novel by Jacek Dukaj

Perfekcyjna niedoskonałość. Pierwsza tercja Progresu
- Polish edition cover.
- Author: Jacek Dukaj
- Original title: Perfekcyjna niedoskonałość. Pierwsza tercja Progresu
- Translator: not translated
- Cover artist: Tomasz Bagiński
- Language: Polish
- Genre: hard science fiction
- Publisher: Wydawnictwo Literackie
- Publication date: 2004
- Publication place: Poland
- Pages: 456
- ISBN: 83-08-03647-3
- OCLC: 60361233
- LC Class: PG7163.U4 P47 2004

Perfect Imperfection: First third of progress (Polish: Perfekcyjna niedoskonałość. Pierwsza tercja progresu; also sometimes translated as "Ideal Imperfection") is a science fiction novel published in 2004 by the Polish science fiction writer Jacek Dukaj, ostensibly as the first part of a planned trilogy (no other parts have been published, nor announced as under development). It was published in Poland by Wydawnictwo Literackie.

The novel received the prime Polish award for science-fiction literature, Janusz A. Zajdel Award, in 2004. It was translated to Russian in 2019.

The book was positively received by critics, although some noted that it thematically resembles the author's older works, likely because it was written several years before it was published. Its unique language, including "posthuman grammar", has received a number of scholarly interpretations.

== Plot ==
A 21st-century astronaut, Adam Zamoyski, is recovering after an accident. At first, he thinks that he is recovering from a plane crash, and any bizarre things he perceives are hallucinations due to his convalescence. He soon finds out that to prevent him from suffering a culture shock—or perhaps what would be better described as a profound future shock—all information he receives is filtered through an implant, creating a semi-VR world, and in fact he was revived in the 29th century, in a post-technological singularity world. However, his implant becomes damaged, and he finds himself in a world where normal Homo sapiens are just relics. Most of the individuals he meets are artificial intelligence agents, scarcity has been eliminated through nanotechnology, virtual reality is merged with 'reality', the currency is exotic matter used in spacetime experiments—and suddenly Adam is caught in the web of a trans-galactic intrigue spin-doctored by beings vastly more intelligent than an unaugmented human. What is the secret that he presumably learned before his spaceship was destroyed back in the 21st century? The secret that he cannot remember, and that the science of the 29th century cannot restore, despite having resurrected him? And in a world where whole universes are dedicated to the sole purpose of serving as the weapon laboratories for the arms race between multiversal civilizations, can a normal human become anything more than a toy of inconceivably intelligent beings?

== The universe ==
As with all of Dukaj's novels, the world of Perfect Imperfection is teeming with various concepts and ideas.

=== Remy's curve ===
The diagram (Remy's curve) shows the development of humanity in Perfect Imperfection. The vertical axis represents intelligence, the horizontal, adaptation, with the two points indicating physics and meta-physics. Translation of terms: * zwierzęta – animals * stahsowie – STAHS, Standard Homo sapiens * phoebe'owie – PHB's, Post-Human Beings * inkluzje – inclusions * Komputer Ostateczny – Ultimate Computer * Inkluzja Ultymatywna – Ultimate Inclusion * plateau – the ultimate communication network

Remy's curve, which shows the course of the humanity evolution, is one of the most fundamental concepts in Perfect Imperfection. Dukaj used concepts of anthropic principle, technological singularity and transhumanism to propose a division of intelligence along the lines of intelligence and adaptation:

- Standard Homo Sapiens are normal humans
- Post-Human Beings is the next level of the evolution of human beings. Supported by artificial intelligence, one of the characteristics of a phoebe is its ability to divide itself into many copies with various levels, tasks and levels of autonomy, each of which can be tasked with analyzing and dealing with parts of reality. Another characteristic is the ability to transform both their bodies and minds.
- Ultimate Computer is the computer using the best hardware as allowed by the physical constants of our universe. See also physics of computation.
- Inclusions are in essence 'pocket universes'. They are created for specific entities to run hardware in a dedicated universe with physical constants different from ours, allowing for better performance than those in our universe
- Ultimate Inclusion is the inclusion with the best possible set of physical constants in the entire multiverse

The curve illustrates the relationship between intelligence (vertical axis) and adaptation (horizontal axis), where adaptation means the ability to use for one's own purposes the resources of the universe. It starts with animals and ends with the optimal form, the Ultimate Inclusion, able to utilize most efficiently all resources of the universe, both by perfecting their use of the resources and by adapting their form to the most efficient in their use. Named after the fictional scientist, Remy, this curve is supposed to be universal for all intelligent species throughout the multiverse.

The adaptation axis is divided by two points (thresholds) into three-thirds. The first third is the natural evolution. The first point, Autocreation or Physics, divides naturally evolved entities from those using technology to further evolution, but technology still limited by the physics of one universe. The second point, Meta-physical (it should be stressed – not metaphysical), divides them from logical inclusions, which use the 'better' physics of other universes to improve themselves. Note that Dukaj defines metaphysics as the science of changing physics (physical constants).

One of the conclusions of Remy's theory is the Convergence Principle. After several centuries of evolution on second and third thirds, there is relatively little difference between various civilizations. Even if they have originated in different universes, each has spawned many subtypes, as alien to itself as any of those created by others, and in fact when they are approaching the Ultimate Inclusion they become more and more alike. First contact may be shocking and daunting for young civilizations, but for old ones, it is just a daily occurrence, with newly encountered races being no more surprising than the new youth fashion civilization seen a few years back.

Many concepts important for stahs are mostly irrelevant for phoebes (like gender) or inclusions (like age). Stahs are nonetheless preserved, allowed to live their lives and change into phoebes or inclusions at will, as due to elimination of scarcity and the ability to create new universes, there is no competition for resources (at least, for such as may be used by stahs).

=== Craft ===
Craft (or kraft) is the practice of meta-physics, the science of changing the physical constants, or shaping of spacetime through changing the laws of physics themselves.

== Analysis ==
Dukaj himself wrote that he set out to write "a space opera to end all space operas", but for this he had to create a scientifically plausible and challenging universe, thus creating a hard science fiction novel.

One of many original twists in the book is the new language, such as new grammar and prefixes that try to describe the posthuman beings (somewhat resembling the concept of gender-neutral language). It has since entered Polish language as dukaisms. This language play also makes the book especially challenging for translators. (The book's translation to Russian was nominated for a Russian award for best translations).

Gerard Ronge analyzed the philosophical message of the book, concluding that the novel "proposes a complete philosophical model of possible ways of imagining the future which is unique, yet fully coherent with the Enlightenment paradigm".

Despite being published in 2004, the book was mostly written in 1998–2000, and as several reviewers noted, it bears resemblances to an earlier style of Dukaj.

== Reception ==
The novel received the prime Polish award for science-fiction literature, Janusz A. Zajdel Award, in 2004.

In 2004 Wojciech Orliński reviewed the book for Gazeta Wyborcza. He observes that the book, like many of Dukaj's works, tackles a dimension of metaphysics - a world where evolved humanity, or post humanity, can reshape the very laws of physics themselves. In the end, however, he notes that one constant is the same - fallibility and incompetence of politicians, which provides much of the plot for the book. Writing for Gazeta Wyborcza-affiliated gazeta.pl portal, Michał Olszewski noted that the book confirms that Dukaj is one of contemporary Poland's best authors, but also the book is challenging, mixing various genres, sciences and philosophies, even theology. The portrayed world is very complex, and one of the dimensions that makes it so is that the protagonist is suffering from an identity crisis, as part of his evolution from human to a post-human being.

Reviewing the book for Esensja, also in 2004, Grzegorz Rogaczewski notes that while ostensibly a space opera, the work mixes elements of other genres, from hard science fiction, to fantasy, cloak and dagger, grotesque, supernatural and philosophical fiction. He also notes that the work seems to resemble some earlier works of Dukaj, heavy with many scientific references, and as such may be somewhat more difficult for general readers, not familiar with science fiction. He nonetheless concludes the book is enjoyable and "unforgettable".

Paweł Dunin-Wąsowicz writing for Przekrój in 2004 noted that the book will likely amaze any readers unfamiliar with Dukaj's works, but those familiar with them may notice repetition of some topics presented in Extensa and Other Songs, and as such the book is somewhat of a "step back" in the context of Dukaj's literary development, something explainable as this was an older manuscript that was published several years after being finished.

In 2015 Michał Sowiński reviewed the book for Tygodnik Powszechny, calling Dukaj a genius writer, allowing us "a glimpse at the other side of language and understanding". He noted that the book, described as first of the promised trilogy, remains unfinished, which nonetheless fits its title and theme.
