= Polish Language Council =

Regulation of the Polish language

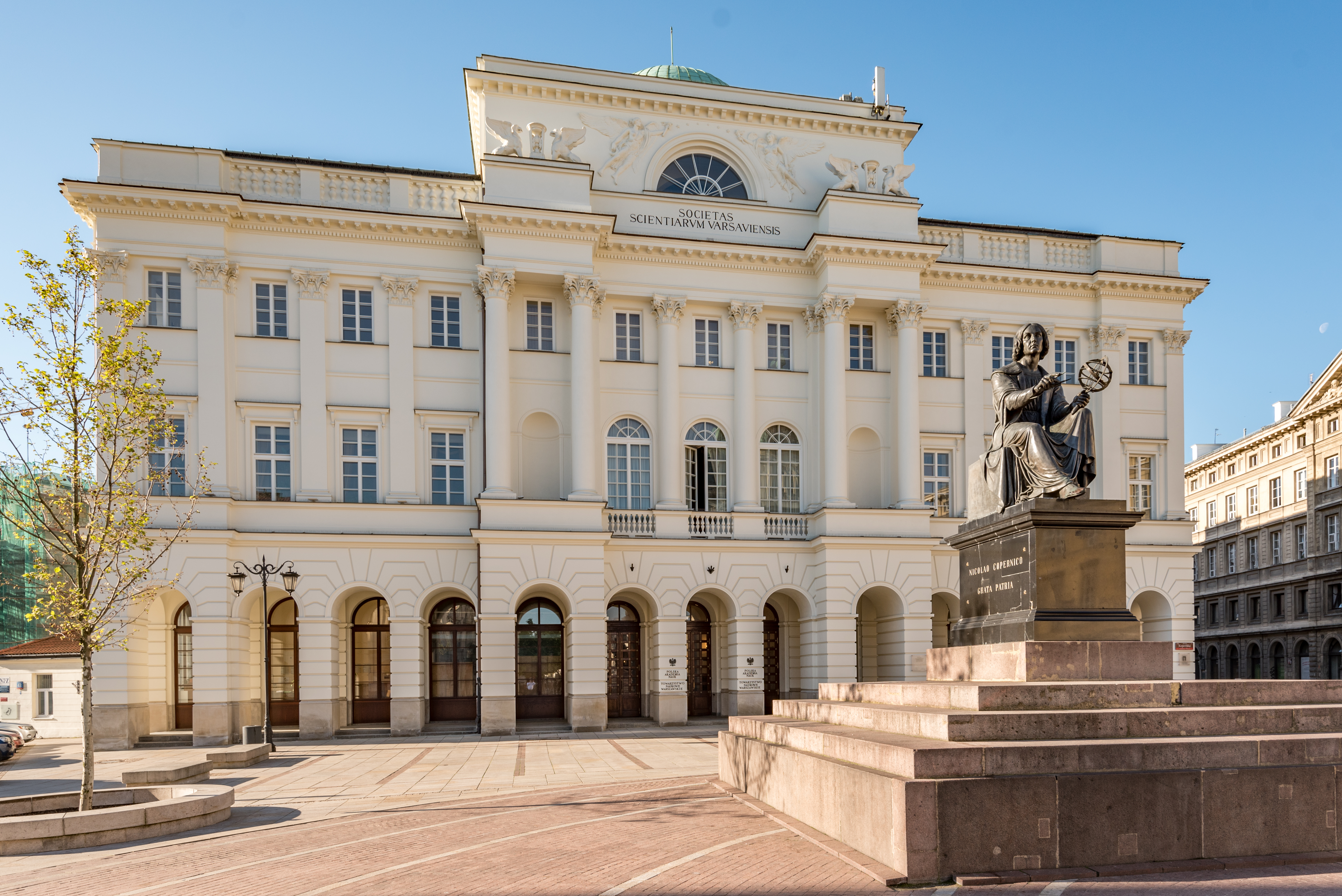
The seat of the council is located at Staszic Palace

The Council for the Polish Language (Polish: Rada Języka Polskiego) is the official language regulating organ of Polish. It was established by the Presidium of the Polish Academy of Sciences pursuant to Resolution No. 17/96 of 9 September 1996.

== Organization ==
The council is composed of 36 members, including linguists, scientists, other specialists (e.g., in law, history of art, computer science, medicine, physics). It is tasked with advisory duties.

The council’s activities are outlined in the Polish Language Act (Polish: "Ustawa o języku polskim") of 1999.

The stated tasks of the council are:

- analysis and evaluation of the condition of Polish and advising on the state language policy;
- promoting knowledge about Polish, its variations, standards, and the criteria for evaluation of its usage; organization of discussions and conferences to this aim;
- making decisions on disputes over elements of the language (vocabulary, grammar, spelling, punctuation, and syntax);
- establishing rules for spelling and punctuation;
- finding solutions for usage of Polish in science and technology (primarily in emerging disciplines);
- evaluation of the names for new commercial products and services;
- taking care of the language culture in Polish-language schools;
- expressing views on non-standardized given names for children;
- review of texts published by the Polish media and public administration.

== Notable members ==
Among the most notable current members of the council are:

- Jerzy Bartmiński
- Andrzej Blikle
- Jerzy Bralczyk
- Andrzej Markowski
- Jan Miodek
