= Taniec z gwiazdami season 28 =

Polish TV show

Taniec z gwiazdami
- Season 28
- Hosted by: Krzysztof Ibisz; Paulina Sykut-Jeżyna
- Judges: Rafał Maserak; Ewa Kasprzyk; Tomasz Wygoda; Iwona Pavlović
- Celebrity winner: Vanessa Aleksander
- Professional winner: Michał Bartkiewicz
- No. of episodes: 10

Release
- Original network: Polsat
- Original release: 15 September – 17 November 2024

Season chronology
- ← Previous; Season 27 Next → Season 29

The 28th season of Taniec z gwiazdami, the Polish edition of Dancing with the Stars, began on 15 September 2024. It’s the fifteenth season aired on Polsat. Iwona Pavlović, Rafał Maserak, Ewa Kasprzyk and Tomasz Wygoda returned as judges. Krzysztof Ibisz and Paulina Sykut-Jeżyna reprised their role as hosts.

Michał Bartkiewicz, Michał Danilczuk, Sara Janicka, Jacek Jeschke, Michał Kassin, Izabela Skierska, Julia Suryś, Daria Syta and Hanna Żudziewicz returned to the series as a pro and Wojciech Kucina, Klaudia Rąba and Marcin Zaprawa joined the pros.

On 17 November, Vanessa Aleksander and her partner Michał Bartkiewicz were crowned the champions.

== Couples ==
Celebrity	Notability	Professional partner	Status	Source(s)
Olga Bończyk	Actress and singer	Marcin Zaprawa	Eliminated 1st on 22 September 2024	
Michał Meyer	Film and television actor	Klaudia Rąba	Eliminated 2nd on 29 September 2024	
Piotr Świerczewski	Former Poland footballer	Izabela Skierska	Eliminated 3rd on 6 October 2024	
Natalia Nykiel	Singer-songwriter & The Voice of Poland finalist	Jacek Jeschke	Eliminated 4th on 6 October 2024	
Filip Lato	Singer and The Voice of Poland semi-finalist	Julia Suryś	Eliminated 5th on 20 October 2024	
Anna-Maria Sieklucka	365 dni actress	Michał Kassin	Eliminated 6th on 20 October 2024	
Rafał Zawierucha	Film and television actor	Daria Syta	Eliminated 7th on 27 October 2024	
Filip Bobek	Film & television actor	Hanna Żudziewicz	Eliminated 8th on 3 November 2024	
Majka Jeżowska	Singer-songwriter	Michał Danilczuk	Eliminated 9th on 10 November 2024	
Maciej Zakościelny	Film & television actor	Sara Janicka	Third place on 17 November 2024	
Julia Żugaj	Singer	Wojciech Kucina	Runners-up on 17 November 2024	
Vanessa Aleksander	Film & television actress	Michał Bartkiewicz	Winners on 17 November 2024	

== Scores ==
Couple	Place	1	2	1+2	3	4	5	6	5+6	7	8	9	10
Vanessa & Michał	1	40†	34†	74†	33	37	40†	40+2=42†	82†	40+35=75	37+40=77	40+40=80†	40+40+40=120†
Julia & Wojciech	2	38	30	68	36	37	34	36+3=39	73	38+40=78†	40+38=78†	36+39=75	39+37+40=116‡
Maciej & Sara	3	31	30	61	34	40†	40†	32+2=34	74	33+40=73	35+32=67‡	38+40=78	40+38+40=118
Majka & Michał	4	34	24	58	20	30	37	33+1=34	71	32+34=66	30+37=67‡	35+34=69‡	
Filip & Hanna	5	38	27	65	37†	31	30‡	40+2=42†	72	34+40=74	40+31=71		
Rafał & Daria	6	32	25	57	37†	34	40†	34+2=36	76	29+27=56‡			
Anna-Maria & Michał	7	27‡	27	54	33	38	32	27+3=30‡	62‡				
Filip & Julia	8	31	32	63	31	31	38	30+1=31	69				
Natalia & Jacek	9	30	25	55	25	24							
Piotr & Izabela	10	32	19‡	51‡	28	23‡							
Michał & Klaudia	11	31	20	51‡	18‡								
Olga & Marcin	12	29	23	52									

Red numbers indicate the lowest score for each week.
Green numbers indicate the highest score for each week.
indicates the couple eliminated that week.
indicates the couple that was eliminated but later returned to the competition.
indicates the returning couple that finished in the bottom two or three.
indicates the winning couple.
indicates the runner-up.
indicates the couple in third place.

== Average score chart ==
This table only counts for dances scored on a 40-points scale.

Rank by average	Place	Couple	Total points	Number of dances	Average
1	1	Vanessa & Michał	576	15	38.4
2	2	Julia & Wojciech	558	15	37.2
3	3	Maciej & Sara	543	15	36.2
4	5	Filip & Hanna	348	10	34.8
5	6	Rafał & Daria	258	8	32.3
6	8	Filip & Julia	193	6	32.2
7	4	Majka & Michał	380	12	31.7
8	7	Anna-Maria & Michał	184	6	30.7
9	9	Natalia & Jacek	104	4	26.0
9	12	Olga & Marcin	52	2	26.0
11	10	Piotr & Izabela	102	4	25.5
12	11	Michał & Klaudia	69	3	23.0

== Highest and lowest scoring performances ==
The best and worst performances in each dance according to the judges' 40-point scale:

Dance	Best dancer(s)	Highest score	Worst dancer(s)	Lowest score
Jive	Julia Żugaj	39	Anna-Maria Sieklucka	27
Tango	Filip Bobek	37	Majka Jeżowska	24
Viennese Waltz	Filip Bobek; Vanessa Aleksander	40	Olga Bończyk	23
Waltz	Julia Żugaj	40	Maciej Zakościelny	31
Cha-cha-cha	Vanessa Aleksander	40	Piotr Świerczewski	19
Paso Doble	Vanessa Aleksander	40	Filip Bobek	27
Rumba	Rafał Zawierucha; Vanessa Aleksander; Julia Żugaj; Maciej Zakościelny	40	Piotr Świerczewski	23
Quickstep	Filip Bobek; Vanessa Aleksander	40	Anna-Maria Sieklucka	27
Country	Majka Jeżowska	20		
Argentine Tango	Vanessa Aleksander; Maciej Zakościelny	40	Michał Meyer	18
Salsa	Vanessa Aleksander	40	Natalia Nykiel	25
Charleston	Julia Żugaj	38	Filip Lato	31
K-pop	Julia Żugaj	36		
Samba	Julia Żugaj	37	Vanessa Aleksander; Maciej Zakościelny	33
Bollywood	Rafał Zawierucha	37		
Contemporary	Maciej Zakościelny	40	Majka Jeżowska	37
Hip-hop	Maciej Zakościelny	40		
Foxtrot	Filip Bobek; Vanessa Aleksander	40	Majka Jeżowska	33
Freestyle	Vanessa Aleksander; Julia Żugaj; Maciej Zakościelny	40		

== Couples' highest and lowest scoring dances ==
According to the 40-point scale:

Couples	Highest scoring dance(s)	Lowest scoring dance(s)
Vanessa & Michał	Paso Doble (twice), Cha-cha-cha, Rumba, Viennese Waltz, Argentine Tango, Salsa, Foxtrot, Quickstep, Freestyle (40)	Samba (33)
Julia & Wojciech	Waltz, Rumba, Freestyle (40)	Viennese Waltz (30)
Maciej & Sara	Argentine Tango (twice), Hip-hop, Contemporary, Rumba, Freestyle (40)	Jive (30)
Majka & Michał	Salsa, Contemporary (37)	Country (20)
Filip & Hanna	Viennese Waltz, Quickstep, Foxtrot (40)	Paso Doble (27)
Rafał & Daria	Rumba (40)	Viennese Waltz (25)
Filip & Julia	Viennese Waltz (38)	Paso Doble (30)
Anna-Maria & Michał	Contemporary (38)	Cha-cha-cha, Quickstep, Jive (27)
Natalia & Jacek	Tango (30)	Cha-cha-cha (24)
Piotr & Izabela	Viennese Waltz (32)	Cha-cha-cha (19)
Michał & Klaudia	Viennese Waltz (31)	Argentine Tango (18)
Olga & Marcin	Rumba (29)	Viennese Waltz (23)

== Weekly scores ==
Unless indicated otherwise, individual judges scores in the charts below (given in parentheses) are listed in this order from left to right: Rafał Maserak, Ewa Kasprzyk, Tomasz Wygoda, Iwona Pavlović.

=== Week 1: Season Premiere ===
Running order

Couple	Score	Dance	Music
Filip & Julia	31 (8,9,8,6)	Jive	"Shake It Off"—Taylor Swift
Natalia & Jacek	30 (8,9,6,7)	Tango	"To tylko tango"—Maanam
Michał & Klaudia	31 (8,10,6,7)	Viennese Waltz	"What's a Woman"—Vaya Con Dios
Julia & Wojciech	38 (9,10,9,10)	Jive	"Tańcz głupia"—Margaret
Filip & Hanna	38 (10,10,9,9)	Waltz	"Three Times a Lady"—Commodores
Anna-Maria & Michał	27 (7,9,6,5)	Cha-cha-cha	"Stronger (What Doesn't Kill You)"—Kelly Clarkson
Piotr & Izabela	32 (8,9,8,7)	Viennese Waltz	"Drań"—Agnieszka Chylińska
Vanessa & Michał	40 (10,10,10,10)	Paso Doble	"España cañí"—André Rieu
Olga & Marcin	29 (8,9,6,6)	Rumba	"Szukaj mnie"—Edyta Geppert
Rafał & Daria	32 (8,10,7,7)	Tango	"Sarà perché ti amo"—Ricchi e Poveri
Majka & Michał	34 (9,9,8,8)	Cha-cha-cha	"Sex Bomb"—Tom Jones
Maciej & Sara	31 (7,10,7,7)	Waltz	"Always Remember Us This Way"—Lady Gaga

=== Week 2: Grand Ball ===
Running order

Couple	Score	Dance	Music	Result
Anna-Maria & Michał	27 (6,8,7,6)	Quickstep	"Night Owls"—Vaya Con Dios	Safe
Piotr & Izabela	19 (5,7,4,3)	Cha-cha-cha	"Ale jazz!"—Sanah & Vito Bambino	Safe
Filip & Hanna	27 (6,8,6,7)	Paso Doble	"Bring Me to Life"—Evanescence	Safe
Rafał & Daria	25 (6,9,6,4)	Viennese Waltz	"Voilà"—Barbara Pravi	Safe
Olga & Marcin	23 (6,7,5,5)	Viennese Waltz	"Embarras"—Irena Santor	Eliminated
Natalia & Jacek	25 (6,7,6,6)	Rumba	"I'm Not the Only One"—Sam Smith	Safe
Maciej & Sara	30 (7,9,7,7)	Jive	"Locked Out of Heaven"—Bruno Mars	Safe
Majka & Michał	24 (7,8,6,3)	Tango	"Rumour Has It"—Adele	Safe
Filip & Julia	32 (8,8,8,8)	Waltz	"I Wonder Why"—Curtis Stigers	Safe
Michał & Klaudia	20 (5,6,5,4)	Cha-cha-cha	"Café de Paris"—Dawid Kwiatkowski	Bottom two
Julia & Wojciech	30 (8,9,7,6)	Viennese Waltz	"Moje jedyne marzenie"—Anna Jantar	Safe
Vanessa & Michał	34 (9,9,8,8)	Quickstep	"Monday Morning"—Melanie Fiona	Safe

=== Week 3: Around the World ===
Running order

Couple	Score	Dance	Country	Music	Result
Majka & Michał	20 (5,6,5,4)	Country	USA	"Texas Hold 'Em"—Beyoncé	Safe
Michał & Klaudia	18 (5,6,4,3)	Argentine Tango	Argentina	"Santa María (Del Buen Ayre)"—Gotan Project	Eliminated
Natalia & Jacek	25 (6,7,6,6)	Salsa	Colombia	"La Tortura"—Shakira feat. Alejandro Sanz	Safe
Filip & Julia	31 (7,9,8,7)	Charleston	Italy	"We No Speak Americano"—Yolanda Be Cool & DCUP	Safe
Julia & Wojciech	36 (9,10,8,9)	K-pop	South Korea	"Dynamite"—BTS	Safe
Filip & Hanna	37 (9,10,9,9)	Tango	France	"Et si tu n'existais pas"—Joe Dassin	Safe
Vanessa & Michał	33 (8,9,8,8)	Samba	Turkey	"Şımarık"—Tarkan	Safe
Rafał & Daria	37 (9,10,9,9)	Bollywood	India	"Jai Ho! (You Are My Destiny)"—The Pussycat Dolls	Safe
Piotr & Izabela	28 (7,9,6,6)	Quickstep	Czech Republic	"Jožin z bažin"—Ivan Mládek	Bottom two
Maciej & Sara	34 (8,9,9,8)	Cha-cha-cha	Cuba	"Havana"—Camila Cabello	Safe
Anna-Maria & Michał	33 (9,9,8,7)	Viennese Waltz	Poland	"Powrócisz tu"—Irena Santor	Safe

=== Week 4: Faces of Dance ===
Running order

Couple	Score	Dance	Music	Result
Natalia & Jacek	24 (6,8,6,4)	Cha-cha-cha	"Flowers"—Miley Cyrus	Bottom three
Piotr & Izabela	23 (6,8,5,4)	Rumba	"True Colors"—Cyndi Lauper	Eliminated
Vanessa & Michał	37 (9,10,9,9)	Waltz	"If I Ain't Got You"—Alicia Keys	Safe
Maciej & Sara	40 (10,10,10,10)	Argentine Tango	"El Choclo"—Ángel Villoldo	Safe
Anna-Maria & Michał	38 (10,10,9,9)	Contemporary	"What Was I Made For?"—Billie Eilish	Safe
Rafał & Daria	34 (8,10,8,8)	Quickstep	"Forgive Me Friend"—Smith & Thell	Bottom three
Filip & Hanna	31 (7,8,8,8)	Jive	"Wolne duchy"—Męskie Granie Orkiestra	Safe
Filip & Julia	31 (8,9,7,7)	Rumba	"Shallow"—Lady Gaga & Bradley Cooper	Safe
Majka & Michał	30 (7,10,7,6)	Viennese Waltz	"Can I Call You Rose?"—Thee Sacred Souls	Safe
Julia & Wojciech	37 (9,10,9,9)	Samba	"24K Magic"—Bruno Mars	Safe

Dance-off performances

Couple	Dance	Music	Result
Natalia & Jacek	Cha-cha-cha	"Sunshine Day"—Osibisa	Eliminated
Rafał & Daria	Quickstep	"Monday Morning"—Melanie Fiona	Safe

Judges' votes to save

- Maserak: Rafał & Daria
- Kasprzyk: Natalia & Jacek
- Wygoda: Rafał & Daria
- Pavlović: Natalia & Jacek

Draw. By the decision of Iwona Pavlović, the head of the jury, they moved on Rafał & Daria.

=== Week 5: Trio Challenge ===
Running order

Couple	Score	Dance	Music
Filip & Hanna (Maja Makowska)	30 (8,8,7,7)	Cha-cha-cha	"Don't Start Now"—Dua Lipa
Anna-Maria & Michał (Piotr Sieklucki)	32 (8,9,8,7)	Waltz	"Without You"—Mariah Carey
Maciej & Sara (Filip Zakościelny)	40 (10,10,10,10)	Hip-hop	"U Can't Touch This"—MC Hammer
Filip & Julia (Teresa Lato)	38 (10,10,9,9)	Viennese Waltz	"Wspomnienie"—Czesław Niemen
Julia & Wojciech (Sonia Żugaj)	34 (9,9,8,8)	Salsa	"Dancing Queen"—ABBA
Rafał & Daria (Beata Wiśnicka-Zawierucha)	40 (10,10,10,10)	Rumba	"Madison"—Kaśka Sochacka
Vanessa & Michał (Renata Aleksander)	40 (10,10,10,10)	Cha-cha-cha	"Oh, Pretty Woman"—Roy Orbison
Majka & Michał (Wojciech Jeżowski)	37 (9,10,9,9)	Salsa	"A ja wolę moją mamę"—Majka Jeżowska

=== Week 6: Rock Week ===
Running order

Couple	Score	Dance	Music	Result
Maciej & Sara	32 (8,9,7,8)	Paso Doble	"By the Way"—Red Hot Chili Peppers	Safe
Rafał & Daria	34 (8,10,8,8)	Jive	"Sex on Fire"—Kings of Leon	Safe
Majka & Michał	33 (9,9,8,7)	Foxtrot	"Mniej niż zero"—Lady Pank	Bottom three
Julia & Wojciech	36 (9,9,9,9)	Tango	"I Wanna Be Your Slave"—Måneskin	Safe
Vanessa & Michał	40 (10,10,10,10)	Rumba	"One"—U2	Safe
Anna-Maria & Michał	27 (7,8,7,5)	Jive	"Szklana pogoda"—Lombard	Eliminated
Filip & Hanna	40 (10,10,10,10)	Viennese Waltz	"Crazy"—Aerosmith	Safe
Filip & Julia	30 (8,8,8,6)	Paso Doble	"It's My Life"—Bon Jovi	Eliminated

Dance-offs
Couple	Judges votes	Dance	Music	Result
Filip L. & Hanna	Anna-Maria, Anna-Maria, Anna-Maria, Filip L.	Rock and Roll	"Płonąca stodoła"—Czesław Niemen	Loser (1 pts)
Anna-Maria & Wojciech	Anna-Maria, Anna-Maria, Anna-Maria, Filip L.	Rock and Roll	"Płonąca stodoła"—Czesław Niemen	Winner (3 pts)
Julia & Michał K.	Julia, Majka, Julia, Julia	Rock and Roll	"Jailhouse Rock"—Elvis Presley	Winner (3 pts)
Majka & Michał	Julia, Majka, Julia, Julia	Rock and Roll	"Jailhouse Rock"—Elvis Presley	Loser (1 pts)
Filip B. & Sara	Filip B., Filip B., Maciej, Maciej	Rock and Roll	"Nie bądź taki szybki Bill"—Katarzyna Sobczyk	Draw (2 pts)
Maciej & Daria	Filip B., Filip B., Maciej, Maciej	Rock and Roll	"Nie bądź taki szybki Bill"—Katarzyna Sobczyk	Draw (2 pts)
Vanessa & Michał B.	Vanessa, Rafał, Vanessa, Rafał	Rock and Roll	"Do You Love Me"—The Contours	Draw (2 pts)
Rafał & Julia	Vanessa, Rafał, Vanessa, Rafał	Rock and Roll	"Do You Love Me"—The Contours	Draw (2 pts)

=== Week 7: Radio Hits ===
Running order

Couple	Score	Dance	Music	Result
Rafał & Daria (Lanberry & Tribbs)	29 (8,8,7,6)	Tango	"Dzięki, że jesteś"—Lanberry & Tribbs	Eliminated
Rafał & Daria (Lanberry & Tribbs)	27 (7,8,6,6)	Cha-cha-cha	"Woman's World"—Katy Perry	Eliminated
Maciej & Sara (Vixen)	33 (8,9,8,8)	Samba	"Birds of a Feather"—Billie Eilish	Safe
Maciej & Sara (Vixen)	40 (10,10,10,10)	Contemporary	"Ne rozumiju"—Vixen	Safe
Filip & Hanna (Marta Bijan)	34 (9,8,8,9)	Rumba	"Cud"—EMO feat. Marta Bijan	Bottom two
Filip & Hanna (Marta Bijan)	40 (10,10,10,10)	Quickstep	"Why Why Why"—Shawn Mendes	Bottom two
Vanessa & Michał (Margaret)	40 (10,10,10,10)	Viennese Waltz	"Die with a Smile"—Bruno Mars & Lady Gaga	Safe
Vanessa & Michał (Margaret)	35 (9,9,9,8)	Jive	"Miłego lata"—Margaret	Safe
Julia & Wojciech (Oskar Cyms)	38 (10,10,9,9)	Cha-cha-cha	"Nie musisz się bać"—Oskar Cyms	Safe
Julia & Wojciech (Oskar Cyms)	40 (10,10,10,10)	Waltz	"Consequences"—Camila Cabello	Safe
Majka & Michał (Dawid Kwiatkowski)	32 (8,9,8,7)	Rumba	"Bad Dreams"—Teddy Swims	Safe
Majka & Michał (Dawid Kwiatkowski)	34 (9,9,9,7)	Tango	"Beze mnie"—Dawid Kwiatkowski	Safe

=== Week 8: Halloween Week ===
Running order

Couple	Score	Dance	Music	Result
Vanessa & Michał (Maciej Musiał)	37 (9,10,9,9)	Cha-cha-cha	"Thriller"—Michael Jackson	Safe
Vanessa & Michał (Maciej Musiał)	40 (10,10,10,10)	Argentine Tango	"El Tango de Roxanne"—from Moulin Rouge!	Safe
Filip & Hanna (Sandra Kubicka)	40 (10,10,10,10)	Foxtrot	"The Addams Family Theme"—Vic Mizzy	Eliminated
Filip & Hanna (Sandra Kubicka)	31 (8,10,7,6)	Cha-cha-cha	"Było, minęło"—Sanah	Eliminated
Majka & Michał (Julia Kuczyńska)	30 (8,9,7,6)	Paso Doble	"Bloody Mary"—Lady Gaga	Bottom two
Majka & Michał (Julia Kuczyńska)	37 (10,10,9,8)	Contemporary	"People Help the People"—Birdy	Bottom two
Julia & Wojciech (Faustyna Fugińska)	40 (10,10,10,10)	Rumba	"Falling"—Julee Cruise	Safe
Julia & Wojciech (Faustyna Fugińska)	38 (10,10,9,9)	Charleston	"Złamane serce jest OK"—Daria Zawiałow	Safe
Maciej & Sara (Magdalena Różczka)	35 (10,10,8,7)	Cha-cha-cha	"Ghostbusters"—Ray Parker Jr.	Safe
Maciej & Sara (Magdalena Różczka)	32 (9,9,7,7)	Viennese Waltz	"Nic dwa razy"—Sanah	Safe

=== Week 9: Movie Week (Semi-Final) ===
Individual judges scores in the charts below (given in parentheses) are listed in this order from left to right: Rafał Maserak, Małgorzata Socha, Tomasz Wygoda, Iwona Pavlović.

Running order

Couple	Score	Dance	Music	Movie	Result
Julia & Wojciech	36 (9,10,8,9)	Paso Doble	"Running Up That Hill"—Kate Bush	Stranger Things	Safe
Julia & Wojciech	39 (10,10,10,9)	Foxtrot	"Wspaniały świat"—Marcin Franc & Natalia Piotrowska-Paciorek	Aladdin	Safe
Majka & Michał	35 (9,10,8,8)	Waltz	"Dumka na dwa serca"—Edyta Górniak & Mieczysław Szcześniak	With Fire and Sword	Bottom two
Majka & Michał	34 (10,10,7,7)	Jive	"I'll Be There for You"—The Rembrandts	Friends	Bottom two
Maciej & Sara	38 (9,10,9,10)	Quickstep	"Mrs. Robinson"—Simon & Garfunkel	The Graduate	Safe
Maciej & Sara	40 (10,10,10,10)	Rumba	"Ain't No Sunshine"—Bill Withers	Notting Hill	Safe
Vanessa & Michał	40 (10,10,10,10)	Salsa	"Cambio Dolor"—Natalia Oreiro	Muñeca brava	Bottom two
Vanessa & Michał	40 (10,10,10,10)	Foxtrot	"Love and Marriage"—Frank Sinatra	Married... with Children	Bottom two

Dance-off performances

Couple	Dance	Music	Result
Vanessa & Michał	Viennese Waltz	"Hold My Hand"—Lady Gaga	Safe
Majka & Michał	Viennese Waltz	"Hold My Hand"—Lady Gaga	Eliminated

=== Week 10: Season Final ===
Running order

Couple	Score	Dance	Music	Result
Maciej & Sara	40 (10,10,10,10)	Argentine Tango	"El Choclo"—Ángel Villoldo	3rd place
Maciej & Sara	38 (10,10,9,9)	Jive	"Locked Out of Heaven"—Bruno Mars	3rd place
Maciej & Sara	40 (10,10,10,10)	Freestyle	"Fragile"—Sting	3rd place
Vanessa & Michał	40 (10,10,10,10)	Paso Doble	"España cañí"—André Rieu	Winners
Vanessa & Michał	40 (10,10,10,10)	Quickstep	"Monday Morning"—Melanie Fiona	Winners
Vanessa & Michał	40 (10,10,10,10)	Freestyle	''To Build a Home'' — The Cinematic Orchestra	Winners
Julia & Wojciech	39 (10,10,9,10)	Jive	"Tańcz głupia"—Margaret	Runners-up
Julia & Wojciech	37 (9,10,10,8)	Viennese Waltz	"Moje jedyne marzenie"—Anna Jantar	Runners-up
Julia & Wojciech	40 (10,10,10,10)	Freestyle	''Hallelujah''—Leonard Cohen	Runners-up

Other Dances

Couple	Dance	Music
Majka & Michał	Foxtrot	''L-O-V-E''—Nat King Cole
Filip & Hanna	Foxtrot	''L-O-V-E''—Nat King Cole
Rafał & Daria	Foxtrot	''L-O-V-E''—Nat King Cole
Anna-Maria & Michał	Foxtrot	''L-O-V-E''—Nat King Cole
Filip & Julia	Foxtrot	''L-O-V-E''—Nat King Cole
Natalia & Jacek	Foxtrot	''L-O-V-E''—Nat King Cole
Piotr & Izabela	Foxtrot	''L-O-V-E''—Nat King Cole
Michał & Klaudia	Foxtrot	''L-O-V-E''—Nat King Cole
Olga & Marcin	Foxtrot	''L-O-V-E''—Nat King Cole

== Dance chart ==
The celebrities and professional partners danced one of these routines for each corresponding week:

- Week 1 (Season Premiere): Jive, Tango, Viennese Waltz, Waltz, Cha-cha-cha, Paso Doble, Rumba
- Week 2 (Grand Ball): One unlearned dance (introducing Quickstep)
- Week 3 (Around the World): One unlearned dance (introducing Country, Argentine Tango, Salsa, Charleston, K-pop, Samba, Bollywood)
- Week 4 (Faces of Dance): One unlearned dance (introducing Contemporary)
- Week 5 (Trio Challenge): One unlearned dance (introducing Hip-hop)
- Week 6 (Rock Week): One unlearned dance (introducing Foxtrot) and Rock and Roll dance-offs
- Week 7 (Radio Hits): Two unlearned dances
  Rafał & Daria and Majka & Michał: One unlearned dance and one repeated dance
- Week 8 (Halloween Week): One unlearned dance and one repeated dance
  Julia & Wojciech and Majka & Michał: Two unlearned dances
- Week 9 (Semi-Final: Movie Week): Two unlearned dances
- Week 10 (Season Final): Couple's favourite dance of the season, judge's choice (Week 2) and Freestyle

Couple	1	2	3	4	5	6		7		8		9		10		
Vanessa & Michał	Paso Doble	Quickstep	Samba	Waltz	Cha-cha-cha	Rumba	Rock and Roll	Viennese Waltz	Jive	Cha-cha-cha	Argentine Tango	Salsa	Foxtrot	Paso Doble	Quickstep	Freestyle
Julia & Wojciech	Jive	Viennese Waltz	K-pop	Samba	Salsa	Tango	Rock and Roll	Cha-cha-cha	Waltz	Rumba	Charleston	Paso Doble	Foxtrot	Jive	Viennese Waltz	Freestyle
Maciej & Sara	Waltz	Jive	Cha-cha-cha	Argentine Tango	Hip-hop	Paso Doble	Rock and Roll	Samba	Contemporary	Cha-cha-cha	Viennese Waltz	Quickstep	Rumba	Argentine Tango	Jive	Freestyle
Majka & Michał	Cha-cha-cha	Tango	Country	Viennese Waltz	Salsa	Foxtrot	Rock and Roll	Rumba	Tango	Paso Doble	Contemporary	Waltz	Jive			Foxtrot
Filip & Hanna	Waltz	Paso Doble	Tango	Jive	Cha-cha-cha	Viennese Waltz	Rock and Roll	Rumba	Quickstep	Foxtrot	Cha-cha-cha					Foxtrot
Rafał & Daria	Tango	Viennese Waltz	Bollywood	Quickstep	Rumba	Jive	Rock and Roll	Tango	Cha-cha-cha							Foxtrot
Anna-Maria & Michał	Cha-cha-cha	Quickstep	Viennese Waltz	Contemporary	Waltz	Jive	Rock and Roll									Foxtrot
Filip & Julia	Jive	Waltz	Charleston	Rumba	Viennese Waltz	Paso Doble	Rock and Roll									Foxtrot
Natalia & Jacek	Tango	Rumba	Salsa	Cha-cha-cha												Foxtrot
Piotr & Izabela	Viennese Waltz	Cha-cha-cha	Quickstep	Rumba												Foxtrot
Michał & Klaudia	Viennese Waltz	Cha-cha-cha	Argentine Tango													Foxtrot
Olga & Marcin	Rumba	Viennese Waltz														Foxtrot

Highest scoring dance
Lowest scoring dance
Performed, but not scored
Bonus points
Gained bonus points for winning this dance-off
Gained no bonus points for losing this dance-off

== Guest performances ==
Date	Artist(s)	Song(s)	Dancers
15 September 2024	Tomasz Szymuś's Orchestra	"Le Freak"	NEXT Group
22 September 2024	Tomasz Szymuś's Orchestra	"A Little Party Never Killed Nobody (All We Got)"	NEXT Group
29 September 2024	Tomasz Szymuś's Orchestra	"Bądź gotowy dziś do drogi"	NEXT Group
29 September 2024	Tomasz Szymuś's Orchestra	"Vivir Mi Vida"	Paulina Turska i Ricardo Ramos
6 October 2024	Tomasz Szymuś's Orchestra	"Voodoo Mama"	NEXT Group
13 October 2024	Tomasz Szymuś's Orchestra	"Run"	Lenka Klimentova i Jan Kliment
20 October 2024	Teatr Muzyczny ROMA	"We Will Rock You"	
20 October 2024	Teatr Muzyczny ROMA	"Radio Ga Ga"	
27 October 2024	Dawid Kwiatkowski	"Za rękę"	
3 November 2024	Tomasz Szymuś's Orchestra	"This is Halloween"	NEXT Group
3 November 2024	Natalia Nykiel	"Error"	
10 November 2024	Tomasz Szymuś's Orchestra	"Love Theme from The Godfather", "Eye of the Tiger", "Lady Marmalade", "The Greatest Show"	Janja Lesar, Rafał Maserak & NEXT Group
10 November 2024	Matteo Bocelli	"Caruso"	
17 November 2024	Maryla Rodowicz & Roksana Węgiel	"Damą być"	
17 November 2024	Edyta Górniak	"L-O-V-E"	Eliminated couples
17 November 2024	Blanka	"Asereje (Airplane Mode)", "Solo"	

== Rating figures ==
Date	Episode	Official rating 4+	Share 4+	Official rating 16–49	Share 16–49	Official rating 16–59	Share 16–59
15 September 2024	1						
22 September 2024	2	1 400 000					
29 September 2024	3						
6 October 2024	4						
13 October 2024	5						
20 October 2024	6						
27 October 2024	7						
3 November 2024	8						
10 November 2024	9						
17 November 2024	10	2 110 000					
Average	Fall 2024	1 640 000	13.21%		10.26%		10.24%
