= Polish Legends =

2015 Polish-language science fiction and fantasy short film series

- Genre: Science fiction; Fantasy
- Based on: Sir Twardowski; Wawel Dragon; Basilisk; Baba Yaga
- Developed by: Tomasz Bagiński
- Written by: Błażej Dzikowski; Dominik L. Marzec
- Directed by: Tomasz Bagiński
- Starring: Robert Więckiewicz; Aleksandra Kasprzyk; Kim Kold; Tomasz Włosok; Tomasz Drabek; Piotr Machalica; Paweł Domagała; Katarzyna Pośpiech
- Music by: Atanas Valkov
- Country of origin: Poland
- Original language: Polish
- No. of seasons: 1
- No. of episodes: 5 (list of episodes)

Production
- Executive producer: Katarzyna Fukacz
- Producers: Marcin Dyczak; Anna Iller; Aleksandra Sulej; Jarosław Sawko; Piotr Sikora
- Cinematography: Łukasz Żal (ep. 1–2); Marian Prokop (ep. 3–5)
- Editors: Wojciech Jagiełło; Marta Wiśniewska
- Running time: 9–20 minutes
- Production companies: Allegro; Platige Image

Original release
- Network: YouTube
- Release: December 15, 2015 – December 9, 2016

Polish Legends (Polish: Legendy polskie), also known as Polish Tales, is a Polish-language science fiction and fantasy short film series, produced by Allegro and Platige Image. It was directed by Tomasz Bagiński, and written by Błażej Dzikowski and Dominik L. Marzec. In the production also worked Marcin Kobylecki, Łukasz Alwast, Krzysztof Noworyta, Tobiasz Piątkowski, Jan Pomierny, and Marta Staniszewska. The series include 5 short films, that premiered in 2015 and 2016, on YouTube. It is based on Polish legends and folk tales, including: Sir Twardowski, Wawel Dragon, Basilisk, and Baba Yaga.

== Cast ==
- Robert Więckiewicz as Jan Twardowsky
- Aleksandra Kasprzyk as a devil woman
- Kim Kold as Wawel Dragon
- Tomasz Włosok as Janek Szewczyk
- Vanessa Aleksander as Ola
- Tomasz Drabek as Boruta
- Piotr Machalica as Rokita
- Paweł Domagała as Boguś Kołodziej
- Olaf Lubaszenko as Eugeniusz Bardacha
- Michalina Olszańska as Rzepicha
- Katarzyna Pośpiech as Yaga
- Jerzy Stuhr as St. Mary's Trumpet Call performer
- Małgorzata Mikołajczak as a woman robot
- Weronika Wachowska and Julianna Piotrowska as Basilisk (voice)

== Short films ==
No.	Title	Directed by	Written by	Original release date	Viewers (millions)
1	"Twardowsky"	Tomasz Bagiński	Błażej Dzikowski	15 December 2015	7
2	"The Dragon"	Tomasz Bagiński	Błażej Dzikowski	30 November 2015	5.75
3	"Twardowsky 2.0"	Tomasz Bagiński	Błażej Dzikowski	16 September 2016	5.9
4	"Operation Basilisc"	Tomasz Bagiński	Dominik L. Marzec	9 November 2016	9.4
5	"Yaga"	Tomasz Bagiński	Błażej Dzikowski	9 December 2016	8.13

== Feature film ==
In May 2018, it was announced that Tomasz Bagiński would direct a feature film set in the universe of Polish Legends, titled Twardowsky 3.14. It was set to continue the story of the main characters from the shorts. It was announced that the movie would most likely premiere in late 2019, however, it never happened.

== Music videos ==
There were several song covers made for the project. Each song had its own music video set in the universe of the short series. The songs were:

- Aleja Gwiazd by Matheo and Anna Karwan (23 September 2016)
- Mój jest ten kawałek podłogi by Matheo and Andrzej Donarski (16 November 2016)
- Jaskółka uwięziona by Atanas Valkov and Georgina Tarasiuk (16 December 2016)
- Cichosza by Marcin Macuk and Krzysztof Zalewski (6 June 2017)
- Jezu jak się cieszę by Atanas Valkov and Skubas (11 July 2017)
- Kocham wolność by Matheo and Damian Ukeje (8 October 2017)

== Books ==
=== Legendy Polskie ===
An anthology titled Legendy Polskie, which consists of stories based on the Polish legends and folk tales, has been published on 30 November 2015 by Allegro. The stories were written by: Elżbieta Cherezińska, Rafał Kosik, Jakub Małecki, Łukasz Orbitowski, Radek Rak, Robert Wegner. The stories are:

- Spójrz mi w oczy by Elżbieta Cherezińska, inspired by the Basilisk,
- Śnięci rycerze by Rafał Kosik, inspired by the Dreaming Knights,
- Zwyczajny gigant by Jakub Małecki, inspired by Sir Twardowski,
- Niewidzialne by Łukasz Orbitowski, inspired by the Water of Life,
- Kwiaty paproci by Radek Rak, inspired by the fern flower,
- Milczenie owcy by Robert Wegner, inspired by the Wawel Dragon.

The book was originally published as an ebook, however in 2018, the paper version has been also published.

=== Wywiad z Borutą ===
The short story Wywiad z Borutą ("An Interview with Boruta") written by Łukasz Orbitowski and Michał Cetnarowski, has been published as an e-book and audiobook in June 2016 by Allegro (available online for free). It is set in the universe of the shorts. The authors have been awarded the Janusz A. Zajdel Award for the book. It was originally published as an ebook, and in 2018, it was also published in the paper version. It has an audiobook version, recorded by Krystyna Janda and Tomasz Drabek.

== Interactive film ==
In 2025, Allegro released an interactive film titled Allegroverse 25: Legenda Allegrowicza, to celebrate its 25th anniversary. Filmed from a point of view of the audience, its story included characters from the previous Polish Legends shorts, such as Yaga, Boruta, and Basilisk, as well as the Grandfather (Robert Mazurkiewicz), a character from a popular 2016 Allegro commercial, and new characters, such as Mrs. Twardowsa (Danuta Stenka), Master Pay (Sebastian Dela), and Andrzej (Andrzej Grabowski).

== Reception ==
The shorts were met with a positive reaction by the viewers, with the first two shorts, Twardowsky and The Dragon, gaining 6 million views in the first few weeks after their premiere.
