= Taniec z gwiazdami season 29 =

Polish TV show

Taniec z gwiazdami
- Season 29
- Hosted by: Krzysztof Ibisz; Paulina Sykut-Jeżyna
- Judges: Rafał Maserak; Ewa Kasprzyk; Tomasz Wygoda; Iwona Pavlović
- Celebrity winner: Maria Jeleniewska
- Professional winner: Jacek Jeschke
- No. of episodes: 10

Release
- Original network: Polsat
- Original release: 2 March – 11 May 2025

Season chronology
- ← Previous; Season 28 Next → Season 30

The 29th season of Taniec z gwiazdami, the Polish edition of Dancing with the Stars, began on 2 March 2025. This was the sixteenth season aired on Polsat. Iwona Pavlović, Rafał Maserak, Ewa Kasprzyk and Tomasz Wygoda returned as judges. Krzysztof Ibisz and Paulina Sykut-Jeżyna reprised their role as hosts.

Michał Bartkiewicz, Jacek Jeschke, Agnieszka Kaczorowska, Jan Kliment, Lenka Klimentová, Wojciech Kucina, Mieszko Masłowski, Izabela Skierska and Daria Syta returned to the series as a pro and Albert Kosiński, Piotr Musiałkowski and Magdalena Tarnowska joined the pros.

On 11 May, Maria Jeleniewska and her partner Jacek Jeschke were crowned the champions.

== Couples ==
Celebrity	Notability	Professional partner	Status	Source(s)
Maciej Kurzajewski	Polsat presenter	Lenka Klimentová	Eliminated 1st on 9 March 2025	
Cezary Trybański	Former NBA player	Izabela Skierska	Eliminated 2nd on 16 March 2025	
Grażyna Szapołowska	Film and television actress	Jan Kliment	Eliminated 3rd on 16 March 2025	
Magda Mołek	Television presenter and Taniec z gwiazdami former host	Michał Bartkiewicz	Eliminated 4th on 30 March 2025	
Magdalena Narożna	Piękni i Młodzi singer & Must Be the Music finalist	Piotr Musiałkowski; Michał Kassin (week 10)	Eliminated 5th on 6 April 2025	
Ola Filipek	RMF FM presenter	Wojciech Kucina	Eliminated 6th on 6 April 2025	
Michał Barczak	Film and television actor	Magdalena Tarnowska	Eliminated 7th on 13 April 2025	
Blanka	Singer, model & Eurovision 2023 finalist	Mieszko Masłowski	Eliminated 8th on 27 April 2025	
Tomasz Wolny	Journalist & television presenter	Daria Syta	Eliminated 9th on 4 May 2025	
Adrianna Borek	Comedian	Albert Kosiński	Third place on 11 May 2025	
Filip Gurłacz	Film and television actor	Agnieszka Kaczorowska	Runners-up on 11 May 2025	
Maria Jeleniewska	Social media personality	Jacek Jeschke	Winners on 11 May 2025	

== Scoring chart ==
Couple	Place	1	2	1+2	3	4	5	4+5	6	7	8	9	10
Maria & Jacek	1	36	37	73	38	40†	40+5=45	85	40+2=42†	40+40=80†	37+38=75†	38+40=78	40+40+40=120†
Filip & Agnieszka	2	36	37	73	40†	40†	39+8=47†	87†	37+2=39	40+38=78	35+40=75†	40+40=80†	40+40+40=120†
Adrianna & Albert	3	27	31	58	36	33	36+9=45	78	31	35+30=65	35+36=71	35+31=66	38+39+40=117‡
Tomasz & Daria	4	29	26	55	32	37	33+7=40	77	32	30+33=63‡	29+30=59‡	32+33=65‡	
Blanka & Mieszko	5	32	40†	72	40†	40†	31+2=33	73	38+2=40	40+40=80†	32+31=63		
Michał & Magdalena	6	40†	34	74†	27	36	38+6=44	80	38+2=40	34+36=70			
Ola & Wojciech	7	30	30	60	24‡	32‡	27+1=28‡	60‡	30				
Magdalena & Piotr	8	27	28	55	27	32‡	26+4=30	62	26‡				
Magda & Michał	9	28	27	55	31	37	31+3=34	71					
Grażyna & Jan	10	32	28	60	31								
Cezary & Izabela	11	23‡	24‡	47‡	—								
Maciej & Lenka	12	28	28	56									

Red numbers indicate the lowest score for each week.
Green numbers indicate the highest score for each week.
indicates the couple eliminated that week.
indicates the couple that was eliminated but later returned to the competition.
indicates the returning couple that finished in the bottom two or three.
indicates the winning couple.
indicates the runner-up.
indicates the couple in third place.

== Average score chart ==
This table only counts for dances scored on a 40-points scale.

Rank by average	Place	Couple	Total points	Number of dances	Average
1	1	Maria & Jacek	584	15	38.9
2	2	Filip & Agnieszka	582	15	38.8
3	5	Blanka & Mieszko	364	10	36.4
4	6	Michał & Magdalena	283	8	35.4
5	3	Adrianna & Albert	513	15	34.2
6	4	Tomasz & Daria	376	12	31.3
7	9	Magda & Michał	154	5	30.8
8	10	Grażyna & Jan	91	3	30.3
9	7	Ola & Wojciech	173	6	28.8
10	12	Maciej & Lenka	56	2	28.0
11	8	Magdalena & Piotr	166	6	27.7
12	11	Cezary & Izabela	47	2	23.5

== Highest and lowest scoring performances ==
The best and worst performances in each dance according to the judges' 40-point scale:

Dance	Best dancer(s)	Highest score	Worst dancer(s)	Lowest score
Cha-cha-cha	Filip Gurłacz; Maria Jeleniewska	40	Ola Filipek	24
Waltz	Filip Gurłacz; Maria Jeleniewska	37	Maciej Kurzajewski; Magdalena Narożna	28
Jive	Filip Gurłacz; Maria Jeleniewska	40	Cezary Trybański	24
Quickstep	Blanka; Maria Jeleniewska	40	Ola Filipek; Tomasz Wolny	30
Viennese Waltz	Blanka; Maria Jeleniewska; Filip Gurłacz	40	Cezary Trybański	23
Paso Doble	Michał Barczak	40	Maciej Kurzajewski; Grażyna Szapołowska	28
Rumba	Filip Gurłacz	40	Magdalena Narożna	26
Samba	Blanka	40	Magdalena Narożna	27
Salsa	Maria Jeleniewska	40	Blanka; Ola Filipek	32
Tango	Maria Jeleniewska	40	Ola Filipek	27
Foxtrot	Filip Gurłacz; Maria Jeleniewska	40	Magdalena Narożna	26
Mambo	Magda Mołek	31		
Bachata	Michał Barczak	27		
Brazilian Zouk	Maria Jeleniewska	38		
Kizomba	Filip Gurłacz	40		
Argentine Tango	Blanka; Filip Gurłacz	40	Tomasz Wolny	37
Charleston	Maria Jeleniewska	38	Tomasz Wolny	32
Contemporary	Blanka	38		
Broadway	Adrianna Borek	35		
Polish Dance	Maria Jeleniewska (Mazur)	38	Tomasz Wolny (Oberek)	29
Freestyle	Adrianna Borek; Maria Jeleniewska; Filip Gurłacz	40		

== Couples' highest and lowest scoring dances ==
According to the 40-point scale:

Couples	Highest scoring dance(s)	Lowest scoring dance(s)
Maria & Jacek	Salsa, Tango (twice), Viennese Waltz, Foxtrot, Cha-cha-cha, Jive, Quickstep, Freestyle (40)	Quickstep (36)
Filip & Agnieszka	Kizomba (twice), Foxtrot, Cha-cha-cha, Argentine Tango, Viennese Waltz, Rumba, Jive, Freestyle (40)	Krakowiak (35)
Adrianna & Albert	Freestyle (40)	Viennese Waltz (27)
Tomasz & Daria	Argentine Tango (37)	Cha-cha-cha (26)
Blanka & Mieszko	Quickstep (twice), Samba, Viennese Waltz, Argentine Tango (40)	Jive, Polonez (31)
Michał & Magdalena	Paso Doble (40)	Bachata (27)
Ola & Wojciech	Salsa (32)	Cha-cha-cha (24)
Magdalena & Piotr	Cha-cha-cha (32)	Foxtrot, Rumba (26)
Magda & Michał	Quickstep (37)	Viennese Waltz (27)
Grażyna & Jan	Waltz (32)	Paso Doble (28)
Cezary & Izabela	Jive (24)	Viennese Waltz (23)
Maciej & Lenka	Paso Doble, Waltz (28)	Paso Doble, Waltz (28)

== Weekly scores ==
Unless indicated otherwise, individual judges scores in the charts below (given in parentheses) are listed in this order from left to right: Rafał Maserak, Ewa Kasprzyk, Tomasz Wygoda, Iwona Pavlović.

=== Week 1: Season Premiere ===
Running order

Couple	Score	Dance	Music
Blanka & Mieszko	32 (8,8,8,8)	Cha-cha-cha	"Espresso"—Sabrina Carpenter
Tomasz & Daria	29 (7,8,7,7)	Waltz	"Easy on Me"—Adele
Magdalena & Piotr	27 (7,8,6,6)	Jive	"Nie bądź taki szybki Bill"—Katarzyna Sobczyk
Filip & Agnieszka	36 (9,9,9,9)	Quickstep	"Trofea"—Dawid Podsiadło
Cezary & Izabela	23 (6,7,5,5)	Viennese Waltz	"Zanim zrozumiesz"—Varius Manx
Maciej & Lenka	28 (7,8,7,6)	Paso Doble	"Seven Nation Army"—The White Stripes
Ola & Wojciech	30 (8,8,7,7)	Jive	"Wake Me Up Before You Go-Go"—Wham!
Grażyna & Jan	32 (8,9,8,7)	Waltz	"You Light Up My Life"—Debby Boone
Maria & Jacek	36 (9,9,9,9)	Quickstep	"Pon De Replay"—Rihanna
Michał & Magdalena	40 (10,10,10,10)	Paso Doble	"El Conquistador"—José Esparza
Adrianna & Albert	27 (7,7,7,6)	Viennese Waltz	"Say You Love Me"—Jessie Ware
Magda & Michał	28 (7,8,7,6)	Cha-cha-cha	"I'm Every Woman"—Chaka Khan

=== Week 2 ===
Running order

Couple	Score	Dance	Music	Result
Filip & Agnieszka	37 (9,10,9,9)	Jive	"Bang bang"—Sylwia Grzeszczak	Safe
Ola & Wojciech	30 (8,8,7,7)	Quickstep	"Flying"—Nice Little Penguins	Safe
Michał & Magdalena	34 (8,9,9,8)	Viennese Waltz	"When a Man Loves a Woman"—Percy Sledge	Safe
Adrianna & Albert	31 (8,8,8,7)	Paso Doble	"The Final Countdown"—Europe	Safe
Magdalena & Piotr	28 (8,8,7,5)	Waltz	"All By Myself"—Eric Carmen	Bottom three
Tomasz & Daria	26 (7,9,6,4)	Cha-cha-cha	"Tam słońce, gdzie my"—Wiktor Dyduła	Safe
Magda & Michał	27 (7,8,6,6)	Viennese Waltz	"Oscar Winning Tears"—Raye	Safe
Blanka & Mieszko	40 (10,10,10,10)	Quickstep	"Déjà Vu"—Beyoncé	Safe
Grażyna & Jan	28 (7,8,7,6)	Paso Doble	"Eviva España"—Leo Caerts	Safe
Cezary & Izabela	24 (7,8,5,4)	Jive	"Man! I Feel Like a Woman!"—Shania Twain	Bottom three
Maciej & Lenka	28 (8,9,6,5)	Waltz	"Just Once"—James Ingram & Quincy Jones	Eliminated
Maria & Jacek	37 (9,10,9,9)	Cha-cha-cha	"Good Luck, Babe!"—Chappell Roan	Safe

=== Week 3: Latin Night ===
Dance-off performances

Couple	Dance	Music	Result
Cezary & Izabela	Argentine Tango	"Tormenta Instrumetal Tango"—Tomasz Szymuś Orchestra	Eliminated
Magdalena & Piotr	Argentine Tango	"Tormenta Instrumetal Tango"—Tomasz Szymuś Orchestra	Safe

Judges' votes to save

- Maserak: Magdalena & Piotr
- Kasprzyk: Cezary & Izabela
- Wygoda: Magdalena & Piotr
- Pavlović: Magdalena & Piotr

Running order

Couple	Score	Dance	Music	Result
Ola & Wojciech	24 (7,8,5,4)	Cha-cha-cha	"Señorita"—Camila Cabello & Shawn Mendes	Safe
Tomasz & Daria	32 (8,9,8,7)	Rumba	"Bésame Mucho"—Cesária Évora	Safe
Magda & Michał	31 (7,8,8,8)	Mambo	"La Pantera Mambo"—Orquesta La 33	Safe
Michał & Magdalena	27 (6,8,7,6)	Bachata	"Bailando Bachata"—Chayanne	Bottom two
Adrianna & Albert	36 (8,10,9,9)	Cha-cha-cha	"Let's Get Loud"—Jennifer Lopez	Safe
Maria & Jacek	38 (9,10,10,9)	Brazilian Zouk	"Héroe"—Enrique Iglesias	Safe
Filip & Agnieszka	40 (10,10,10,10)	Kizomba	"Calm Down"—Rema & Selena Gomez	Safe
Blanka & Mieszko	40 (10,10,10,10)	Samba	"Livin' la Vida Loca"—Ricky Martin	Safe
Grażyna & Jan	31 (8,9,9,5)	Rumba	"No Sé Por Que Te Quiero"—Ana Belén & Antonio Banderas	Eliminated
Magdalena & Piotr	27 (7,8,7,5)	Samba	"Macarena"—Los del Río	Safe

=== Week 4: Family Night (Trios) ===
Running order

Couple	Score	Dance	Music
Maria & Jacek (Iwona Kaciun)	40 (10,10,10,10)	Salsa	"Pa'llá Voy"—Marc Anthony
Tomasz & Daria (Agata Wolna)	37 (9,10,9,9)	Argentine Tango	"Jealousy"—Jacob Gade
Adrianna & Albert (Jan Borek)	33 (8,9,8,8)	Waltz	"Unchained Melody"—Elvis Presley
Magdalena & Piotr (Gabriela Narożna)	32 (8,9,8,7)	Cha-cha-cha	"Buona Sera Ciao Ciao"—Mauro Pawlowski
Michał & Magdalena (Ewelina Strauchmann)	36 (8,10,9,9)	Waltz	"If You Don't Know Me by Now"—Simply Red
Magda & Michał (Urszula Chincz)	37 (9,10,9,9)	Quickstep	"Cheri Cheri Lady"—Modern Talking
Ola & Wojciech (Wiktoria Filus)	32 (8,9,8,7)	Salsa	"Bam Bam"—Camila Cabello
Filip & Agnieszka (Grzegorz Gurłacz)	40 (10,10,10,10)	Foxtrot	Poszukiwany, poszukiwana Theme—Jerzy Matuszkiewicz
Blanka & Mieszko (Anastazja Iljutczyk)	40 (10,10,10,10)	Viennese Waltz	"Iris"—Goo Goo Dolls

=== Week 5: Disco Night ===
Running order

Couple	Score	Dance	Music	Result
Michał & Magdalena	38 (9,10,10,9)	Cha-cha-cha	"Murder on the Dancefloor"—Sophie Ellis-Bextor	Safe
Magdalena & Piotr	26 (7,9,6,4)	Foxtrot	"Like a Virgin"—Madonna	Bottom two
Tomasz & Daria	33 (8,10,8,7)	Paso Doble	"Wszystko czego dziś chcę"—Izabela Trojanowska	Safe
Ola & Wojciech	27 (7,8,7,5)	Tango	"I Will Survive"—Gloria Gaynor	Safe
Blanka & Mieszko	31 (8,9,8,6)	Jive	"Maniac"—Michael Sembello	Safe
Filip & Agnieszka	39 (10,10,10,9)	Samba	"Stayin' Alive"—Bee Gees	Safe
Magda & Michał	31 (8,8,8,7)	Jive	"Słodkiego, miłego życia"—Kombi	Eliminated
Maria & Jacek	40 (10,10,10,10)	Tango	"Hot Stuff"—Donna Summer	Safe
Adrianna & Albert	36 (9,10,9,8)	Jive	"I'm So Excited"—The Pointer Sisters	Safe
Adrianna & Albert; Filip & Agnieszka; Tomasz & Daria; Michał & Magdalena; Maria & Jacek; Magdalena & Piotr; Magda & Michał; Blanka & Mieszko; Ola & Wojciech	9; 8; 7; 6; 5; 4; 3; 2; 1	Disco; Marathon	''One Night Only" (from Dreamgirls)—Beyoncé, Sharon Leal, Anika Noni Rose	

=== Week 6: Disney Night ===
Running order

Couple	Score	Dance	Music	Animated film	Result
Blanka & Mieszko	38 (9,10,9,10)	Contemporary	"Dwa światy"—Kuba Jurzyk	Tarzan	Safe
Tomasz & Daria	32 (8,8,8,8)	Charleston	"A Star Is Born"—Lillias White	Hercules	Safe
Maria & Jacek	40 (10,10,10,10)	Viennese Waltz	"Naprawdę chcę"—Sara James	Little Mermaid	Safe
Magdalena & Piotr	26 (7,8,6,5)	Rumba	"Wspaniały świat"—Marcin Franc & Natalia Piotrowska	Aladdin	Eliminated
Filip & Agnieszka	37 (9,10,9,9)	Waltz	"Can You Feel the Love Tonight"—Elton John	The Lion King	Safe
Michał & Magdalena	38 (9,10,10,9)	Foxtrot	"Drobnostka"—Igor Kwiatkowski	Moana	Bottom three
Adrianna & Albert	31 (8,8,8,7)	Rumba	"Kolorowy wiatr"—Edyta Górniak	Pocahontas	Safe
Ola & Wojciech	30 (8,9,7,6)	Waltz	"A Dream Is a Wish Your Heart Makes"—Ilene Woods	Cinderella	Eliminated
Blanka & Mieszko; Maria & Jacek; Filip & Agnieszka; Michał & Magdalena	2 (Yes,Yes,No,Yes)	Freestyle (Paulina's group)	"Nie mówimy o Brunie"—Damian Ukeje & Monika Borzym	Encanto	
Tomasz & Daria; Magdalena & Piotr; Ola & Wojciech; Adrianna & Albert	0 (No,No,Yes,No)	Freestyle (Krzysztof's group)	"Nie bój się chcieć"—Paulina Przybysz	Zootopia	

=== Week 7: Back in Time ===
Running order

Couple	Score	Dance	Music	Result
Michał & Magdalena	34 (8,9,9,8)	Charleston	"Puttin' On the Ritz"—Taco	Eliminated
Michał & Magdalena	36 (7,9,10,10)	Viennese Waltz	"Lubię wracać tam, gdzie byłem"—Zbigniew Wodecki	Eliminated
Adrianna & Albert	35 (9,10,8,8)	Broadway Jazz	"Big Spender"—Peggy Lee	Safe
Adrianna & Albert	30 (8,9,7,6)	Waltz	"Wymyśliłam cię”—Irena Jarocka	Safe
Tomasz & Daria	30 (7,9,8,6)	Quickstep	"Sing, Sing, Sing"—Benny Goodman	Bottom two
Tomasz & Daria	33 (8,9,9,7)	Rumba	"Pod papugami"—Czesław Niemen	Bottom two
Blanka & Mieszko	40 (10,10,10,10)	Argentine Tango	"Cell Block Tango"—Chicago cast	Safe
Blanka & Mieszko	40 (10,10,10,10)	Quickstep	"Nie dokazuj"—Marek Grechuta	Safe
Filip & Agnieszka	40 (10,10,10,10)	Cha-cha-cha	"Sway"—Michael Bublé	Safe
Filip & Agnieszka	38 (10,10,9,9)	Foxtrot	"Zacznij od Bacha"—Zbigniew Wodecki	Safe
Maria & Jacek	40 (10,10,10,10)	Foxtrot	"Fever"—Peggy Lee	Safe
Maria & Jacek	40 (10,10,10,10)	Cha-cha-cha	"Czy czuje pani cza-czę?"—Andrzej Rosiewicz	Safe

=== Week 8: Polish Folk Night ===
Running order

Couple	Score	Dance	Music	Result
Filip & Agnieszka	35 (9,9,9,8)	Krakowiak	"Płynie Wisła, płynie"	Safe
Filip & Agnieszka	40 (10,10,10,10)	Argentine Tango	"Tabakiera"—Kayah & Goran Bregović	Safe
Maria & Jacek	37 (9,10,9,9)	Waltz	"Dwa serduszka, cztery oczy"—Joanna Kulig	Safe
Maria & Jacek	38 (9,10,10,9)	Mazur	"Ostatni mazur"	Safe
Tomasz & Daria	29 (8,8,7,6)	Oberek	"Kukułeczka"	Bottom two
Tomasz & Daria	30 (8,9,7,6)	Jive	"Skrzydlate ręce"—Enej	Bottom two
Blanka & Mieszko	32 (8,8,8,8)	Salsa	"My Słowianie"—Donatan & Cleo	Eliminated
Blanka & Mieszko	31 (8,8,8,7)	Polonez	"Tam na mostku"	Eliminated
Adrianna & Albert	35 (8,9,8,10)	Kujawiak	"Czerwone jabłuszko"	Safe
Adrianna & Albert	36 (9,10,10,7)	Tango	"Boso"—Zakopower	Safe

=== Week 9: The Semifinals ===
Running order

Couple	Score	Dance	Music	Result
Tomasz & Daria	32 (8,9,8,7)	Viennese Waltz	"Tańcząc w powietrzu"—Anawa	Bottom two
Tomasz & Daria	33 (9,10,8,6)	Salsa	"La Vida Es Un Carnaval"—Celia Cruz	Bottom two
Maria & Jacek	38 (10,10,9,9)	Charleston	"Trick Me"—Kelis	Safe
Maria & Jacek	40 (10,10,10,10)	Jive	"As It Was"—Harry Styles	Safe
Filip & Agnieszka	40 (10,10,10,10)	Viennese Waltz	"A Thousand Years"—Christina Perri	Safe
Filip & Agnieszka	40 (10,10,10,10)	Rumba	"Miłość miłość"—Krzysztof Zalewski	Safe
Adrianna & Albert	35 (9,9,9,8)	Foxtrot	"Raindrops Keep Falling On My Head"—B.J. Thomas	Bottom two
Adrianna & Albert	31 (8,8,8,7)	Samba	"All Night Long (All Night)"—Lionel Richie	Bottom two

Dance-off performances

Couple	Dance	Music	Result
Tomasz & Daria	Cha-cha-cha	"Katchi"—Ofenbach	Eliminated
Adrianna & Albert	Cha-cha-cha	"Katchi"—Ofenbach	Safe

Judges' votes to save

- Maserak: Adrianna & Albert
- Kasprzyk: Tomasz & Daria
- Wygoda: Adrianna & Albert
- Pavlović: Adrianna & Albert

=== Week 10: The Finals ===
Running order

Couple	Score	Dance	Music	Result
Adrianna & Albert	38 (10,10,9,9)	Paso Doble	"The Final Countdown"—Europe	3rd place
Adrianna & Albert	39 (10,10,10,9)	Viennese Waltz	"I Have Nothing"—Whitney Houston	3rd place
Adrianna & Albert	40 (10,10,10,10)	Freestyle	"I'll Be There For You"—The Rembrandts	3rd place
Filip & Agnieszka	40 (10,10,10,10)	Kizomba	"Calm Down"—Rema & Selena Gomez	Runners-up
Filip & Agnieszka	40 (10,10,10,10)	Jive	"Hit the Road Jack"—Ray Charles	Runners-up
Filip & Agnieszka	40 (10,10,10,10)	Freestyle	"Caravan"—John Wasson "Una Mattina"—Ludovico Einaudi	Runners-up
Maria & Jacek	40 (10,10,10,10)	Tango	"Hot Stuff"—Donna Summer	Winners
Maria & Jacek	40 (10,10,10,10)	Quickstep	"You Can't Hurry Love"—The Supremes	Winners
Maria & Jacek	40 (10,10,10,10)	Freestyle	"Długość dźwięku samotności"—Myslovitz	Winners

Other Dances

Couple	Dance	Music
Tomasz & Daria	Rumba	''Uciekaj moje serce''—Seweryn Krajewski
Blanka & Mieszko	Rumba	''Uciekaj moje serce''—Seweryn Krajewski
Michał & Magdalena	Rumba	''Uciekaj moje serce''—Seweryn Krajewski
Ola & Wojciech	Rumba	''Uciekaj moje serce''—Seweryn Krajewski
Magdalena & Michał	Rumba	''Uciekaj moje serce''—Seweryn Krajewski
Magda & Michał	Rumba	''Uciekaj moje serce''—Seweryn Krajewski
Grażyna & Jan	Rumba	''Uciekaj moje serce''—Seweryn Krajewski
Cezary & Izabela	Rumba	''Uciekaj moje serce''—Seweryn Krajewski
Maciej & Lenka	Rumba	''Uciekaj moje serce''—Seweryn Krajewski

== Dance chart ==
The celebrities and professional partners danced one of these routines for each corresponding week:

- Week 1 (Season Premiere): Cha-cha-cha, Waltz, Jive, Quickstep, Viennese Waltz, Paso Doble
- Week 2: One unlearned dance
- Week 3 (Latin Night): One unlearned dance (introducing Argentine Tango, Rumba, Mambo, Bachata, Brazilian Zouk, Kizomba, Samba)
- Week 4 (Family Night): One unlearned dance (introducing Salsa, Foxtrot)
- Week 5 (Disco Night): One unlearned dance (introducing Tango) and Disco marathon
- Week 6 (Disney Night): One unlearned dance (introducing Contemporary, Charleston) and team dance
- Week 7 (Back in Time): One unlearned dance & one repeated dance (introducing Broadway)
- Week 8 (Polish Folk Night): One unlearned dance & one Polish folk dance (introducing Krakowiak, Oberek, Kujawiak, Mazur, Polonez)
- Week 9 (The Semifinals): Two unlearned dances
- Week 10 (The Finals): Favorite dance of the season, judges' choice and Freestyle

Couple	1	2	3	4	5		6		7		8		9		10		
Maria & Jacek	Quickstep	Cha-cha-cha	Brazilian Zouk	Salsa	Tango	Disco (Marathon)	Viennese Waltz	Freestyle (Paulina's group)	Foxtrot	Cha-cha-cha	Waltz	Mazur	Charleston	Jive	Tango	Quickstep	Freestyle
Filip & Agnieszka	Quickstep	Jive	Kizomba	Foxtrot	Samba	Disco (Marathon)	Waltz	Freestyle (Paulina's group)	Cha-cha-cha	Foxtrot	Krakowiak	Argentine Tango	Viennese Waltz	Rumba	Kizomba	Jive	Freestyle
Adrianna & Albert	Viennese Waltz	Paso Doble	Cha-cha-cha	Waltz	Jive	Disco (Marathon)	Rumba	Freestyle (Krzysztof's group)	Broadway Jazz	Waltz	Kujawiak	Tango	Foxtrot	Samba	Paso Doble	Viennese Waltz	Freestyle
Tomasz & Daria	Waltz	Cha-cha-cha	Rumba	Argentine Tango	Paso Doble	Disco (Marathon)	Charleston	Freestyle (Krzysztof's group)	Quickstep	Rumba	Oberek	Jive	Viennese Waltz	Salsa			Rumba
Blanka & Mieszko	Cha-cha-cha	Quickstep	Samba	Viennese Waltz	Jive	Disco (Marathon)	Contemporary	Freestyle (Paulina's group)	Argentine Tango	Quickstep	Salsa	Polonez					Rumba
Michał & Magdalena	Paso Doble	Viennese Waltz	Bachata	Waltz	Cha-cha-cha	Disco (Marathon)	Foxtrot	Freestyle (Paulina's group)	Charleston	Viennese Waltz							Rumba
Ola & Wojciech	Jive	Quickstep	Cha-cha-cha	Salsa	Tango	Disco (Marathon)	Waltz	Freestyle (Krzysztof's group)									Rumba
Magdalena & Piotr	Jive	Waltz	Samba	Cha-cha-cha	Foxtrot	Disco (Marathon)	Rumba	Freestyle (Krzysztof's group)									Rumba
Magda & Michał	Cha-cha-cha	Viennese Waltz	Mambo	Quickstep	Jive	Disco (Marathon)											Rumba
Grażyna & Jan	Waltz	Paso Doble	Rumba														Rumba
Cezary & Izabela	Viennese Waltz	Jive															Rumba
Maciej & Lenka	Paso Doble	Waltz															Rumba

Highest scoring dance
Lowest scoring dance
Performed, but not scored
Bonus points
Gained bonus points for winning this dance-off
Gained no bonus points for losing this dance-off

== Guest performances ==
Date	Artist(s)	Song(s)	Dancers
2 March 2025	Tomasz Szymuś's Orchestra	"We Are Family"	Collective Group
9 March 2025	Tomasz Szymuś's Orchestra	"Najwięcej witaminy"	All male celebrities and dancers
16 March 2025	Tomasz Szymuś's Orchestra	"Waka Waka (This Time for Africa)"/"Baila Mi Rumba"	Paulina Sykut-Jeżyna and Collective Group
23 March 2025	Majka Jeżowska	"Kolor serca"	All couples
23 March 2025	Tomasz Szymuś's Orchestra	"One Day in Your Life"	All couples, judges and hosts
30 March 2025	Tomasz Szymuś's Orchestra	"Rhythm of the Night"/"Disco Inferno"/"It's My Life"/"Music"	Art Movement Group
30 March 2025	Alicja Janosz	"Like a Virgin"	Magdalena Narożna & Piotr Musiałkowski
6 April 2025	Weronika Bochat-Piotrowska	"Nowy ląd"	Warsztatowa Akademia Musicalowa
6 April 2025	Kasia Łaska	"Mam tę moc"	
13 April 2025	Matt Dusk	"I've Got the World on a String"	Collective Group
27 April 2025	Tomasz Szymuś's Orchestra	"Jesień – tańcuj"	Ludowy Zespół Artystyczny PROMNI SGGW Warszawa
27 April 2025	Ludowy Zespół Artystyczny PROMNI SGGW Warszawa	"Płynie Wisła, płynie"	Filip Gurłacz & Agnieszka Kaczorowska
27 April 2025	Ludowy Zespół Artystyczny PROMNI SGGW Warszawa	"Ostatni mazur"	Maria Jeleniewska & Jacek Jeschke
27 April 2025	Ludowy Zespół Artystyczny PROMNI SGGW Warszawa	"Kukułeczka"	Tomasz Wolny & Daria Syta
27 April 2025	Ludowy Zespół Artystyczny PROMNI SGGW Warszawa	"Tam na mostku"	Blanka & Mieszko Masłowski
27 April 2025	Ludowy Zespół Artystyczny PROMNI SGGW Warszawa	"Czerwone jabłuszko"	Adrianna Borek & Albert Kosiński
27 April 2025	Cleo	"Karminowe usta"	Ludowy Zespół Artystyczny PROMNI SGGW Warszawa
4 May 2025	Tomasz Szymuś's Orchestra	"Abracadabra"	Collective Group
4 May 2025	Tomasz Szymuś's Orchestra	"To ostatnia niedziela"	Janja Lesar & Krzysztof Hulboj
4 May 2025	Tomasz Szymuś's Orchestra	"I've Got You Under My Skin"	Michał Jeziorowski & Aleksandra Piotrowska
11 May 2025	Tomasz Szymuś's Orchestra	"Supermoce"	All professional dancers
11 May 2025	Tomasz Szymuś's Orchestra	"Bracka" / "Attention"	Sara Janicka & Kamil Kuroczko
11 May 2025	Kuba Badach	"Uciekaj moje serce"	All eliminated couples
11 May 2025	Kayah & Dawid Kwiatkowski	"Proszę tańcz"	

== Rating figures ==
Date	Episode	Official rating 4+	Share 4+	Official rating 16–49	Share 16–49	Official rating 16–59	Share 16–59
2 March 2025	1						
9 March 2025	2						
16 March 2025	3						
23 March 2025	4						
30 March 2025	5						
6 April 2025	6						
13 April 2025	7						
27 April 2025	8						
4 May 2025	9						
11 May 2025	10						
Average	Spring 2025						
