= Matheo =

Matheo is a given name, a variant of Matthew. Notable people with the name include:

- Mathéo Bodmer (born 2004), French footballer
- Mathéo Didot (born 2002), French footballer
- Mathéo Jacquemoud (born 1990), French ski mountaineer
- Mathéo Moussa (born 2005), Gabonese footballer
- Mathéo Parmentier (born 2002), Belgian footballer
- Matheo Raab (born 1998), German footballer
- Mathéo Tuscher (born 1996), Swiss racing driver
- Mathéo Vroman (born 2001), French footballer
- Matheo Zoch (born 1996), Bolivian footballer
