= Tomasz Bagiński =

Polish illustrator, animator, producer and director

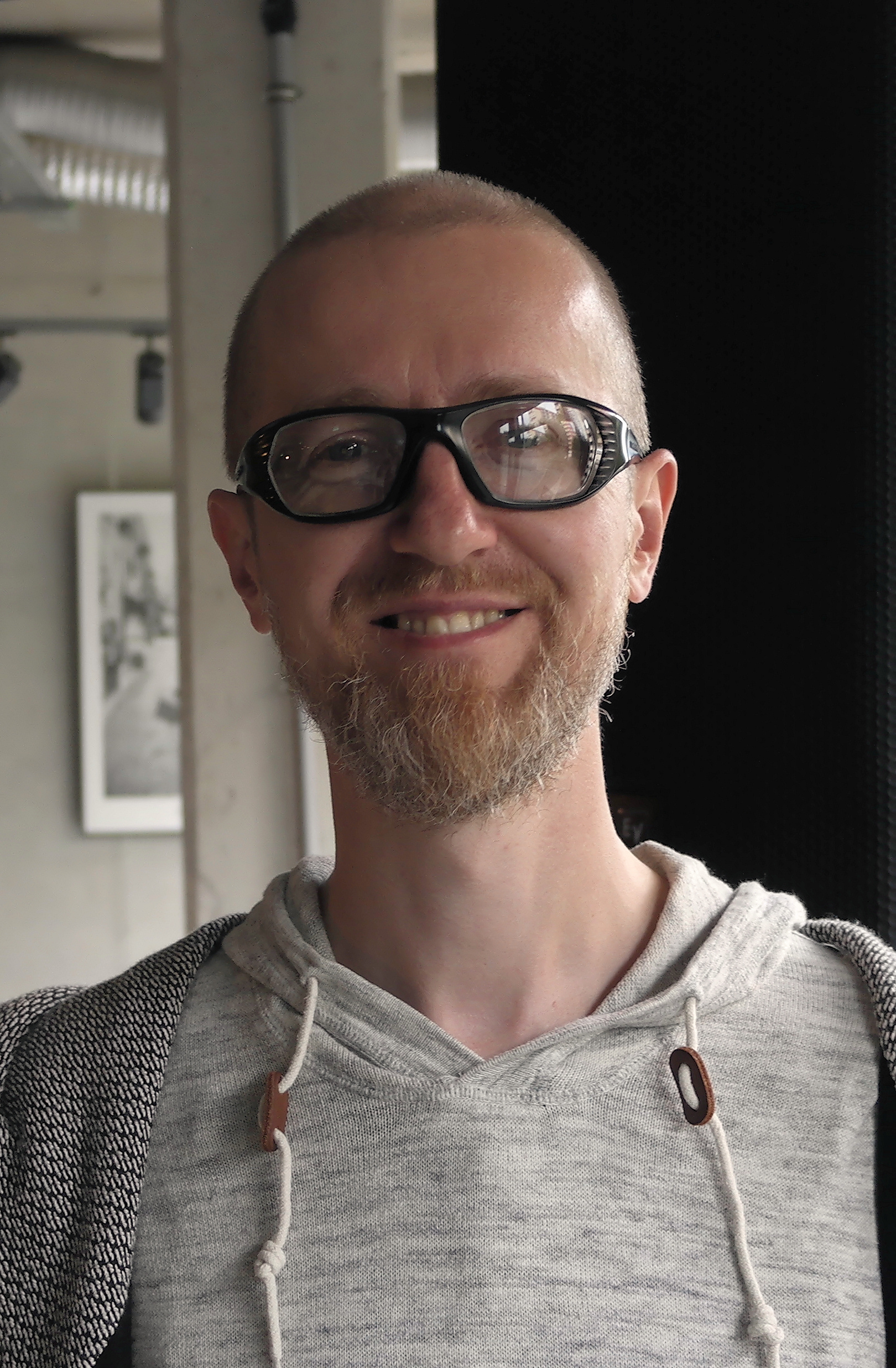
Bagiński in 2016

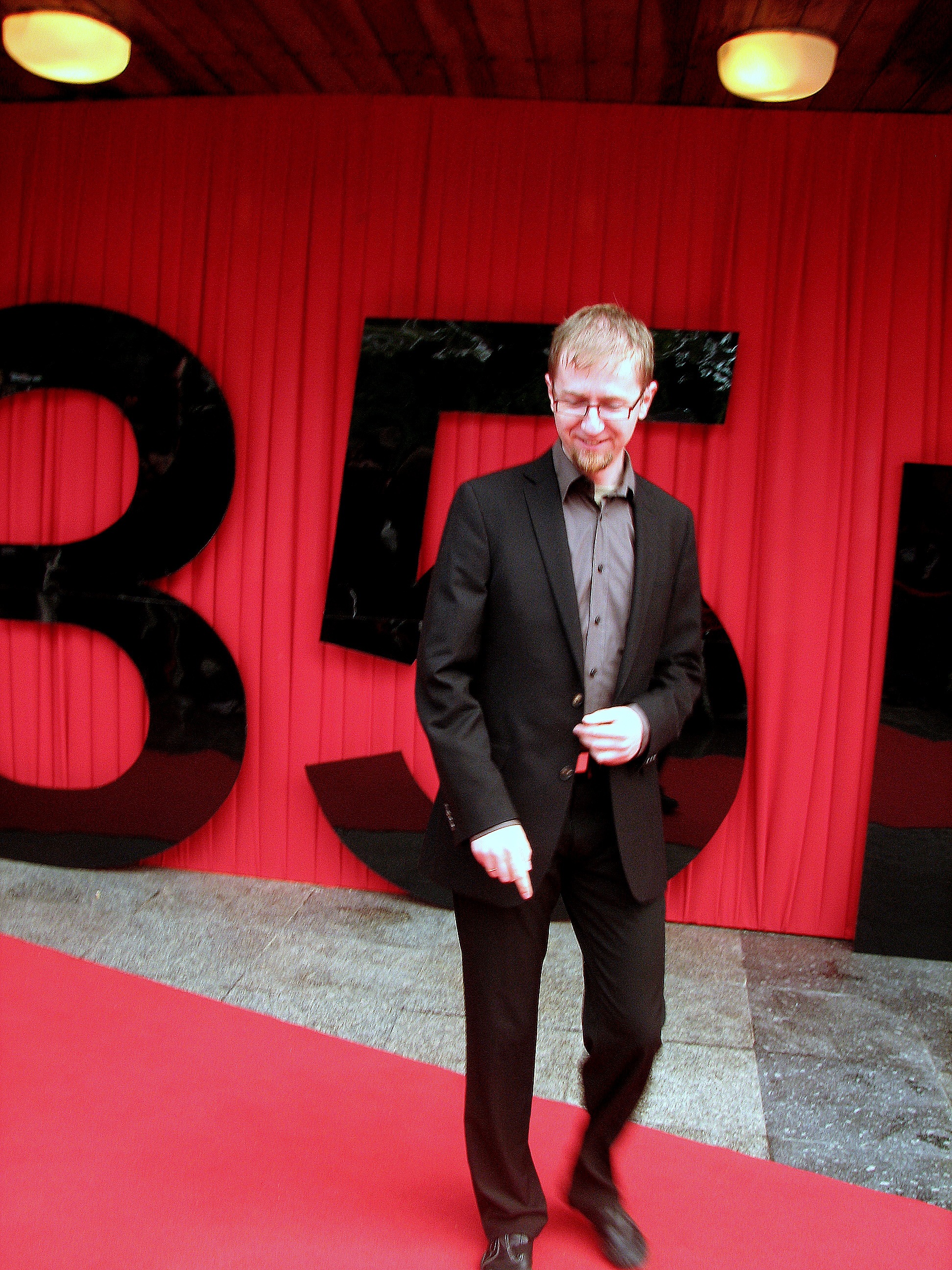
Tomasz Bagiński at opening gala XXXV Polish Film Festival in Gdynia 2010.

Tomasz "Tomek" Bagiński (Polish pronunciation: [ˈtɔmaʐ baˈɡʲij̃skʲi], born 10 January 1976 in Białystok) is a Polish illustrator, animator, producer and director. He is a self-taught artist.

== Education ==
Bagiński studied architecture at the Warsaw University of Technology.

== Career ==
His first film Rain has won several local awards and became the passport to Platige Image company, in which he is a creative director. Between 1999 and 2002 he was working on his short film debut, The Cathedral, which in 2002 won the first prize at SIGGRAPH, the biggest festival of animation and special effects, and a year later was nominated for the Academy Award for Best Animated Short Film.

In 2004, he made his second short film, Fallen Art. In 2005, he received another award at the SIGGRAPH festival, becoming the only artist in history who has won two main awards. Fallen Art also received a BAFTA Award for Best Short Animation and a Grand Prix for Digital Shorts at Golden Horse Film Festival 2005 (shared with Jarek Sawko and Piotr Sikora) as well as Prix Ars Electronica.

He designed the covers of all Jacek Dukaj's books, including the novel Ice.

In 2009, he directed another short film, The Kinematograph, based on a comic book by Mateusz Skutnik from the album Revolutions: Monochrome. Apart from his own projects, Bagiński works as a director on commercials and stage shows. He has published in many trade magazines, from the United States to China and Japan.

Bagiński has also created cinematics for The Witcher computer game based on the books by Andrzej Sapkowski and co-produces the Witcher Netflix series.

He is represented by UTA.

== Filmography ==
Short film

Year	Title	Director	Writer	Producer	Notes
1997	Deszcz	Yes	No	No	
2002	The Cathedral	Yes	Yes	No	
2004	Fallen Art	Yes	Yes	Yes	
2009	The Kinematograph	Yes	Yes	Yes	
2009	Bieg	Yes	No	No	
2011	Animowana historia Polski	Yes	No	No	Also editor
2014	Ambition	Yes	Yes	No	
2015	The Dragon	Yes	No	No	Segments of Polish Legends
2015	Twardowsky	Yes	No	No	Segments of Polish Legends
2016	Twardowsky 2.0	Yes	No	No	Segments of Polish Legends
2016	Operation Basilisk	Yes	No	No	Segments of Polish Legends
2016	Jaga	Yes	No	No	Segments of Polish Legends

Video game

- The Witcher (intro and outro) (2007)
- The Witcher 2 (intro) (2011)
- The Witcher 3 (intro) (2015)
- Cyberpunk 2077 (teaser trailer) (2013)

TV executive producer

- The Witcher (2019-2023)
- Into the Night (2020)
- The Witcher: Blood Origin (2023)
- The Witcher: Sirens of the Deep (2025)
- The Rats: A Witcher Tale (2025)

Feature film

- Knights of the Zodiac (2023)

Other

- Move Your Imagination - EURO 2012 UEFA (2011)
- Hardkor 44
