= Mój jest ten kawałek podłogi =

1986 song by Mr. Zoob

Single by Mr. Zoob

from the album Czego się gapisz?
- Released: 1986
- Genre: Alternative rock
- Length: 4:04
- Label: PolyGram
- Songwriter: Waldemar Miszczor

Mr. Zoob singles chronology
"Tylko jeden krok" (1984)	"Mój jest ten kawałek podłogi" (1986)	"Krzysiek – Zdzisiek" (1986)

Audio
- "Mój jest ten kawałek podłogi" on YouTube

"Mój jest ten kawałek podłogi" (Polish: [ˈmuj ˈjɛst ˈtɛn kaˈva.wɛk pɔdˈwɔ.ɡi]; lit. 'This is My Piece of the Floor'), also simply known as "Kawałek podłogi" (lit. 'The Piece of the Floor'), is a Polish-language alternative rock song by the band Mr. Zoob, written by Waldemar Miszczor. It was released in 1986 as a single and later on the 1987 Czego się gapisz? album. It is recognized as one of the most famous Polish-language rock songs and one of the most famous songs of the band. The song is about jailed man, who demands to have his own "piece of the floor", which is an allegory to people fighting for their freedom under the communist regime of the Polish People's Republic in the 1980s.

== Covers, popular culture and legacy ==
A cover of the song, performed by Matheo and Andrzej Donarski of Mr. Zoob, was used in 2016 short film Operation Basilisk, which was a part of the science fiction and fantasy film series Polish Legends. The song was also covered by DeDe Negra in 2019. It was covered again in 2020 by Sławek Uniatowski, during the "We Play for Belarus" (Polish: Gramy dla Białorusi) concert, organized at the National Stadion, Warsaw, as an act of support and solidarity for the protesters during the 2020–2021 Belarusian protests.

The song was popular among protesters during the 2020–2021 women's strike protests in Poland, being played during protests in cities of Kraków, Kielce, Staszów, and Ostrowiec Świętokrzyski.

The song has appeared on various lists of best Polish-language songs, including 4th on the list of 95 best songs of 95 years of Polskie Radio, and 26th on the list of 100 best songs by RMF FM,

It was used in a 2016 film The New World, and a 2020 film How I Became a Gangster.
