= The Cathedral (2002 film) =

- Directed by: Tomasz Bagiński
- Written by: Jacek Dukaj
- Produced by: Jarosław Sawko; Piotr Sikora
- Music by: Adam Rosiak
- Distributed by: Vision
- Release date: 2002
- Running time: 6:28
- Country: Poland
- Language: Silent

The Cathedral (Polish: Katedra) is a 2002 animated science fiction short film directed by Tomasz Bagiński. It is based on the short story of the same name by Jacek Dukaj, winner of the Janusz A. Zajdel Award in 2000. The film was nominated in 2002 for the Academy Award for Best Animated Short Film for the 75th Academy Awards. The film also won the title of Best Animated Short at SIGGRAPH 2002 in San Antonio.

== Plot ==
During an eclipse on an alien moon, a traveler explores a techno-organic cathedral. The light from his torch reveals still-living faces embedded in the tree-like pillars, which open their eyes or move in response to his passing. He reaches the unfinished end of the main hall and meditates until the end of the eclipse. As the light of the sun floods the building, the organic branches of the cathedral's structure burst from the traveler's body, quickly solidifying him into another living pillar.

== Reception ==
The film was nominated in 2002 for the Academy Award for Best Animated Short Film for the 75th Academy Awards. The movie won the title of Best Animated Short at SIGGRAPH 2002 in San Antonio as well as several other awards.

In May 2011, Polish Prime Minister Donald Tusk gave several gifts to American President Barack Obama for his tour in Europe, as is the custom. One of those gifts was an iPad loaded with The Cathedral.

== See also ==
- Fallen Art
