= Tomasz Włosok =

Polish actor (born 1990)

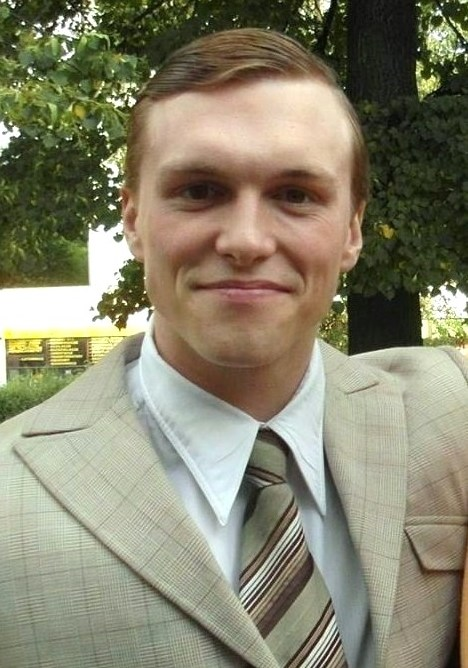
- Włosok in 2015
- Born: 13 October 1990 (age 35); Warsaw
- Citizenship: Polish
- Occupation: Actor

Tomasz Włosok (born 13 October 1990) is an actor.

== Biography ==
In 2016 he graduated in acting from the Kraków Theatre School.

== Filmography ==
- Our Century (2014, TV series) as Paweł Bartosiewicz
- Polish Legends (2015, TV series) as Janek Szewczyk
- Afterimage (2016) as Roman
- Jestem mordercą (2016) as militiaman Roman Mazur
- Chain Reaction (2017) as Adam
- Raven (2018, TV series) as Tomek “Rudy” Wójcik
- 1983 (2018, TV series) as Jakub Suchoparski
- Jak zostałem gangsterem. Historia prawdziwa (2019) as “Walden”
- Piosenki o miłości (2021) as Robert
- How I Fell in Love with a Gangster (2021) as Nikodem “Nikoś” Skotarczak
- Operation Hyacinth (2021) as Tadek Morawski
- Green Border (2023) as Jan
- Still Here (2023) as Janek
- Kulej. Dwie strony medalu (2024) as Jerzy Kulej
- Verily Hitler Is Dead (2025) as minister of the environment, police officer, beekeeper
- Król dopalaczy (2026) as Dawid

== Awards ==
- Zbigniew Cybulski Award (2023)
