= Kim Kold =

Danish Heavyweighter

- Professional bodybuilder

Personal info
- Born: 25 August 1965 (age 61); Copenhagen, Denmark

Best statistics
- Height: 6 ft 4 in (1.93 m)
- Weight: 132 kg (291 lb; 20 st 11 lb) (contest); 140 kg (310 lb; 22 st 1 lb) (off-season)

Kim Kold (born 25 August 1965) is a Danish actor and former professional bodybuilder. Standing 6 ft 4 in (1.93 m) and weighing 308 lb (140 kg), he is primarily known for his role as Owen Shaw's crew member, Klaus, in Fast & Furious 6.

== Early life ==
Born in Copenhagen, Kold played around 150 football matches as a goalkeeper in the lower leagues until he suffered from an injury at the age of 27. He was sent to the gym for rehabilitation training, where he took up an interest in bodybuilding.

== Career ==
Kold started competing in 1997. He won the Danish National Bodybuilding Championship in 2006. Kold worked as a locksmith in Denmark for several years during his bodybuilding career. He owns his own security business in Puerto Banús.

Kold was persuaded by his friend, film director Mads Matthiesen, to play the title role in Matthiesen's short film Dennis (2007). The film was not promoted, but soon became popular and made Kold a name as an actor. He reprised the role of Dennis when Matthiesen made Teddy Bear (2012), a feature-length adaptation of Dennis. He appeared as Klaus in Fast & Furious 6 (2013), as well as Polish short film Smok (2015), based on the legend of Wawel Dragon. In 2016, he appeared the film Star Trek Beyond as well as the film 6 Underground in 2019.

== Filmography ==
Year	Title	Role	Notes
2007-2012	Forbrydelsen II		
2007	Dennis	Dennis	Short
2008	Blå mænd	Rocker	
2009	Fri os fra det onde	Leif Christensen	
2012	Teddy Bear	Dennis	
2013	Fast & Furious 6	Klaus	
2015	Polish Legends: The Dragon	Wawel Dragon	short
2016	Antboy 3	Commander Combat	
2016	Star Trek Beyond	Zavanko	
2017	Dræberne fra Nibe	Tolder	
2017	Anabolic Life	Peter	
2018	Requiem for a Fighter	Lucas	
2019	6 Underground	Daqeeq	
