= Teddy Bear (2012 film) =

2012 film by Mads Matthiesen

- Film poster
- Directed by: Mads Matthiesen
- Screenplay by: Mads Matthiesen; Martin Zandvliet
- Produced by: Morten Kjems Juhl
- Starring: Kim Kold; Elsebeth Steentoft; Lamaiporn Sangmanee Hougaard; Allan Mogensen; David Winters
- Cinematography: Laust Trier Mørk
- Edited by: Adam Nielsen
- Music by: Sune Martin
- Production companies: SF Film; Beofilm; Tonemestrene Studio; Minerva Film
- Distributed by: SF Studios Danmark
- Release dates: 22 January 2012 (Sundance); 26 January 2012 (Denmark)
- Running time: 93 minutes
- Country: Denmark
- Languages: Danish; English; Thai

Teddy Bear is a 2012 Danish romantic drama film directed by Mads Matthiesen, who co-wrote it with Martin Zandvliet. It stars Kim Kold as a painfully shy bodybuilder in his late 30s who, after failing to find love in his native Denmark, travels to Thailand at the suggestion of his uncle to find love and escape from his overbearing mother.

The film had its world premiere at the Sundance Film Festival on 22 January 2012, where Matthiesen won the World Cinema Directing Award (Dramatic). Four days later, SF Studios gave the film a theatrical release as 10 timer til Paradis (10 Hours to Paradise) in Denmark. It was nominated for the Robert Award for Best Danish Film and the Robert Audience Award. Matthiesen was also nominated for the European Film Award for European Discovery of the Year.

== Plot ==
A 38-eight-year-old Danish bodybuilder named Dennis has never had a girlfriend, despite his impressive physique and likeable personality. He lives with his elderly mother Ingrid, who is possessive of him, in a small town near Copenhagen. Upon arriving home from a date that went wrong, Dennis is questioned by Ingrid on his whereabouts, and tells her that he went to the cinema. Dennis feels even more hopeless about his situation when he discovers that his uncle Bent has married a young Thai woman.

Bent believes that Dennis will have a better chance of finding love abroad and arranges for him to fly to Thailand, with Dennis telling Ingrid that he is going to Germany to compete in a bodybuilding competition. Although the culture shock he experiences in Thailand is daunting, Dennis feels more comfortable after meeting Scott, the middle-aged American man who introduced Bent to his wife. Scott offers to arrange a blind date for Dennis, boosting his confidence, but Dennis later feels uneasy when it becomes apparent that the bar in which the date is to take place is frequented by older men seeking prostitutes employed by Scott. Despite his reservations, Dennis takes one of the prostitutes back to his hotel room, but the artificial nature of the situation makes him hesitant and he rejects her advances.

The next morning, Dennis attends a local gym, where a gymgoer named Prap recognizes him from his bodybuilding career. Dennis notices that his shyness and social ineptitude vanish when he discusses his passion for bodybuilding, and Prap introduces him to Toi, the Thai woman who owns the gym. Though he has more in common with this group of people, Dennis goes back for a second round at the bar and ends up leaving when another prostitute talks to him. He joins Prap and his friends for dinner, where a conversation with Toi sparks an attraction. A day of fun and sightseeing builds up to an evening visit to Toi's apartment, where the two kiss passionately, but Dennis' shyness resurfaces and he abruptly leaves. Realizing that Toi is the only woman with whom he has ever felt a connection, he returns to her apartment, where they embrace and fall asleep in each other's arms without having sex.

With plans for the future, Dennis goes back to Denmark. Unable to lie anymore, he eventually tells Ingrid everything, but she accuses him of being a sex tourist and forbids him from seeing Toi again. He agrees, but secretly arranges for Toi to come to Denmark permanently. He avoids introducing Toi to Ingrid and tells her that the time he spends with his mother is due to her recovering from a heart condition, not because he lives with her, but the charade falls apart when Dennis and Toi happen to cross paths with Ingrid at a shopping mall. Intent on calming Ingrid down, Dennis comes home to find her sitting at the table with an injured hand. He goes to his room, finds its contents destroyed, and silently cries. In the aftermath, it is revealed that Ingrid's insecurities stem from Dennis' alcoholic father leaving her before Dennis was born. Her attempts to play the victim fail as Dennis is now too determined to become independent, so he packs his belongings and kisses her goodbye before getting into a car with Toi, with whom he exchanges a loving look while they drive to their new home.

== Cast ==
- Kim Kold as Dennis
- Elsebeth Steentoft as Ingrid
- Lamaiporn Sangmanee Hougaard as Toi
- David Winters as Scott
- Allan Mogensen as Bent
- Sukunya Mongkol as Phat
- Barbara Zatler as Sasha
- Prap Poramabhuti as Prap
- Sukianya Suwan as Aoi
- John Winters as Jeff (credited as Jonathan Winters)
- Paweena Im-Erb as Nok
- Songporn Na Bangchang as Nuu
- Patrick Johnson as Lars

== Production ==
Teddy Bear was Matthiesen's first feature-length film; it was inspired by his 2007 short film Dennis, which also starred Kold, and was also co-written with Zandvliet. Director Frank Corsaro, after seeing the short film, encouraged Matthiesen to turn it into a full-length film. Matthiesen decided to cast mostly non-actors in the film, in order to give the film as realistic a tone as possible. Kold himself had been a non-actor when Matthiesen cast him in Dennis, although since then he appeared in other films and television shows.

== Release ==
Teddy Bear premiered in the World Cinema Dramatic Competition section of the 28th Sundance Film Festival on 22 January 2012. It was released in Denmark on 26 January 2012. Film Movement acquired North American distribution rights to the film, and gave it a limited release in the United States on 22 August 2012.

== Reception ==
On the review aggregator website Rotten Tomatoes, 94% of 16 critics' reviews are positive, with an average rating of 7.6/10. Metacritic, which uses a weighted average, assigned the film a score of 70 out of 100, based on 9 critics, indicating "generally favorable" reviews.

Manohla Dargis of The New York Times wrote, "It's only to say that the movie's no-frills realism derives from common aesthetic strategies like hand-held cinematography and nonprofessional acting." Dargis also opined, "Although there are times when this world of tight smiles, monstrous maternity and hovering camerawork can feel too familiar, Mr. Matthiesen has a way of consistently and gently upending expectations, sometimes with humor." David Rooney of The Hollywood Reporter stated, "Teddy Bear is not the most substantial film, but it has a restrained charm and an emotional payoff in keeping with its prevailing understatement." Eric Kohn of IndieWire gave the film a B+ rating and commented, "Teddy Bear has a unique strategy for rejuvenating the formula." Dennis Harvey of Variety noted, "The low-key drama is well crafted and likable as far as it goes, but there's not enough narrative impetus or depth to maintain more than passing viewer interest." Harvey also remarked, "Kold is an imposing physical presence — literally heightened by the casting of much shorter actors opposite him — albeit not yet an actor expressive enough to fill the script's hazy psychological gaps by himself."

== Awards and nominations ==
Matthiesen won the directing award in the category "World Cinema - Dramatic" for Teddy Bear at the 2012 Sundance Film Festival. The film was also nominated for the Grand Jury Prize in the same category at the Sundance Festival. It was nominated for the Robert Award for Best Danish Film and the Robert Audience Award. Matthiesen was also nominated for the European Film Award for European Discovery of the Year.
