= Platige Image =

Polish visual arts company

Platige Image S.A.
- Type: Spółka Akcyjna
- Traded as: WSE: PLI
- Industry: Visual effects, CGI animation, Motion pictures, cinematography, cutscenes, animated movies
- Founded: 1997
- Founder: Jarosław Sawko, Piotr Sikora
- Headquarters: Warsaw, Poland
- Key people: Karol Żbikowski (CEO)
- Divisions: Platige Image LLC
- Website: platige.com

Platige Image S.A. is a Polish-based company specializing in the creation of computer graphics, 3D animation, and digital special effects for various fields, including advertising, film, art, education, and entertainment. The studio employs a team of over 320 artists, comprising directors, art directors, graphic designers, and producers. The company has won approximately 280 awards and honors. Its animated shorts have garnered top prizes at SIGGRAPH four times and earned two British Academy of Film and Television Arts (BAFTA) awards. Additionally, the studio has been nominated for the Palme d'Or at the Cannes Film Festival and the Golden Lions at the Venice Film Festival, as well as receiving an Oscar nomination.

== Product divisions ==
=== Commercials ===
Platige Image is a creative studio that has produced over 5,000 commercials for big brands and works with agencies worldwide. The studio also completed numerous campaigns for international markets, including the UK, Portugal, and the US, creating commercials for popular brands like LEGO, Discovery Channel, and History Channel. Platige Image has collaborated with the Australian Tourist Board for a project, providing film and advertising spot-making expertise.

The studio has also worked with luxury car brands like Ferrari, Audi, and Aston Martin, and has produced some of Poland's advertising campaigns, including the Land of Orange series, the Heart and Mind characters, and commercials for beer Zubr in partnership with Kompania Piwowarska.

=== Animation ===
Platige Image has audiences with animated shorts, including cult works, including The Cathedral (2003), Fallen Art (2004), Ark (2007), The Kinematograph (2009) and Paths of Hate (2010). Platige Image has a stereoscopic reconstruction of a destroyed city in City of Ruins (2010) and a stereoscopic interpretation of Jan Matejko's Battle of Grunwald. Platige Image portfolio that includes projects for industries like Activision, Ubisoft, SEGA, and CD Projekt Red. In 2019, Platige Image made Netflix's series Love, Death & Robots, creating Fish Night, directed by Damian Nenow.

=== Film and VFX ===
The studio was involved in VFX work for Lars von Trier's Melancholia (2011) and Antichrist (2009), Jerzy Skolimowski's Essential Killing (2010), Andrzej Wajda's Katyń, and Rafał Wieczyński's Popieluszko. Freedom Is Within Us. Platige provided the visual effects for Lukasz Barczyk and collaborated on the post-production of Agnieszka Smoczynska's Daughters of Dancing (2015). The studio also produced an animated prologue for Patty Jenkins's Wonder Woman in 2017.

A subsidiary company, called Platige Films, was created to extend the feature film and TV production capacities of Platige Image. The first feature produced by the subsidiary is called Another Day of Life. The film, which premiered at the 2018 Cannes Film Festival, earned the studio a European Film Award for Best Animated Film. Platige Image also collaborated with Netflix on The Witcher seasons 1 to 3 and Shadow and Bone season 2.

=== Entertainment ===
The studio's productions include a 3D production, Polita, at Buffo Theater, and musical Pilots at Roma Musical Theater. They have animated the History of Poland, directed by Tomek Baginski; a digital reconstruction of a city destroyed during World War II using stereoscopic technology was created for the Warsaw Rising Museum. Platige created a stereoscopic interpretation of Jan Matejko's painting for the National Museum in Warsaw to commemorate the 600th anniversary of the Battle of Grunwald. The studio also designed the visual concept for the permanent exhibition at the Jozef Pilsudski Museum in Stara Milosna.

Platige Image has collaborated with TVP and Polsat since 2018. Their projects include the design of Polsat Sport's largest sports studio in Poland and the creation of a virtual studio for online events in partnership with Polsat television. In 2018, the studio also designed the visual identity for Wiadomości, the TVP's news program.

=== Events ===
Platige Image has been a partner of UEFA since 2015, when the studio orchestrated opening ceremonies for UEFA Europa League finals.

== History ==
Platige Image was founded by Jarosław Sawko and Piotr Sikora in Warsaw in 1997. The two met in an MBA degree program. They raised start-up capital by selling 300 studio lamps of their own design. The company debuted with VFX work for Justyna Steczkowska's music video, Niekochani (1997). The studio redesigns the visuals for TVP1. Platige received the Golden Eagle Award in 1999 for the redesign. The VFX work for Quo Vadis, directed by Jerzy Kawalerowicz, led to Platige making a special software solely for the purpose of automatic cloning of characters that were to populate the Roman Colosseum depicted in the movie.

In 2004, Platige moved into its new headquarters at Racławicka 99 in Fort Mokotów, one of the forts comprising Fortress Warsaw, a ring of fortifications constructed in the 19th century.

Two years after The Cathedral, Tomek Bagiński released Fallen Art. The short received the Jury Award at the SIGGRAPH festival and the British Academy of Film and Television Arts (BAFTA) award in the Best Short Animation category. Ça Ira, an opera by Roger Waters, had its world premiere in Poznań in 2006. Platige was commissioned by the opera's director, Janusz Józefowicz, to create the visuals for the performance. The resulting two-hour-long animation, composedw of archival footage and animated sequences, was used as the digital set design for the performance. In 2007, Platige released Ark. The movie was shot using MILO Motion control, a system that combined realistic set designs with computer animation. Ark was screened at multiple international movie festivals. In 2009, Rafał Wieczyński's Popiełuszko: Wolność jest w nas and Andrzej Wajda's Katyń were released. The Danish production house Zentropa commissioned Platige Image to do the visual effects for Lars von Trier's Antichrist.

On December 14, 2011, Platige became a publicly traded company by entering the NewConnect stock market. On the day of its stock exchange debut, the price of Platige shares went up by 32.1 percent. A year later, the price of Platige shares (identified by the PLI symbol) has risen by another 76 percent.

In 2012, Platige Image teamed up with Brazilian advertising director Jarbas Angelli and his agency in São Paulo. That same year, Platige produced a cinematic for the game The Witcher 2: Assassins of Kings. Platige premiered their largest film project yet, The Hero and Message, during Qatar's National Day celebration on 18 December 2012. This 25-minute animation was created in just six months and consisted of over 500 shots, made for Qatar's government agency. The studio released another cinematic for CD Projekt RED's game, Cyberpunk 2077, in January 2013. In 2014, Platige Image released their first in-house mobile game and the start of production on the feature-length animated film, Another Day of Life. Platige worked on a Nike promo featuring Cristiano Ronaldo and the European Space Agency's Rosetta mission Ambition spot.

The COVID-19 pandemic led Platige to focus on graphic design projects for the gaming industry, including producing cinematics for the Call of Duty series in collaboration with Activision. The company is also developing a strategy for the next 5 years, which includes plans to expand into the US and MENA (Middle East and North Africa) markets, among others. During Platige's 25th anniversary, Platige prepared a 9-minute film as well as 60, 30, and 15-second commercials. The company also produced commercials for Qantas.

== Capital Group ==
The Platige Image Group Companies consists of:

- DOBRO sp. z o.o.
  A Warsaw-based entity specializes in film production and organization of film sets.
- Platige Films sp. z o.o.
  Headquartered in Warsaw, engages in self-production of film projects and intellectual property management.
- Fatima Film sp. z o.o. and Fatima Film sp. z o.o. sp. k.
  Both based in Warsaw, were acquired by the Issuer, which now holds 100% of the capital of Fatima sp. z o.o.
- Platige sp. z o.o. and Platige sp. z o.o. sp. k.
  Headquarters in Warsaw. The Issuer has acquired 100% of the share capital of Platige sp. z o.o. with a value of 5,000zł. Platige sp. z o.o. is the only limited partner of Platige sp. z o.o. sp. k.
- IMAGE GAMES S.A.
  Based in Warsaw, it has a share capital of 106,444.5zł, with the Issuer holding 24.43% of the total number of votes.
- PJ GAMES sp. z o.o.
  Headquarters in Warsaw. The share capital of PJ GAMES sp. z o.o. is 105,000zł, of which 80% is subscribed by the Issuer and 20% by Juggler Games sp. z o.o.
- PLATIGE INC.
  Represents Platige Image S.A. in the United States.
- PLATIGE US LLC.
  Represents Platige Image S.A. in the United States. Platige INC. holds 75% of the capital and voting shares of Platige US LLC.

== Key projects ==
=== Commercials ===
Date	Brand/Title	Agency
1998	Empik	
2000	No to Frugo	PZL
2003–2013	Żubr	PZL
2005–2013	LEGO	
2006	Galp balloons	
2007	What a Channel	
2007	Goplana	GPD Advertising
2007–2012	Listerine	JWT
2007–2013	Tesco	PZL
2009	LECH Run	
2010	Super Bock Dragon	
2010–2013	Kellog's	Leo Burnett London
2011–2012	Kraina Orange	Leo Burnett
2011–2012	CYFRA+ (Lemur)	Change Integrated, Saatchi & Saatchi
2011–2013	TP SA Heart and Mind	Publicis

=== Short animated films ===
Date	Title	Director
2002	The Cathedral	Tomasz Bagiński
2003	Undo	Marcin Waśko
2004	Fallen Art	Tomasz Bagiński
2007	Ark	Grzegorz Jonkajtys
2006	Moloch	Marcin Pazera
2006	The Great Escape	Damian Nenow
2008	Chick	Michał Socha
2008	Teaching Infinity	Jakub Jabłoński, Bartosz Kik
2009	The Kinematograph	Tomasz Bagiński
2010	Paths of Hate	Damian Nenow
2019	Fish Night - Love, Death & Robots, Volume 1	Damian Nenow

=== Other animated productions ===
Date	Title	Director
2010	Polish Cinematography PISF	Paweł Borowski
2011	National Forum of Music	-
2011	DREAM 2030	Grzegorz Jonkajtys
2012	Catzilla	Jakub Jabłoński, Bartłomiej Kik
2012	Hero and Message	Paweł Borowski

=== Stage productions ===
Date	Title	Director
2006	Mr Kleks’ Academy	Wojciech Kępczyński
2006	Ca Ira	Janusz Józefowicz
2008	Seven Gates of Jerusalem	Krzysztof Jasiński
2009	Remember. Katyń 1940.	Konrad Smuga
2009	Tristan	Krzysztof Pastor
2011	Move Your Imagination	Tomasz Bagiński
2011	Polita	Janusz Józefowicz

=== Cultural heritage productions ===
Date	Title	Director
2010	Animated History of Poland	Tomasz Bagiński
2010	Animated Guide to Polish Success	Rafał Wojtunik
2010	Jan Matejko's Battle of Grunwald 3D	Tomasz Bagiński
2010	The City of Ruins	Damian Nenow
2011	Museum of Polish History	Krzysztof Noworyta

=== Cinematics ===
Date	Title	Director
2007	The Witcher (intro and outro)	Tomasz Bagiński
2008	The Witcher. Rise of the White Wolf	Tomasz Bagiński
2011	The Witcher 2: Assassins of Kings	Tomasz Bagiński
2013	Cyberpunk 2077	Tomasz Bagiński
2013	The Witcher 3: Wild Hunt	Tomasz Bagiński

== Awards ==
The Cathedral	SIGGRAPH	Best Animated Short	2002
The Cathedral	animago AWARD	Grand Prix	2002
The Cathedral	75th Academy Awards	Nomination in the category: Short Film (Animated)	2003
Undo	animago AWARD	Best Animated Short	2003
Fallen Art	animago AWARD	2nd place	2005
Fallen Art	SIGGRAPH	Jury Honors	2005
MOLOCH	animago AWARD	Professional/Animation Short Film	2006
Fallen Art	BAFTA	Best short animated film	2006
Ark	SIGGRAPH	Best of Show Award	2007
Ark	Cannes Film Festival	Nomination in the category: Short film	2007
The Witcher intro	VES Awards	Nomination in the category: Outstanding pre-rendered Visuals in a video game	2007
What a Channel	animago AWARD	Best Idea	2008
The Kinematographer	animago AWARD	Best Short Film	2009
Seven Gates of Jerusalem	The International Emmy Awards	Nomination in the category: Arts Programming	2009
Animated History of Poland	animago AWARD	Best Visualisation	2010
Paths of Hate	VES Awards	Nomination in the category: Outstanding Achievement in an Animated Short	2011
The City of Ruins	VES Awards	Nomination in the category: Outstanding Visual Effects in a Special Venue Project	2011
Paths of Hate	SIGGRAPH	Jury Award	2011
Paths of Hate	Comic-Con IIFF	Jury Award	2011
Paths of Hate	Comic-Con IIFF	Best Animation	2011
The Witcher 2: Assassins of Kings	Golden Trailer Awards	Best Video Game Trailer	2012
The Witcher 2: Assassins of Kings	London International Awards	Golden Statue in the category: TV/Cinema/Online Film – Production and Post Production; subcategory: Animation	2012
