= Vanessa Aleksander =

Polish actress (born 1996)

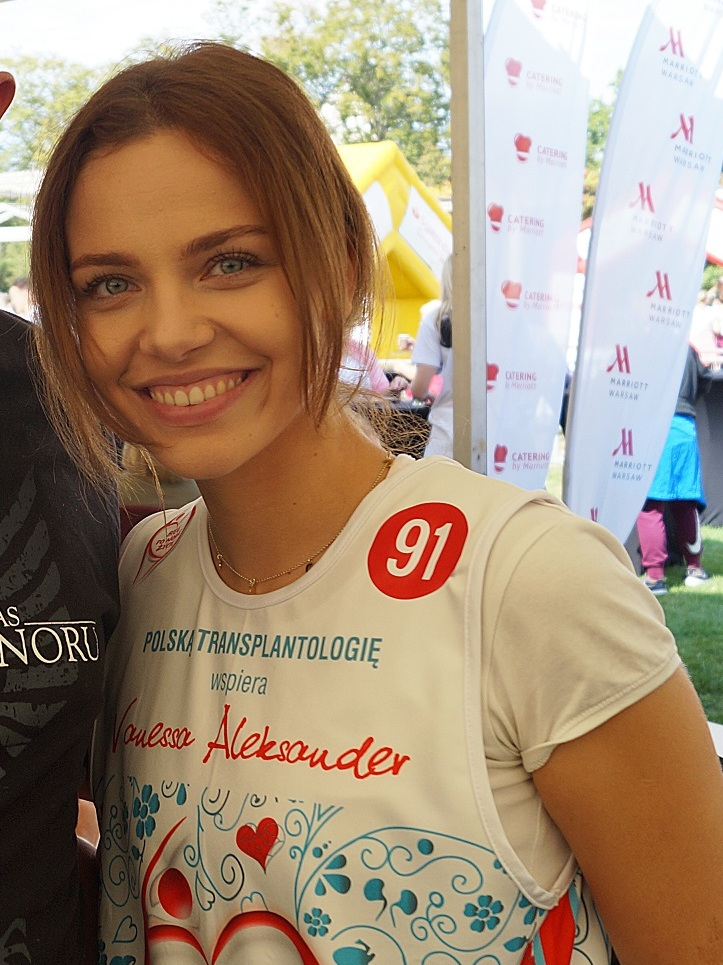
- Aleksander in 2019
- Born: 16 September 1996 (age 30)
- Education: National Academy of Dramatic Art
- Occupation: Actress
- Years active: 2014–present

Vanessa Aleksander (born 16 September 1996) is a Polish actress.

== Biography ==
Aleksander was born to a Polish father and a Slovak mother; her parents are both figure skaters. Her maternal grandparents live in Zohor, a small village near Bratislava.

She graduated from Batory High School and planned on studying architecture and interior design in London, but changed her plans when she was accepted to the National Academy of Dramatic Art in Warsaw. After graduating, she began acting full-time at the Teatr Współczesny.

In 2024, she competed on the 28th season of Dancing with the Stars. Taniec z gwiazdami and won the title with partner Michał Bartkiewicz.

== Filmography ==
=== Film ===
Year	Title	Role	Notes	Ref.
2015	Polish Legends: The Dragon	Ola	Short film	
2020	The Hater	Gabi Krasucka		
2021	Letters to Santa 4	Monika		
2022	Marzec '68	Hania Bielska		
2023	Też to słyszycie	Martyna	Short film	
2024	Bonus Trip	Maya		
2025	The Curse	Anastazja		
2026	King of Dope	Paula		

=== Television ===
Year	Title	Role	Notes	Ref.
2014	Father Matthew	Ala	Episode: "Kurtka"	
2015	Family.pl	Edyta	Episode: "Sprzątanie"	
2016	Na noże	Justyna	7 episodes	
2017	Belle Époque	Mila	10 episodes	
2017–2022	Wartime Girls	Ewa Fronczak	54 episodes	
2019	Ultraviolet	Lila	1 episode	
2020	Mały zgon	Nina	1 episode	
2021–2024	The Mire	Joanna Drewicz	2 episodes	
2021–present	The Office PL	Patrycja Kowalska	Main role	
2022–2023	Krucjata	Maria Darska	13 episodes	
2023	A Girl and an Astronaut	Young Marta Rybicka	6 episodes	
2023	Kres niewinności	Hania Bielska	4 episodes	
2023	Krew	Laura Gajewska	3 episodes	
