= Mr. Zoob =

Polish alternative rock band

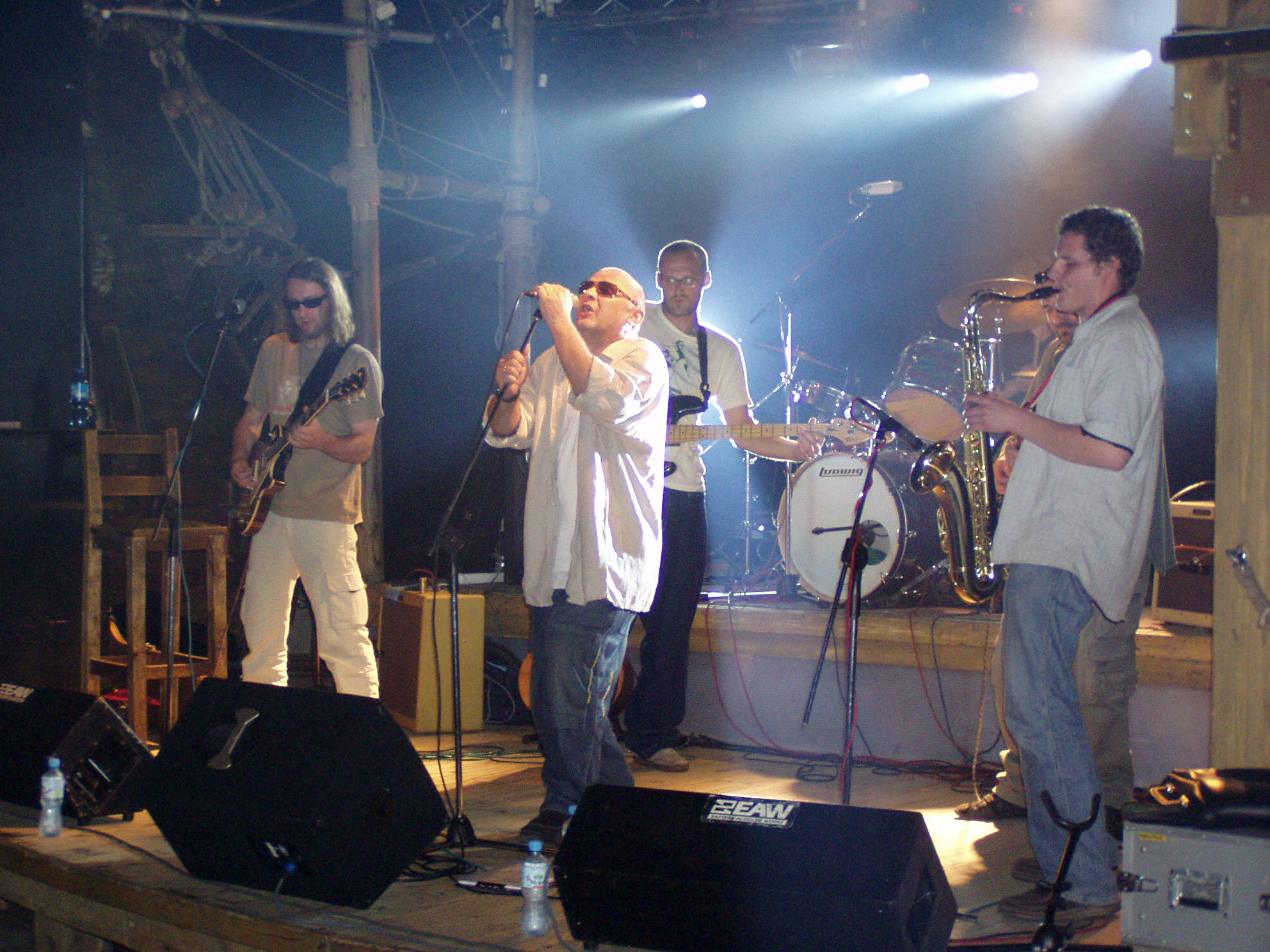
- Mr. Zoob members in 2005

Background information
- Origin: Koszalin, Poland
- Genres: Alternative rock; rock music; reggae; ska
- Years active: 1983–1986, 1993–present
- Members: Waldemar Miszczor; Grzegorz Jóźwik; Arkadiusz Wójcik; Jacek Paprocki; Artur Orłowski; Radek Czerwiński; Andrzej Donarski
- Website: mrzoob.pl

Mr. Zoob (alternative spellings: Mr Zoob, Mr Z'OOB, Mr Z'oob) is an alternative rock band formed in Koszalin, Poland in 1983. The band's music is a mix of rock music, reggae, ska and its characteristic thanks to sound of stertorous saxophone.

== Discography ==
=== Albums ===
- To tylko ja (1986)
- Czego się gapisz (1998)
- Kawałek podłogi – Od początku (2008)
- Rock & skaczące piosenki (2008)

=== Singles ===
- "A ja się śmieję w głos" (1984)
- "Yeti" (1984)
- "Nie, nie kochaj mnie" (1985)
- "Tylko jeden krok" (1985)
- "Mój jest ten kawałek podłogi"
- "Krzysiek – Zdzisiek"
- "Zęby" (1996)
- "Ja tu czekam"
- "To nie jest Ameryka"
- "Kto to jest" (2005)
- "Moja głowa"
- "Dotykaj mnie" (2009)
- "PESEL" (2010)
- "Słońca tylko brak" (2010)
- "Piosenka o nieszkodliwości" (2010)
- "Dotyka mnie"

=== Compilations ===
- Sztuka latania (1985) (Savitor SVT015)
