= A Girl and an Astronaut =

Polish sci-fi romance television series

- Promotional poster
- Polish: Dziewczyna i kosmonauta
- Genre: Sci-fi; Romance; Drama
- Created by: Bartek Prokopowicz; Jakub Korolczuk
- Screenplay by: Agata Malesińska
- Directed by: Bartek Prokopowicz
- Starring: Vanessa Aleksander; Jędrzej Hycnar; Jakub Sasak; Magdalena Cielecka; Andrzej Chyra
- Composer: Maciek Dobrowolski
- Country of origin: Poland
- Original languages: Polish; Russian; English
- No. of seasons: 1
- No. of episodes: 6

Production
- Producers: Olga Cerkaska; Bartosz Cerkaski
- Cinematography: Jeremi Prokopowicz
- Running time: 44–51 minutes
- Production company: Lulu Production

Original release
- Network: Netflix
- Release: 17 February 2023

A Girl and an Astronaut (Polish: Dziewczyna i kosmonauta) is a Polish sci-fi drama romance television series created by Netflix, based on an idea by Bartek Prokopowicz and Jakub Korolczuk.

== Synopsis ==
It is 2022, and Niko is a young arrogant fighter pilot who gets the opportunity of a lifetime: to go into outer space in a Russian capsule for 24 hours, as part of a private experiment on human cryopreservation. He is madly in love with Marta, who is equally pursued by Niko's best friend, Bogdan. Shortly after being launched into orbit, Niko begins to hallucinate and accidentally sets the capsule timer for thirty years, immediately going into sub-hibernation.

In 2052, Marta is married to Bogdan, and they have a daughter, Oliwia. One day, Niko's capsule reappears in the sky and lands in the ocean. SkyCOMM, the Russian company that launched him into space, retrieves it and brings it back to Russia. There, Nadia, who thirty years before was a seven-year-old girl whose grandfather was the doctor in charge of Niko's health and training, now suffers from ALS and wants to use Niko's stem cells to find a cure.

Marta travels to Russia to bring Niko, who hasn't aged, back home, but is prevented from doing so by the Russians. Niko eventually escapes, with SkyCOMM operatives in pursuit.

== Cast and characters ==
- Vanessa Aleksander as young Marta
- Jędrzej Hycnar as Niko
- Jakub Sasak as young Bogdan
- Magdalena Cielecka as Marta
- Andrzej Chyra as Bogdan
- Zofia Jastrzębska as young Karolina
- Anna Cieślak as Karolina
- Daria Polunina as Nadia
- Andrew Zhuravsky as JJ
- Grzegorz Damięcki as Wiktor Rosa
- Helena Rząsa as Oliwia
