= Mathéo Moussa =

Gabonese footballer

Personal information
- Date of birth: 14 November 2005 (age 20)
- Place of birth: Dijon, France
- Height: 1.83 m (6 ft 0 in)
- Position: Centre-back

Team information
- Current team: Bastia II
- Number: 80

Youth career
- Dijon

Senior career*
Years	Team	Apps	(Gls)
2024–2025	Dijon II	18	(0)
2024–2025	Dijon	10	(0)
2025–	Bastia II	1	(0)

International career^{‡}
2025–	Gabon	1	(0)
- * Club domestic league appearances and goals as of 17:15, 27 August 2025 (UTC) ‡ National team caps and goals as of 17:15, 27 August 2025 (UTC)

Mathéo Moussa (born 14 November 2005) is a professional footballer who plays as a centre-back for Bastia II. Born in France, he plays for the Gabon national team.

== Club career ==
A youth product of Dijon, Moussa joined their senior team in 2024. In June 2025, he transferred to Bastia where he was first assigned to their reserves.

== International career ==
Born in France, Moussa is of Gabonese and Comorian descent. He was called up to the Gabon national team for a set of friendlies in June 2025. He debuted with the Gabon in a friendly 4–3 loss to Niger on 6 June 2025.
