= Fallen Art =

- Original poster
- Directed by: Tomasz Bagiński
- Written by: Tomasz Bagiński
- Produced by: Jarek Sawko; Piotr Sikora; Tomasz Bagiński
- Starring: Arkadiusz Jakubik; Marcin Kudelka; Dariusz Toczek
- Music by: Fanfare Ciocărlia
- Release date: 2004
- Running time: 6 minutes
- Country: Poland
- Language: Polish

Fallen Art (Polish Sztuka spadania, lit. The Art of Falling) is a six-minute, animated short film written and directed by Tomasz Bagiński. It features Romanian band Fanfare Ciocărlia's song "Asfalt Tango." The film was produced and created by Platige Image, a VFX company. Fallen Art received the Jury Honors at the SIGGRAPH 2005 Computer Animation Festival, and in 2006, it received the British Academy of Film and Television Arts Award.

== Summary ==
The short opens on a platoon of soldiers awaiting their sergeant's instructions at the top of a ramshackle tower. When the order is given from below, he calls up a single soldier, proudly awards him a medal, and then pushes him off the edge to fall in a particular position onto an asphalt square. A photograph of the corpse is then brought to the leader of the operation; a retired musician, revealed to be commissioning the macabre photographs as individual frames of a deranged stop-motion project depicting a soldier dancing to one of his songs. He runs the unfinished animation in front of an empty theatre, tearfully reliving his glory days before sobering up and giving the go-ahead for the next "frame" to be produced.
