= Elżbieta Cherezińska =

Polish acclaimed writer

Elżbieta Cherezińska (born October 9, 1972 in Piła) is a Polish writer, theatrologist, specializing in historical novels.

== Life ==
Graduate of the Department of Theater Knowledge at the Aleksander Zelwerowicz National Academy of Dramatic Art in Warsaw. She made her literary debut in 2005 with a book co-written with Shevah Weiss, Z jednej strony, z drugiej strony (On the One Side, On the Other Side), which is the only literary biography of this former Israeli ambassador to Poland. Since 2008 she has been associated with the Zysk i S-ka publishing house. Published by an American Tor Books in 2021, the Widow Queen (Harda, 2016) is her first novel to be translated into English. She currently resides on the Baltic coast in Kołobrzeg.

== Selected works ==
- Z jednej strony, z drugiej strony co-written with Shevah Weiss, Prószyński i S-ka (2005)
- Byłam sekretarką Rumkowskiego. Dzienniki Etki Daum, Zysk i S-ka (2008)
- Gra w kości, Zysk i S-ka (2010), published in Czech under the name Hra o kosti (2017)
- Legion, Zysk i S-ka (2013)
- Turniej cieni, Zysk i S-ka (2015)
- Sydonia. Słowo się rzekło. Zysk i S-ka (2023)

=== The Northern Road series ===
- Saga Sigrun, Zysk i S-ka (2009)
- Ja jestem Halderd, Zysk i S-ka (2010)
- Pasja według Einara, Zysk i S-ka (2011)
- Trzy młode pieśni, Zysk i S-ka (2012)

=== The Reborn Kingdom series ===
- Korona śniegu i krwi, Zysk i S-ka (2012)
- Niewidzialna korona, Zysk i S-ka (2014)
- Płomienna korona, Zysk i S-ka (2017)
- Wojenna korona, Zysk i S-ka (2019)
- Odrodzone królestwo, Zysk i S-ka (2020)

=== The Bold series ===
- Harda, Zysk i S-ka (2016), published in English by Tor Books under the name The Widow Queen (2021), published in Czech under the name Hrdá (2022)
- Królowa, Zysk i S-ka (2016), published in English by Tor Books under the name The Last Crown (2022)

== Prizes and awards ==
In 2013, she reached the finals of the Gryfia National Literary Award for Women Authors for Korona śniegu i krwi.

In 2014 Niewidzialna korona quickly gained recognition from readers, becoming the "hottest book of the summer" in a poll by TVP Kultura.

In January 2014, Magazyn Literacki Książki named the Legion the 2013 Book of the Year.

In 2018, she received the Annual Award of the Ministry of Culture and National Heritage from Minister of Culture and National Heritage Piotr Gliński in the Literature category.

In 2024 Sydonia. Słowo się rzekło won the 2023 Lubimyczytac.pl Book of the Year Poll in the Historical Novel category.

== References in art and culture ==
The heavy metal group M.o.s.s.a.D (Masters of speed strength and Disorder) has recorded the song King (Król) based on Korona śniegu i ognia.
