= Brazilian Zouk =

Subclass of dance

Brazilian Zouk is a partner dance which began in Brazil during the early 1990s. Brazilian Zouk evolved from the partner dance known as the Lambada. Over time, Zouk dancers have experimented and incorporated other styles of music into such as R'n'B, pop, hip hop and contemporary.

== History ==
Brazilian Zouk evolved from the partner dance known as the Lambada. As the Lambada music genre went out of fashion, Lambada dancers turned to Zouk (from the francophone, Caribbean Islands) as their music of choice. It was this transition that birthed the dance known as Brazilian Zouk. The term "Brazilian Zouk" was adopted in order to distinguish the dance style from the musical genre. Nowadays the term "Zouk" is commonly used to refer to the "Brazilian Zouk" dance style.

== Features ==
Brazilian Zouk is a dance with well-defined basic steps and rhythmic patterns. The representation of these steps and rhythmic patterns varies depending on the substyle of Zouk. The overall plasticity of the movements and the range of musical genres it is danced to make Brazilian Zouk a partner dance that caters to creativity and improvisation.

The most characteristic feature of Brazilian Zouk is the follower's upper body movements, which are led out of axis by intricate leading and following techniques. Other features include body isolations, tilted turns and more recently counter-balance techniques.

== Styles ==
As Brazilian Zouk made a name for itself in the dance community talented and influential dancers began to develop and explore to create more definitive styles, either by sheer development as a Zouk school, or by fusing Zouk with other dance styles such as Bachata, Salsa, Argentinian Tango, Contact Improvisation or West Coast Swing.

As of 2019, two of the most popular branches of Brazilian Zouk are Traditional (Rio) and Lamba. Several styles of Brazilian Zouk have evolved, and the dances continue to evolve as Zouk gains popularity around the world. Styles that are presented at dance schools outside Brazil include:

- Traditional Zouk (or Rio-style Zouk) created by Adilio Porto (Zoukcreator) and Renata Pecanha is a style of Brazilian Zouk that can be both linear and circular, and contains a set of elements or basic patterns that are known under a certain name (in Portuguese), like Basic, Lateral, Viradinha, Elástico, and Bonus
- Lamba Zouk (or Zouk lambada, or Porto Seguro style) has the closest connection to Lambada. It is characterized by constant, nonstop movement, unlike the Traditional style.
- Mzouk is the only style originated outside of Brazil in Mallorca, Spain. Mzouk defines its basic steps and movements by nomenclature rather than preset patterns. This means that patterns can be defined as a sequence of specific movements.
- Soulzouk is Zouk style created in Rio de Janeiro by a Zouk dancer named China (now written "Xina"). Soulzouk is based on the biomechanic of body movements and also on mutual understanding to have a more organic and natural dance; both the leader and the follower are taking active parts in creating the dance. In its beginning, Soulzouk was seen as a different way of dancing Zouk because it was using close embrace and more connection. At that time, it was something seen with a lot of judgments as it was outside the habits of the dance scene.
- Zouk Flow created by Arknjo 20 years ago at Rio de Janeiro, is a style influenced by urban dances Culture. such uses a Hip-Hop synergy and is natural characterised movements by of this the energy body to create steps.
- Neozouk is a style of basically circular movements and a philosophy about the energy management of these, developed by DJ, dancer, teacher and producer Mafie Zouker, from Rio de Janeiro and her partner Ruanita Santos, now based in Holland.

Many professional Zouk dancers are creating and naming new sub-styles influenced by contemporary dance, hip-hop dance and others.

== International reception ==
Although the Zouk dance form originated in Brazil, it is not as typically danced there as other popular forms, like Forró or Samba. While Zouk is rooted in a mixture of Brazilian and African musical and dance forms (primarily Lambada, a dance that was popularized in Brazil in the 1980s), it is increasingly popular outside of Brazil. The majority of Zouk events taking place outside of Brazil occur in Europe and the United States, but also occur in Asia and Latin America. Well-known Zouk events include Brazilian Zouk Jack and Jill Competitions, which are organized worldwide by the Brazilian Zouk Dance Council, The International Zouk Congress, and multiple national Zouk Festival events, which have taken place all over the world. Some of the most well-known zouk dancers include Kadu Pires & Larissa Thayane (both Brazilian), Anderson Mendes & Brenda Carvalho (Brazilian and Brazilian-Peruvian), Renata Peçanha (Brazilian), William Teixera & Paloma Alves (Brazilian-Spanish and Brazilian), and others.
