= Filip Bobek =

Polish actor

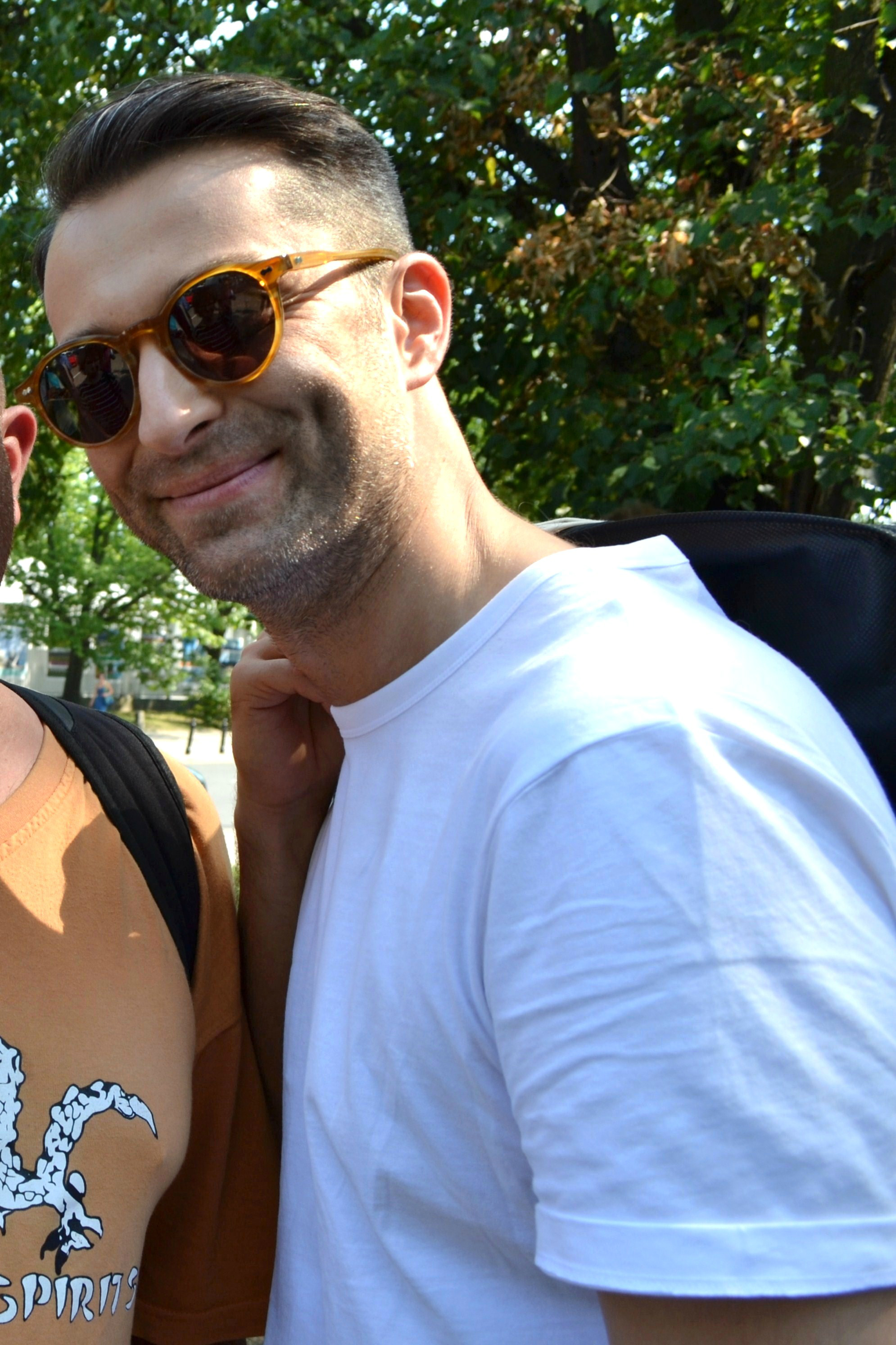
- Filip Andrzej Bobek
- Born: 9 October 1980 (age 45); Gdańsk, Poland
- Occupation: Actor
- Years active: 1999-present

Filip Andrzej Bobek (born 9 October 1980 in Gdańsk) is a Polish actor, best known for his role of the main love interest in BrzydUla.

He studied at the National Academy of Dramatic Art in Warsaw. He began his career by starring in short films of chemical experiments, included in school textbooks, and in an advertisement for the chocolate bar Prince Polo involving time travel to the People's Republic of Poland.

== Filmography ==
Film
Year	Title	Role	Notes
2007	Ranczo Wilkowyje	Flower deliverer	
2010	Weekend	Playboy	
2011	80 Million	Władysław Frasyniuk	
2011	Suicide Room	Marcin	
2015	Wkręceni 2	Leo Brant	

Television
Year	Title	Role	Notes
2005	Kryminalni	Piotr Konopka	Episode: "Wypadek"
2005	Magda M.	Marcin Kołodziejczyk	Episode 15
2005	Na dobre i na złe	Mateusz	Episode: "Wesele w Leśnej Górze"
2006	Daleko od noszy	Patient	Episode: "Leczenie eksperymentalne"
2006	Na Wspólnej	"Długi"	Episode 662
2006	Pensjonat pod Różą	Robert	2 episodes
2006–2007	Kopciuszek	Maks	
2006	Egzamin z życia	Music TV journalist	2 episodes
2006	Oficerowie	Soundman	4 episodes
2008–2009	BrzydUla	Marek Dobrzański	Main role
2008–2009	Barwy szczęścia	Artistic director	13 episodes
2010–2011	Prosto w serce	Artur Sagowski	Main role
2010	Hotel 52	Dr Hubert Dębski	3 episodes
2010	Klub szalonych dziewic	Dawid Rietman	Recurring role
2012	Czas honoru	Gustaw	7 episodes
2012	Komisarz Alex	Filip Miler	Episode: "Mordercze lato"
2012–2013	Hotel 52	Tomasz Rosiecki	Series regular
2013	2XL	Albert Bielewicz	Series regular
2013	Ojciec Mateusz	Wojtek Dereń	Episode: "Laweciarze"
2014–2015	Friends	Szymon	Recurring role
2015–2016	Singielka	Mikołaj Suszyński	Series regular
2016	Bodo	Aleksander Żabczyński	Episode 12
2018	Komisarz Alex	Michał Przybysz	Episode: "Wszystko w rodzinie"
2018–present	Na dobre i na złe	Dr Marcin Molenda	Series regular
2018–present	W rytmie serca	Piotr Nowacki	Series regular

== Awards ==
- Telekamery Award for Best Actor (2010)
- Viva! Najpiękniejsi Award for Most Handsome Polish Man (2010)
- Oskary Fashion Award for Best Dressed Polish Actor (2011)
