= Sanah =

Sanah is a feminine given name. Notable people with the name include:

- Sanah (singer) (born 1997), Polish singer and songwriter
- Sanah Moidutty (born 1991), Indian singer and songwriter
- Sanah Mollo (born 1987), South African women's footballer
