= Majka Jeżowska =

Polish singer (born 1960)

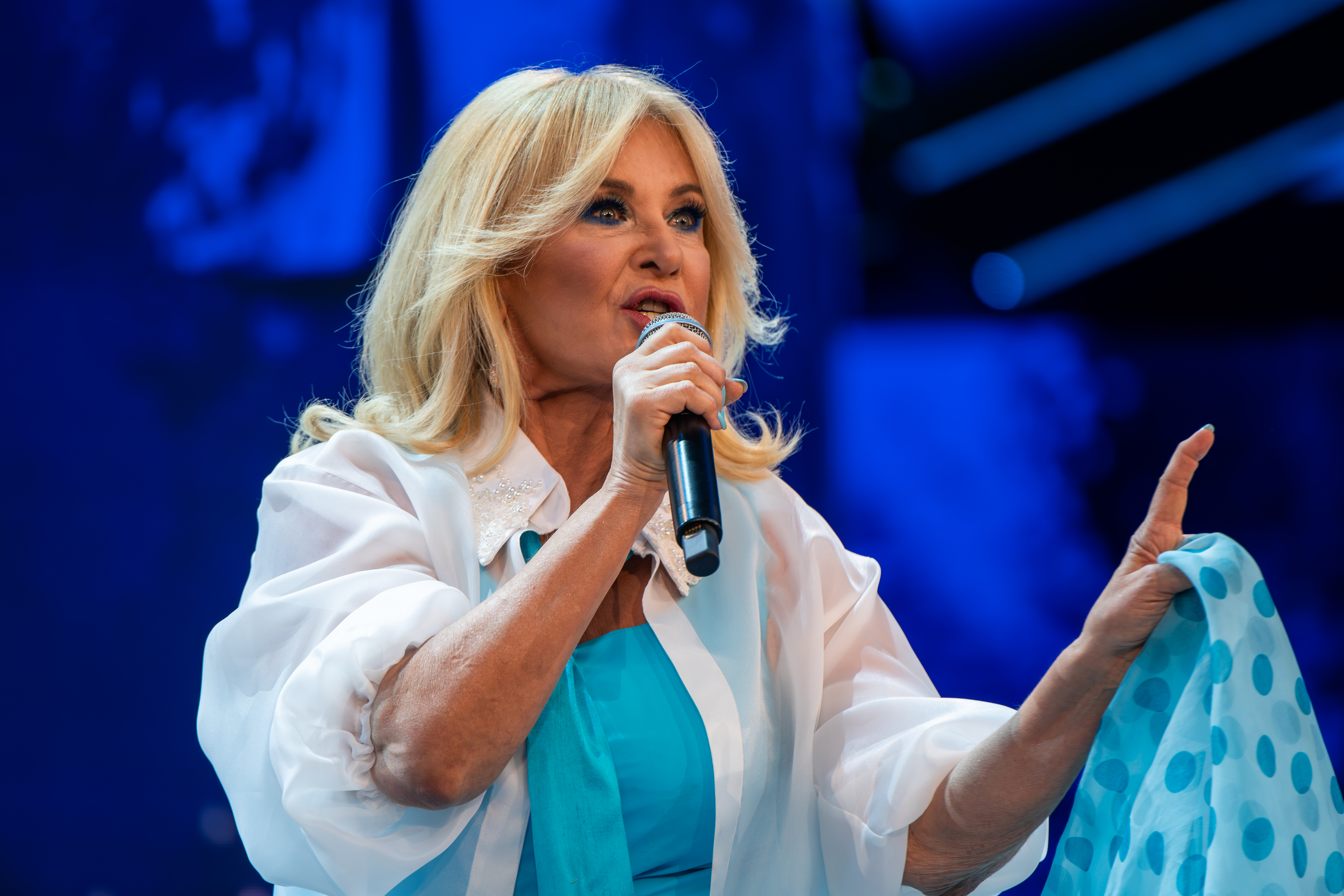
- Majka Jeżowska in 2025

Background information
- Born: Maria Jeżowska; May 25, 1960 (age 66); Nowy Sącz, Poland
- Genres: Pop, children's music
- Occupations: singer, actress
- Years active: 1978–present
- Labels: Wifon, Tonpress, Polskie Nagrania Muza, JaMajka Music

Majka Jeżowska (born Maria Jeżowska on May 25, 1960 in Nowy Sącz, Poland), is a Polish singer performing pop and children's music. She is also a part-time actress.

== Biography ==
She graduated from the Karol Szymanowski Academy of Music in Katowice, supervised by Krystyna Prońko. In 1978, she won an award at the festival in Zielona Góra, and in 1979, was awarded again at the National Festival of Polish Song in Opole for the song "Nutka w nutkę". The following year, her song "Reggae o pierwszych wynalazcach" (Reggae about first inventors) took the third place at the festival in Opole. She released her debut album, Jadę w świat, in 1981, which apart from previously known songs included further hits "Od rana mam dobry humor" (I'm in good mood since morning) and "Najpiękniejsza w klasie" (Most beautiful in class). The singer subsequently emigrated to the United States, where she married in 1982. She was a member of a rock group Heat N Serve, with which she had a minor hit "Rats on a Budget" in 1984.

Jeżowska simultaneously continued musical career in Poland, where she achieved success with songs "Papierowy man" and "Mały Piccolo" in 1985. In the same year, her song "A ja wolę moją mamę", based on a children's poem by Agnieszka Osiecka, became a radio hit, and the singer released an album of the same title in 1986. It consisted entirely of children's song and was met with modest success. Her second adult pop album, Wibracje, was released in 1987. At the festival in Opole in 1988, she won the first award for the song "Odkąd zjawił się Edek", and a special award at the same festival in 1991 for "Za daleko do Chicago". In 1993, her song "Kolor serca" promoted the Great Orchestra of Christmas Charity.

In 1994, having permanently settled back in Poland, she founded her own record label, JaMajka Music, and released another album with children's music, Kolorowe dzieci, followed by an album of Polish Christmas carols Zimowe obrazki in 1995, and Kochaj czworonogi in 1997. She has been awarded with the Order of the Smile and is a Goodwill Ambassador for UNICEF.

== Discography ==
- 1981: Jadę w świat (I'm going into the world)
- 1986: A ja wolę moją mamę (I prefer my mother)
- 1987: Wibracje (Vibrations)
- 1990: The Best of Majka
- 1994: Kolorowe dzieci (Colourful children)
- 1995: Zimowe obrazki (Images of winter)
- 1997: Kochaj czworonogi (Love four-legged creatures)
- 1998: Królestwo zielonej polany (Kingdom of green glade)
- 2000: Najpiękniejsza w klasie – Złota kolekcja (The most beautiful in class - golden collection)
- 2003: Marzenia się spełniają (Dreams come true)
- 2009: Rytm i melodia (Rhythm and melody)
