= Katarzyna Sobczyk =

Polish singer

- Born: Kazimiera Sobczyk; February 21, 1945; Tyczyn, Poland
- Died: July 28, 2010 (aged 65) Warsaw-Ursynów, Poland
- Genres: Pop, big beat
- Occupation: Singer
- Years active: 1964–2010

Katarzyna Sobczyk (21 February 1945 – 28 July 2010) was a Polish singer. She was born as Kazimiera Sobczyk in Tyczyn, Poland. From 1964 to 1972, she was a member of the band Czerwono-Czarni.

Later she and her husband Henryk Fabian were vocalists in the band Wiatraki. She died from breast cancer in a hospice in Warsaw-Ursynów on 28 July 2010, aged 65.

== Awards ==
- 1964 – National Festival of Polish Song in Opole, award for the song "O mnie się nie martw"
- 1965 – National Festival of Polish Song in Opole, award for the song "Nie wiem czy warto"
- 1966 – National Festival of Polish Song in Opole, award for the song "Nie bądź taki szybki Bill"
- 1967 –s National Festival of Polish Song in Opole, award for the song "Trzynastego"

== Well-known songs ==
- "Mały książę" (lyr. Krzysztof Dzikowski, mus. Ryszard Poznakowski)
- "Nie bądź taki szybki Bill" (lyr. Ludwik Jerzy Kern, mus. Jerzy Matuszkiewicz)
- "O mnie się nie martw" (lyr. Kazimierz Winkler, mus. Józef Krzeczek)
- "Biedroneczki są w kropeczki" (lyr. Agnieszka Feill, Artur Tur, mus. Adam Markiewicz)
- "Nie wiem, czy to warto" (lyr. Krzysztof Dzikowski, mus. Zbigniew Bizoń)
- "Trzynastego" (lyr. Janusz Kondratowicz, mus. Ryszard Poznakowski)
- "Był taki ktoś" (lyr. Krzysztof Dzikowski, mus. Mateusz Święcicki)
- "To nie grzech" (lyr. Andrzej Kudelski, mus. Krzysztof Sadowski Snr.)
- "Cztery maki" (lyr. Krzysztof Dzikowski, mus. Mateusz Święcicki)
