= EWZ =

EWZ may refer to:

- EWZ Bridge over East Channel of Laramie River, United States historic place in Wyoming
- EWZ, sometimes stylized as ewz, abbreviation of Elektrizitätswerk der Stadt Zürich, Swiss power company, operator of hydroelectric power plants in Val Bregaglia
- EW Zaragoza, Spanish water polo club
- Econet Wireless Zimbabwe, official name of telecommunications company Econet Zimbabwe
- EWZ, ICAO code for East Wing (Kazakhstan), a Kazakhstan private airline
- European War Zone, area in alternate history novel Xavras Wyżryn
- EWZ, abbreviation of winwanderungszentralstelle, a Nazi Germany term for Central Immigration Office
- EWZ, NYSE Arca code for iShares MSCI Brazil Index, an American exchange-traded fund
