= Nicholas Hunt (disambiguation) =

Nicholas Hunt was Commander-in-Chief Fleet.

Nicholas Hunt may also refer to:

- Nicky Hunt (Nicholas Brett Hunt), English footballer
- Nicholas de Hunt, MP for Coventry
- Nicholas Hunt, character in Charne oceany

== See also ==
- Nicky Hunt (archer) (Nicola Hunt), archer
