= Pauline Étienne =

Belgian actress

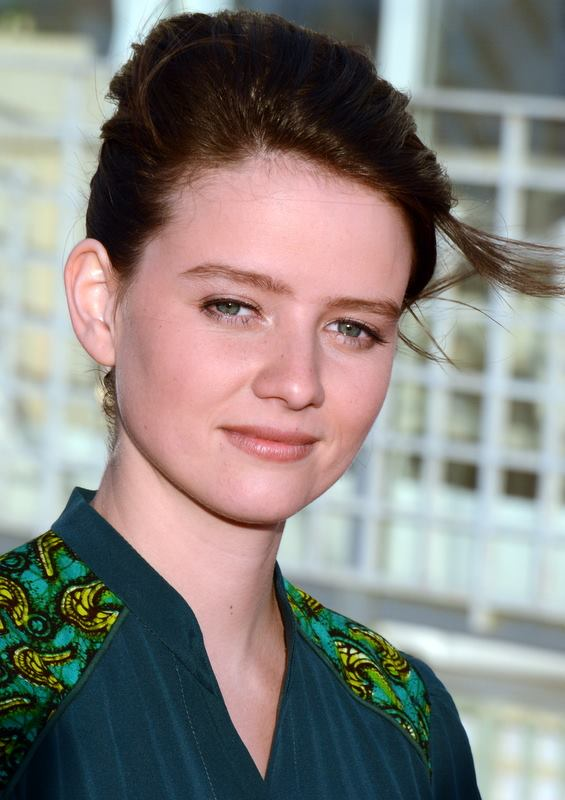
- Étienne in June 2014
- Born: 26 June 1989 (age 37); Ixelles, Brussels, Belgium
- Occupation: Actress
- Years active: 2008–present

Pauline Étienne (French pronunciation: [pɔlin etjɛn]; born 26 June 1989) is a Belgian actress who has received numerous awards for her acting. Her notable films include Le Bel Âge and Silent Voice, for which she won the Lumière Award for Most Promising Actress in 2010. She is known for her lead role in the 2013 film The Nun, directed by Guillaume Nicloux, for which she received two nominations at the 4th Magritte Awards, winning Best Actress and a nomination at the 39th César Awards.

== Life and career ==
Pauline Étienne grew up in Ixelles. She had an early interest in the theatre and music and joined a theatre workshop in her adolescence.

At age 18, she made her debut on the screen with a minor role in the Belgium film Élève libre (2008), directed by Joachim Lafosse. Pauline Étienne received the award for Most Promising Actress.

In 2009, her breakthrough came with Le Bel Âge in which she played opposite Michel Piccoli, and for which she won an actress prize at the Festival international des jeunes réalisateurs de Saint-Jean-de-Luz. Her work in Qu'un seul tienne et les autres suivront, directed by Léa Fehner, won her the Prix Lumière best actress newcomer award, then the Étoile d'or de la presse de la révélation féminine in 2010.

In 2013 she appeared in a new screen version of Denis Diderot's The Nun. She received two nominations for her outstanding performance for her role as the nun Suzanne, including winning the best actress award in the 4th Magritte Awards. In 2014 she had main roles for the films Eden and Tokio Fiancée for which she won Best Actress.

In 2016, she played a recurring role as Céline Delorme in the French political thriller television series The Bureau directed by Éric Rochant.

In 2018, Pauline appeared in her first English-language movie, Old Boys, in which she plays the main role of Agnes.

In 2020, she played the lead role in the Belgian apocalyptic sci-fi drama thriller streaming television series Into the Night.

== Filmography ==
=== Film ===
- 2008 : Private Lessons directed by Joachim Lafosse - Delphine
- 2009 : Le Bel Âge directed by Laurent Perreau - Claire
- 2009 : Silent Voice directed by Léa Fehner - Laure
- 2010 : Black Heaven directed by Gilles Marchand - Marion
- 2012 : Paradis perdu directed by Ève Deboise - Lucie
- 2013 : The Nun, directed by Guillaume Nicloux - Suzanne Simonin
- 2013 : 2 Autumns, 3 Winters directed by Sébastien Betbeder - Lucie
- 2014 : Eden directed by Mia Hansen-Løve - Louise
- 20xx: L'autre monde directed by Gilles Marchand
- 2014 : Tokio Fiancée directed by Stefan Liberski - Amélie
- 2017 : The Midwife directed by Martin Provost - Cécile Amado
- 2017 : Endangered Species directed by Gilles Bourdos - Anna
- 2018 : Old Boys directed by Toby MacDonald - Agnes

Short films

- 2010 : Where the Boys Are? directed by Bertrand Bonello - Pauline
- 2010 : Élena directed by Yannick Muller - Elena
- 2010 : Un certain dimanche directed by Tatiana Margaux Bonhomme - Jeanne
- 2011 : Comme des héros directed by Véronique Jadin - Rose
- 2011 : La France qui se lève tôt directed by Hugo Chesnard - Aurélie
- 2011 : Leçon de conduite directed by Élodie Lélue - Manon
- 2012 : Une place directed by Arnaud Aussibal

=== Television ===
- 2011 : Comment va la douleur ? directed by François Marthouret – Fiona
- 2011 : Une vie française directed by Jean-Pierre Sinapi – Marie Blick
- 2016 : The Bureau directed by Éric Rochant – Céline Delorme
- 2019 : Public Enemy directed by Matthieu Frances – Jessica
- 2020 : Into the Night directed by Inti Calfat – Sylvie Bridgette Dubois
- 2020 : 18h30 directed by Maxime Chamoux – Mélissa
- 2025 : The Sentinels – Marthe

== Awards and nominations ==
- 2009: Best actress at the International festival of young directors, Saint-Jean-de-Luz (Festival international des jeunes réalisateurs de Saint-Jean-de-Luz) for Le Bel Âge
- 2010: Lumière Award for Most Promising Actress for Qu'un seul tienne et les autres suivront.
- 2010: Gold star for Best actress newcomer /Étoile d'or de la révélation féminine for Qu'un seul tienne et les autres suivront.
- 2010: César nomination for best actress newcomer/César du meilleur espoir féminin for Qu'un seul tienne et les autres suivront
- 2011: Magritte Award, Most Promising Actress for Élève libre
- 2014: Magritte Award, Best Actress for The Nun
- 2015: Magritte nomination, Best Actress for Tokyo Fiancée
