= Perfectly Imperfect =

Perfectly Imperfect may refer to:

- Perfectly Imperfect (Sarah Geronimo album), 2014
- Perfectly Imperfect (Elle Varner album), 2012
- Perfectly Imperfect (EP), by Grace VanderWaal, 2016
- Perfectly Imperfect (platform), online newsletter and social media platform
- "Perfectly Imperfect", 2022 single by Mod Sun
- "Perfectly Imperfect", 2019 single by Jeremy Glinoga
- "Perfectly Imperfect", song from Pyramaze's Disciples of the Sun

== See also ==
- Perfect Imperfection (disambiguation)
- Perfectly Imperfect at the Ryman, live album by Margo Price
- "Perfectly Perfect", a song from Taking One for the Team by Simple Plan
