= Yakamoz S-245 =

2022 apocalyptic thriller TV series

- Genre: Apocalyptic; Science fiction; Drama; Thriller
- Based on: The Old Axolotl by Jacek Dukaj
- Developed by: Jason George
- Directed by: Tolga Karaçelik; Umut Aral
- Starring: Kıvanç Tatlıtuğ; Özge Özpirinçci; Ertan Saban; Ece Çeşmioğlu; Jerry Hoffmann; Ecem Uzun; Meriç Aral; Ersin Arıcı; Onur Ünsal; Güven Murat Akpınar; Hakan Salınmış; Alper Saldıran
- Country of origin: Turkey
- Original languages: Turkish; English
- No. of seasons: 1
- No. of episodes: 7

Production
- Executive producer: Jason George
- Producer: Diloy Gülün
- Cinematography: Burak Kanbir
- Camera setup: Single-camera
- Running time: 35–40 minutes
- Production company: OGM Pictures

Original release
- Network: Netflix
- Release: April 20, 2022

Related
- Into the Night

Yakamoz S-245 is a Turkish apocalyptic science fiction drama thriller television series created by Jason George, inspired by the 2015 Polish science fiction novel The Old Axolotl by Jacek Dukaj. The series premiered on Netflix on April 20, 2022, and is a spin-off of the Belgian series Into the Night.

== Plot summary ==
At the Incirlik Air Base in Turkey, a lieutenant called Hatice reports unusual solar waves. Then, we are introduced to Arman, a freespirited scuba diver and a submarine engineer. Arman reluctantly embarks on a submarine research trip near Incirlik. They become aware of a global catastrophe: the Sun has become lethal to humans without thick shielding such as deep water. They arrive at Kos where a military submarine, the Yakamoz S-245, has surfaced, and the two crews join forces. They search for survivors but none are found and some of the crew die. Before dawn breaks the surviving crew return to the submarine where tensions come to a head. Following an explosion the submarine is damaged and two, including Arman, go outside to fix it. The Yakamoz crew then discover an intruder: it is Hatice, who has stowed away to hide from the Sun. After further events they decide to head for a seed vault in Norway, tying the program into its sister series Into the Night.

== Reception ==
In the week of its opening, the series was reported to be the third most watched non-English TV series on Netflix.

== Production ==
Shooting took place in various locations in Turkey: İzmir, Balıkesir, Foça, and Ayvalık (especially Cunda Island) as well as on a Turkish Atılay class submarine.

== See also ==
- List of underwater science fiction works
- Turkish Naval Forces
