= East Wing (disambiguation) =

The East Wing refers to a part of the U.S. White House complex, demolished in 2025 ahead of the construction of a replacement.

East Wing may also refer to:

- Louvre Colonnade, the east façade of the Louvre in Paris, France
- East Wing (Kazakhstan), a Kazakh private airline
- "East Wing" (Veep), an episode of the television comedy series Veep

== See also ==
- West Wing, White House
