= The Old Axolotl =

2015 novel by Jacek Dukaj

- First edition (Polish)
- Author: Jacek Dukaj
- Original title: Starość aksolotla
- Language: Polish
- Genre: Science-fiction
- Publisher: Allegro
- Publication date: 2015
- Publication place: Poland
- Media type: digital-only novel
- Pages: 256
- ISBN: 9788308069394

The Old Axolotl (Polish: Starość aksolotla) is a 2015 digital-only novel by Polish science-fiction author Jacek Dukaj. The novel was released in Polish on March 10, 2015, and shortly afterward, on March 24 that year, in English (translated by Stanley Bill). It has been described as "an experiment in reading (and creating) the electronic literature of the future".

It is Dukaj's first novel to be published in English, though several of his short stories (The Golden Galley, 1996, The Iron General, 2010, The Apocrypha of Lem, 2011) have been translated prior to this.

The novel has inspired two Netflix original series: the 2020 Belgian Into the Night, and its 2022 Turkish language spin-off Yakamoz S-245.

== Plot ==
The novel presents a post-apocalyptic, cyberpunk vision of Earth where biological life has been wiped out, inhabited by robots and mechs, many of which are humans whose consciousness has been digitized in the wake of an extinction event.

== Significance and analysis ==
The novel is an example of electronic literature, available only in digital formats, and has no traditional paper version. It was designed from the beginning not only to incorporate more traditional elements such as illustrations, but also hypertext, and 3D-printable models of main robotic characters designed by Alex Jaeger, the art director of Transformers films. The novel composition is layered, with the narrative layer, an encyclopedic/hyperlinked footnote layer, and a multimedia layer, including illustrations and a short promotional video by the Oscar-nominated Platige Image studio.

One of the novel's central questions is: "What does it mean to be human?" Other subjects include post humanism and other "staples of cyberpunk and related genres, such as the artificial intelligence". The novel is representative of Dukaj's prose, posing philosophical questions about the future of man and technology. The author explained that: "stories such as The Old Axolotl that model an ‘escape from the body’ are born out of a sense of progress as a process of ‘de-animalising’ human beings through science. This has its origin in the pre-Enlightenment intuition of ‘liberation from nature’. For one of the last shackles of nature is corporeality itself, the limitations of our physicality." The other major element of the novel is Dukaj's attempts to introduce the reader to the new style of electronic literature.

The novel was nominated for the 2016 Janusz A. Zajdel Award.

== See also ==
- Axolotl
- Stanisław Lem
- Andrzej Sapkowski
- Janusz A. Zajdel
- Polish literature
