= The Happy Prince (2018 film) =

- Theatrical release poster
- Directed by: Rupert Everett
- Written by: Rupert Everett
- Produced by: Sébastien Delloye; Philipp Kreuzer; Jörg Schulze
- Starring: Rupert Everett; Colin Firth; Colin Morgan; Edwin Thomas; Emily Watson
- Cinematography: John Conroy
- Edited by: Nicolas Gaster
- Music by: Gabriel Yared
- Production companies: Beta Cinema; BBC Films; Lionsgate UK; Movie Management Corporation; Daryl Prince Productions; Casa Kafka Pictures; Belgian Tax Shelter; Belfius Zielke Strat Et Go International; Raindog Films; Maze Pictures; Entre Chien & Loup; Palomar; Cine Plus Filmproduktion; Tele München Group; Proximus Films; RTBF (Television Belge); Concorde Filmverleih; FFF Bayern; Deutscher Filmförderfonds; Eurimages; Wallimage; Wallonie-Bruxells Federation; Screen Brussels; Mibact Direzione Generale Cinema
- Distributed by: Concorde Filmverleih (Austria and Germany); September Film Distribution (Belgium and Netherlands); Vision Distribution (Italy); Lionsgate UK (United Kingdom and Ireland)
- Release dates: 21 January 2018 (Sundance); 12 April 2018 (Italy); 15 June 2018 (United Kingdom)
- Running time: 105 minutes
- Countries: Germany; Belgium; Italy; United Kingdom
- Languages: English, French, Italian
- Budget: $13 million
- Box office: $2.6 million

The Happy Prince is a 2018 biographical drama film about Oscar Wilde, written and directed by Rupert Everett in his directorial debut. The film stars Everett, Colin Firth, Colin Morgan, Emily Watson, Edwin Thomas and Tom Wilkinson. It premiered at the 2018 Sundance Film Festival, and was shown at the 2018 BFI Flare: London LGBT Film Festival. At the 9th Magritte Awards, it received a nomination in the category of Best Foreign Film.

The film's title alludes to the children's story by Oscar Wilde, The Happy Prince and Other Tales, which Wilde would read aloud to his children. The film was released in Italy on 12 April 2018, in the United Kingdom on 15 June 2018 and in the United States on 10 October 2018 to positive reviews from critics.

== Plot ==
1897. Oscar Wilde has just been released from prison after serving his sentence for gross indecency. Separated from his wife and children, he arrives in Dieppe, where old friends Reggie Turner and Robert Ross await him. Wilde assumes the alias of Sebastian Melmoth and tries to rebuild his life: he vainly writes to his wife Constance Lloyd to try to make peace with her. He is recognised by some young Englishmen, who taunt him and pursue him into a church; he defends himself violently, then receives severe warnings from the police.

Oscar then reunites with his old lover Lord Alfred (Bosie) Douglas, angering Robbie, whose secret love for him has never been reciprocated. Oscar and Bosie flee together to Naples, where they live for some time in a house in Posillipo, leading a libertine life. Soon Bosie's mother ceases to send her son his allowance – she is willing to resume payments and give a £200 payoff to Oscar if the two lovers separate. Despite Oscar's anger, they give in and separate. Shortly afterwards Constance, who had forbidden Oscar any contact with Bosie, dies from complications following surgery, and Oscar is denied any contact with their two children.

Now incapable of writing, Oscar takes refuge in Paris, where he lives off his wits and the charity of his old supporters. He meets Reggie and Robbie again and shortly thereafter he finds Bosie, who recently received a large inheritance on the death of his father; Bosie angrily refuses to help him. Meanwhile, the writer begins to show strange symptoms that he attributes to mussel poisoning, suspecting however that it may be syphilis. He meets two poor brothers with whom he shares misery: the elder becomes his favourite, while the younger wants to hear the fairy tale "The Happy Prince", which the writer always told his children.

Oscar's illness worsens and he receives a painful surgical operation to treat an abscess in his ear. His precarious physical state causes post-operative infections. With his last strength Oscar asks for an extreme Catholic unction, only to die surrounded by the few friends he has left. At the funeral Robbie complains to Bosie that he was a hypocrite, because he mourns the death of the man who had always loved him and whom he had abandoned without showing any gratitude. Bosie replies that these words are dictated by jealousy, and that only he will be remembered alongside Oscar Wilde, while Robbie will be forgotten.

The film's closing headlines state that Bosie died alone (which is not true) and penniless in 1945, while Robbie, who died in 1918, was buried in a part of Oscar's own grave reserved for him. Oscar was pardoned in 2017 together with other people convicted of homosexual offences.

== Cast ==
- Rupert Everett as Oscar Wilde
- Colin Firth as Reggie Turner
- Emily Watson as Constance Lloyd
- Colin Morgan as Lord Alfred "Bosie" Douglas
- Edwin Thomas as Robbie Ross
- Tom Wilkinson as Fr Dunne
- Anna Chancellor as Mrs Arbuthnot
- Béatrice Dalle as Café Manager
- Julian Wadham as Mr Arbuthnot
- John Standing as Dr Tucker
- André Penvern as Mr Dupoirier
- Tom Colley as Maurice Gilbert
- Stephen M. Gilbert as Paine
- Alister Cameron as Mr Howard
- Benjamin Voisin as Jean

== Production ==
Principal photography on the film began in mid-September 2016 in Bavaria, Germany. Filming was also done in France, Belgium and Italy. BBC Films and Lionsgate UK were some of the co-producers of the film, with the latter also handling UK distribution. Everett's third autobiographical book To the End of the World - Travels with Oscar Wilde (2020) consists in large part of reflections on the preparation and production of this film, recounting many difficulties which occurred. Due to budgetary problems, Firth agreed to forego his fee.

== Reception ==
On review aggregator Rotten Tomatoes, the film holds an approval rating of 72% based on 139 reviews, and an average rating of 6.5/10. The website's critical consensus reads, "A passion project for writer, director, and star Rupert Everett, The Happy Prince pays effective tribute to Oscar Wilde with a poignant look at his tragic final days." On Metacritic, the film has a weighted average score of 64 out of 100, based on 26 critics, indicating "generally favorable reviews".

A TV documentary of the story of Everett's long journey to obtain funding and support for the film from 2013 onwards, titled Born To Be Wilde, was directed and produced by Jack Cocker and broadcast on BBC One on 18 May 2018.

== Awards and nominations ==
Year	Award	Category	Recipient	Result	Ref.
2018	Bavarian Film Awards	Best Production	Jörg Schulze, Philipp Kreuzer	Won	
2018	Berlin International Film Festival	Best Feature Film	Rupert Everett	Nominated	
2018	British Independent Film Awards	Best Actor	Rupert Everett	Nominated	
2018	Camerimage	Best Directorial Debut	Rupert Everett	Nominated	
2018	European Film Awards	European Actor	Rupert Everett	Nominated	
2018	German Film Awards	Best Costume Design	Maurizio Millenotti, Giovanni Casalnuovo	Nominated	
2018	Premio Berenice	Best Costumes in Film	Maurizio Millenotti, Giovanni Casalnuovo	Won	
2018	Seville European Film Festival	Actor	Rupert Everett	Nominated	
2019	Dorian Awards	Unsung Film of the Year	The Happy Prince	Nominated	
2019	Magritte Awards	Best Foreign Film in Co-Production	Sébastien Delloye, Entre Chien et Loup	Nominated	
2019	Motion Picture Sound Editors Awards	Outstanding Achievement in Sound Editing	François Dumont, Jérémy Hassid, Antony Gray, Gervaise Demeure, Jeroen Truijens, Vincent Maloumian	Nominated	
2019	Satellite Awards	Best First Feature	Rupert Everett	Won	
2019	London Critics Circle Film Awards	British/Irish Actor of the Year	Rupert Everett	Won	
2019	London Critics Circle Film Awards	Film of the Year	The Happy Prince	Nominated	
2019	London Critics Circle Film Awards	Actor of the Year	Rupert Everett	Nominated	
2019	London Critics Circle Film Awards	British/Irish Film of the Year	The Happy Prince	Nominated	
2019	London Critics Circle Film Awards	Breakthrough British/Irish Filmmaker of the Year	Rupert Everett	Nominated	
