= Extensa =

2002 novel by Jacek Dukaj

- Polish edition cover
- Author: Jacek Dukaj
- Translator: not translated
- Cover artist: Tomasz Bagiński
- Language: Polish
- Genre: Science fiction novel
- Publisher: Wydawnictwo Literackie
- Publication date: 2002
- Publication place: Poland
- Media type: (Hardback & Paperback)
- Pages: 164 pp
- ISBN: 83-08-03286-9
- OCLC: 51216199
- LC Class: PG7163.U4 E96 2002

Extensa is a 2002 science fiction novel written by Jacek Dukaj, Polish science fiction writer. It is the second stand alone novels by Dukaj, and the first published by Wydawnictwo Literackie, marking the writer's growing recognition in Poland.

The novel protagonist is one of the few remaining, unaugmented human beings on Earth, and the novel's plot focuses on their life, as they consider whether to remain a traditional human being or embrace a transition to a transhumanist, singularitarian entity.

It was translated into Hungarian in 2012.

== Plot ==
The novel fits in the science fiction genre, describing a post-singularity society, where some humans have evolved further while others chose to remain behind. Like other works by Dukaj, the novel deals with highly advanced technology (like EPR paradox, related to the Einstein-Rosen-Podolsky bridge) and its implications for human society. The story depicts a world where there is a cultural conflict between those who support evolving into some posthuman form, and those who want to preserve "traditional" human form and culture. The main character, otherwise anonymous, who narrates his life, is born in the last enclave of traditional humans, the Green Country, and is constantly torn between his desire to experience the new world, and his fear of losing what makes him human.

== Analysis ==
The book's initial part is reminiscent of the magic realism genre, although later it moves into Dukaj's traditional science fiction.

Piotr Gorliński-Kucik noted that the work combines common tropes used by Dukaj in his other works, namely gnosticism and transhumanism. The book has a number of themes, such as the consequences of human evolution. Another of its themes is the concept of otherness. Related to it is the difficulty of first contact, particularly in the context where the sides have vastly different technological potential, reminiscent of Stanisław Lem's Fiasco. Dukaj himself described the main theme of the novel as cultural conflict.

The book also marked Dukaj's growing recognition by the literary mainstream in Poland, as it was his first book published by the mainstream publisher Wydawnictwo Literackie, while his earlier works were published by sci-fi-specialized publisher SuperNowa.

== Reception ==
It was nominated for Janusz A. Zajdel Award in 2002.

Krzysztof Uniłowski noted that the reception for the book was mixed. As Dukaj's mainstream debut, some mainstream reviewers were snobbish, criticizing the book's sci-fi theme; conversely, for some members of Polish science fiction fandom, Dukaj's change of publishers seemed like a betrayal of his roots.

Marek Oramus reviewed Extensa for Nowa Fantastyka in 2002. Oramus praised Extensa for a number of reasons: it is a solid science fiction novel, discussing a number of scientific concepts; it is well structured - beginning with a story of a child growing up, and exploding into a story dealing with the entire Universe; the action is dramatic enough; and the themes have significant moral and philosophical dimensions as well.

In the same year, Wojciech Orliński reviewed the book for Gazeta Wyborcza. Orliński called Dukaj the best Polish writer of hard science fiction, while noting that the work is more "tame" and less science-fiction-like than most of his previous works. As such, Orliński described the work as being in a good gateway position for mainstream readers who have so far avoided the science fiction genre, as the work can be described as a tale told by a child, with supernatural elements taking a second seat to the book's focus on "a story of a farmer's family".

The book was well received by several reviewers at the Polish Poltergeist portal. Katarzyna Sałak gave it a 10/10 score in 2007, Bartosz Krawczyk, 8/10 in 2010 and Tomasz Czajka, 9/10, also in 2010. Also in 2010 (the year a second edition was published), Maria Kobielska reviewed it positively for Polish magazine e-splot, focusing on the narrative style and character development. That year in Esensja, Grzegorz Rogaczewski discussed the book in his overview of Dukaj's works published. He noted that the book is somewhat less "baroque" and complex than some of Dukaj's earlier works, and the theme of contact between more or less advanced civilization is reminiscent of Strugatsky's Roadside Picnic. Beatrycze Nowicka reviewed the book for Esensja in 2017. She concluded that the novel still holds up well despite 15 years since it debuted. She praises the book for interesting discussion of various scientific concepts, as well as world building, although she criticized the main character as "irritatingly passive".
