= Ecem Uzun =

Turkish actress

- Born: Ecem Uzun; June 17, 1992 (age 33); Istanbul, Turkey
- Citizenship: Turkish
- Education: Kadir Has University
- Occupation: Actress

Ecem Uzun (born June 17, 1992, Istanbul) is a Turkish television, cinema, and theater actress. She is best known for award festival films and Küçük Sırlar (an adaptation of Gossip Girl) and comedy series Jet Sosyete. She took her first step into acting with an Ülker commercial as child actor. She is a graduate of Kadir Has University, Department of Theater.

== Early life and education ==
Born on June 17, 1992, in the Sarıyer district of Istanbul to a family from Rize, Uzun began her theater education as a trainee at the Sarıyer Municipal Theater at the age of eight. During this time, she also participated in the theater's productions. She completed her primary education at Sarıyer Elementary School and graduated from Hüseyin Kalkavan High School. Uzun then enrolled in the Theater Department of Kadir Has University.

== Career ==
Uzun initiated her acting career with an Ülker commercial. She gained prominence with significant roles in television series such as Aliye, Geniş Zamanlar, Pulsar, Gönül Salıncağı, and Ah Kalbim.

She played as Meriç/Jenny in Küçük Sırlar, which is an adaptation of Gossip Girl. She portrayed the character Alara Çıkrıkçıoğlu in the comedy series Jet Sosyete.

In 2016, she starred in Reha Erdem's film Big Big World (Koca Dünya) and Yeşim Ustaoğlu's film Clair Obscur (Tereddüt). Uzun took part in the theater play War (Savaş) alongside Tilbe Saran, Sermet Yeşil, Damla Sönmez, and Onur Gürçay, earning acclaim for her performance. Her role in Yeşim Ustaoğlu's Clair Obscur in 2016 marked her as a leading actress. The same year, she played a leading role in Reha Erdem's award-winning film Big Big World. Through these performances, Uzun demonstrated her talent at a young age.

== Filmography ==
=== Web Series ===
Year	Project
2022	Yakamoz S-245
2021	Fatma
2021	Şeref Bey
2018-2020	Jet Sosyete

=== Films ===
Year	Project
2022	Together, Alone
2021	Seni Buldum Ya
2017	Buğday
2016	Koca Dünya

=== TV Series ===
Year	Project
2016	Aşk Yalanı Sever
2010	Küçük Sırlar
2009	Ah Kalbim
2008	Pulsar
2007	Geniş Zamanlar
2007	Gönül Salıncağı
2004	Aliye

== Awards ==
Year	Award	Category
2014	18.Afife Theatre Awards	The Most Successful Young Generation Artist of the Year
2014	XIV. Direklerarası Seyirci Ödülleri	Young Talent Award
2016	53rd International Antalya Golden Orange Film Festival	Best Actress (International)
2016	53rd International Antalya Golden Orange Film Festival	Best Actress (National)
2017	36th International Istanbul Film Festival	Best Actress
