= Ice (Dukaj novel) =

2007 novel by Jacek Dukaj

- Polish edition cover.
- Author: Jacek Dukaj
- Original title: Lód
- Translator: Ursula Phillips
- Cover artist: Tomasz Bagiński
- Language: Polish
- Genre: science fiction/alternate history
- Publisher: Wydawnictwo Literackie
- Publication date: 2007
- Publication place: Poland
- Pages: 1054

Ice (Polish: Lód) is a 2007 Polish novel by the Polish science fiction writer Jacek Dukaj, published in Poland by Wydawnictwo Literackie. The novel mixes alternate history with science fiction elements, in particular, with alternative physics and logic. It won the Janusz A. Zajdel Award, European Union Prize for Literature and Kościelski Award. Ice was shortlisted for the 2026 EBRD Literature Prize.

== Translations ==
English language rights to Ice were acquired by London-based publisher Head of Zeus in 2017. The translation by Ursula Phillips was published on 6 November 2025.

In 2017 the novel was translated to Russian and Bulgarian; in 2018 the novel was translated to Ukrainian. The Czech translation of the novel was released in 2021 and won the translation category of Magnesia Litera award the following year.

== Story ==
=== Setting ===
The story of the book takes place in an alternate universe where the First World War never occurred and Poland is still under Russian rule. Following the Tunguska event, the Ice, a mysterious form of matter, has covered parts of Siberia in the Russian Empire and started expanding outwards, reaching Warsaw. The appearance of Ice results in extreme decrease of temperature, putting the whole continent under constant winter, and is accompanied by Lute, angels of Frost, a strange form of being which seems to be a native inhabitant of Ice. Under the influence of the Ice, iron turns into zimnazo (cold iron), a material with extraordinary physical properties, which results in the creation of a new branch of industry, zimnazo mining and processing, giving birth to large fortunes and new industrial empires. Moreover, the Ice freezes history and philosophy, preserving the old political regime, affecting human psychology and changing the laws of logic from many-valued logic of "Summer" to two-valued logic of "Winter" with no intermediate steps between true and false.

Dukaj noted that in this book, science in science-fiction stands for the philosophy of history. The book's graphic design is by Polish illustrator and producer Tomasz Bagiński.

=== Plot ===
The protagonist of the novel is Benedykt Gierosławski, a Polish mathematician and notorious gambler, collaborating with Alfred Tarski on his work on many-valued logics. The Ministry of Winter's officials visit Gierosławski and make him embark on a Transsiberian journey to find his lost father, who is said to be able to communicate with Lute.

During his journey Gieroslawski finds out that he is caught in a political intrigue, brought about by rivalry between two palace factions, liedniacy (conservatives and Siberian entrepreneurs backing the idea of "frozen Russia") and ottiepelnicy (mostly revolutionaries aiming for a literal and political "thaw"), supported also by the Tsar.

Gieroslawski meets Nikola Tesla in disguise, who has conceived a technology for manipulating and eventually destroying the Ice and has been hired by the Tsar to relieve Russia from the Winter. During the journey and upon his arrival in Irkutsk Gierosławski discovers that various political forces, including Followers of St. Marcyn, a sect worshiping the Ice led by Rasputin, followers of Nikolai Fyodorovich Fyodorov, who strive for assuring human immortality, and Siberian industrial potentates, are interested in his person and that Józef Piłsudski, in this reality leading a group of Sybiraks and Siberian separatists fighting for Polish independence, may possess knowledge about his father.

== Critical reception ==
Lód was planned as a short story for Król Bólu anthology, but grew into an epic-length novel. The book, of over 1,000 pages, was published in early December 2007 (samples were released in the October issue of Nowa Fantastyka). It had been long-awaited by fans, as Dukaj's previous book – Perfect Imperfection – was published in 2004. On the book's launch, Dukaj was interviewed by Polish radio stations Radio Kraków and by TOK FM. In December 2007, the book received the honorary prize at the Poznań Review of New Publications and was named "Book of Autumn 2007" organized by Raczyński Library in Poznań.

In his review Wojciech Orliński writes that unlike many previous books by Dukaj, this has excellent action, and names it a "sensational novel par excellence", and compares it to books by Robert Ludlum (albeit in the science-fiction, alternate history genre).

The novel was a finalist for the 2026 Locus Award for Best Translated Novel.

== Analysis ==
The work has been classified as "white steampunk", a subgenre of Polish science fiction using steampunk aesthetics and set in Imperial Russia.
