= Clair Obscur (2016 film) =

2016 Turkish drama film

- Directed by: Yeşim Ustaoğlu
- Written by: Yeşim Ustaoğlu
- Produced by: Titus Kreyenberg; Yeşim Ustaoğlu; Marianne Slot; Klaudia Śmieja-Rostworowska; Eliza Oczkowska
- Starring: Funda Eryiğit; Ecem Uzun; Mehmet Kurtuluş; Okan Yalabık
- Cinematography: Michael Hammon
- Edited by: Agnieszka Glińska; Svetolik Mica Zajc
- Music by: Antoni Komasa-Lazarkiewicz
- Production companies: Unafilm; Ustaoglu Film; Slot Machine; in association with Aeroplan Film
- Release date: 11 September 2016 (Toronto International Film Festival)
- Countries: Turkey; Germany; Poland; France
- Language: Turkish

Clair Obscur (Turkish: Tereddüt) is a 2016 Turkish drama film directed by Yeşim Ustaoğlu.

== Synopsis ==
Chehnaz, an attractive, modern woman and her husband Cem live in a hip neighbourhood in Istanbul. Chehnaz has been assigned to a public hospital in a small, remote seaside town to complete her mandatory 2-year duty as an aspiring psychiatrist. While treating her patients during the week, she's mostly looking forward to the weekend and their Istanbul lives. However, during this routine, Chehnaz' sexual problem with her husband becomes more evident - a problem that she is not able to face. After a stormy night the course of Chehnaz's life is changed forever when she meets Elmas, a young woman from the town, who was married-off to a distant relative. Elmas survives as best she can far away from her family in a hostile environment with an older man she doesn't love.

== Reception ==
The Film Stage gave the film "A−", while CineVue gave it 4/5. The Hollywood Reporter praised the film, saying "Stunning newcomer Ecem Uzun electrifies an intimate women's drama." Similarly, Screen Daily wrote "Ecem Uzun is unnervingly convincing as a girl left traumatised by her marriage, catatonic in her silences and raging like a trapped animal in panic and terror at what fresh ordeal might lie ahead". Exclaim! rated it 7/10.

=== Accolades ===
The film won several awards including best picture at the 53rd Antalya International Film Festival.

At the 2016 Haifa International Film Festival, Clair Obscur received a special mention in the Mediterranean Golden Anchor Competition.
