= Big Big World (film) =

2016 film

- Directed by: Reha Erdem
- Written by: Reha Erdem
- Starring: Berke Karaer
- Release date: 8 September 2016 (Venice)
- Running time: 101 minutes
- Country: Turkey
- Language: Turkish

Big Big World (Turkish: Koca Dünya) is a 2016 Turkish drama film directed by Reha Erdem. It was screened in the Horizions section at the 73rd Venice International Film Festival.

== Cast ==
- Berke Karaer as Ali
- Ecem Uzun as Zuhal
- Melisa Akman as Falci
- Murat Deniz as Tamirci
- Ayta Sözeri as Hayat Kadını
