= Wroniec (book) =

2009 novel by Jacek Dukaj

- Polish edition cover
- Author: Jacek Dukaj
- Original title: Wroniec
- Translator: not translated
- Cover artist: Jakub Jabłoński
- Language: Polish
- Genre: fantasy
- Published: 2009 (Wydawnictwo Literackie)
- Publication place: Poland
- Pages: 247
- ISBN: 978-83-08-04392-9
- OCLC: 2010418547

Wroniec (meaning Crowman) is a fantasy novel published in 2009 by the Polish science fiction writer Jacek Dukaj, published in Poland by Wydawnictwo Literackie. The novel is extensively illustrated by Jakub Jabłoński. It was nominated for the prime Polish award for science-fiction literature, the Janusz A. Zajdel Award, as well as the Angelus award, in 2009. It also received the Autumn 2009 prize of the Poznański Przegląd Nowości Wydawniczych (Poznań Review of New Publications).

The book is presented in the form of a fairy tale for children and tells the story of a fantasy-like adventure of a young boy during the martial law in Poland of December 1981. Due to its layered nature, it contains numerous serious references to the events surrounding the controversial martial law in question and is targeted more at adults than at children.

Dukaj has described the book as the "dark, national phantasmagoria in the form of a children's fairy tale"; Crow-Soldiers throw those caught without a pass into boiling cauldrons, Milipants (misspelled militiamen) beat with the intention to kill, and crows go for the eyes. There are numerous references to language and cultural aspects of the bygone Polish People's Republic. Dukaj mixes the vocabulary of a little boy with the Polish Communist Party's newspeak. He creates new words, and the book is full of songs and poems created through that mix. There are inspirations and references to the Grimm Brothers, Lewis Carroll (whose quote opens the book), Cormac McCarthy, Edgar Allan Poe, Stefan Żeromski and Tadeusz Konwicki.

== Plot ==
The book tells a fantasy-like story of a young boy during the martial law in Poland of December 1981. Adaś, a little boy, falls ill around the time that martial law is declared. After he wakes, he witnesses the kidnapping of most of his family and the wounding of his mother by the eponymous Wroniec ("Crowman", a pun on the nickname of WRON and General Wojciech Jaruzelski, who orchestrated the martial law). Together with an old worker, Jan Beton, Adaś sets out to look for his family. Outside his house, the town is gray, as the Graying Machine tries to sap energy from everyone. He will have to face many opponents, such as the Milipants, the Double Agents, the Queue and other monsters. He will be aided by the opposition, led by the Most Stubborn Electrician (an allusion to Lech Wałęsa).

== Reception ==
The book garnered mostly positive reviews, including those in the mainstream Polish press (Gazeta Wyborcza, Polityka, Tygodnik Powszechny, Dziennik Polski). Dissenting reviews were few. Notably, Monika Małkowska in Rzeczpospolita has described the book as confusing and naive, but her review itself has been criticized in turn by Maciej Parowski.

The art of Jakub Jabłoński, who designed the cover and numerous illustrations within the book, has also been praised. The artistic style of Wroniec has been compared to the cartoons of Tim Burton.

The structure of the book, particularly addressing the martial law through a children's book format, has caused some controversy in Poland, although mostly positive. While reviewers often stated that the book "should be controversial", they praised Dukaj for this innovative approach and breaking the unspoken taboo with regards to writing about this part of modern Polish history. As one of the reviewers noted: "nobody has told such a story about the December of 1981 till now." Sparking such a discussion about the martial law and reclaiming the subject for cultural discussions was one of Dukaj's goals.

The publication of the book was supported by the Institute of National Remembrance and the National Center for Culture (Narodowe Centrum Kultury), and it was part of the commemoration of the martial law anniversary. As part of that initiative, the Polish singer Kazik Staszewski wrote music for two of several songs contained within the book. Wroniec has also been adapted for the theatre. In 2009 the novel was nominated for the prime Polish award for science-fiction literature, the Janusz A. Zajdel Award, as well as the Angelus award. It also received the Autumn 2009 prize of the Poznański Przegląd Nowości Wydawniczych (Poznań Review of New Publications).
