= Edwin Thomas (actor) =

British actor

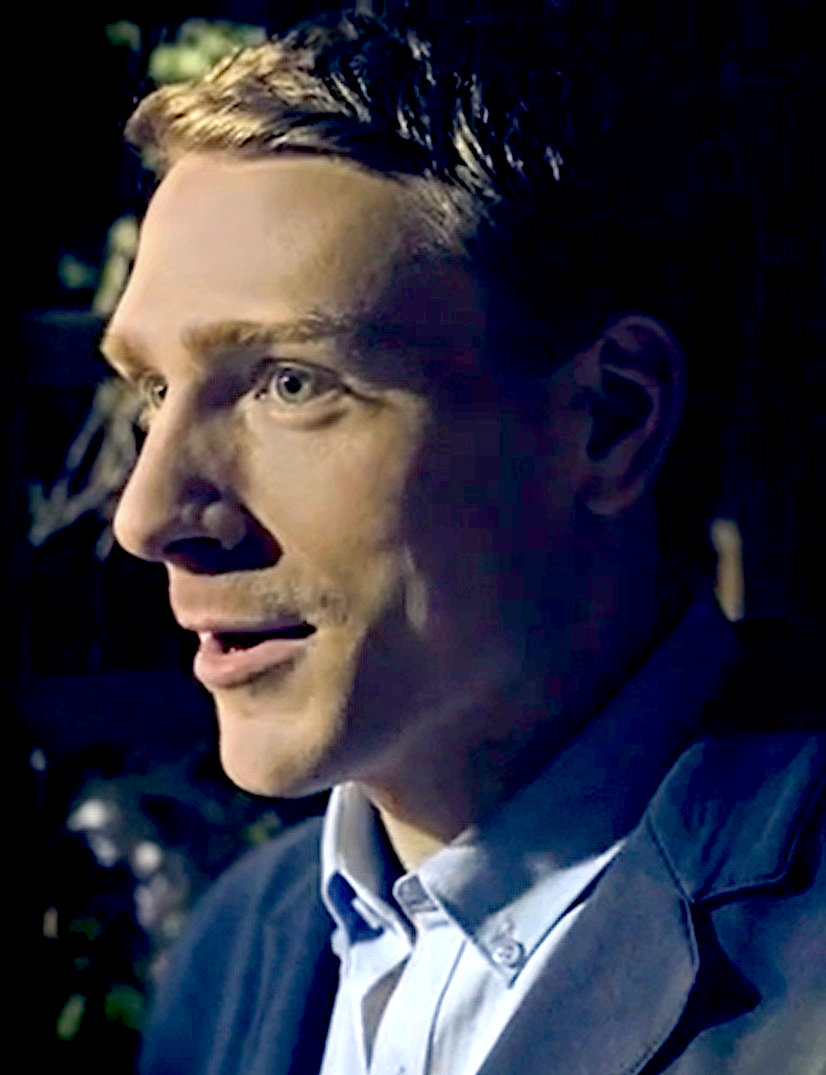
Edwin Thomas in 2013

Edwin Leo Thomas is a British actor who works in theatre, TV and film. He is best known for his portrayal of Robbie Ross, alongside Rupert Everett, Colin Firth and Emily Watson in The Happy Prince.

Thomas has a largely invisible form of cerebral palsy, a spectrum of conditions which result from birth trauma and have developmental consequences.

== Early life ==
Thomas studied French and Portuguese at Wadham College, Oxford, before studying acting at the Guildhall School of Music and Drama, where he was awarded the Laurence Olivier Bursary Main Prize, the Mary Selway Bursary and the Michael Bryant Award.

== Acting career ==
Thomas worked as an actor for one year after graduating from Guildhall, appearing on screen in BBC's 'Restless' (2012), ITV's Inspector Lewis (2013), and starring as Irwin in the Crucible Theatre's production of Alan Bennett's The History Boys (2013) alongside Matthew Kelly, directed by Michael Longhurst.

In 2013, Thomas was forced to stop acting due to ill health. He suffered complications from his disability, ad spent 4 years rehabilitating his injuries with The Feldenkrais Method.

During this time he worked in education, teaching English and French and working as a careers advisor and 6th form mentor at St Mary Magdalene Academy. He also co-developed an outreach programme for the Guildhall School, running acting workshops across schools in London.

Returning to acting in 2018, Thomas starred in The Happy Prince, written, directed by and starring Rupert Everett. Thomas plays Oscar Wilde's friend and lover Robbie Ross, alongside Colin Firth, Colin Morgan, Emily Watson, Anna Chancellor and Tom Wilkinson. The Happy Prince had its world premiere at the 2018 Sundance Film Festival, and European premiere at Berlinale Film Festival (February 2018) and was released in the UK on 15 June 2018.

Guy Lodge said of Thomas in Variety: "Ross’s weary, take-and-take relationship with his client, friend and sometime lover gives the film its most quietly moving thread, buoyed by Thomas’s stoic, softly sorrowful performance." For his work, Thomas was selected as a Screen International Star of Tomorrow.

He has since appeared in Victoria (ITV), Invasion (Apple TV) and Into The Night (Netflix) and The Laureate (2022).

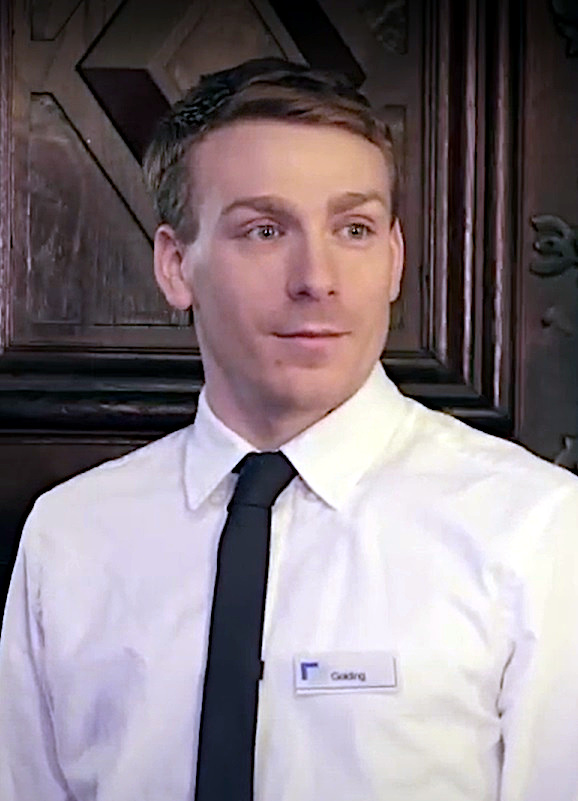
Edwin Thomas in the play Eastward Ho! 2013

== Disability ==
Thomas has cerebral palsy. Injuries sustained as a result of his condition prevented him from acting for much of his twenties, but he subsequently returned to running, swimming, tennis, football and acting, having recovered from his injuries using The Feldenkrais Method. Thomas is an advocate for invisible disability and helps spread awareness of disability in both education and the entertainment industry.

== Awards ==
- Screen International Star of Tomorrow - Thomas was one of eight actors named 2018's Star of Tomorrow

=== Film ===
Year	Title	Role	Ref
2018	The Happy Prince	Robbie Ross	

=== Television ===
Year	Title	Role	Notes	Ref
	Restless	Edward	Television film	
	Inspector Lewis	Reuben Beatty	Episode: "Down Among the Fearful: Part 1"	
	Churchill: 100 Days That Saved Britain	John Colville	Television film	
	Midsomer Murders	Finn Thornberry	Episode: "The Village That Rose from the Dead"	
	Endeavour	Noel Porter	Episode: "Passenger"	
	Victoria	Mr Caine	Episode: "A Show of Unity"	
	Into the Night	Roger	Episode: "Jakub" and "Sylvie"	
