= Jacek Dukaj =

Polish writer (born 1974)

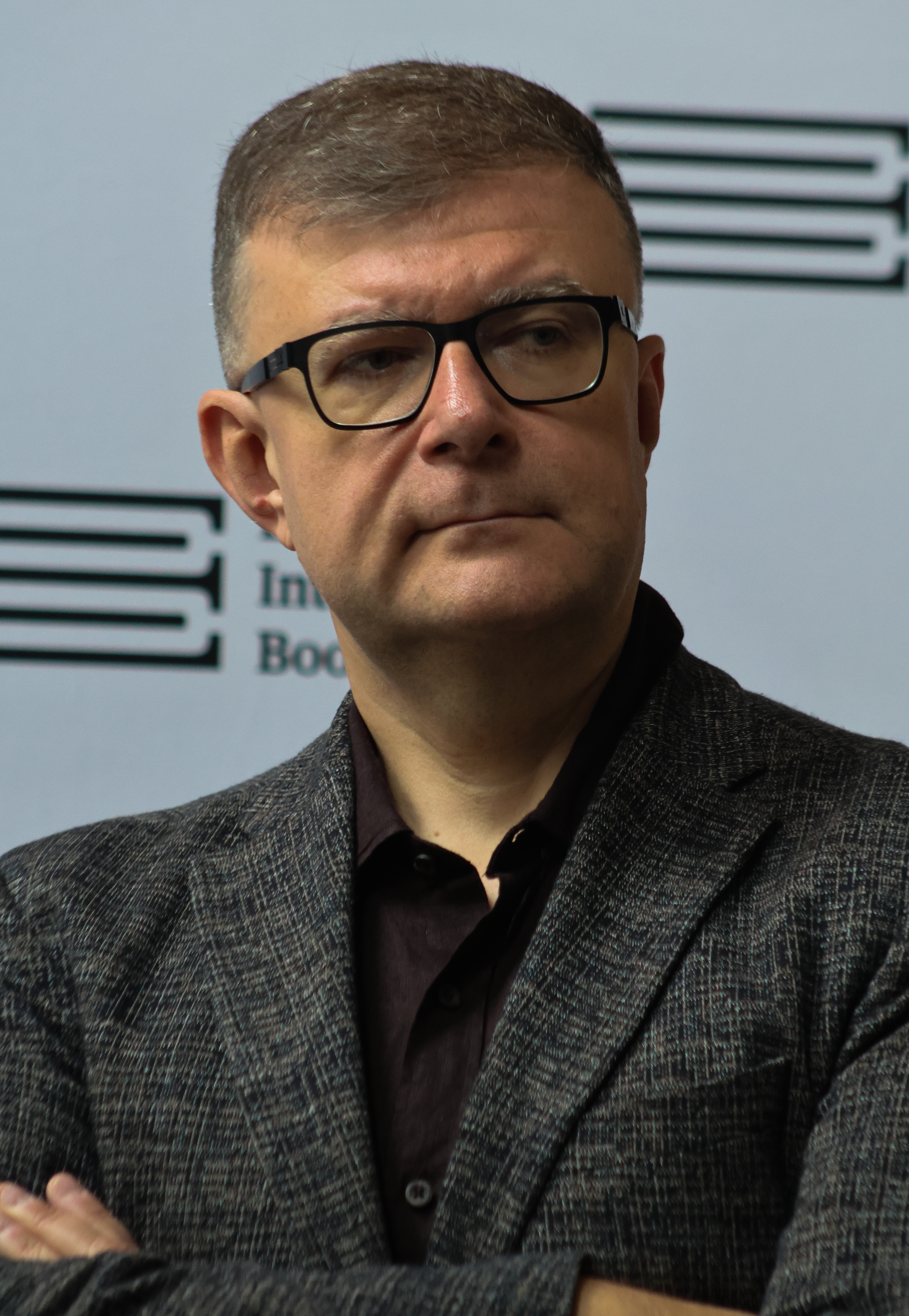
- Dukaj at Edinburgh Book Fest 2026
- Born: 30 July 1974 (age 52); Tarnów, Poland
- Education: Jagiellonian University
- Occupation: writer
- Writing career
- Language: Polish
- Genre: Science fiction
- Notable works: Katedra, Czarne oceany, The Old Axolotl, Perfekcyjna niedoskonałość, Lód
- Notable awards: European Union Prize for Literature (2009); Medal for Merit to Culture – Gloria Artis (2017); European Science Fiction Award (2023)

Jacek Józef Dukaj (pronounced: [ˈjat͡sɛk ˈdukaj]; born 30 July 1974) is a Polish science fiction and fantasy writer. His fiction explores such themes as alternate history, alternative physics and logic, human nature, religion, the relationship between science and power, technological singularity, artificial intelligence, and transhumanism. He is regarded among the most popular Polish contemporary science fiction authors.

He is the recipient of numerous national and international literary prizes including the European Union Prize for Literature, Janusz A. Zajdel Award and European Science Fiction Award.

== Career ==
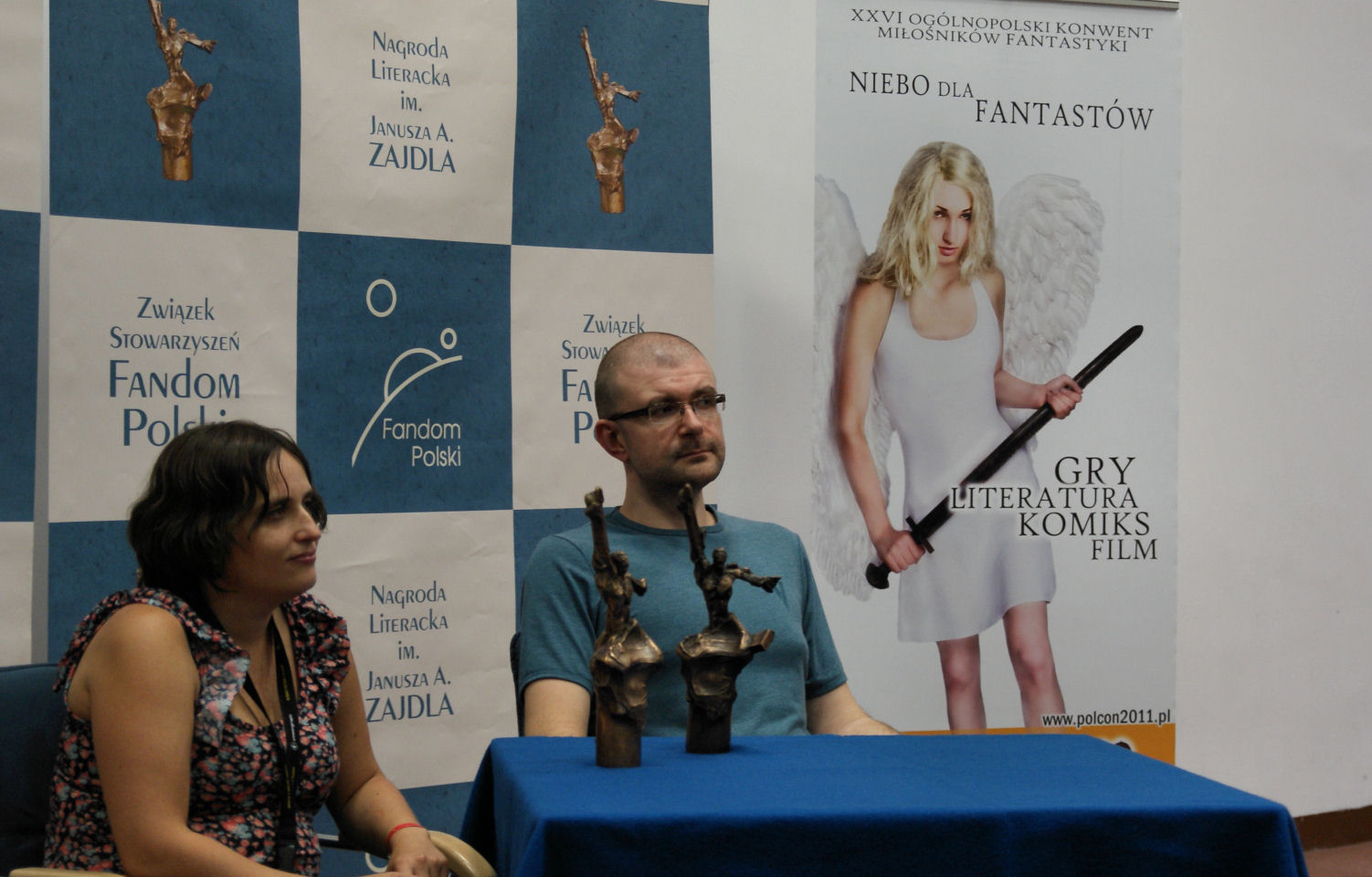
Jacek Dukaj (right) and Anna Kańtoch (left) - laureates of the 2010 Janusz A. Zajdel Awards

He was born on 30 July 1974 in Tarnów. He graduated from High School No. 3 in Tarnów and subsequently studied philosophy at the Jagiellonian University in Kraków. He made his literary debut at the age of 16 when he published his short story "Złota Galera" ("The Golden Galley") in the Fantastyka science-fiction monthly. In 1997, he published his first novel Xavras Wyżryn. His texts and short stories were featured in such science fiction and fantasy magazines as Nowa Fantastyka, SFinks, Framzeta, Fenix, Science Fiction and Czas Fantastyki.

His short stories have been translated into English, German, Russian, Czech, Slovak, Macedonian, Italian, Bulgarian, Hungarian, Ukrainian and Bosnian. His first story, "The Golden Galley", was translated into English by Wiesiek Powaga and published in The Dedalus Book of Polish Fantasy (1996). Michael Kandel's translation of "The Iron General" has been published in A Polish Book of Monsters (2010) and his translation of fragments of "The Cathedral" into English is available online. The Cathedral served as the basis for the 2002 Academy Award-nominated science-fiction short film of the same name directed by Tomasz Bagiński.

In 2007, he published one of the most successful of his novels entitled Ice for which he won the Janusz A. Zajdel Award, European Union Prize for Literature and Kościelski Award. In 2009, he published Wroniec whose action takes place in the background of the 1981 martial law in Poland.

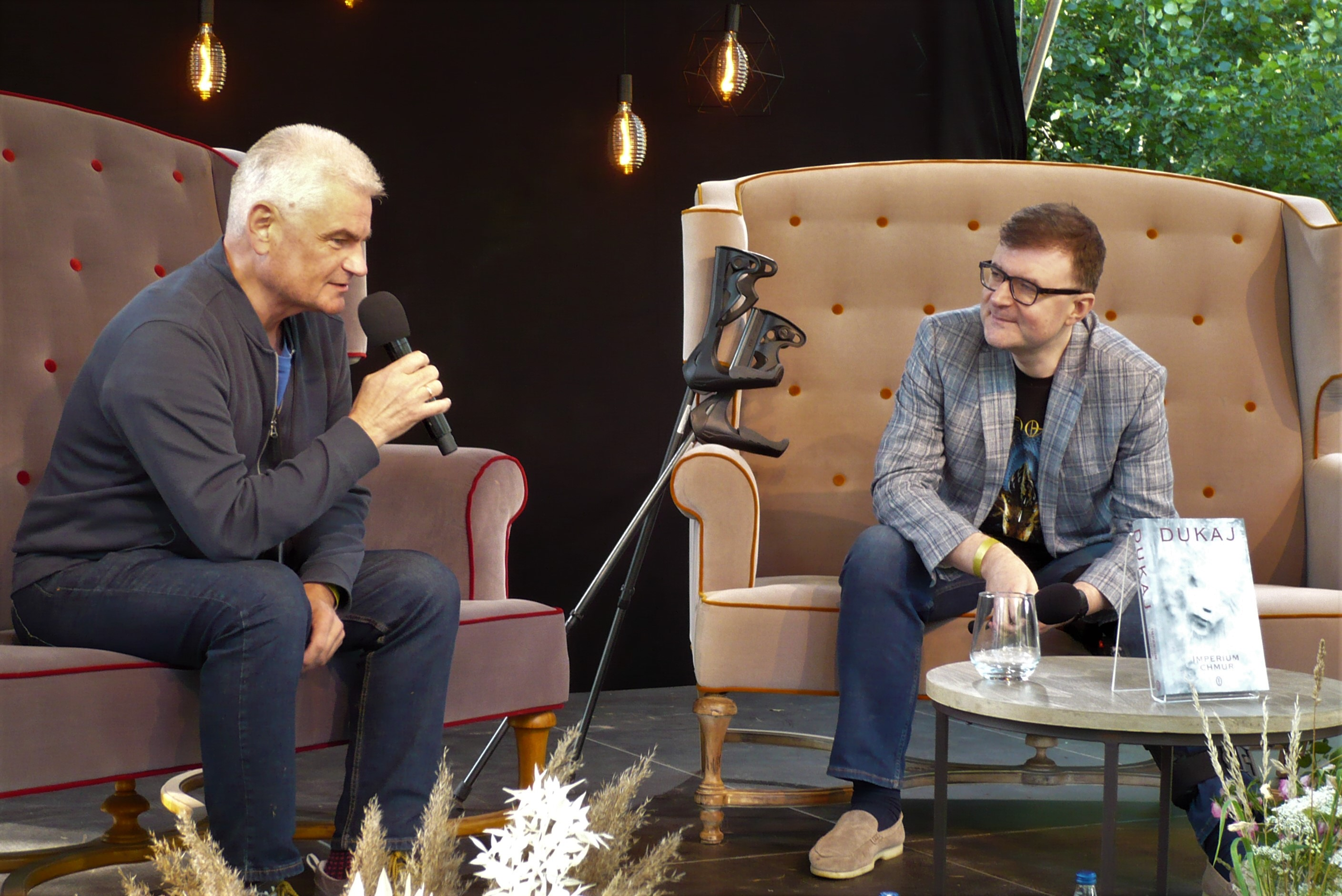
Dukaj (right) at the Literary Heights Festival, 2022

The Apocrypha of Lem, a mock-review in Lem's tradition, written as an afterword for reedition of Lem's A Perfect Vacuum, was published in "Lemistry", translated by Danuta Stok.

The Old Axolotl (2015) is the first book of Dukaj to be published in English. It was only published digitally, and uses devices that are typical in electronic literature such as hypertextual links and multimedia components. The Old Axolotl tells the story of a neutron wave that destroys all life, although some humans have managed to upload themselves to robots and other devices. The novel inspired a 2020 Netflix-original Belgian TV series Into the Night. In 2017, English language rights to Ice were acquired by London-based publisher Head of Zeus. Publication is due on 6 November 2025.

As of 2021, Jacek Dukaj is also involved in business, being main shareholder and CEO of Nolensum company, founded to produce video games based on his stories and original ideas, as well as shareholder and member of Board of Directors of Bellwether Rocks, an investment fund with focus on gamedev industry and new technologies like tokenization, NFTs, crypto and similar.

In 2023, he was awarded the European Science Fiction Award conferred by the European Science Fiction Society (ESFS) in the Best Author category.

== Style and themes ==
His works frequently feature elements of cyberpunk, alternative history, and horror stories. He was an early representative of klerykal fiction, a subgenre of Polish fantasy and science fiction characterized by the use of religious themes, which remains one of the most distinctive features of Dukaj's novels. They were already present in The Golden Galley, his literary debut. The author is also known for undertaking literary experiments manifesting themselves in the combination of elements of fantasy with science fiction as is the case with The Iron General (2015).

Dukaj has stated that creating a cohesive vision of the universe in a particular work is the basis of any good fantasy or science fiction book. Hence his books scrupulously describe the scientific aspects governing this universe and make use of elaborate scientific terminology. The realism in presenting the boundaries of human understanding might be inspired by the works of Stanisław Lem, which introduce the theme of the wear and tear of future inventions. The secret relationship between science and power is also explored in Dukaj's works, most notably in Black Oceans (2001), which is reminiscent of Lem's His Master's Voice (1968).

== Bibliography ==
=== Novels ===
- Xavras Wyżryn (SuperNOWA, 1997, contains two short novels - Xavras Wyżryn and Zanim noc)
- Czarne oceany (Black Oceans) (SuperNOWA, 2001)
- Extensa (Extensa) (Wydawnictwo Literackie, 2002)
- Inne pieśni (translated as Different Chants or Other Songs) (Wydawnictwo Literackie, 2003)
- Perfekcyjna niedoskonałość (An Ideal Imperfection) (Wydawnictwo Literackie, 2004)
- Ice (Lód) (Wydawnictwo Literackie, 2007)
- Wroniec (The Crow) (Wydawnictwo Literackie, 2009)
- Starość aksolotla (The Old Axolotl) (Allegro, 2015)
- Imperium chmur (Empire of Clouds) (SQN, 2018, titled Other Worlds; WL, 2020, extended version); a 2019 winner of the Jerzy Żuławski Literary Award

== Awards and nominations ==
- Śląkfa, Author of the Year: 2000, 2007, 2009
- Nautilus Award: 2003, 2004, 2007
- Angelus Award nomination: 2007
- Nike Award nomination: 2007
- Kościelski Award: 2008, novel Ice
- European Union Prize for Literature: 2009, novel Ice
- Paszport Polityki nomination: 2004, 2008, 2009
- Jerzy Żuławski Prize: 2008, 2010, 2011, 2012, 2019
- Janusz A. Zajdel Award: 2000, 2001, 2003, 2004, 2007, 2010
- Bronze Medal for Merit to Culture – Gloria Artis from the Ministry of Culture and National Heritage of the Republic of Poland: 11 December 2013
- European Science Fiction Award, 2023

== Sources ==
- Jacek Dukaj's Official Website in Polish
- Jacek Dukaj's Official Website in English
- Jacek Dukaj's company's website
