= Into the Night (TV series) =

2020 apocalyptic thriller TV series

- Promotional release poster
- Genre: Apocalyptic; Science fiction; Drama; Thriller
- Based on: The Old Axolotl by Jacek Dukaj
- Developed by: Jason George
- Starring: Jan Bijvoet; Nabil Mallat; Pauline Etienne; Laurent Capelluto; Stefano Cassetti; Astrid Whettnall; Vincent Londez; Regina Bikkinina; Alba Gaïa Bellugi; Babetida Sadjo; Mehmet Kurtuluş; Ksawery Szlenkier
- Composer: Photek
- Country of origin: Belgium
- Original languages: French; Polish; Turkish; Italian; Russian; English; Dutch; Arabic; Spanish
- No. of seasons: 2
- No. of episodes: 12

Production
- Executive producers: Jason George; Jacek Dukaj; Tomasz Bagiński; D.J. Talbot
- Camera setup: Single-camera
- Running time: 35–40 minutes
- Production company: Entre Chien et Loup

Original release
- Network: Netflix
- Release: May 1, 2020 – September 8, 2021

Related
- Yakamoz S-245 (spin-off series)

Into the Night is a Belgian apocalyptic science fiction drama thriller television series created by Jason George, inspired by the 2015 Polish science fiction novel The Old Axolotl by Jacek Dukaj. The series premiered on Netflix on May 1, 2020. It is Netflix's first Belgian original series. On July 1, 2020, the series was renewed by Netflix for a second season. The second season premiered on September 8, 2021, while a Turkish language submarine-set spin-off, Yakamoz S-245, was released on April 20, 2022.

== Premise ==
The first season follows a group of people whose passenger airliner is hijacked while they are on board a red-eye flight from Brussels. Terenzio, the hijacker, is an Italian NATO soldier who forces his way onto the aircraft and demands an early take-off. The handful of people in the aircraft then become some of the survivors of a deadly global event caused by exposure to sunlight. The plane heads west in an attempt to survive this catastrophe that kills all living organisms during daylight hours. The group – led by Mathieu, the pilot, and Sylvie, a passenger who was formerly a military helicopter pilot – must work together to keep the Sun behind them. The group must deal with fuel shortage, irradiated food, hidden agendas, and other problems in their race to reach an underground military bunker.

In the second season, the remaining survivors secure their path to a NATO bunker in Bulgaria, where they seek refuge from the deadly rays of the Sun. Continuing their quest of survival with the military members in the bunker, they attempt to manage a burgeoning conflict and find a solution to the diminished supply of resources.

== Cast ==
=== Main ===
- Pauline Etienne as Sylvie Bridgette Dubois, a former military helicopter pilot.
- Laurent Capelluto as Mathieu Daniel Douek, an airline co-pilot.
- Stefano Cassetti as Terenzio Matteo Gallo, an Italian NATO officer. (season 1; guest season 2)
- Mehmet Kurtuluş as Ayaz Kobanbay, a Turkish man who runs a nightclub.
- Babetida Sadjo as Laura Djalo, a home health nurse.
- Jan Bijvoet as Richard "Rik" Mertens, a security guard.
- Ksawery Szlenkier as Jakub Kieslowski, a mechanic.
- Vincent Londez as Horst Baudin, a climate scientist.
- Regina Bikkinina as Zara Oblonskaya, a Russian mother who has a sick son, Dominik.
- Nicolas Alechine as Dominik Oblonsky, the sick son of Zara. He is suffering from cystic fibrosis.
- Alba Gaïa Bellugi as Ines Mélanie Ricci, a digital influencer and internet celebrity.
- Nabil Mallat as Osman Azizi, a Moroccan airport cleaner.
- Astrid Whettnall as Gabrielle Renoir, a flight attendant. (season 1)

=== Others ===
- Thorian De Decker as Henry Martens, Sylvie's boyfriend. (season 1)
- Martyna Peszko as Lea Kieslowski, Jakub's wife. (season 1)
- Catherine Bary as Odette Douek, Mathieu's wife. (season 1)
- Mihail Mutafov as Mr. Volkov, a patient with dementia in the care of Laura. (season 1)
- Yassine Fadel as Nabil, a young man who is a plane passenger. (recurring season 1)
- James McElvar as Freddie D. Green, a British soldier. (season 1)
- Edwin Thomas as Roger Waters, a British soldier. (season 1)
- Robbie Nock as John Morris, a British soldier. (recurring season 1)
- Laura Sépul as Chlóe. She was in an affair with Mathieu. (recurring season 1)
- Borys Szyc as Colonel Lom, the highest-ranking NATO officer in the bunker. (seasons 1–2)
- Émilie Caen as Théa Bisset, a French ambassador, who is Gerardo's partner. (season 2)
- Javier Godino as Gerardo, a French ambassador who is Théa's partner. (season 2)
- Dennis Mojen as Major Markus Müller. (season 2)
- Joe Manjon as Sergeant Felipe. He is at odds with Sylvie's group after they arrived at the bunker. (season 2)
- Coen Bril as Heremans. He is at odds with Sylvie's group after they arrived at the bunker. (season 2)
- Marie-Josée Croze as Gia Snow, an archivist working in the Svalbard Global Seed Vault. (season 2)
- Simon Duprez as Gia's husband. (season 2)
- Kıvanç Tatlıtuğ as Arman Kaya, a Turkish researcher. He is the main character of Yakamoz S-245. (season 2)

== Episodes ==
Season	Episodes	Originally released
1	6	May 1, 2020
2	6	September 8, 2021

=== Season 1 (2020) ===
No. overall	No. in season	Title	Directed by	Written by	Original release date
1	1	"Sylvie"	Inti Calfat and Dirk Verheye	Jason George	May 1, 2020
Passengers gather at Brussels Airport for a red-eye flight to Moscow. Televisions broadcast live images of people sprawled on the ground at a sporting event in day-time Melbourne and on a news set. A frantic NATO officer snatches a rifle and forces his way onto the plane, which has just begun boarding. He demands that the co-pilot take off heading west immediately, shooting him in the hand and damaging the radio. With the captain and a flight attendant left behind, Sylvie, an ex-military helicopter pilot, volunteers to assist and they take off towards Iceland. Terenzio explains that daylight is killing all living beings as it moves around the Earth. Laura, a care home worker, tends to Mathieu's wound. A passenger appears to fall ill as Ayaz disarms Terenzio. The plane closes on Keflavík International Airport, but finds it in chaos and Mathieu decides to turn back and land at RAF Kinloss, Scotland. Upon landing at the apparently deserted base, the passengers' phones show news reports validating Terenzio's claims. Three RAF servicemen drive up to the plane.
2	2	"Jakub"	Inti Calfat and Dirk Verheye	Jason George	May 1, 2020
A flashback shows Jakub, an engineer, at home with his wife. The distressed passenger dies while the soldiers warn that they must fly west and follow the night. Zara disbelieves the situation and must be forced onto the plane with her sick son, Dominik, before takeoff towards Canada. Sylvie reveals to Jakub that she had intended to commit suicide after this flight due to the death of her boyfriend, whose ashes she brought along in an urn. She is then comforted and galvanized to stay on by Jakub. Internet access is restored to the plane. After reading a news story Horst hypothesizes that there has been a burst of highly ionising gamma rays from the sun. Ayaz discovers that the British soldiers were facing court martial for rape and murder in Afghanistan, and alerts Sylvie. Upon landing in Edson, Canada, (Note: Location per English dub and its closed captioning. Dialogue in episode "Sylvie" states that a 1.5 km-long runway is needed. The Edson Airport, serving the town of Edson, Alberta, Canada, has a 1.8 km runway.) Mathieu sends the soldiers into town to search for a replacement radio, and they insist on Jakub and flight attendant Gabrielle accompanying them. Jakub attempts to lock the soldiers in a storeroom and return to the plane with Gabrielle, but leaves her behind as she mistakes Jakub's actions as being malevolent and refuses to leave with him. The plane takes off with Jakub aboard as the soldiers chase it down the runway, shooting and cracking a window.
3	3	"Mathieu"	Inti Calfat and Dirk Verheye	Jason George	May 1, 2020
In a flashback, Mathieu is shown to be unfaithful to his wife. Terenzio demands Mathieu stop making unilateral decisions as others defend the captain. An American pilot on the radio talks of a safe haven in Hawaii. Rik joins the calls for democracy onboard. Electronic malfunctions lead Mathieu to suspect one of the soldiers is stowed away in the landing gear. In response he moves to a higher altitude, but must descend again after the damaged window blows out. Ayaz, Terenzio and Jakub descend towards the undercarriage and Ayaz saves Terenzio by killing the soldier. Laura persuades Mathieu to fly lower than ideal for the benefit of Dominik. Osman, an airline employee, reveals that Ayaz cut a bag of gemstones out of the stomach of the first deceased passenger as he was buried. He admits he paid the man to smuggle the stones. The passengers discuss Ayaz's culpability for the death and he is handcuffed in the avionics bay.
4	4	"Ayaz"	Inti Calfat and Dirk Verheye	Jason George	May 1, 2020
In a flashback, Ayaz brutally beats a man threatening to sue him over the conduct of one of his prostitutes. Upon landing in Alaska, the group holds an impromptu trial of Ayaz, during which Terenzio defended him, and decides he may remain as a passenger on the flight back to Brussels after Terenzio reveals the rumored existence of a NATO shelter. Horst suggests that the solar radiation has rendered fresh food not only tasteless but also nutritionally worthless. Mathieu confesses to Sylvie an affair with the flight attendant left behind in Brussels. Mathieu appears to suffer a breakdown and is removed from the cockpit to rest. A cryptic transmission from a Russian cosmonaut is heard over the radio. Ines discovers that the Hawaii safe haven was never completed and is not a viable option for survival. Mathieu collapses in the toilet and Laura concludes his wound has gone septic, expressing an urgent need to amputate the infected tissue. Sylvie lands the plane in Brussels with only the instructions of a YouTube video read by Jakub. Horst hypothesizes that the radiation has also rendered the jet fuel they refueled with in Alaska, and likely any future jet fuel they find, largely unusable.
5	5	"Rik"	Inti Calfat and Dirk Verheye	Jason George	May 1, 2020
A flashback shows Rik conversing with a Russian online dating scam artist in joyful naivety. Jakub and Osman locate unaffected fuel for a few hundred miles of flight and refill the aircraft's tanks. Laura, Horst and Zara take Mathieu and Dominik to a nearby hospital in order to operate on the captain and gather medical supplies. Laura successfully amputates Mathieu's infected tissue. Dominik is startled by an animal that has survived the disaster. Meanwhile, Terenzio, Ayaz and Rik enter NATO Headquarters to find more information on the shelter. While Rik discovers the approximate coordinates of a bunker under a dam in Bulgaria by reviewing CCTV records, Terenzio and Ayaz come to blows in the conference room after Terenzio makes an ethnic slur. Terenzio leaves Ayaz for dead, which was seen by Rik, claiming to the others that Ayaz decided to make his own way back to the plane. Sylvie visits her home, where she intends to die next to her boyfriend's ashes, but is persuaded to return by Jakub after they share a confused kiss. As the plane prepares for takeoff to Bulgaria, a badly injured Ayaz drives onto the runway.
6	6	"Terenzio"	Inti Calfat and Dirk Verheye	Jason George	May 1, 2020
Terenzio wakes handcuffed in the avionics bay, where he has been banished by the passengers. Rik reconciles with Ayaz over leaving him in the NATO headquarters. The passengers discuss the time pressure they will face upon landing in Bulgaria, and decide to take Terenzio with them. Upon landing, they race to the bunker in two Jeeps. The first group arrives at the compound and finds the gate must be held open for the second Jeep. Terenzio volunteers to stay behind seeking redemption while the others search for the bunker. Sylvie handcuffs him to the gate controls to ensure his word is kept, intending for him to be freed by the second group when they come through. Ayaz, suffering from a head injury in the fight with Terenzio, crashes the Jeep and the group proceeds on foot. They take a wrong turn and reach a different gate. The first group finds the bunker entrance and break it open, descending the tunnel inside while Sylvie waits for the others, who arrive shortly. Unable to free himself from the handcuffs, Terenzio watches the sun rise and succumbs to its rays. The second group find Sylvie and enter the bunker together. They are met by the commanding officer, who tells Sylvie the problem of the sun can be solved with their help.

=== Season 2 (2021) ===
No. overall	No. in season	Title	Directed by	Written by	Original release date
7	1	"Zara"	Nabil Ben Yadir	Jason George	September 8, 2021
The survivors adapt to their lives in the bunker and communicate with other survivors on how to stop the Sun. A fire caused by Ines and one of the soldiers, Heremans, destroys most of the food supply, so Sylvie, Jakub, Mathieu, Ayaz, Osman, and one of the NATO officers are tasked to fly to the Svalbard Global Seed Vault, but Sylvie delays, concerned at the soldiers' possible reaction when they find Terenzio at the entrance. The Colonel suspects that Sylvie is hiding something. While Dominik is chasing a rat for an experiment, Zara stops him and both of them are accidentally trapped in the generator room in the process. Sylvie and Jakub leave to get a blowtorch from the plane to open the generator room door, but they find the plane has been destroyed, seemingly by a missile. In a flashback, Zara, then a waitress, bumps into her married lover at a restaurant and tells him that their son, Dominik, requires an expensive surgery. He promises to come in the evening, however his wife comes to her doorstep instead to tell them that she and Dominik will not receive any money from their family.
8	2	"Laura"	Nabil Ben Yadir	Jason George	September 8, 2021
In a flashback, Laura is seen at a CPR training group, where one of the other attendants convinces her to go out to dinner. During the meal, her father appears and demands she comes home with him, clearly disapproving of Laura's date. In the present, Sylvie and Jakub are still searching for a tool to free Zara. The Colonel reviews the footage from the bunker's entrance, discovering that Sylvie was the one who handcuffed Terenzio, killing him. Zara breaks open a vent to try to escape the generator room. Heremans and Felipe attempt to hold the people outside the generator room hostage unless Zara turns on the generator. Sylvie's group returns, where the Colonel shouts at the soldiers, giving Ayaz an opportunity to disarm them. Felipe's gun goes off, hitting and killing the Colonel. Osman and Ayaz continue to try to open the generator door, to no avail. Zara tells Ayaz she will turn on the generator, resulting in the death of herself and Dominik. Whilst preparing the Colonel's body for his burial, Heremans and Felipe find a USB hidden in the Colonel's pocket, containing the security footage that shows Sylvie leaving Terenzio for dead. The pair decide to avenge his death.
9	3	"Ines"	Camille Delamarre	Jason George	September 8, 2021
A flashback shows Ines leaving a hospital, which the audience later learns is because of an eating disorder. Heremans and Felipe prepare to bury the Colonel, whilst the passengers are finally able to break into the generator room. Sylvie, Thea and Mathieu discuss who should go to Norway, where Felipe convinces Sylvie to stay at the bunker. A funeral is held for Zara and Dominik. Markus gives Ines a letter. Thea confronts Felipe after learning that he told other soldiers not to attend Zara's funeral. A funeral is then held for the Colonel, including a gun salute. Markus, Thea, Jakub, Mathieu, Ayaz and Osman depart for Norway, with the first 4 attempting to find a suitable plane, and the other 2 attempting to find fuel. Sylvie meets Ines outside, where the pair goes inside to tell the bunker that the Norway group are going to take off. When they enter, they find that soldiers have gathered the rest of the passengers into a room. Sylvie is confronted with the footage found on the USB.
10	4	"Gia"	Nabil Ben Yadir	Jason George	September 8, 2021
Gia, a woman who has some form of psychosis and experiences manic episodes, is shown packing for a flight to the Seed Vault in Norway as a part of her job as an archivist. The soldiers interrogate the passengers at the bunker. The Norway group land, parking the plane on the runway to prevent any other group from landing. They travel to the seed vault, where they find all the vaults locked. They decide to sleep in the vaults and find a way in during the next night. The soldiers agree to postpone Sylvie's trial until the Norway group returns. The soldiers throw a party in the bunker, where they force Horst and Rik to box. Horst punches Felipe, and Felipe then knocks out Horst. In the seed vault, the group is awoken by Gia pointing a flare gun at Ayaz. After calming her down, Gia allows the group to enter the vault, but she is shown to be experiencing a manic episode, as Ayaz and Mathieu discover an empty bottle of antipsychotic medicine. One of the soldiers accidentally reveals to the Norway group that Ines was arrested. Heremans resorts to holding Ines at gunpoint at the radio to try to convince the Norway group that everything is ok. Ines is able to temporarily disarm Heremans and alert the Norway group that the passengers are in danger before fleeing the bunker.
11	5	"Théa"	Camille Delamarre	Jason George	September 8, 2021
Thea is shown leaving her house to board the flight to the Bulgarian bunker. She attempts to bring her cat with her, but Gerardo forces her to leave it. The Norway group discuss how to convince Gia to return with them. Sylvie devises a plan to obtain a gun whilst the soldiers sleep, in hopes of keeping the peace. Ines attempts to get into the bunker, to no avail. The Norway group create makeshift masks to try and persuade Gia, who believes that poisonous gas is the reason why her colleagues are dead. This plan succeeds, but Gia flees when she realises the group lied about the gas. Ayaz is able to bring her back, and ties her up in the cockpit. Rik goes to Gerardo to try to resolve the situation in the bunker, but accidentally reveals Sylvie's plan. Gerardo informs Felipe of Sylvie's plan. Ines takes one of the bunker's vehicles to try to find help, coming across a house with a light on. When she enters, she discovers that the light is an alarm clock in a children's room. She gathers some supplies from the house and reads Markus' letter. When she leaves, she hears a helicopter flying overhead, and begins chasing it. The soldiers plan to catch Sylvie carrying out her plan, giving her the keys to her cell. She unlocks the door and gets the other passengers, leading them to the bunker's gun supply, which she finds is empty. The soldiers and Gerardo enter, catching and detaining the group. The helicopter Ines was chasing lands, where 3 Russian soldiers from the Russian bunker emerge. Ines takes them to the Bulgarian bunker, where they blow open the door. Ines alerts the Norway group of the situation. Whilst speaking with Ines, Ayaz accidentally leaves a crowbar in the cockpit, allowing Gia to break free from her constraints. Gia locks the cockpit door and experiences a mental breakdown, causing her to grab a fire extinguisher and begin smashing the controls, completely destroying them.
12	6	"Asil"	Camille Delamarre	Jason George	September 8, 2021
Horst is shown in an office in a flashback, where his boss ends their relationship. The 3 Russian soldiers find Gerardo, Heremans and Felipe in a room, when one of the soldiers kills Gerardo. The 2 soldiers escorting Sylvie's group leave them to respond to the gunshot, allowing the group to escape. Felipe calms down the situation, and Sylvie's group is quickly found again. The group, along with Ines, is locked inside a storage room. Felipe and the Russians discuss who could've bombed the airbase and the Russian bunker. A submarine is seen travelling underwater. The Norway group try and find someway into the cockpit, but ultimately decide to return to the seed vault, leaving Gia to die by the Sun, allowing them to enter via the windscreen when the Sun sets again. The submarine is seen heading towards an ice-covered land, presumably towards the seed bank. Sylvie and the other passengers discuss a plan to escape the bunker and take the Russians' helicopter, creating a makeshift blowtorch to enter a vent above them. Sylvie cuts the power to the bunker in the generator room, allowing the group to flee the bunker using Dominik's night vision helmet. Felipe and Heremans restore the power, and take the Russians with them to chase after Sylvie's group. As the helicopter powers up, Rik jumps out and enters a truck, ultimately sacrificing himself by crashing into Heremans and Felipe's car, preventing them from shooting down the helicopter. A man from the submarine is shown entering the seed vault. Ayaz confronts Markus about his letter to Ines, revealing that Markus was the one that locked Zara and Dominik in the generator room, under the Colonel's orders, attempting to scare Zara. Ayaz holds Markus at gunpoint. The man begins running down the vault towards Ayaz, distracting him and allowing Markus to flee. Ayaz attempts to shoot Markus, and fires one more shot towards the man coming down the hallway. The final scene shows that one of the rats from Horst's experiments outside the bunker has survived.

== Production ==
=== Development ===
On September 3, 2019, it was announced that Netflix had given the production a series order for a 6-episode first season. The series is created by Jason George who is also credited as an executive producer of the series alongside, D.J. Talbot, Tomek Baginski and Jacek Dukaj. Production companies involved with the series were slated to consist of Entre chien et loup. On July 1, 2020, the series was renewed by Netflix for a second season, which premiered on September 8, 2021.

=== Casting ===
On September 30, 2019, it was confirmed that Mehmet Kurtuluş, Astrid Whettnall, Pauline Etienne, Bebetida Sadjo, Laurent Capelluto, Alba Bellugi, Nabil Mallat, Regina Bikkinina, Vincent Londez, Jan Bijvoet, Stefano Cassetti, Ksawery Szlenkier, Yassine Fadel, Laura Sepul and Nicolas Aleshine had been cast in the series.

== Release ==
On April 24, 2020, Netflix released the official trailer for the series. Season 1 was released in May 2020.

== Spin-off ==
In October 2020, Netflix announced their upcoming Turkish slate to include a submarine-set limited series, described as a "fast-paced action adventure story", starring Kıvanç Tatlıtuğ, directed by Tolga Karaçelik, and written by Atasay Koç, Cansu Çoban, Sami Berat Marçalı and Jason George. Ahead of the series release, Tatlıtuğ appeared as Arman in an episode of the second season of Into the Night, revealing the in-development series to be a spin-off of Into the Night, set concurrently with the first two seasons and titled Yakamoz S-245.

== Reception ==
=== Critical response ===
The review aggregator website Rotten Tomatoes reported an 88% approval rating for the first season with an average rating of 8.7/10, based on 18 reviews.

== See also ==
- Inconstant Moon—a short story with a similar theme
- The Langoliers by Stephen King
