= Red-eye flight =

Flight scheduled to depart at night and arrive the next morning

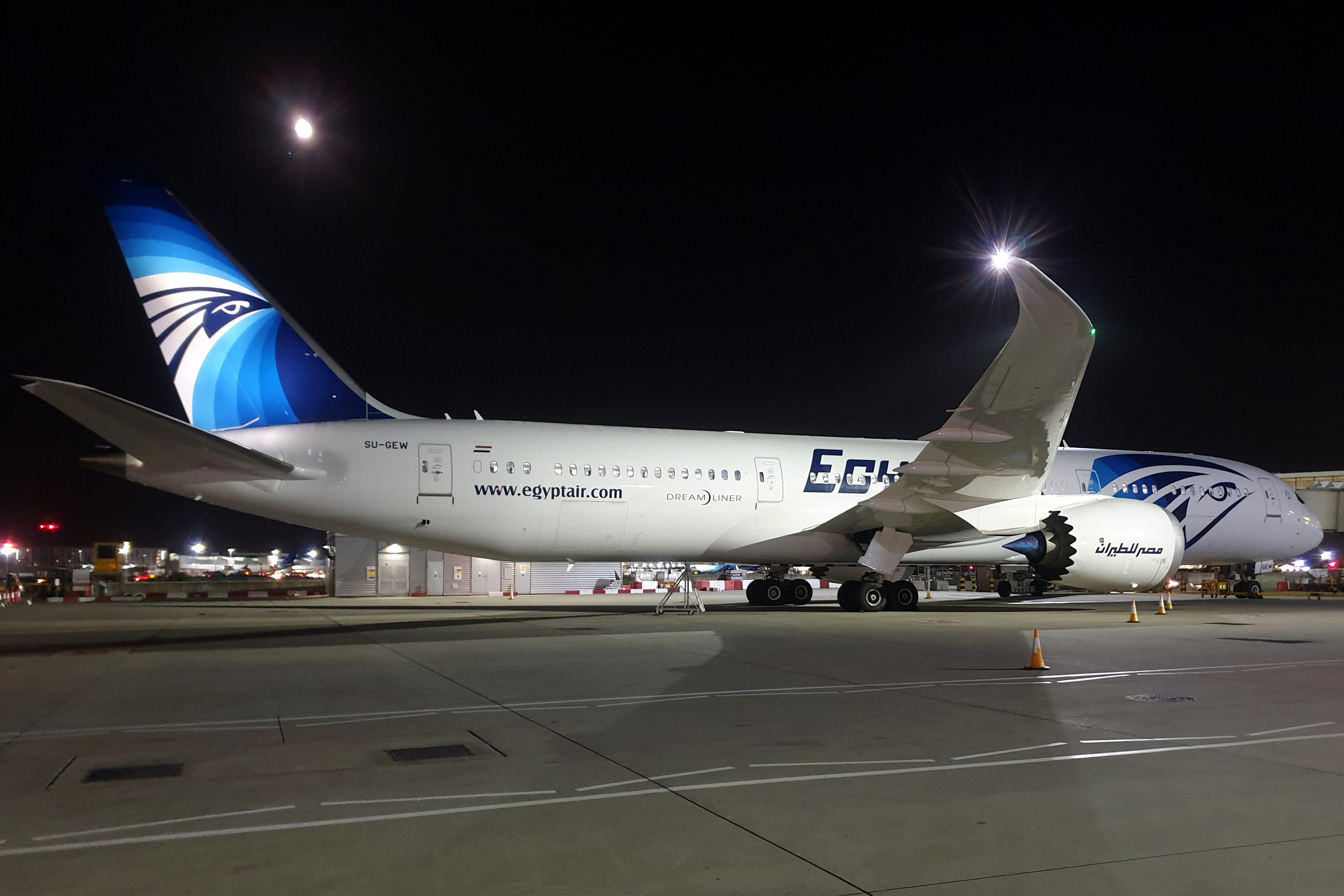
An EgyptAir Boeing 787 prepares for a red-eye flight from London Heathrow to Cairo

In commercial aviation, a red-eye flight refers to a flight that departs at night and arrives the next morning, especially when the total flight time is insufficient for passengers to get a full night's sleep.

The term derives from red eyes as a symptom of fatigue.

== Causes and utilities ==
For the airline, overnight flights enable more use of aircraft that would otherwise stand idle. For airports, it may be rational to divert the stream of passengers away from peak hours. In major airports, the capacity for flight operations during daytime may be fully exhausted, and the price of airport slots may be higher at peak hours.

For passengers, the benefits and disadvantages are more subjective. While overnight flights are often less costly, many will perceive it difficult to arrive well-rested after a night flight, especially if it is at odd hours or too short to fit into a full night's sleep. However, the traffic to and from the airport, as well as the airport experience, may be less stressful at these hours. Some passengers may want to arrive early in a city and return the same day, saving on a night's accommodation, or enjoy one full day at the beginning or end of the trip. It has been claimed that red-eye flights are popular among business travelers who benefit from flying at night.

== Examples ==
One definition of a red-eye flight is one that is too short to allow a full night's sleep. An example would be those flights from Los Angeles to New York City—about five hours' flying time—that depart between 2100 and 0100 Pacific time, and arrive between 0500 and 0900 Eastern time.

=== Asia ===
- Japan Airlines used to operate red-eye flights from Hong Kong to Tokyo Haneda, but it has switched to daytime flights. Taipei/Hong Kong to Japan is also a typical red eye, with flights departing between 1 and 2 am and arriving between 6 and 7 am. Cathay Pacific still operates one flight each to Tokyo Narita and Osaka, while All Nippon Airways operates red-eye flights from Hong Kong to Tokyo's Haneda daily.
- Asiana, Korean Air, and Cathay Pacific operate red-eye flights from Hong Kong to Seoul. Asiana operates flights to Busan. HK Express flies a red eye flight from Seoul to Hong Kong. From March 2026, Cathay Pacific also adds a red-eye flight on this route.
- Cathay Pacific operates many red-eye flights outside of Tokyo and Seoul. These include red-eye flights between Hong Kong and cities in Australia and New Zealand in both directions, as well as between Hong Kong and Singapore. Cathay Pacific flights that are red-eye only in the Hong Kong-bound direction include those from Bangkok, Beijing and Kuala Lumpur. Cathay Pacific flights that are red-eye only from Hong Kong include those to parts of Japan, and Urumuqi. Except for a few London bound departures, all of Cathay Pacific's flights to Europe depart around midnight and arrive at their destinations at 6–8 am, with many other carriers implementing a similar schedule for flights bound for Europe and the Middle East from East Asian cities. The same goes to Australia-bound routes, with the flights usually departing between 6 pm and 10 pm, and arriving between 6 am and 9 am.
- Chinese Airlines that leave in the northern part of China (e.g. Beijing, Shanghai) for Europe destinations that will fly through Russia. This makes the flight time shorter, with the flights departing at late night (2 am or 3 am) and arrive in the morning (6 am to 9 am).
- Flights that leave India and Southwest Asia around midnight arrive in Bangkok, Hong Kong, Kuala Lumpur, and Singapore early morning.
- Philippine Airlines also operates red-eye flights from Korea and Japan back to Manila, which also have regular late-night flights from Manila to Singapore and Kuala Lumpur.
- Many flights from Southeast Asia to Japan, Korea, and China depart in the evenings or around midnight, and land at the destinations in the early morning. There are also flights that depart Japan, Korea, or China around midnight, and arrive in Southeast Asia in the early morning.
- Indonesian airlines operate overnight red-eye flights from Jakarta to the easternmost province of Papua. With a flight time of four to five hours and a two-hour time difference, most red-eye flights depart shortly before midnight and arrive around 6 am. Garuda Indonesia also operates daily overnight flights to the East Asia's Tokyo, Seoul and Beijing, leaving Jakarta at midnight and arriving at around 6 am the next morning. Garuda Indonesia applies a similar daily overnight flight schedule for its Australia-bound flight routes, departing from Jakarta and Denpasar just before midnight and arriving in Sydney and Melbourne at around 9 am the next morning.
- Pakistan International Airlines flies red-eye flights to Lahore, Pakistan from Jeddah, Saudi Arabia, as well as flights from Manchester, Birmingham and London to Pakistan.
- Turkish Airlines flies red-eye flights to Istanbul, Turkey from Malé, Maldives.
- Singapore Airlines flies red-eye flights to Singapore from Malé, Maldives.
- Gulf Air flies red-eye flights from Bahrain to Malé, Maldives.
- El Al flies red-eye flights to many Western European destinations, as well as London–Heathrow and London–Luton.
- Former U.S. carrier Northwest Airlines used to fly from Tokyo–Narita to other regional Asian destinations such as Seoul–Incheon, Busan, Beijing–Capital, Shanghai–Pudong, Guangzhou Baiyun International Airport, Hong Kong, Taipei–Taoyuan, Kaohsiung, Manila, Ho Chi Minh City, Bangkok–Suvarnabhumi, Kuala Lumpur–International, and Singapore, with flights departing Tokyo between 5pm and 7pm, and arriving at other Far East destinations between 8pm and midnight.

From Taipei to the west coast of the US, EVA Air flies red eyes leaving at 10 am or 10 pm and arriving at 7 am or 7 pm the same day.

=== Australia ===
The majority of transcontinental flights are operated during the day, but as of 2010, red-eye flights operate from Perth to Sydney, Brisbane, Cairns, Canberra and Melbourne, and from Darwin to Sydney, Brisbane and Melbourne. Red-eye flights have previously operated from Australia to New Zealand and Fiji.

Red-eye flights to Australia operate from various locations in Southeast Asia and North America, such as Scoot's flights from Singapore to Gold Coast, Sydney, and Melbourne. Jetstar offers red-eye flights between Melbourne and Auckland with the flight departing Melbourne just before midnight and arriving in Auckland at 5:30 am.

Another example would be Qantas flights from Los Angeles to Brisbane, Sydney and Melbourne, and from Dallas to Sydney) generally leaving 10 pm to 11 pm and arriving from 5 am to 8 am. While they do fly during the night (this is more a product of large time zone differences) the flights take around 15 hours (giving more time to sleep) and westward flight stretches out the local length of day and night. Furthermore, as the flight crosses the International Date Line, flights arrive roughly two days later in local time.

=== Latin America ===
LATAM Brasil, Azul Brazilian Airlines and Gol Transportes Aéreos all offer red-eye flights in Brazil, popularly known as "Big Owl," after a late-night film session broadcast by Rede Globo (Portuguese: Corujão), with over 50 different routes throughout Brazil, all departing between 10 pm and 6 am. Usually these flights originate in Brasília, Belo Horizonte, Campinas, Rio de Janeiro, Salvador, or São Paulo and are bound for Manaus, Belém, Porto Velho, Northeast Brazil, North America, Argentina, and Europe.

Another example is Copa Airlines, which operates several red-eye flights to Argentina, Chile, Bolivia, and several other destinations within Latin America.

=== Europe ===
Red-eye flights to Europe were once meant to apply exclusively to the morning arrivals of transatlantic flights from the American East Coast to Western Europe. Such traffic now comprises the busiest of the long-haul air routes. The first of these flights, from the busiest destinations of New York and Washington D.C., will arrive at the major European airports at London Heathrow, Frankfurt, Amsterdam, Paris, and Dublin between 5 am and 11 am local time (and are still subject to costly night-flying restrictions), hence increasing the number of flights to and from a wide range of American/European destinations.

Travelling from Europe, red-eye flights are scheduled out of Madrid, Barcelona, Paris, and Frankfurt. The flight time is of three to five hours, with typical departure around midnight, and arrival around dawn the next day. Most airlines from the Middle East and Asia operate red-eye services from major Western European destinations. One example is London Heathrow, where the last departures, leaving between 22.30 and 23.00, are eastbound medium-haul services to destinations such as Tel Aviv. Also, long-haul services depart Europe and arrive in Asia at practically in the morning of the next day (For example, leaving London at 2 pm and arriving at Hong Kong at 9 am (Summer)/10 am (Winter) the next day.) In the Island of Jersey the red-eye flight is the earliest to leave each day for London, for which the aircraft is already on the ground in Jersey overnight and where the early start for passengers cuts short a full night's sleep.

=== Russia ===
Russian airlines operate similarly to U.S. airlines by connecting Moscow to Yakutsk, Irkutsk, and Vladivostok. They last five to eight hours but due to the northerly latitude the flights can cross as many as eight time zones during this interval, drastically enlarging the time difference. The flights depart Moscow around 6 pm and arrive at the eastern cities around 6 am the next day. One of the current examples of red-eye flight is Aeroflot's SU783 from Moscow to Magadan, departing 11:05 pm Moscow time and arriving 2:00 pm Vladivostok Time on the next day, with a flight time of approximately eight hours.

=== South Africa ===
Many medium and long-haul flights to/from South Africa and Europe, other African destinations and the Middle East make use of red-eye flights and longitudinal advantages (similar time zones) so that passengers can arrive at their destinations early in the morning and benefit from minimal time zone changes due to South Africa's geographic position. This makes it an efficient and convenient way to travel between each area.

=== United States and Canada ===
Red-eye flights frequently connect West Coast cities to East Coast cities. These typically depart the West Coast between 9 pm and 1 am, and have a flight time of three to six hours but gain between two and four hours due to the time difference, arriving on the East Coast between 5 am and 9 am. American Airlines, United Airlines, Delta Air Lines, Alaska Airlines, Air Canada, JetBlue, Southwest Airlines and other U.S. and Canadian carriers operate red-eye flights that depart from the West Coast at night from cities such as Los Angeles, Vancouver, Calgary, San Francisco, and Seattle, among others, arriving in Boston, New York, Toronto, Washington, D.C., and other East Coast cities in the morning. Red-eye flights also connect Hawaii or Alaska with West Coast mainland cities, departing from Honolulu between 10pm and midnight or Anchorage between midnight and 3 am and arriving in Los Angeles, San Francisco, or Seattle between 5 am and 7 am. Flights from Tokyo to Honolulu are considered red-eye flights, as the flights are usually overnight flights that are six to seven hours.

From the conterminous US, there are flights departing between midnight and 2 am, headed towards East Asian destinations such as Japan, Korea, Taiwan, China, and Hong Kong and arriving between 5 am and 7 am.

== In popular culture ==
Films involving red-eye flights include Airport 1975 (1974), Airplane! (1980), The Langoliers (1995), Turbulence (1997), Red Eye (2005), Snakes on a Plane (2006), and Non-Stop (2014).

The 2020 TV series Into the Night includes a red-eye flight in its central premise.

The term is used metaphorically in a lyric from Billie Eilish's song "i love you" on the album When We All Fall Asleep, Where Do We Go.
