= Inti Calfat =

Belgian director and screenwriter

- Born: 1981 (age 44–45); Porlamar, Venezuela
- Education: Maastricht University
- Occupations: Director, screenwriter
- Known for: Over Water; Into the Night; Safe Harbor; Toos: The Van der Valk Kidnapping

Inti Calfat (born 1981) is a Belgian director and screenwriter. He is a co-creator of the Netflix series Toos: The Van der Valk Kidnapping (2026).

Calfat started out directing television programmes and music videos. His video for Zornik's "The Enemy" won the 2011 MIA audience award for best music video and the award for best music video at the European Independent Film Festival. With Dirk Verheye he forms the directing duo Norman Bates. Together they directed the Flemish series Over Water, for which they were nominated for an Ensor, and the first season of Into the Night, the first Belgian Netflix original. Later work includes L'Opéra, Safe Harbor and Toos.

== Early life and education ==
Calfat was born in 1981 on the Venezuelan island of Margarita, to an Argentine father and a Belgian mother. When he was two, the family moved to Belgium, where he grew up in Leuven. He studied arts and culture (cultuurwetenschappen) at Maastricht University. He lives in Brussels.

== Career ==
After his studies Calfat began directing television programmes and music videos. He met Dirk Verheye on a screenwriting course, and the two soon began making films together. From then on they worked as a directing duo. Under the name Norman Bates, after the character in Alfred Hitchcock's Psycho, they have directed commercials for many years, in Belgium and abroad, for brands including Coca-Cola, Mercedes and Samsonite.

=== Music videos, short film and screenwriting ===
Calfat directed the music video for "The Enemy" by Zornik. The video was nominated for the audience award for best music video at the Music Industry Awards for 2010, and Zornik won that award in January 2011. In April 2011 the video won the award for best music video at the European Independent Film Festival in Paris; according to Het Belang van Limburg, the jury praised Calfat's cinematic imagery. He also made videos for Tom Helsen and Milow, including Milow's "We Must Be Crazy".

For the girls' choir Scala, Calfat made the short film Useful, in which the choir sings its own arrangement of a song by Kings of Leon. The film is about a woman who can no longer be intimate with her husband and encourages him to visit a prostitute. Useful won the award for best international experimental short at the New York Independent Film Festival and the Young Directors' Award at the Cristal Festival in Crans-Montana.

As a screenwriter, Calfat and his co-writers received screenwriting grants (scenariosteun) from the Flanders Audiovisual Fund (VAF) for two feature films, in 2018 and 2025.

=== Commercials ===
In 2014 Calfat and Verheye directed Birth for the French agency BETC, the promotional film for the Young Director Award, a prize for young directors at the Cannes Lions advertising festival. For DDB Brussels they made the film for Don't Google It, a campaign for CEBAM (gezondheidenwetenschap.be) against searching symptoms online. The campaign won two gold awards at the Belgian CCB Awards in 2015 and the Diamond Cuckoo Award. The Spa campaign Circle of Life by the agency Darwin, whose film they directed, received a certificate for outstanding creativity at the Mobius Awards in Los Angeles in early 2016.

In late 2016 they directed All in One for the Chinese company Alibaba, a film conceived by the agency Fred & Farid Shanghai for Singles' Day. Its text consists of advertising slogans of well-known brands such as Nike, Dove and Levi's. In 2017 the film won bronze in the film category at Spikes Asia, the Asian advertising festival in Singapore. They also made the film for Dare to Sponsor (2018), a campaign by the agency LDV United for Special Olympics Belgium. The campaign won a gold Effie in Belgium in 2019.

=== Television ===
The first television series Calfat and Verheye directed was Over Water for the Flemish channel Eén, written by Paul Baeten Gronda and Tom Lenaerts and produced by Panenka. They directed the first season, whose first two episodes premiered at Film Fest Gent in October 2018. VRT NWS called them "notable fiction debutants". For their direction of Over Water, Norman Bates was nominated for an Ensor, the Flemish film and television award, in 2019. They directed the second season (2020) together with Deben Van Dam.

In September 2019 Netflix announced that Calfat and Verheye would direct Into the Night, the first Belgian Netflix original. The six-part series was created and written by showrunner Jason George and produced by the Brussels company Entre Chien et Loup. It was filmed around Sofia. The series was released on 1 May 2020. Shortly after its launch it was the most watched programme on Netflix in Belgium; over 2020 as a whole it was the most watched science fiction series on Netflix in Turkey and the second most watched in Germany. Calfat and Verheye directed all six episodes of the first season; the second season was directed by others. Reviewing the series, David Farnor wrote that the directors kept things just believable enough to sustain the tension, leaving the scale of the disaster largely off screen so that what was shown remained convincing.

For the French channel OCS, Calfat and Verheye directed episodes of the drama series L'Opéra (2021). The series' directors, Calfat among them, were nominated for best direction at the 2022 awards of the French Association des Critiques de Séries. With Arne Toonen and Mark Williams, co-creator of Ozark, they directed the first season of the eight-part crime series Safe Harbor (2025), whose cast includes Alfie Allen, Jack Gleeson and Charlie Murphy.

With Maaik Krijgsman and Carl Joos, Calfat created the Netflix series Toos: The Van der Valk Kidnapping, inspired by the 1982 kidnapping of Toos van der Valk. Krijgsman and Joos wrote the screenplay; Calfat and Verheye directed. The series was produced by Submarine, and Netflix set its release for 26 November 2026.

== Awards and nominations ==
- 2011: MIA for best music video (audience award, to Zornik) for "The Enemy", as the video's director
- 2011: Best music video, European Independent Film Festival, for "The Enemy"
- Best international experimental short, New York Independent Film Festival, for Useful
- 2012: Young Directors' Award, Cristal Festival (Crans-Montana), for Useful
- 2019: Nomination, best direction, Ensors, for Over Water (as Norman Bates)
- 2022: Nomination, best direction, Association des Critiques de Séries, for L'Opéra (with Stéphane Demoustier, Laïla Marrakchi, Cécile Ducrocq and Dirk Verheye)

== Television ==
Year	Title	Network	Role
2018–2020	Over Water	Eén	Director
2020	Into the Night	Netflix	Director (season 1)
2021	L'Opéra	OCS	Director
2025	Safe Harbor	Videoland / Streamz	Director
2026	Toos: The Van der Valk Kidnapping	Netflix	Co-creator, director
