= Perfect Imperfection =

Perfect Imperfection may refer to:

- Perfect Imperfection (novel), a 2004 science fiction novel by Jacek Dukaj
- Perfect Imperfection (film), a 2016 Chinese film
- Perfect Imperfection (Sean Forbes album), 2012
- Perfect Imperfection (Eric Cantona album), 2026

== See also ==
- Perfectly Imperfect (disambiguation)
