= Black Oceans =

2001 novel by Jacek Dukaj

Czarne oceany
- Polish edition cover
- Author: Jacek Dukaj
- Original title: Czarne oceany
- Translator: not translated
- Cover artist: Tomasz Bagiński
- Language: Polish
- Genre: Science fiction
- Publisher: Supernowa
- Publication date: 2001
- Publication place: Poland
- Media type: (Hardback & Paperback)
- Pages: 494
- ISBN: 83-7054-149-6
- OCLC: 63517009

Czarne oceany (literally "Black Oceans") is a science fiction novel by Polish writer Jacek Dukaj, published in Poland by Supernowa in 2001. The novel fits in the hard science fiction genre, describing the late-21st century Earth facing technological singularity. The novel received the prime Polish award for sci-fi literature, Janusz A. Zajdel Award, for 2001.

== Development ==
The novel was cut down at the publisher's request from over 1000 pages to fewer than 500. The first seven chapters as well as several extra chapters which were cut from the printed versions are published free on Dukaj's website.

== Plot summary ==
=== The world ===
The year is around 2060. The United States is still a leading power, but European and Asian powers are trailing close behind it. Technology has advanced, with biotechnological implants allowing people control over computers via brain-computer interfaces. Full immersion virtual reality is common, as well as 'Orto Virtual Reality' - mixing virtual reality with our reality, in effect 'skinning' our reality in a form of augmented reality. Much of the elite is genetically engineered as well, with AIs being increasingly common. In many ways this is a dark, cyberpunk-kind of a world.

However, the conflicts of this future era rely more on economics and market forces than advanced military hardware. In this world the stock market is the new battleground for nations and megacorps.

Technological trends are far from only ones explored by Dukaj in his book. He portrays the futuristic bureaucracy, political power struggles behind private sector, government and the military, and changes in culture. Dukaj extrapolates from the current trend of increasing lawsuits and political correctness: in his world many people willingly live under constant mass surveillance of the New Etiquette (NEti), which registers all their actions so that they couldn't be falsely accused of some "personal offense crime".

=== The story ===
The main character, Nicholas Hunt, is an American politician and lobbyist, closely involved with some branches of secret military research including paranormal activities. He is not a hero: as Dukaj himself describes him, he is "a cynical, egoistic bureaucrat, whose main motivation for all of his decisions in his job is, it seems, covering his ass". Currently he has lost an internal power struggle and is assigned to oversee what seems like a dead-end, low-key project. Soon, however, his project starts to gain more importance, as scientists explore some promising theories from the borders of memetics and telepathy, including study of potential lifeforms that would use memes just as we use genes, and develop new sciences like psychomemetics.

Suddenly a strange cataclysm takes place, with millions of people worldwide going insane and many densely populated areas becoming a 'no-go' zone. Nicholas Hunt is not sure if this is an alien invasion, a result of military or corporate experiment, anew step in human evolution, or the result of the transformation into a post-technological singularity world.

== Awards ==
The novel received the prime Polish award for science fiction literature, Janusz A. Zajdel Award, for 2001.

== Analysis ==
The novel was discussed in the context of transhumanism and cyberpunk.

== Reception ==
In 2001 in his review for Gazeta Wyborcza, Wojciech Orliński, praised the book for its vivid and realistic portrayal of the near future, although criticized the plot for being somewhat convoluted, and some dialogues for being too much of infodumps. He also noted that the book has gained a cult status years before its actual publication.
