= Perfectly Imperfect (platform) =

Online newsletter

- Founded: 2020
- Website: www.pi.fyi

Perfectly Imperfect is an online newsletter and social media platform. It was initially founded in 2020 as a biweekly email newsletter that focused on recommendations. In January 2024, Perfectly Imperfect launched PI.FYI, a social media platform. The platform is based around sharing recommendations. Its main feed is presented in reverse chronological order and is not algorithmically curated.

== History ==
Perfectly Imperfect was started during the COVID-19 pandemic by Tyler Bainbridge, alongside college friends Alex Cushing and Serey Morm, whom he met at UMass Lowell; Morm later departed. Motivated by a dissatisfaction with algorithm-driven recommendation culture, they launched on Substack in September 2020. Its early newsletter format, PI, published brief recommendation lists and personal notes from contributors. Contributors have included a mix of underground artists and more established creative figures, such as Charli XCX, Chloe Cherry, Chloe Wise, and Meetka Otto. In October 2024, PI announced it was leaving Substack to launch its own site.

== Overview ==
The current platform, PI.FYI, features both editorial content (guest columns, long-form essays, staff picks) and user-generated recommendations. The platform also supports "Ask" posts, where users can solicit recommendations from the community, and allows commenting, liking, and profile customization. In August 2025, it launched an events feature. In 2022, Perfectly Imperfect hosted their first offline event at Baby's All Right in Brooklyn, with a performance by The Dare. They have since expanded their event promotion/sponsorship to markets such as Los Angeles, San Francisco, and even Auckland.
