= Xavras Wyżryn =

1997 novel by Jacek Dukaj

- Author: Jacek Dukaj
- Cover artist: Bogusław Polch
- Language: Polish
- Genre: Science fiction, Alternate history
- Published: 1997 (SuperNOVA) (1st edition), Wydawnictwo Literackie (2nd edition)
- Publication place: Poland
- Media type: Paperback, printed in both editions with author's other novels
- Pages: 150 (counted excluding other novels printed within the same paperback)
- ISBN: 83-7054-118-6 (1st edition)
- OCLC: 39273390

Xavras Wyżryn [ˈksävräs ˈvɨ̞ʐrɨ̞̃n] is an alternate history novel by the Polish science fiction writer Jacek Dukaj, published in 1997. An alternate history novels, it discusses Polish martyrology, circling on the philosophical aspects of war, shows the thin line between terrorism and freedom fighters. It has lots of action, which makes it a member of a military science fiction genre.

The story's divergence point is set during the Polish–Soviet War by ending in a decisive Soviet victory. The actual story takes place in the 1990s and is told from the point of view of an American reporter, who is an embedded journalist with the anti-Soviet Polish resistance.

In 1996, a young American reporter, Ian Smith, is sent by his news network to the Soviet republic of Poland, to document guerrilla actions of Polish freedom fighters against the Soviet regime. His task includes interviewing the charimastic leader of Polish Freedom Army, Colonel Xavras Wyżryn. Smith does not realize that during his long trip from Ukrainian steppes to Moscow along with hardened veterans of Polish forces, he will experience the horror of war in which there is no good and evil side. He also expect to find himself in the midst of the most reckless of Wyżryn's campaigns in which the Polish forces capture a Soviet atomic bomb and start to smuggle it towards Moscow.

== Editions ==
The story has had two editions. It was first published in 1997, in a book entitled Xavras Wyżryn, which contained the title story with a second one, "Zanim Noc" ("Before the Night").

In 2004, the story was reprinted in Xavras Wyżryn i inne fikcje narodowe (Xavras Wyżryn and Other National Fictions) and was this time accompanied by the following three short stories: "Sprawa Rudryka Z." ("The Case of Rudryk Z."), "Przyjaciel prawdy" ("Friend of the Truth") and "Gotyk" ("Gothic").

== Summary ==
=== Backstory ===
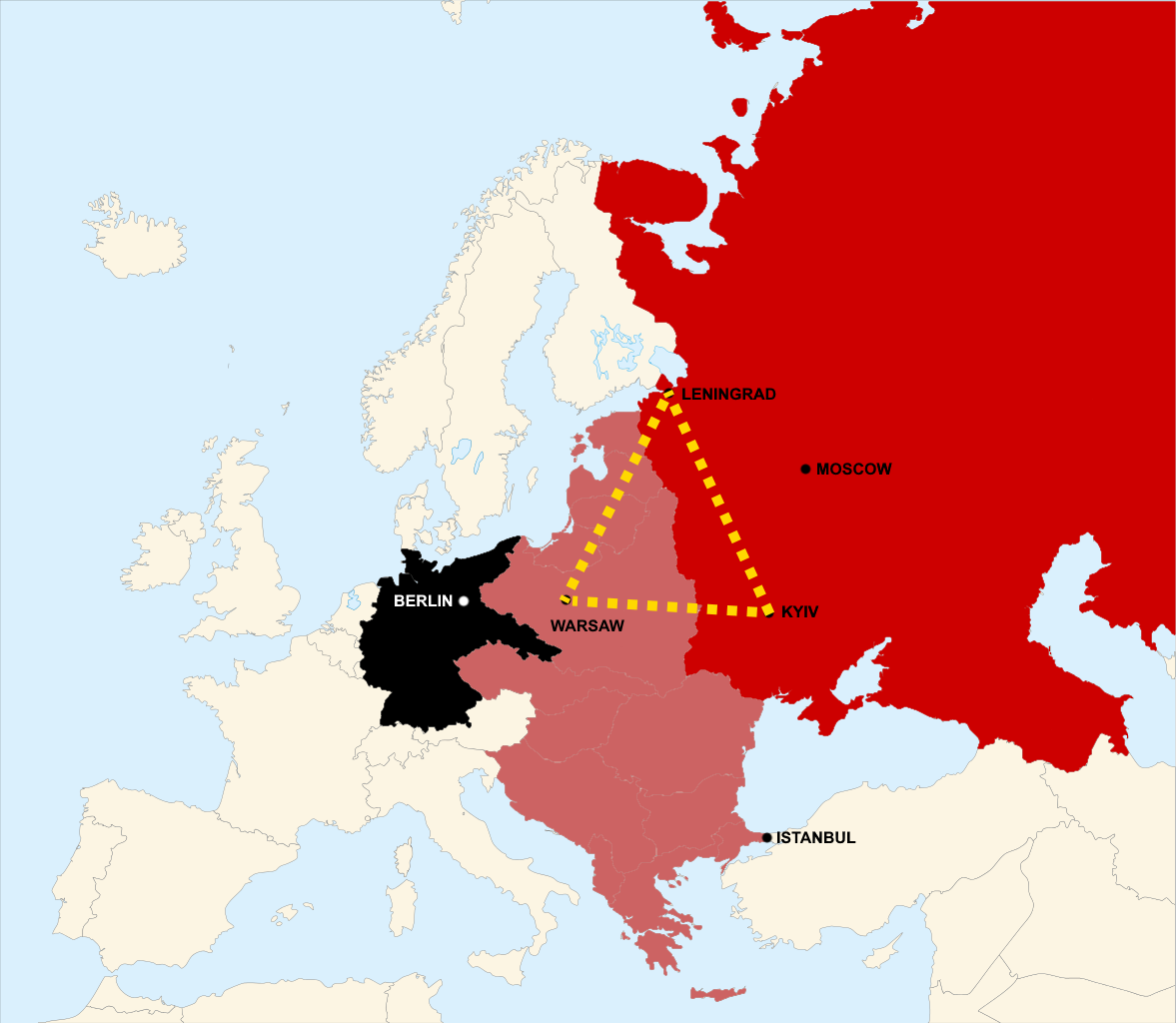
Map of Europe in "Xavras Wyżryn". Dark red is USSR, light red is European War Zone (EWZ), black is Germany. Yellow dotted lines describe borders of Atomic Triangle.

After World War I, Poland managed to regain its freedom but not for long since the Polish–Soviet War was lost in 1920. Poland became a Soviet republic, along with the Ukraine and the Baltic states. In the Soviet Union, Joseph Stalin quickly took the chair of first secretary, and his regime tried to eradicate the Polish culture to prevent any Polish uprisings of the kind that had shaken the Russian Empire in the 19th century. Thousands of Polish civilians were sent to Siberia. Speaking Polish or using the national symbols of Poland was punishable by death.

The increased power of the Soviet Union and the Republic of China meant that the League of Nations soon signed treaties with the Soviets that allowed them to annex Poland. Meanwhile, another power rose in the south since the followers of Islam created a huge empire in the Middle East. The United States was far enough to ignore European problems but supported those armies conflict with the Soviet forces. Those conflicts were relatively minor and were mostly only "border engagements", as the media called them.

In 1935, however, the "Great Bolshevik War" had the Soviets attempt to take control over Western Europe. The war took place mostly on the former Polish and Ukrainian territories and lasted until 1944, when Allied forces dropped three atomic bombs on Leningrad, Kyiv and Warsaw to stop the Soviet armies. Millions were killed in the explosions, and many more died of radiation poisoning. The area between the three bombed cities became known as the "Atomic Triangle". Children born there died at a young age from radiation sickness, and the few who survived were consumed by mutations.

The Bolshevik War ended with the Treaties of Berlin, which were signed on Prussian territory. The Soviet Union and the League of Nations agreed to stop the bloodshed. Still, the countries taken by force in 1920 remained Soviet republics.

After Stalin's death at the end of 1981, the Soviet regime in Poland eased up slightly, but the Soviets still maintained a huge garrison force there since they remembered all the Polish uprisings in Russia during the partitions of Poland. People living inside the "Atomic Triangle" became hardened nearly soulless creatures, balanced on the edge of death and became numb because of the great suffering of the whole nation. Meanwhile, the Soviets had some minor border conflicts with China, Sweden and Prussia.

The status quo lasted until 1988, when Xavras Wyżryn appeared. He quickly organised a considerable guerrilla force, commanded his troops with uncommon charisma and valour and fought the Soviets on their own ground. His legend quickly spread around the world, and his victories inspired other nations to fight against the Soviets. Many local conflicts started, when Hungary, the Balkans, Czechoslovakia and Ukraine also started their own revolutions against Soviet occupants. In the south, the power of the Islamic empire increased under the command of a figure known only as Muhammad's Son. The war in the Middle East began and was reminiscent of the old wars between the Russian Empire and the Ottoman Empire. In the east, China took the opportunity to attack the weakened Soviets and started yet another conflict. The whole Central-Eastern Europe was now known the European War Zone (EWZ), and reached as far as Constantinople in the south, Finland in the north, the border with Prussia in the west and the Dnieper River in the east. Battles took place mostly on radiated polluted territory.

=== Main plot ===
The plot of the novel starts in 1996. The whole European War Zone is no man's land, and its Soviet control is based on a strategy of "shoot first, ask questions later". Various partisan groups in an uneasy truce one another are scattered throughout the area and engaged in battles against small Soviet garrisons. German troops make occasional raids across the Polish border to test Soviet defences, and the Soviets retaliate in kind. Meanwhile, China's forces advance toward the Ural Mountains, and Muhammad's Son prepares a jihad in the Middle East. The US government secretly finances the guerrillas, and Western Europe fortifies its borders to defend against presumed Soviet or a Chinese attack, the latter of which is more feared.

== Main characters ==
- Colonel Xavras Wyżryn is the commander of the AWP or Armia Wyzwolenia Polski (Polish Liberation Army), a considerable guerrilla force fighting the Soviet army in the European War Zone. His past is a mystery. He was born within the "Atomic Triangle" and has a visible mutation - the skin on his hands is red, as if burned. He was a junior officer in the Red Army, until he deserted and formed the AWP. He is a truly charismatic leader, inspiring his men to do unbelievable things, even sacrificing their lives for the "higher cause". For the freedom of his country he is capable of killing everyone standing in his way, including women, children and even his own men, calling this a "sacrifice for a better future". He is seen as a terrorist by the Soviets and as a romantic, tragic hero in the West. In the United States, Metro-Goldwyn-Mayer has even made a blockbuster movie about him, entitled "Uncatchable". A major US news network signed a contract with Wyżryn, offering him $250 million for exclusive interviews and footage from battlefields. Xavras understands the importance of media and propaganda in modern warfare, so he censors the footage before it is sent to the network and makes himself a television celebrity.
- Ian Smith - US news reporter sent by the network to film Xavras' actions. Because of his Polish descent and linguistic abilities, he is the network's natural choice after the previous reporter attached to Wyżryn was killed in action. Raised in a democratic country, he has moral doubts about Xavras and considers his brutal methods no better than the Soviet ones. The story is told from his point of view.
- Jewriej (English: Yevrey) - Xavras' mysterious aide and advisor, with his face hidden behind a Balaclava, because of his alleged disfigurement, the result of mutation. It is said that radiation gave him precognition abilities and that Xavras is using them to escape Russian ambushes and to plan his actions.
- Sienkiewicz's Triple - Three trusted companions of Xavras, who took their names (Michał, Andrzej and Jan) after the characters from the books of Henryk Sienkiewicz. Their missions are mostly undercover and they can almost literally disappear. It is they who lead Smith to Xavras' hideout.
- Two Bodyguards - Xavras' guards, which are named by Ian after the biblical quotes printed on their T-shirts, because he does not know their real names and they look like twin brothers: "Another Horse Came Out, a Fiery Red One" (Revelation 6:4) and "The Sea Gave Up the Dead" (Revelation 20:13). Their fighting skills are exceptional and they are Xavras' most trusted soldiers.

== Analysis ==
One of the author's inspirations was the First Chechen War; Xavras's guerrillas fighting against Soviet forces resemble Chechens battling with the Russian Army. The novel was analyzed in the context of the nuclear weapon motif in literature. Other threads of the work that received literary commentaries concern, among others, national and religious symbolism, the morality of terrorism and the role of the media in shaping public opinion. The novel has also been described as historiosophic, concerned with the great man theory. Piotr Przytuła wrote that Xavras Wyżryn is a story about how pop culture appropriates and transforms historical figures.

The main character of the novel, Xavras Wyżryn, is a character referring to Polish 19th-century romantic national liberation traditions, but at the same time, a terrorist using nuclear weapons, described as "the ayatollah of [...] Catholic jihad".

Critics debate whether the story is patriotic or antipatriotic. As in the Chechen conflict, neither side holds a moral high ground since both commit horrible war crimes to reach their goals. After the September 11 attacks in 2001, a story about terrorists calling themselves "freedom fighters" gained much more meaning, and the book's dialogues on morals, ethics and freedom become deeper than ever.
