= East Wing (Kazakhstan) =

Private airline based in Kazakhstan

IATA	ICAO	Call sign
—	EWZ	—
- Founded: 2006; 20 years ago
- Hubs: Almaty International Airport
- Fleet size: 2
- Headquarters: Almaty, Kazakhstan

East Wing is a private airline based in Almaty, Kazakhstan. The airline operates Yak-40 and Antonov-28 aircraft. The airline performs medical flights. Main customer "The republican center of sanitary aircraft" of the Ministry of Health of the Republic of Kazakhstan. Partners "The republican center of sanitary aircraft" of the Ministry of Health of the Republic of Kazakhstan.

== Fleet ==
=== Current fleet ===
As of July 2026, East Wing operates the following aircraft:

East Wing Fleet
Aircraft	In Service	Orders	Passengers	Notes
Antonov An-12B	1	—		
Embraer ERJ 135LR	1	—		
Total	2			

=== Former fleet ===
As of August 2025, East Wing operated 1 Antonov An-12 and 1 Embraer ERJ 135.

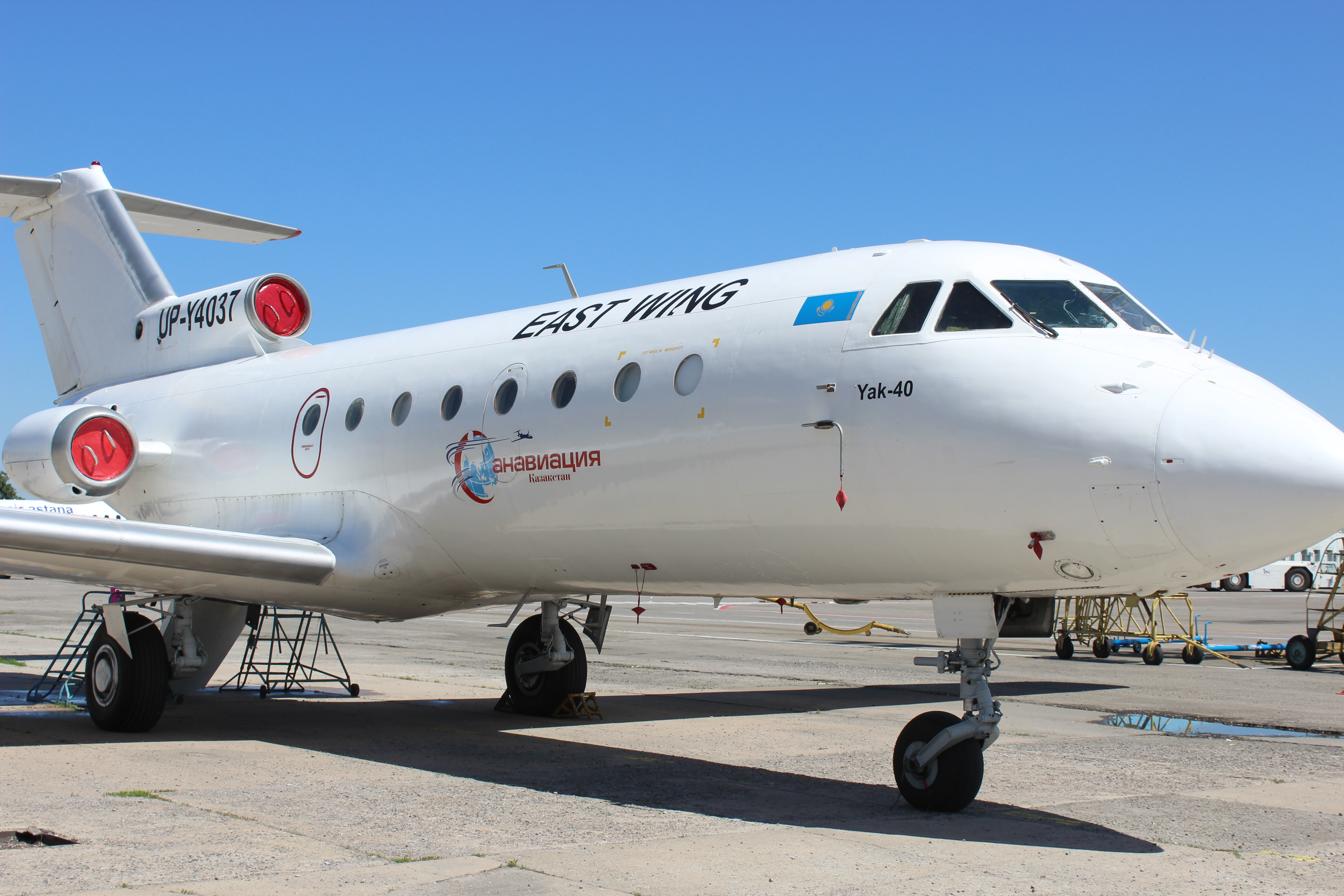
Yak-40 UP-Y4037

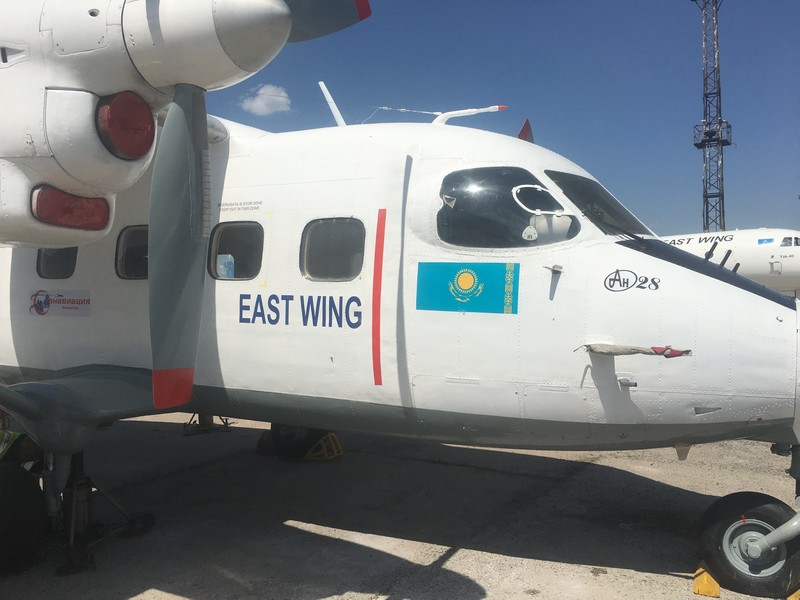
Antonov-28 UP-A2807

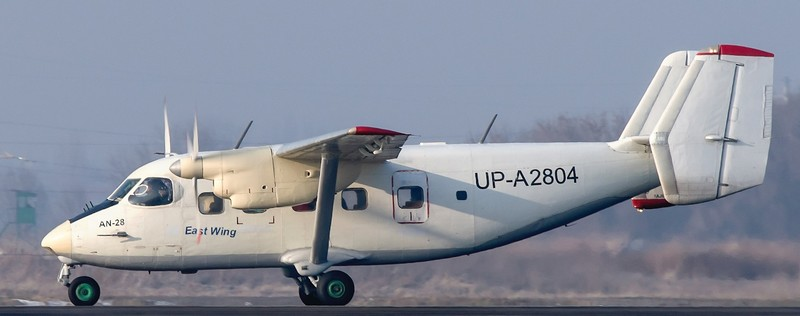
Antonov-28 UP-A2804
