= Gender neutrality in English =

Linguistic feature in the English language

Gender-neutral language is language that avoids assumptions about the social gender or biological sex of people referred to in speech or writing. In contrast to most other Indo-European languages, English does not retain grammatical gender and most of its nouns, adjectives and pronouns are therefore not gender-specific. In most other Indo-European languages, nouns are grammatically masculine (as in Spanish el humano) or grammatically feminine (as in French la personne), or grammatically neuter (as in German das Mädchen), regardless of the actual gender of the referent.

In addressing natural gender, English speakers use linguistic strategies that may reflect the speaker's attitude to the issue or the perceived social acceptability of such strategies.

== Debate ==
Supporters of gender-neutral language argue that making language less biased is not only laudable but also achievable. Some people find the use of non-neutral language to be offensive.

[There is] a growing awareness that language does not merely reflect the way we think: it also shapes our thinking. If words and expressions that imply that women are inferior to men are constantly used, that assumption of inferiority tends to become part of our mindset... Language is a powerful tool: poets and propagandists know this – as, indeed, do victims of discrimination.

The standards advocated by supporters of the gender-neutral modification in English have been applied differently and to differing degrees among English speakers worldwide. This reflects differences in culture and language structure, for example American English in contrast to British English.

=== Support for ===
Supporters of gender-neutral language argue that the use of gender-specific language often implies male superiority or reflects an unequal state of society. According to The Handbook of English Linguistics, generic masculine pronouns and gender-specific job titles are instances "where English linguistic convention has historically treated men as prototypical of the human species." That masculine forms are used to represent all human beings is in accord with the traditional gender hierarchy, which grants men more power and higher social status than women.

Supporters also argue that words that refer to women often devolve in meaning, frequently developing sexual overtones.

The Handbook of Nonsexist Writing says that the words children hear affect their perceptions of the gender-appropriateness of certain careers (e.g. firemen vs firefighters). Men and women apply for jobs in more equal proportions when gender-neutral language is used in the advertisement, as opposed to the generic he or man. Some critics claim that these differences in usage are not accidental, but have been deliberately created for the purpose of upholding a patriarchal society.

=== Opposition ===
Various criticisms have been leveled against the use of gender-neutral language, most focusing on specific usages, such as the use of "human" instead of "man" and "they" instead of "he". Opponents argue that the use of any other forms of language other than gender-specific language could "lead one into using awkward or grating constructions" or neologisms that are so ugly as to be "abominations".

Opponents of gender-neutral language often argue that its proponents are impinging on the right of free expression and promoting censorship, as well as being overly accommodating to the sensitivities of a minority. A few commentators do not disagree with the usage of gender-neutral language, but they do question the effectiveness of gender-neutral language in overcoming sexism.

=== In religion ===
Much debate over the use of gender-neutral language surrounds questions of liturgy and Bible translation. Some translations of the Bible in recent years have used gender-inclusive pronouns, but these translations have not been universally accepted.

=== Naming practices ===
Some critics oppose the practice of women changing their names upon marriage, on the grounds that it makes women historically invisible: "In our society 'only men have real names' in that their names are permanent and they have 'accepted the permanency of their names as one of the rights of being male.'... Essentially this practice means that women's family names do not count and that there is one more device for making women invisible." Up until the 1970s, as women were granted greater access to professions, they would be less likely to change their names, either professionally or legally; names were seen as tied to reputations and women were less likely to change their names when they had higher reputations. However, that trend was reversed starting in the 1970s; since that time, increasingly more women have been taking their husband's surname upon marriage, especially among well-educated women in high-earning occupations. Increasingly, studies have shown women's decisions on the issue are guided by factors other than political or religious ideas about women's rights or marital roles, as often believed.

The practice of referring to married women by their husband's first and last names, which only died out in the late 20th century, has been criticized since the 19th century. When the Reverend Samuel May "moved that Mrs Stephen Smith be placed on a Committee" of the National Women's Rights Convention in Seneca Falls, Lucretia Mott quickly replied: "Woman's Rights' women do not like to be called by their husbands' names, but by their own". Elizabeth Cady Stanton refused to be addressed as "Mrs Henry B. Stanton". The practice was developed in the mid-18th century and was tied to the idea of coverture, the idea that "By marriage, the husband and wife are one person in law; that is, the very being or legal existence of the woman is suspended during the marriage."

There is a tendency among scientists to refer to women by their first and last name and to men by their last name only. This may result in female scientists being perceived as less eminent than their male colleagues. This phenomenon is also present in the humanities, such as textbooks or program notes referring to male composers of Western classical music by only their last name, while using full names for female composers.

== Examples of gender-neutral language ==
=== Job titles ===
Gender-neutral job titles do not specify the gender of the person referred to, particularly when the gender is not in fact known, or is not yet specified (as in job advertisements). Examples include firefighter instead of fireman; flight attendant instead of steward or stewardess; bartender instead of barman or barmaid; and chairperson or chair instead of chairman or chairwoman.

There are also cases where a distinct female form exists, but the basic (or "male") form does not intrinsically indicate a male (such as by including man), and can equally well be applied to any member of the profession, whether male or female or of unspecified sex. Examples include actor and actress; usher and usherette; comedian and comedienne. In such cases, proponents of gender-neutral language generally advocate the non-use of the distinct female form (always using comedian rather than comedienne, for example, even if the referent is known to be a woman).

Terms such as male nurse, male model or female judge are sometimes used in cases where the gender is irrelevant or already understood (as in "my brother is a male nurse"). Many advisors on non-sexist usage discourage such phrasing, as it implies that someone of that gender is an inferior or atypical member of the profession. Another discouraged form is the prefixing of an ordinary job title with lady, as in lady doctor: here woman or female is preferred if it is necessary to specify the gender. Some jobs are known colloquially with a gender marker: washerwoman or laundress (now usually referred to as a laundry worker), tea lady (formerly in offices, still in hospitals), lunch lady (American English) or dinner lady (British English), cleaning lady for cleaner (formerly known as a charwoman or charlady), and so on.

=== Generic words for humans ===
Another issue for gender-neutral language concerns the use of the words man, men and mankind to refer to a person or people of unspecified sex or to persons of both sexes.

Although the word man originally referred to both males and females, some feel that it no longer does so unambiguously. In Old English, the word wer referred to males only and wif to females only, while man referred to both, although in practice man was sometimes also used in Old English to refer only to males. In time, wer fell out of use, and man came to refer sometimes to both sexes and sometimes to males only; "[a]s long as most generalizations about men were made by men about men, the ambiguity nestling in this dual usage was either not noticed or thought not to matter." By the 18th century, man had come to refer primarily to males; some writers who wished to use the term in the older sense deemed it necessary to spell out their meaning. Anthony Trollope, for example, writes of "the infinite simplicity and silliness of mankind and womankind", and when "Edmund Burke, writing of the French Revolution, used men in the old, inclusive way, he took pains to spell out his meaning: 'Such a deplorable havoc is made in the minds of men (both sexes) in France....'"

Proponents of gender-neutral language argue that seemingly generic uses of the word "man" are often not in fact generic. Miller and Swift illustrate with the following quotation:

As for man, he is no different from the rest. His back aches, he ruptures easily, his women have difficulties in childbirth....

"If man and he were truly generic, the parallel phrase would have been he has difficulties in childbirth", Miller and Swift comment. Writing for the American Philosophical Association, Virginia L. Warren follows Janice Moulton and suggests truly generic uses of the word man would be perceived as "false, funny, or insulting", offering as an example the sentence "Some men are female."

Further, some commentators point out that the ostensibly gender-neutral use of man has in fact sometimes been used to exclude women:

Thomas Jefferson did not make the same distinction in declaring that "all men are created equal" and "governments are instituted among men, deriving their just powers from the consent of the governed." In a time when women, having no vote, could neither give nor withhold consent, Jefferson had to be using the word men in its principal sense of males, and it probably never occurred to him that anyone would think otherwise.

For reasons like those above, supporters of gender-neutral language argue that linguistic clarity as well as equality would be better served by having man and men refer unambiguously to males, and human(s) or people to all persons; similarly, the word mankind replaced by humankind or humanity.

The use of the word man as a generic word referring to all humans has been declining, particularly among female speakers and writers.

=== Pronouns ===
Another target of frequent criticism by proponents of gender-neutral language is the use of the masculine pronoun he (and its derived forms him, his and himself) to refer to antecedents of indeterminate gender. Although this usage is traditional, some critics argue that it was invented and propagated by males, whose explicit goal was the linguistic representation of male superiority. The use of the generic he was approved in an Act of Parliament, the Interpretation Act 1850 (the provision continues in the Interpretation Act 1978, although this states equally that the feminine includes the masculine). On the other hand, in 1879 the word "he" in by-laws was used to block admission of women to the Massachusetts Medical Society.

Proposed alternatives to the generic he include he or she (or she or he), s/he, or the use of singular they. Each of these alternatives has met with objections. The use of he or she has been criticized for reinforcing the gender binary. Some see the use of singular they to be a grammatical error, but according to most references, they, their and them have long been grammatically acceptable as gender-neutral singular pronouns in English, having been used in the singular continuously since the Middle Ages, including by a number of prominent authors, such as Geoffrey Chaucer, William Shakespeare, and Jane Austen. Linguist Steven Pinker goes further and argues that traditional grammar proscriptions regarding the use of singular "they" are themselves incorrect:

The logical point that you, Holden Caulfield, and everyone but the language mavens intuitively grasp is that everyone and they are not an "antecedent" and a "pronoun" referring to the same person in the world, which would force them to agree in number. They are a "quantifier" and a "bound variable", a different logical relationship. Everyone returned to their seats means "For all X, X returned to X's seat." The "X" does not refer to any particular person or group of people; it is simply a placeholder that keeps track of the roles that players play across different relationships. In this case, the X that comes back to a seat is the same X that owns the seat that X comes back to. The their there does not, in fact, have plural number, because it refers neither to one thing nor to many things; it does not refer at all.

Some style guides (e.g. APA) accept singular they as grammatically correct, while others reject it. Some, such as The Chicago Manual of Style (CMOS), once held (in 2003) a neutral position on the issue, contending that any approach used was likely to displease some readers. CMOS later recognized use of singular they in the 17th edition of CMOS (2017), and in the 18th edition (2024) specifically endorses it.

Research has found that the use of masculine pronouns in a generic sense creates "male bias" by evoking a disproportionate number of male images and excluding thoughts of women in non-sex specific instances. Moreover, a study by John Gastil found that while they functions as a generic pronoun for both males and females, males may comprehend he/she in a manner similar to he.

=== Honorifics ===
Proponents of gender-neutral language point out that while Mr is used for men regardless of marital status, the titles Miss and Mrs indicate a woman's marital status, and thus signal her legal relationship to a man. The honorific "Ms" can be used for women regardless of marital status.

The gender-neutral honorific Mx (usually /ˈmɪks/ "mix", /ˈmʌks/ MUKS) can be used in place of gendered honorifics to provide gender neutrality. In 2013, Brighton and Hove City Council in Sussex, England, voted to allow its use on council forms, and in 2014, The Royal Bank of Scotland included the title as an option. In 2015, recognition spread more broadly across UK institutions, including the Royal Mail, government agencies responsible for documents such as drivers' licenses, and several other major banks. In 2015, it was included in the Oxford English Dictionary.

== Style guidance by publishers and others ==
Many editing houses, corporations, and government bodies have official policies in favor of in-house use of gender-neutral language. One of the first was The Handbook of Nonsexist Writing: For writers, editors, and speakers, published in 1980; linguist Deborah Cameron argues that the work by Casey Miller and Kate Swift brought "the issue of sexist language into the mainstream".

In some cases, laws exist regarding the use of gender-neutral language in certain situations, such as job advertisements. Different authorities have presented guidelines on whether and how to use gender-neutral, or "non-sexist" language. Several are listed below:

- The "Publication Manual " of the American Psychological Association has an oft-cited section on "Guidelines to Reduce Bias in Language". ISBN 1-55798-791-2
- American Philosophical Association —published 1986
- The Guardian—see section "gender issues"
- Avoiding Heterosexual Bias in Language, published by the Committee on Lesbian and Gay Concerns, American Psychological Association.

In addition, gender-neutral language has gained support from some major textbook publishers, and from professional and academic groups such as the American Psychological Association and the Associated Press. Newspapers such as the New York Times and the Wall Street Journal use gender-neutral language. Many law journals, psychology journals, and literature journals will only print articles or papers that use gender-inclusive language.

Employee policy manuals sometimes include statements prescribing avoidance of language that could be considered discriminatory. One such example is from the University of Saskatchewan: "All documents, publications or presentations developed by all constituencies...shall be written in gender neutral and/or gender inclusive language."

In 1989 the American Bar Association's House of Delegates adopted a resolution stating that "the American Bar Association and each of its entities should use gender-neutral language in all documents establishing policy and procedure."

In 2015 the Union for Reform Judaism in North America passed a "Resolution on the Rights of Transgender and Gender Non-Conforming People" stating in part: "THEREFORE, BE IT RESOLVED THAT the Union for Reform Judaism...[u]rges Reform Movement institutions to review their use of language in prayers, forms and policies in an effort to ensure people of all gender identities and gender expressions are welcomed, included, accepted and respected. This includes developing statements of inclusion and/or non-discrimination policies pertaining to gender identity and gender expression, the use when feasible of gender-neutral language, and offering more than two gender options or eliminating the need to select a gender on forms".

== See also ==
- Epicene
- Gender in English
- Gender role
- Gender neutrality in languages with grammatical gender
- Gender neutrality in genderless languages
- Gender marking in job titles
- Generic antecedent
- Markedness
- Unisex name
- You § Plural forms from other varieties
