= Singular they =

Gender-neutral English pronoun

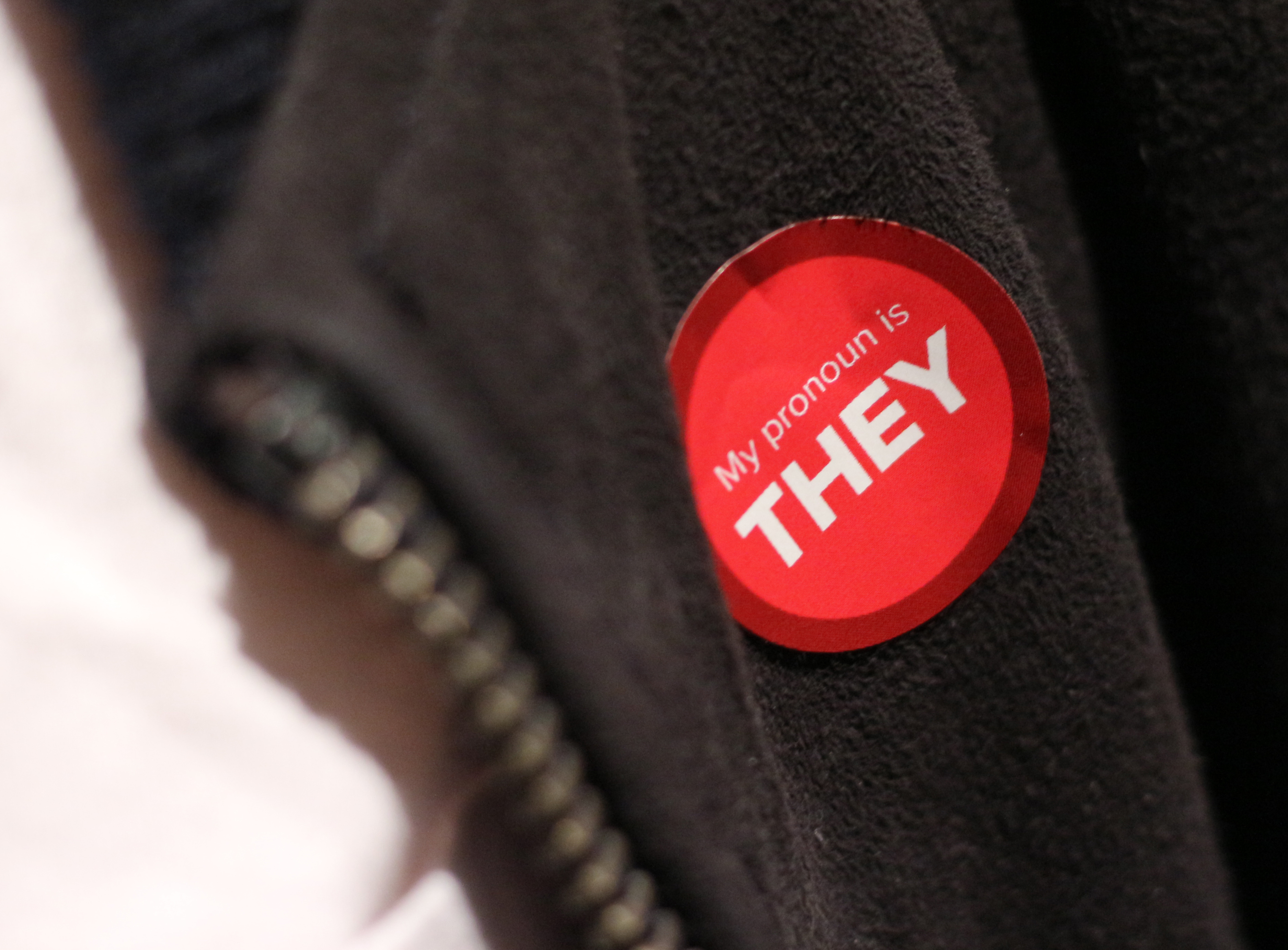
Sticker indicating the preference of the usage of singular they on the wearer

Singular they is an epicene (gender-neutral) third-person pronoun in English. It typically occurs with an indeterminate antecedent, to refer to an unknown person, or to refer to every person of some group, in sentences such as:

"Somebody left their umbrella in the office. Could you please let them know where they can get it?"
"My personal rule is to never trust anyone who says that they had a good time in high school."
"The patient should be told at the outset how much they will be required to pay."
"But a journalist should not be forced to reveal their sources."
"Everybody can make good pastry if they have the 'know-how'."

This use of singular they had emerged by the 14th century, about a century after the plural they. Singular they has been criticized since the mid-18th century by prescriptive commentators who consider it an error. Its continued use in modern standard English has become more common and formally accepted with the move toward gender-neutral language. Some early-21st-century style guides described it as colloquial and less appropriate in formal writing. However, by 2020, most style guides and English-learning websites, such as the APA, AP, CMOS, British Council etc. accepted the singular they as a personal pronoun.

In the early 21st century, use of singular they with known individuals emerged for non-binary people, as in, for example, "This is my friend, Jay. I met them at work." They in this context was named Word of the Year for 2015 by the American Dialect Society, and for 2019 by Merriam-Webster. In 2020, the American Dialect Society also selected it as Word of the Decade for the 2010s.

== Inflected forms and derivative pronouns ==
Like the "singular you", "singular they" permits a singular antecedent, but is used with the same verb forms as plural they, and has the same inflected forms as plural they (i.e. them, their, and theirs), except that in the reflexive form, themself is sometimes used instead of themselves.

Inflected forms of third-person personal pronouns
Pronoun	Subjective (nominative)	Objective (accusative)	Prenominal possessive (dependent genitive)	Predicative possessive (independent genitive)	Reflexive
He	He is my son.	When my son cries, I hug him.	My son tells me his age.	If I lose my phone, my son lends me his.	My son dresses himself.
She	She is my daughter.	When my daughter cries, I hug her.	My daughter tells me her age.	If I lose my phone, my daughter lends me hers.	My daughter dresses herself.
Plural they	They are my children.	When my children cry, I hug them.	My children tell me their ages.	If I lose my phone, my children lend me theirs.	My children dress themselves.
Singular they	They are my child.	When my child cries, I hug them.	My child tells me their age.	If I lose my phone, my child lends me theirs.	My child dresses themself [or themselves].
Generic he	He is my child.	When my child cries, I hug him.	My child tells me his age.	If I lose my phone, my child lends me his.	My child dresses himself.
It	It is my child.	When my child cries, I hug it.	My child tells me its age.	If I lose my phone, my child lends me its.	My child dresses itself.

Themself is attested from the 14th to 16th centuries. Its use has been increasing since the 1970s or 1980s, though it is sometimes still classified as "a minority form". In 2002, Payne and Huddleston, in The Cambridge Grammar of the English Language, called its use in standard dialect "rare and acceptable only to a minority of speakers" but "likely to increase with the growing acceptance of they as a singular pronoun". It is useful when referring to a single person of indeterminate gender, where the plural form themselves might seem incongruous, as in:

"It is not an actor pretending to be Reagan or Thatcher, it is, in grotesque form, the person themself."

— Ian Hislop (1984), Fowler's

=== Regional preferences ===
The Canadian government recommends themselves as the reflexive form of singular they for use in Canadian federal legislative texts and advises against using themself.

== Usage ==
They with a singular antecedent goes back to the Middle English of the 14th century (slightly younger than they with a plural antecedent, which was borrowed from Old Norse in the 13th century), and has remained in use for centuries in spite of its proscription by traditional grammarians beginning in the mid-18th century.

Informal spoken English exhibits universal use of the singular they. An examination by Jürgen Gerner of the British National Corpus published in 1998 found that British speakers, regardless of social status, age, sex, or region, used the singular they more often than the gender-neutral he or other options in the context of being anaphors after indefinite pronouns like "everybody" and "anybody".

=== Prescription of generic he ===
He has been used with antecedents of indeterminate gender since the Old English period, as in the following:

"If any one did not know it, it was his own fault."

— George Washington Cable, Old Creole Days (1879); quoted by Baskervill & Sewell.

"Every person who turns this page has his own little diary."

— W. M. Thackeray, On Lett's Diary (1869); Baskervill & Sewell, An English Grammar.

The earliest known explicit recommendation by a grammarian to use the generic he rather than they in formal English is Ann Fisher's mid-18th century A New Grammar assertion that "The Masculine Person answers to the general Name, which comprehends both Male and Female; as, any Person who knows what he says." (Ann Fisher as quoted by Ostade)

Nineteenth-century grammarians insisted on he as a gender-neutral pronoun on the grounds of number agreement, while rejecting "he or she" as clumsy, and this was widely adopted: e.g. in 1850, the British Parliament passed an act which provided that, when used in acts of Parliament "words importing the masculine gender shall be deemed and taken to include females". Baskervill and Sewell mention the common use of the singular they in their An English Grammar for the Use of High School, Academy and College Class of 1895, but prefer the generic he on the basis of number agreement.

Baskervill gives a number of examples of recognized authors using the singular they, including:

"Every one must judge according to their own feelings."

— Lord Byron, Werner (1823), quoted as "Every one must judge of [sic] their own feelings."

"Had the Doctor been contented to take my dining tables as any body in their senses would have done ..."

— Jane Austen, Mansfield Park (1814);

It has been argued that the real motivation for promoting the "generic" he was an androcentric world view, with the default sex of humans being male – and the default gender therefore being masculine. There is some evidence for this: Wilson wrote in 1560:

"... let us keepe a naturall order, and set the man before the woman for manners sake."

— Wilson, The arte of Rhetorique (1560);

"... the worthier is preferred and set before. As a man is set before a woman ..."

— Wilson, The arte of Rhetorique (1560);

And Poole wrote in 1646:

"The Masculine gender is more worthy than the Feminine."

— Poole, The English Accidence (1646); cited by Bodine

In spite of continuous attempts on the part of educationalists to proscribe singular they in favour of he, this advice was ignored; even writers of the period continued to use they (though the proscription may have been observed more by American writers). Use of the purportedly gender-neutral he remained acceptable until at least the 1960s, though some uses of he were later criticized as being awkward or silly, for instance when referring to:

- Indeterminate persons of both sexes:

"The ideal that every boy and girl should be so equipped that he shall not be handicapped in his struggle for social progress ..." [emphasis added]

— C. C. Fries, American English Grammar, (1940).

- Known persons of both sexes:

"She and Louis had a game – who could find the ugliest photograph of himself."

— Joseph P. Lash, Eleanor and Franklin (1971)

=== Contemporary use of he to refer to a generic or indefinite antecedent ===
He is still sometimes found in contemporary writing when referring to a generic or indeterminate antecedent. In some cases, it is clear from the situation that the persons potentially referred to are likely to be male, as in:

"The patient should be informed of his therapeutic options."

— A text about prostate cancer (2004)

In some cases the antecedent may refer to persons who are only probably male or to occupations traditionally thought of as male:

"It wouldn't be as if the lone astronaut would be completely by himself." (2008)

"Kitchen table issues ... are ones the next president can actually do something about if he actually cares about it. More likely if she cares about it!"

— Hillary Clinton (2008)

In other situations, the antecedent may refer to an indeterminate person of either sex:

"Now, a writer is entitled to have a Roget on his desk."

— Barzun (1985), quoted in Merriam-Webster's Concise Dictionary of English Usage

"A Member of Parliament should always live in his constituency."

In 2010, Choy and Clark still recommended the use of generic he "in formal speech or writing":

"... when indefinite pronouns are used as antecedents, they require singular subject, object, and possessive pronouns ..."
"Everyone did as he pleased"

— Choy, Basic Grammar and Usage

In informal spoken English, plural pronouns are often used with indefinite pronoun antecedents

Informal: Somebody should let you borrow their book.
Formal: Somebody should let you borrow his book.

— Choy, Basic Grammar and Usage

In 2015, Fowler's Dictionary of Modern English Usage calls this "the now outmoded use of he to mean 'anyone'", stating:

From the earliest times until about the 1960s it was unquestionably acceptable to use the pronoun he (and him, himself, his) with indefinite reference to denote a person of either sex, especially after indefinite pronouns and determiners such as anybody, ... every, etc., after gender-neutral nouns such as person ... [but] alternative devices are now usually resorted to. When a gender-neutral pronoun or determiner ... is needed, the options usually adopted are the plural forms they, their, themselves, etc., or he or she (his or her, etc.)

In 2016, Garner's Modern English Usage calls the generic use of masculine pronouns "the traditional view, now widely assailed as sexist".

=== Rise of gender-neutral language ===
The earliest known attempt to create a new gender-neutral pronoun in English dates back to 1792, when Scottish economist James Anderson of Hermiston advocated for an indeterminate pronoun ou.

In 1808, poet Samuel Taylor Coleridge suggested it and which as neutral pronouns for the word person.

In the second half of the 20th century, people expressed more widespread concern at the use of male-oriented language. This included criticism of the use of man as a generic term to include men and women and of the use of he to refer to any human, regardless of sex (social gender).

It was argued that he could not sensibly be used as a generic pronoun understood to include men and women. William Safire in his On Language column in The New York Times approved of the use of generic he, mentioning the mnemonic phrase "the male embraces the female". C. Badendyck from Brooklyn wrote to The New York Times in a reply:

The average American needs the small routines of getting ready for work. As he shaves or blow-dries his hair or pulls on his panty-hose, he is easing himself by small stages into the demands of the day.

By 1980, the movement toward gender-neutral language had gained wide support, and many organizations, including most publishers, had issued guidelines on the use of gender-neutral language, but stopped short of recommending they to be third-person singular with a non-indeterminate, singular antecedent.

=== Contemporary usage ===
The use of masculine generic nouns and pronouns in written and spoken language has decreased since the 1970s. In a corpus of spontaneous speech collected in Australia in the 1990s, singular they had become the most frequently used generic pronoun (rather than generic he or he or she). Similarly, a study from 2002 looking at a corpus of American and British newspapers showed a preference for they to be used as a singular epicene pronoun.

The increased use of singular they may owe in part to an increasing desire for gender-neutral language. A solution in formal writing has often been to write "he or she", or something similar, but this is often considered awkward or overly politically correct, particularly when used excessively. In 2016, the journal American Speech published a study by Darren K. LaScotte investigating the pronouns used by native English speakers in informal written responses to questions concerning a subject of unspecified gender, finding that 68% of study participants chose singular they to refer to such an antecedent. Some participants noted that they found constructions such as "he or she" inadequate as they do not include people who identify as neither male nor female.

==== Use with a pronoun antecedent ====
The singular antecedent can be a pronoun such as someone, anybody, or everybody, or an interrogative pronoun such as who:

- With somebody or someone:

"I feel that if someone is not doing their job it should be called to their attention."

— an American newspaper (1984); quoted by Fowler.

- With anybody or anyone:

"If anyone tells you that America's best days are behind her, then they're looking the wrong way." President George H. W. Bush, 1991 State of the Union Address; quoted by Garner

"Anyone can set themselves up as an acupuncturist."

— Sarah Lonsdale, "Sharp Practice Pricks Reputation of Acupuncture". The Observer 15 December 1991, as cited by Garner

"If anybody calls, take their name and ask them to call again later." Example given by Swan

"It will be illegal for anyone to donate an organ to their wife, husband, adopted child, adopted parent or close friend." (Note: Article accessible for free using a library card number from many public libraries)
- With nobody or no one:

"No one put their hand up." Example given by Huddleston et al.

"No one felt they had been misled." Example given by Huddleston et al.

- With an interrogative pronoun as antecedent:

"Who thinks they can solve the problem?". Example given by Huddleston et al.; The Cambridge Grammar of the English Language.

- With everybody, everyone, etc.:

"Everyone promised to behave themselves." Example given by Huddleston et al.

===== Notional plurality or pairwise relationships =====
Although the pronouns everybody, everyone, nobody, and no one are singular in form and are used with a singular verb, these pronouns have an "implied plurality" that is somewhat similar to the implied plurality of collective or group nouns such as crowd or team, (Note: Especially in British English, such collective nouns can be followed by a plural verb and a plural pronoun; in American English such collective nouns are more usually followed by a singular verb and a singular pronoun.) and in some sentences where the antecedent is one of these "implied plural" pronouns, the word they cannot be replaced by generic he, suggesting a "notional plural" rather than a "bound variable" interpretation. This is in contrast to sentences that involve multiple pairwise relationships and singular they, such as:

"Everyone loves their mother."
"'I never did get into that football thing', she said after everyone returned to their seat."
"Everyone doubts themselves/themself at one time or another."

There are examples where the antecedent pronoun (such as everyone) may refer to a collective, with no necessary implication of pairwise relationships. These are examples of plural they:

"At first everyone in the room was singing; then they began to laugh." Example given by Kolln.
"Everybody was crouched behind the furniture to surprise me, and they tried to. But I already knew they were there." Example given by Garner.
"Nobody was late, were they?" Example given by Swan.

Which are apparent because they do not work with a generic he or he or she:

"At first everyone in the room was singing; then he or she began to laugh." Example given by Kolln.
"Everybody was crouched behind the furniture to surprise me, and he tried to. But I already knew he was there."
"Nobody was late, was he?"

In addition, for these "notional plural" cases, it would not be appropriate to use themself instead of themselves as in:

"Everybody was crouched behind the furniture to surprise me, but they instead surprised themself."

==== Use with a generic noun as antecedent ====
The singular antecedent can also be a noun such as person, patient, or student:

- With a noun (e.g. person, student, patient) used generically (e.g. in the sense of any member of that class or a specific member unknown to the speaker or writer)

"cognitive dissonance: "a concept in psychology [that] describes the condition in which a person's attitudes conflict with their behaviour".

— Macmillan Dictionary of Business and Management (1988), as cited by Garner.

"A starting point would be to give more support to the company secretary. They are, or should be, privy to the confidential deliberations and secrets of the board and the company.

— Ronald Severn, "Protecting the Secretary Bird". Financial Times, 6 January 1992; quoted by Garner.

- With representatives of a class previously referred to in the singular
"I had to decide: Is this person being irrational or is he right? Of course, they were often right."

Even when referring to a class of persons of known sex, they is sometimes used:

"I swear more when I'm talking to a boy, because I'm not afraid of shocking them". From an interview.
"No mother should be forced to testify against their child".

They may also be used with antecedents of mixed genders:

"Let me know if your father or your mother changes their mind." Example given by Huddleston et al.
"Either the husband or the wife has perjured themself." Here themself might be acceptable to some, themselves seems less acceptable, and himself is unacceptable. Example given by Huddleston et al.

Even for a definite known person of known sex, they may be used in order to ignore or conceal the sex.

"I had a friend in Paris, and they had to go to hospital for a month." (definite person, not identified)

The word themself is also sometimes used when the antecedent is known or believed to be a single person.

"Someone has apparently locked themself in the office."[acceptability questionable]

==== Use for specific, known people, including non-binary people ====
Known individuals may be referred to as they if the individual's gender is unknown to the speaker.

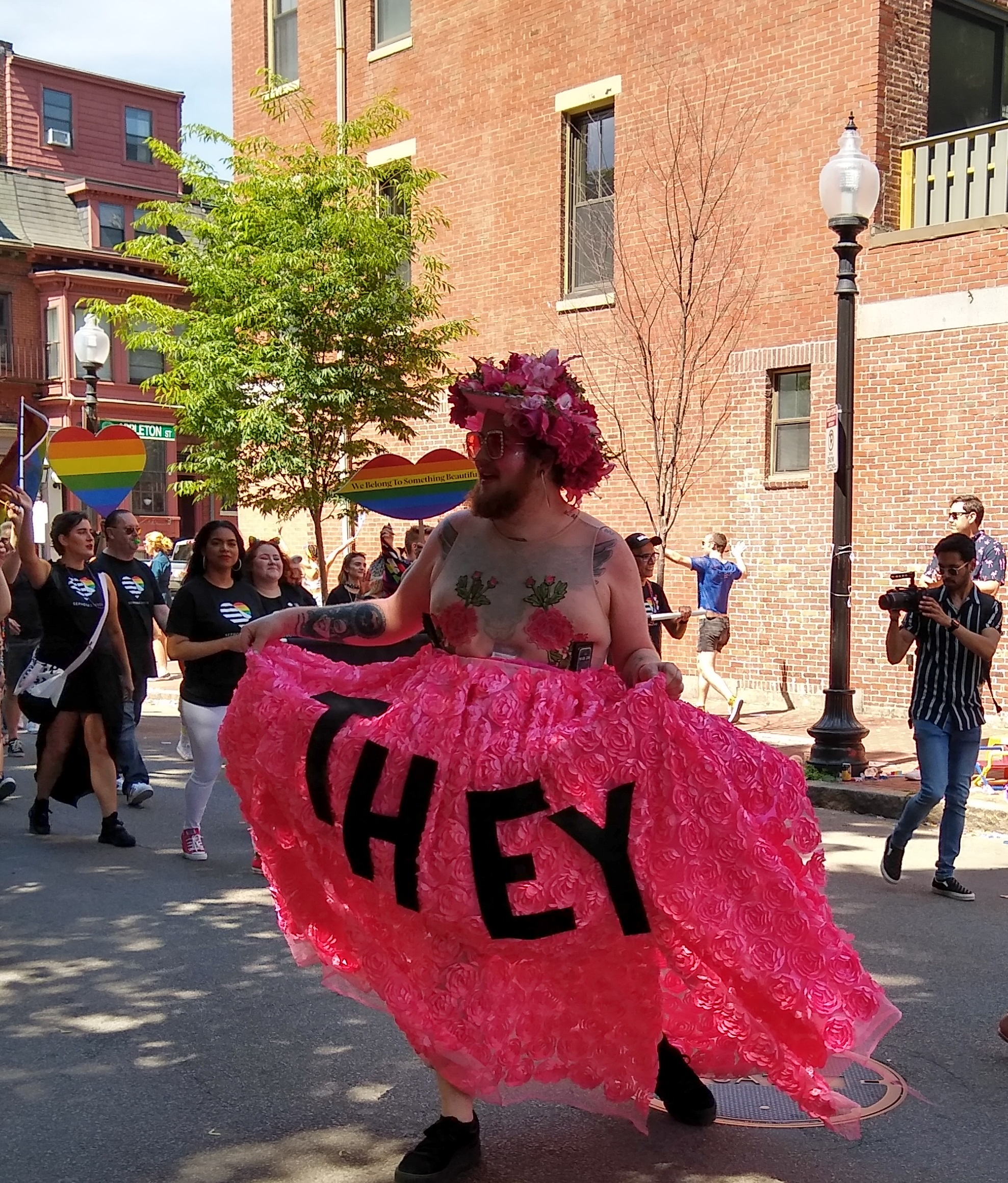
Person advocating for the usage of the singular they for genderqueer people in the Boston Pride Parade, 2019

A known individual may also be referred to as they if the individual is non-binary or genderqueer and considers they and derivatives as appropriate pronouns. Several social media applications permit account holders to choose to identify their gender using one of a variety of non-binary or genderqueer options, such as non-binary, genderfluid, agender, or bigender, and to designate pronouns, including they/them, which they wish to be used when referring to them. Explicitly designating one's pronouns as they/them increases the chance that people will interpret "they" as singular. Though "singular they" has long been used with antecedents such as everybody or generic persons of unknown gender, this use, which may be chosen by an individual, is recent. The earliest recorded usage of this sense documented by the Oxford English Dictionary is in a tweet from 2009; the journal American Speech documents an example from 2008 in an article in the journal Women's Studies Quarterly. As of 2020, singular they is the most popular pronoun set used by non-binary people. Approximately 80% consider it appropriate for themselves.

The singular they in the meaning "gender-neutral singular pronoun for a known person, as a non-binary identifier" was chosen by the American Dialect Society as their "Word of the Year" for 2015. In 2016, the American Dialect Society wrote:

"While editors have increasingly moved to accepting singular they when used in a generic fashion, voters in the Word of the Year proceedings singled out its newer usage as an identifier for someone who may identify as non-binary in gender terms."

The vote followed the previous year's approval of this use by The Washington Post style guide, when Bill Walsh, the Post's copy editor, said that the singular they is "the only sensible solution to English's lack of a gender-neutral third-person singular personal pronoun".

In 2019, the non-binary they was added to Merriam-Webster's dictionary and was named as that year's Word of the Year. On January 4, 2020, the American Dialect Society announced they had crowned they, again in this context, Word of the Decade for the 2010s.

The first non-binary main character on North American television appeared on the Showtime drama series Billions in 2017, with Asia Kate Dillon playing Taylor Mason. Both actor and character use singular they.

== Acceptability and prescriptive guidance ==
Though both generic he and generic they have long histories of use, and both are still used, both are also systematically avoided by particular groups.

Style guides that avoid expressing a preference for either approach sometimes recommend recasting a problem sentence, for instance replacing generic expressions with plurals to avoid the criticisms of either party.

Sources differ about whether singular they is more accepted in British or American English, with Garner's Modern English Usage stating British English and A Comprehensive Grammar of the English Language stating American English.

=== Usage guidance in American style guides ===
==== Garner's Modern American Usage ====
Garner's Modern American Usage (4th ed., 2016) recommends cautious use of singular they, and avoidance where possible because its use is stigmatized.

"Where noun–pronoun disagreement can be avoided, avoid it. Where it can't be avoided, resort to it cautiously because some people may doubt your literacy".

Garner suggests that use of singular they is more acceptable in British English:

"Speakers of AmE resist this development more than speakers of BrE, in which the indeterminate they is already more or less standard."

and apparently regrets the resistance by the American language community:

"That it sets many literate Americans' teeth on edge is an unfortunate obstacle to what promises to be the ultimate solution to the problem."

He regards the trend toward using singular they with antecedents like everybody, anyone and somebody as inevitable:

"Disturbing though these developments may be to purists, they're irreversible. And nothing that a grammarian says will change them."

Garner also notes that "resistance to the singular they is fast receding" in all national varieties of English.

==== The Chicago Manual of Style ====
In the 14th edition (1993) of The Chicago Manual of Style, the University of Chicago Press explicitly recommended using singular they and their, noting a "revival" of this usage and citing "its venerable use by such writers as Addison, Austen, Chesterfield, Fielding, Ruskin, Scott, and Shakespeare." From the 15th edition (2003), this was changed. In Chapter 5 of the 17th edition (2017), now written by Bryan A. Garner, the recommendations were:

Normally, a singular antecedent requires a singular pronoun. But because he is no longer universally accepted as a generic pronoun referring to a person of unspecified gender, people commonly (in speech and in informal writing) substitute the third-person-plural pronouns they, them, their, and themselves (or the nonstandard singular themself). While this usage is accepted in those spheres, it is only lately showing signs of gaining acceptance in formal writing, where Chicago recommends avoiding its use. When referring specifically to a person who does not identify with a gender-specific pronoun, however, they and its forms are often preferred.

However, this was revised in the 18th edition (2024):

Traditionally, a singular antecedent requires a singular pronoun. But even before the movement away from he, him, his, and himself as generic pronouns referring to a person of unspecified gender, people had long substituted the third-person-plural pronouns they, them, their, and themselves (or possibly themself) as generic singular forms—especially in speech and informal prose {somebody forgot their coat}. In recent years this usage has become accepted in more formal contexts, and Chicago now endorses it.

==== Publication Manual of the American Psychological Association ====
The 7th edition of the American Psychological Association's Publication Manual, released in October 2019, advises using singular "they" when gender is unknown or irrelevant, and gives the following example:

For instance, rather than writing "I don't know who wrote this note, but he or she has good handwriting," you might write something like "I don't know who wrote this note, but they have good handwriting."

APA style also endorses using they/them if it is someone's (for example, a non-binary person's) preferred pronoun set.

==== Strunk & White's The Elements of Style ====
William Strunk Jr. & E. B. White, the original authors of The Elements of Style, found use of they with a singular antecedent unacceptable and advised use of the singular pronoun (he). In the 3rd edition (1979), the recommendation was still:

They. Not to be used when the antecedent is a distributive expression, such as each, each one. everybody, every one, many a man. Use the singular pronoun. ... A similar fault is the use of the plural pronoun with the antecedent anybody, anyone, somebody, someone ....

The assessment, in 1979, was that:

The use of he as pronoun for nouns embracing both genders is a simple, practical convention rooted in the beginnings of the English language. He has lost all suggestion of maleness in these circumstances. ... It has no pejorative connotation; it is never incorrect.

In the 4th edition (2000), use of singular they was still proscribed against, but use of generic he was no longer recommended.

==== Joseph M. Williams's The Basics of Clarity and Grace (2009) ====
Joseph M. Williams, who wrote a number of books on writing with "clarity and grace", discusses the advantages and disadvantages of various solutions when faced with the problem of referring to an antecedent such as someone, everyone, no one or a noun that does not indicate gender and suggests that this will continue to be a problem for some time. He "suspect[s] that eventually we will accept the plural they as a correct singular" but states that currently "formal usage requires a singular pronoun".

==== Purdue Online Writing Lab ====
The Purdue Online Writing Lab (OWL) states that "grammar shifts and changes over time", that the use of singular they is acceptable, and that singular "they" as a replacement for "he" or "she" is more inclusive:

When individuals whose gender is neither male nor female (e.g. nonbinary, agender, genderfluid, etc.) use the singular they to refer to themselves, they are using the language to express their identities. Adopting this language is one way writers can be inclusive of a range of people and identities.

— Purdue Writing Lab

==== The Washington Post ====
The Washington Post's stylebook, as of 2015, recommends trying to "write around the problem, perhaps by changing singulars to plurals, before using the singular they as a last resort" and specifically permits use of they for a "gender-nonconforming person".

==== Associated Press Stylebook ====
The Associated Press Stylebook, as of 2017, recommends: "they/them/their is acceptable in limited cases as a singular and-or gender-neutral pronoun, when alternative wording is overly awkward or clumsy. However, rewording usually is possible and always is preferable."

==== The Handbook of Nonsexist Writing ====
In The Handbook of Nonsexist Writing, Casey Miller and Kate Swift accept or recommend singular uses of they in cases where there is an element of semantic plurality expressed by a word such as "everyone" or where an indeterminate person is referred to, citing examples of such usage in formal speech. They also suggest rewriting sentences to use a plural they, eliminating pronouns, or recasting sentences to use "one" or (for babies) "it".

=== Usage guidance in British style guides ===
In the first edition of A Dictionary of Modern English Usage (published in 1926) use of the generic he is recommended. It is stated that singular they is disapproved of by grammarians. Numerous examples of its use by eminent writers in the past are given, but it is stated that "few good modern writers would flout [grammarians] so conspicuously as Fielding and Thackeray", whose sentences are described as having an "old-fashioned sound".

The second edition, Fowler's Modern English Usage (edited by Sir Ernest Gowers and published in 1965) continues to recommend use of the generic he; use of the singular they is called "the popular solution", which "sets the literary man's teeth on edge". It is stated that singular they is still disapproved of by grammarians but common in colloquial speech.

According to the third edition, The New Fowler's Modern English Usage (edited by Robert Burchfield and published in 1996) singular they has not only been widely used by good writers for centuries, but is now generally accepted, except by some conservative grammarians, including the Fowler of 1926, who, it is argued, ignored the evidence:

Over the centuries, writers of standing have used they, their, and them with anaphoric reference to a singular noun or pronoun, and the practice has continued in the 20C. to the point that, traditional grammarians aside, such constructions are hardly noticed any more or are not widely felt to lie in a prohibited zone. Fowler (1926) disliked the practice ... and gave a number of unattributed "faulty' examples ... The evidence presented in the OED points in another direction altogether.

The Complete Plain Words was originally written in 1948 by Ernest Gowers, a civil servant, in an attempt by the British civil service to improve "official English". A second edition, edited by Sir Bruce Fraser, was published in 1973. It refers to they or them as the "equivalent of a singular pronoun of common sex" as "common in speech and not unknown in serious writing " but "stigmatized by grammarians as usage grammatically indefensible. The book's advice for "official writers" (civil servants) is to avoid its use and not to be tempted by its "greater convenience", though "necessity may eventually force it into the category of accepted idiom".

A new edition of Plain Words, revised and updated by Gowers's great-granddaughter, Rebecca Gowers, was published in 2014. It notes that singular they and them have become much more widespread since Gowers' original comments, but still finds it "safer" to treat a sentence like 'The reader may toss their book aside' as incorrect "in formal English", while rejecting even more strongly sentences like

"There must be opportunity for the individual boy or girl to go as far as his keenness and ability will take him."

The Times Style and Usage Guide (first published in 2003 by The Times of London) recommends avoiding sentences like

"If someone loves animals, they should protect them."

by using a plural construction:

"If people love animals, they should protect them."

The Cambridge Guide to English Usage (2004, Cambridge University Press) finds singular they "unremarkable":

For those listening or reading, it has become unremarkable – an element of common usage.

It expresses several preferences.

- "Generic/universal their provides a gender-free pronoun, avoiding the exclusive his and the clumsy his/her. It avoids gratuitous sexism and gives the statement broadest reference ... They, them, their are now freely used in agreement with singular indefinite pronouns and determiners, those with universal implications such as any(one), every(one), no(one), as well as each and some(one), whose reference is often more individual ..."

The Economist Style Guide refers to the use of they in sentences like

"We can't afford to squander anyone's talents, whatever colour their skin is."

as "scrambled syntax that people adopt because they cannot bring themselves to use a singular pronoun".

New Hart's Rules (Oxford University Press, 2012) is aimed at those engaged in copy editing, and the emphasis is on the formal elements of presentation including punctuation and typeface, rather than on linguistic style, although – like The Chicago Manual of Style – it makes occasional forays into matters of usage. It advises against use of the purportedly gender-neutral he, and suggests cautious use of they where he or she presents problems.

... it is now regarded ... as old-fashioned or sexist to use he in reference to a person of unspecified sex, as in every child needs to know that he is loved. The alternative he or she is often preferred, and in formal contexts probably the best solution, but can become tiresome or long-winded when used frequently. Use of they in this sense (everyone needs to feel that they matter) is becoming generally accepted both in speech and in writing, especially where it occurs after an indefinite pronoun such as everyone or someone, but should not be imposed by an editor if an author has used he or she consistently.

The 2011 edition of the New International Version Bible uses singular they instead of the traditional he when translating pronouns that apply to both genders in the original Greek or Hebrew. This decision was based on research by a commission that studied modern English usage and determined that singular they (them/their) was by far the most common way that English-language speakers and writers today refer back to singular antecedents such as whoever, anyone, somebody, a person, no one, and the like."

The British edition of The Handbook of Nonsexist Writing, modified in some respects from the original US edition to conform to differences in culture and vocabulary, preserved the same recommendations, allowing singular they with semantically plural terms like "everyone" and indeterminate ones like "person", but recommending a rewrite to avoid.

=== Australian usage guidance ===
The Australian Federation Press Style Guide for Use in Preparation of Book Manuscripts recommends "gender-neutral language should be used", stating that use of they and their as singular pronouns is acceptable.

=== Usage guidance in English grammars ===
The Cambridge Grammar of the English Language discusses the prescriptivist argument that they is a plural pronoun and that the use of they with a singular "antecedent" therefore violates the rule of agreement between antecedent and pronoun, but takes the view that they, though primarily plural, can also be singular in a secondary extended sense, comparable to the purportedly extended sense of he to include female gender.

Use of singular they is stated to be "particularly common", even "stylistically neutral" with antecedents such as everyone, someone, and no one, but more restricted when referring to common nouns as antecedents, as in

"The patient should be told at the outset how much they will be required to pay."
"A friend of mine has asked me to go over and help them ..."

Use of the pronoun themself is described as being "rare" and "acceptable only to a minority of speakers", while use of the morphologically plural themselves is considered problematic when referring to someone rather than everyone (since only the latter implies a plural set).

There are also issues of grammatical acceptability when reflexive pronouns refer to singular noun phrases joined by or, the following all being problematic:

"Either the husband or the wife has perjured himself." [ungrammatical]
"Either the husband or the wife has perjured themselves." [of questionable grammaticality]
"Either the husband or the wife has perjured themself." [typically used by only some speakers of Standard English].

On the motivation for using singular they, A Student's Introduction to English Grammar states:

this avoidance of he can't be dismissed just as a matter of political correctness. The real problem with using he is that it unquestionably colours the interpretation, sometimes inappropriately ... he doesn't have a genuinely sex-neutral sense.

The alternative he or she can be "far too cumbersome", as in:

"Everyone agreed that he or she would bring his or her lunch with him or her.

or even "flatly ungrammatical", as in

"Everyone's here, isn't he or she?

"Among younger speakers", use of singular they even with definite noun-phrase antecedents finds increasing acceptance, "sidestepping any presumption about the sex of the person referred to", as in:

"You should ask your partner what they think."

"The person I was with said they hated the film." Example given by Huddleston et al.

=== Older style guides (not newly published after 2000) ===
According to A Comprehensive Grammar of the English Language (1985):

The pronoun they is commonly used as a 3rd person singular pronoun that is neutral between masculine and feminine ... At one time restricted to informal usage. it is now increasingly accepted in formal usage, especially in [American English].

==== The Little, Brown Handbook (1992) ====
According to The Little, Brown Handbook, most experts – and some teachers and employers – find use of singular they unacceptable:

Although some experts accept they, them, and their with singular indefinite words, most do not, and many teachers and employers regard the plural as incorrect. To be safe, work for agreement between singular indefinite words and the pronouns that refer to them ....

It recommends using he or she or avoiding the problem by rewriting the sentence to use a plural or omit the pronoun.

==== The American Heritage Book of English Usage (1996) ====
According to The American Heritage Book of English Usage and its usage panel of selected writers, journalism professors, linguists, and other experts, many Americans avoid use of they to refer to a singular antecedent out of respect for a "traditional" grammatical rule, despite use of singular they by modern writers of note and mainstream publications:

Most of the Usage Panel rejects the use of they with singular antecedents as ungrammatical, even in informal speech. Eighty-two percent find the sentence The typical student in the program takes about six years to complete their course work unacceptable ... panel members seem to make a distinction between singular nouns, such as the typical student and a person, and pronouns that are grammatically singular but semantically plural, such as anyone, everyone and no one. Sixty-four percent of panel members accept the sentence No one is willing to work for those wages anymore, are they?

== Grammatical and logical analysis ==
=== Notional agreement ===
Notional agreement is the idea that some uses of they might refer to a grammatically singular antecedent seen as semantically plural:

"'Tis meet that some more audience than a mother, since nature makes them partial, should o'erhear the speech."

— Shakespeare, Hamlet (1599); quoted in Merriam-Webster's Concise Dictionary of English Usage.

"No man goes to battle to be killed." ... "But they do get killed."

— George Bernard Shaw, quoted in Merriam-Webster's Concise Dictionary of English Usage

According to notional agreement, in the Shakespeare quotation a mother is syntactically singular, but stands for all mothers; and in the Shaw quotation no man is syntactically singular (taking the singular form goes), but is semantically plural (all go [to kill] not to be killed), hence idiomatically requiring they. Such use, which goes back a long way, includes examples where the sex is known, as in the above examples.

=== Distribution ===
Distributive constructions apply a single idea to multiple members of a group. They are typically marked in English by words like each, every and any. The simplest examples are applied to groups of two, and use words like either and or – "Would you like tea or coffee?". Since distributive constructions apply an idea relevant to each individual in the group, rather than to the group as a whole, they are most often conceived of as singular, and a singular pronoun is used:

"England expects that every man will do his duty."

— Nelson (1805), referring to a fleet crewed by male sailors)

"Every dog hath his day."

— John Ray, A Collection of English Proverbs (1670), originally from Plutarch, Moralia, c. 95 AD, regarding the death of Euripides.

However, many languages, including English, show ambivalence in this regard. Because distribution also requires a group with more than one member, plural forms are sometimes used. (Note: "Either the plural or the singular may be acceptable for a true bound pronoun ...": "Every student thinks she / they is / are smart.")

=== Referential and non-referential anaphors ===
The singular they, which uses the same verb form that plurals do, is typically used to refer to an indeterminate antecedent, for example:

"The person you mentioned, are they coming?"

In some sentences, typically those including words like every or any, the morphologically singular antecedent does not refer to a single entity but is "anaphorically linked" to the associated pronoun to indicate a set of pairwise relationships, as in the sentence:

"Everyone returned to their seats." (where each person is associated with one seat)

Linguists like Steven Pinker and Rodney Huddleston explain sentences like this (and others) in terms of bound variables, a term borrowed from logic. Pinker prefers the terms quantifier and bound variable to antecedent and pronoun. He suggests that pronouns used as "variables" in this way are more appropriately regarded as homonyms of the equivalent referential pronouns.

The following shows different types of anaphoric reference, using various pronouns, including they:

- Coreferential, with a definite antecedent (the antecedent and the anaphoric pronoun both refer to the same real-world entity):
"Your wife phoned but she didn't leave a message."
- Coreferential with an indefinite antecedent:
"One of your girlfriends phoned, but she didn't leave a message."
"One of your boyfriends phoned, but he didn't leave a message."
"One of your friends phoned, but they didn't leave a message."
- Reference to a hypothetical, indefinite entity
"If you had an unemployed daughter, what would you think if she wanted to accept work as a mercenary?"
"If you had an unemployed child, what would you think if they wanted to accept work as a mercenary?"
- A bound variable pronoun is anaphorically linked to a quantifier (no single real-world or hypothetical entity is referenced; examples and explanations from Huddleston and Pullum, The Cambridge Grammar of the English Language):
"No one put their hand up." [approximately: "There is no person x such that x put x's hand up."]
"Every car had its windscreen broken." [approximately: "For every car x, x had x's windscreen broken."]

== Cognitive efficiency ==
A study of whether "singular they" is more "difficult" to understand than gendered pronouns found that "singular they is a cognitively efficient substitute for generic he or she, particularly when the antecedent is nonreferential" (e.g. anybody, a nurse, or a truck driver) rather than referring to a specific person (e.g. a runner I knew or my nurse). Clauses with singular they were read "just as quickly as clauses containing a gendered pronoun that matched the stereotype of the antecedent" (e.g. she for a nurse and he for a truck driver) and "much more quickly than clauses containing a gendered pronoun that went against the gender stereotype of the antecedent".

On the other hand, when the pronoun they was used to refer to known individuals ("referential antecedents, for which the gender was presumably known", e.g. my nurse, that truck driver, a runner I knew), reading was slowed when compared with use of a gendered pronoun consistent with the "stereotypic gender" (e.g. he for a specific truck driver).

The study concluded that "the increased use of singular they is not problematic for the majority of readers".

A 2024 study by Arnold, Venkatesh, and Vig stated that two-thirds of people used an incorrect pronoun at least once in speaking about someone who used singular they, versus never when speaking about someone who used he or she, suggesting that singular they caused some difficulty, but the rate of errors was low (9%). They wrote that whereas people may repeat a name to avoid using the pronoun they in writing, in speech people used singular they at least as frequently as binary pronouns, "suggesting that any difficulty does not result in pronoun avoidance" in speech.

== Comparison with other pronouns ==
The singular and plural use of they can be compared with the pronoun you, which had been both a plural and polite singular, but by the 18th century replaced thou for singular referents. For "you", the singular reflexive pronoun ("yourself") is different from its plural reflexive pronoun ("yourselves"); with "they" one can hear either "themself" or "themselves" for the singular reflexive pronoun.

Singular "they" has also been compared to nosism (such as the "royal we"), when a single person uses first-person plural in place of first-person singular pronouns. Similar to singular "you", its singular reflexive pronoun ("ourself") is different from the plural reflexive pronoun ("ourselves").

While the pronoun set derived from it is primarily used for inanimate objects, it is frequently used in an impersonal context when someone's identity is unknown or established on a provisional basis, e.g. "Who is it?" or "With this new haircut, no one knows it is me." It is also used for infants of unspecified gender but may be considered dehumanizing and is therefore more likely in a clinical context. Otherwise, in more personal contexts, the use of it to refer to a person might indicate antipathy or other negative emotions.

It can also be used for non-human animals of unspecified sex, though they is common for pets and other domesticated animals of unspecified sex, especially when referred to by a proper name (e.g. Rags, Snuggles). Normally, birds and mammals with a known sex are referred to by their respective male or female pronoun (he and she; him and her).

== Use of singular they in question tags ==
For question tags (like isn't it, aren't they) is used to turn a statement into a question to ask for confirmation, seek agreement, or request more information, which is very common is general speech or informal writing. For indefinite pronouns for people like somebody, everyone, nobody, we use they in the question tag. Even though the verb in the main clause (is) is singular, the verb in the question tag must be plural (are) to agree with the pronoun they even in the singular form. Here are some examples:

"Everybody's unique, aren't they?"
"No-one is perfect, are they?"

== See also ==
- English personal pronouns
- Gender neutrality in English
- Notional agreement
- Spivak pronoun
- Neopronoun
- Gender neutrality in languages with gendered third-person pronouns
- Rolling pronouns

== Bibliography ==
- Abadi, Mark (8 January 2016). "'They' was just named 2015's Word of the Year". Business Insider. Archived from the original on 9 January 2016.
- The American Heritage Book of English Usage: A Practical and Authoritative Guide to Contemporary English. Houghton Mifflin Harcourt. 1996. ISBN 978-0-547-56321-3. Archived from the original on 13 December 2023.
- "2015 Word of the Year is singular they" (Press release). American Dialect Society. 8 January 2016. Archived from the original on 6 March 2023.
- Publication Manual of the American Psychological Association (5th ed.). American Psychological Association. 2001. ISBN 1-55798-790-4.
- Arnold, Jennifer E; Venkatesh, Ranjani; Vig, Zachary A (2024). "Gender competition in the production of nonbinary 'they'". Glossa Psycholinguistics. 3 (1). doi:10.5070/G60111306. Archived from the original on 24 April 2024.
- Badendyck, C. (7 July 1985). "[Letter commenting on] Hypersexism And the Feds". The New York Times. Archived from the original on 28 June 2017. As quoted by Miller and Swift.
- Baskervill, W. M.; Sewell, J. W. (1895). An English Grammar. Archived from the original on 14 October 2013.
- Berry, Chris; Brizee, Allen. "Using Pronouns Clearly". Archived from the original on 12 July 2014.
- Bodine, Ann (August 1975). "Androcentrism in Prescriptive Grammar: Singular They, Sex-Indefinite He, and He or She" (PDF). Language in Society. 4 (2). Cambridge University Press: 129–146. doi:10.1017/s0047404500004607. ISSN 0047-4045. JSTOR 4166805. S2CID 146362006. Archived (PDF) from the original on 26 April 2023.
- The Chicago Manual of Style: The Essential Guide for Writers, Editors, and Publishers (14th ed.). University of Chicago Press. 1993. ISBN 978-0-226-10389-1.
- The Chicago Manual of Style (17th ed.). University of Chicago Press. 2017. ISBN 9780226287058. Archived from the original on 2 March 2021.
- The Chicago Manual of Style (18th ed.). University of Chicago Press. 2024. ISBN 9780226817972. Archived from the original on 29 April 2025.
- Choy, Penelope; Clark, Dorothy Goldbart (2010). Basic Grammar and Usage (8th ed.). Cengage Learning. ISBN 978-1-428-21155-1. Archived from the original on 13 December 2023.
- Griggs, Brandon (13 February 2014). "Facebook goes beyond 'male' and 'female' with new gender options". CNN. Archived from the original on 16 October 2018.
- Curzan, Anne (2003). Gender Shifts in the History of English. Studies in English Language. Cambridge University Press. ISBN 978-1-139-43668-7. Archived from the original on 13 December 2023.
- Duží, Marie; Jespersen, Bjørn; Materna, Pavel (2010). Procedural Semantics for Hyperintensional Logic: Foundations and Applications of Transparent Intensional Logic. Springer Netherlands. ISBN 9789048188123.
- Economist Style Guide (10th ed.). The Economist Group / Profile Books. 2010. ISBN 978-1-846-68606-1.
- "Federation Press Style Guide for Use in Preparation of Book Manuscripts" (PDF). Archived from the original (PDF) on 10 May 2013.
- Fisher, Ann (1750) [1745]. A New Grammar: Being the Most Easy Guide to Speaking and Writing the English Language Properly and Correctly (reprinted in facsimile) (2nd ed.). Scolar Press. Archived from the original on 13 December 2023.
- Fowler, Henry Ramsey; Aaron, Jane E. (1992). The Little, Brown Handbook (5th ed.). HarperCollins. pp. 300–301. ISBN 978-0-673-52132-3.. N.B.: This is not the English usage authority Henry Watson Fowler.
- Fowler, H. W.; Crystal, David (2009) [1926]. A Dictionary of Modern English Usage. Oxford University Press. ISBN 978-0-199-58589-2.
- Fowler, H. W.; Gowers, Sir Ernest (1965). A Dictionary of Modern English Usage. Oxford University Press.
- Fowler, H. W.; Burchfield, R. W. (1996). The New Fowler's Modern English Usage. Oxford University Press. ISBN 978-0-198-61021-2.
- Fowler, H. W. (2015). Butterfield, Jeremy (ed.). Fowler's Dictionary of Modern English Usage. Oxford University Press. ISBN 978-0-19-966135-0.
- Foertsch, Julie; Gernsbacher, Morton Ann (March 1997). "In Search of Gender Neutrality: Is Singular They a Cognitively Efficient Substitute for Generic He?" (PDF). Psychological Science. 8 (2): 106–111. doi:10.1111/j.1467-9280.1997.tb00691.x. PMC 4293036. PMID 25593408. Archived from the original (PDF) on 2 May 2015.
- Garner, Bryan A. (2003). Garner's Modern American Usage. Oxford University Press. ISBN 978-0-19-516191-5.
- Garner, Bryan A. (2016). Garner's Modern English Usage. Oxford University Press. ISBN 978-0-19-049148-2.
- Gowers, Ernest; Fraser, Bruce (1973). The Complete Plain Words. H.M. Stationery Office. Bibcode:1973cpw..book.....G. ISBN 978-0-11-700340-8.
- Gowers, Ernest; Gowers, Rebecca (2014). Plain Words. London: Particular. ISBN 978-0-241-96035-6. Archived from the original on 13 December 2023.
- Guo, Jeff (8 January 2016). "Sorry, grammar nerds. The singular 'they' has been declared Word of the Year". The Washington Post. Archived from the original on 8 January 2016.
- Huang, C. T. J. (2009). Between Syntax and Semantics. Taylor & Francis. ISBN 978-0-203-87352-6. Archived from the original on 13 December 2023.
- Huddleston, Rodney; Pullum, Geoffrey (2002). The Cambridge Grammar of the English Language. Cambridge; New York: Cambridge University Press. ISBN 978-0-521-43146-0.
- Huddleston, Rodney D.; Pullum, Geoffrey K. (2005). A Student's Introduction to English Grammar. Cambridge University Press. ISBN 978-0-521-84837-4.
- Gerner, Jürgen (2000). "Singular and Plural Anaphors of Indefinite Plural Pronouns in Spoken British English". In Kirk, John M. (ed.). Corpora Galore: Analyses and Techniques in Describing English: Papers from the Nineteenth International Conference on English Language Research on Computerised Corpora (ICAME 1998). Rodopi. pp. 93–114. ISBN 978-90-420-0419-1. Archived from the original on 13 December 2023.
- Kolln, Martha (1986). "Everyone's Right to Their Own Language". College Composition and Communication. 37 (1). National Council of Teachers of English: 100–102. doi:10.2307/357389. ISSN 0010-096X. JSTOR 357389.
- Leonard, Sterling Andrus (1929). The Doctrine of Correctness in English Usage, 1700-1800. Russell & Russell. Archived from the original on 13 December 2020.
- Liberman, Mark (11 January 2015). "Annals of singular "they"". Archived from the original on 17 January 2016.
- Matossian, Lou Ann (1997). Burglars, Babysitters, and Persons: A Sociolinguistic Study of Generic Pronoun Usage in Philadelphia and Minneapolis (PDF). Institute for Research in Cognitive Science. University of Pennsylvania Press. Archived from the original (PDF) on 19 February 2012.
- Merriam-Webster's Concise Dictionary of English Usage. Penguin. 2002. ISBN 9780877796336.
- Miller, Casey; Swift, Kate (1995) [1981]. Mosse, Kate (ed.). The Handbook of Non-Sexist Writing for Writers, Editors and Speakers (3rd British ed.). The Women's Press. ISBN 978-07043-44426.
- "New Hart's Rules". New Oxford Style Manual. Oxford University Press. 2012. ISBN 978-0-199-65722-3.
- Newman, Michael (1998). "What Can Pronouns Tell Us? A Case Study of English Epicenes". Studies in Language. 22 (2). John Benjamins: 353–389. doi:10.1075/sl.22.2.04new. ISSN 0378-4177.
- Paterson, Laura Louise (2014). British Pronoun Use, Prescription, and Processing: Linguistic and Social Influences Affecting 'They' and 'He'. Palgrave Macmillan.
- Peters, Pam (2004). The Cambridge Guide to English Usage. Cambridge: Cambridge University Press. ISBN 978-3-125-33187-7.
- Ostade, Ingrid Tieken-Boon van (28 August 2000). "Female grammarians of the eighteenth century". University of Leiden. Archived from the original on 9 June 2011.
- Pauwels, Anne (2003). "Linguistic sexism and feminist linguistic activism". In Holmes, Janet; Meyerhoff, Miriam (eds.). The Handbook of Language and Gender. Malden, MA: Blackwell. ISBN 978-0-631-22502-7.
- Pinker, Steven (1995) [1994]. "The Language Mavens". The Language Instinct. Penguin. ISBN 978-0140175295.
- Pinker, Steven (2014). The Sense of Style: The Thinking Person's Guide to Writing in the 21st Century. Penguin. ISBN 9780698170308. Archived from the original on 13 December 2023.
- Poole, Josua (1646). The English Accidence. Scolar Press.
- Pullum, Geoffrey (13 April 2012). "Sweden's gender-neutral 3rd-person singular pronoun". Archived from the original on 8 May 2016. "... our pronoun they was originally borrowed into English from the Scandinavian language family ... and since then has been doing useful service in English as the morphosyntactically plural but singular-antecedent-permitting gender-neutral pronoun known to linguists as singular they."
- Quirk, Randolph; Greenbaum, Sidney; Leech, Geoffrey; Svartvik, Jan (1985). A Comprehensive Grammar of the English Language. Harlow: Longman. ISBN 978-0-582-51734-9.
- Ross, Michael; West, Keith (2002). Delivering the Framework for Teaching English. Nelson Thornes. ISBN 9780748762620. Archived from the original on 13 December 2023.
- Safire, William (28 April 1985). "On Language; You Not Tarzan, Me Not Jane". The New York Times. Archived from the original on 7 January 2017.
- Steinmetz, Katy (8 January 2016). "This Pronoun Is the Word of the Year for 2015". Time. Archived from the original on 10 January 2016.
- Strunk, William; White, E. B. (1979). The Elements of Style (3rd ed.). Allyn & Bacon. ISBN 978-0-205-19158-1.
- Strunk, William; White, E. B. (2000) [1959]. The Elements of Style (4th ed.). Allyn & Bacon. ISBN 978-0-205-31342-6.
- Swan, Michael (2009). Practical English Usage (3rd ed.). Oxford University Press. ISBN 978-0-194-42098-3.
- Teich, Nicholas M. (2012). Transgender 101: A Simple Guide to a Complex Issue. New York: Columbia University Press. ISBN 978-0-231-15712-4.
- Wales, Katie (1996). Personal Pronouns in Present-Day English. Cambridge University Press. ISBN 9780521471022. Archived from the original on 13 December 2023.
- Walsh, Bill (4 December 2015). "The Post drops the 'mike' – and the hyphen in 'e-mail'". The Washington Post. Archived from the original on 17 January 2020.
- Warenda, Amy (April 1993). "They" (PDF). The WAC Journal. 4: 99–107. doi:10.37514/WAC-J.1993.4.1.09 (inactive 13 November 2026). Archived (PDF) from the original on 2 March 2013.
- "New Bible draws critics of gender-neutral language". The Washington Post. Associated Press. 17 March 2011. Archived from the original on 5 March 2016.
- Williams, Joseph M. (2008). Style: The Basics of Clarity and Grace. Longman. ISBN 978-0205605354.
- Wilson, Thomas (1560). Mair, George Herbert (ed.). The Arte of Rhetorique. Clarendon. Archived from the original on 4 June 2016.
- Wolfram, Walt; Schilling, Natalie (2016). American English: Dialects and Variation (3rd ed.). Wiley Blackwell. ISBN 9781118391457.
