= Gender marking in job titles =

Job name that specifies or implies gender

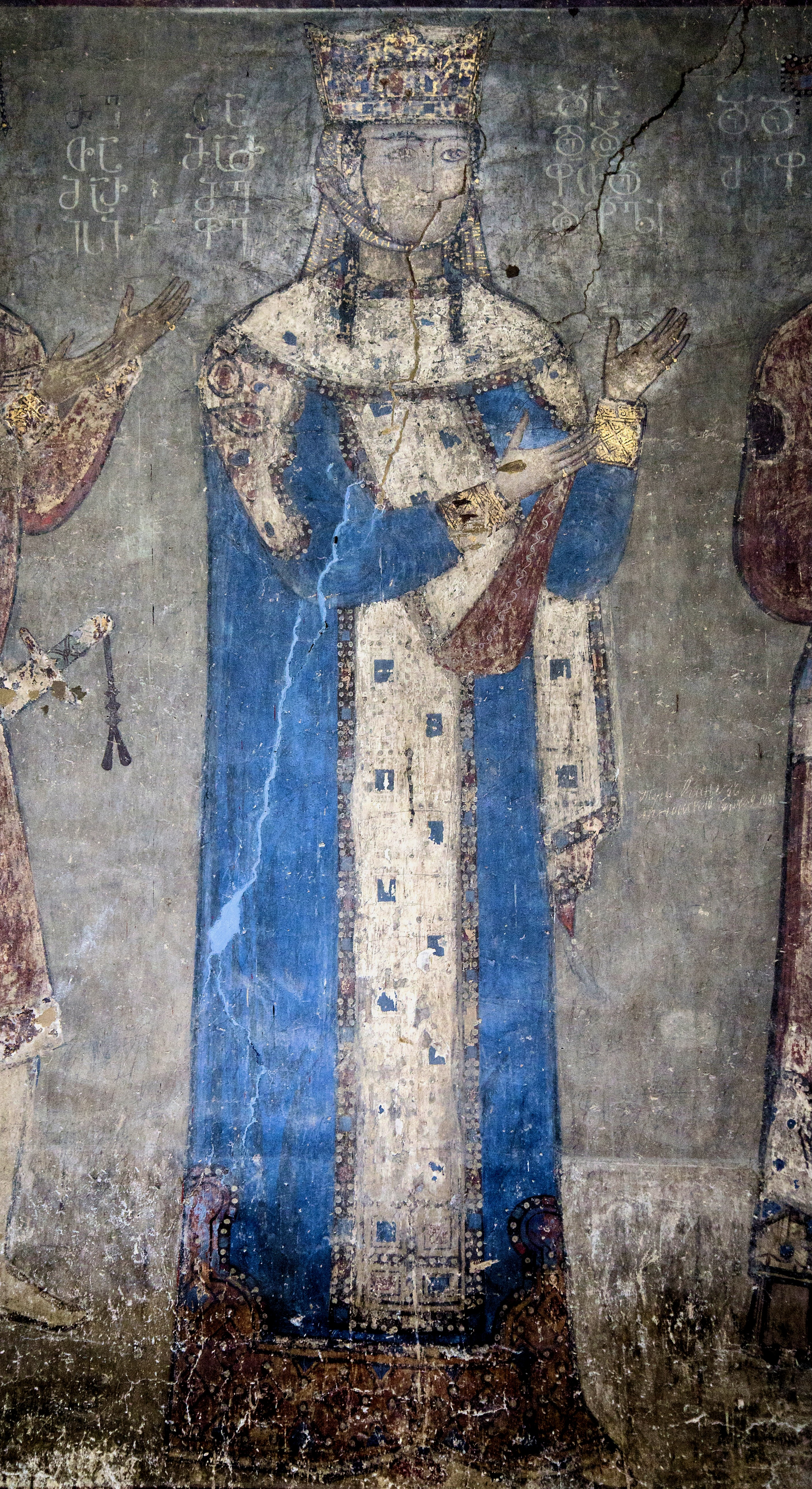
Tamar, the 13th century female monarch of Georgia titled as mepe (literally King) Tamar

A gender-specific job title is a name of a job that also specifies or implies the gender of the person performing that job. For example, in English, the job titles stewardess and seamstress imply that the person is female, whilst the corresponding job titles steward and seamster imply that the person is male. A gender-neutral job title, on the other hand, is one that does not specify or imply gender, such as firefighter or lawyer. In some cases, it may be debatable whether a title is gender-specific; for example, chairman appears to denote a male (because of the ending -man), but the title is also applied sometimes to women.

Proponents of gender-neutral language generally advocate the use of gender-neutral job titles, particularly in contexts where the gender of the person in question is not known or not specified. For example, they prefer flight attendant to stewardess or steward, and police officer to policeman or policewoman. In some cases this may involve deprecating the use of certain specifically female titles (such as authoress), thus encouraging the use of the corresponding unmarked form (such as author) as a fully gender-neutral title.

The above applies to gender neutrality in English and in some other languages without grammatical gender (where grammatical gender is a feature of a language's grammar that requires every noun to be placed in one of several classes, often including feminine and masculine). In languages with grammatical gender, the situation is altered by the fact that nouns for people are often constrained to be inherently masculine or feminine, and the production of truly gender-neutral titles may not be possible. In such cases, proponents of gender-neutral language may instead focus on ensuring that feminine and masculine words exist for every job, and that they are treated with equal status.

== Examples ==
The suffix -man had the meanings "person" and "adult male" in Old English (see man), but, even when used as a gender-neutral term to include women, it was understood to still mainly refer to males. Around the 20th century, the gender-neutral use of man and -man declined. Thus job titles that include this suffix, such as fireman, salesman and alderman, generally imply that the holder is male. While some of these job titles have feminine variants (e.g. alderwoman), others do not, because traditionally the positions in question were not occupied by women. For most such titles, gender-neutral equivalents now also exist, such as police officer, salesperson or sales representative (for salesman or saleswoman), etc. However, some proposed gender-neutral terms have not attained such common usage (as with fisher as an alternative to fisherman). Military ranks with the suffix -man normally remain unchanged when applied to women: for example, a woman serving in the Royal Electrical and Mechanical Engineers might be known as Craftsman Atkins.

Examining the Time magazine corpus (texts from the 1920s to the 2000s), researcher Maria Bovin found:

The usage of the neutral term fire fighter has increased, starting in the 1980s. In the 1990s, the frequency of usage is lower, but it is also evident from the rows showing the total instances of all of the terms that the overall mentioning of the professionals in this line of work was less frequent in this decade. In addition, it is notable that the usage of firewoman is non-existent. In the case of policewoman, the frequency of usage is very low in all of the decades examined, but there are at least some instances of the term being used. The term firewoman, on the other hand, appears to never have been used in the magazine.

In the case of chairman, gender-neutral alternatives (such as chair and chairperson) exist, although in some contexts the word chairman is used even where it denotes (or could denote) a woman. For details, see Chairman.

Feminine terms such as actress, usherette and comedienne are marked with respect to the masculine (actor, usher, comedian) both formally (i.e. something is added to the masculine form) and in the sense that only the masculine form can be used generically to describe a mixed-gender group of people. This means that the "masculine" form can in fact serve as a gender-neutral term (a solution often favored by proponents of gender-neutral language, who thus tend to deprecate or restrict usage of the specifically feminine forms). Some such feminine forms, such as poetess and authoress, are now rarely used. Others, such as actress, remain common, although increasing numbers of women are calling themselves actors rather than actresses. The Screen Actors Guild annually gives out awards for "Best Male Actor" and "Best Female Actor".

The term waiter appears to retain masculine specificity (with waitress as the corresponding feminine term). Other gender-neutral terms have therefore been proposed, such as server (alternatives include waitron, waitstaff or waitperson), though these are rarely used outside North America.

The term midwife looks superficially to be feminine (since it ends with -wife), but it is used for either gender. The term comes from an Old English term meaning "with the woman".

In an examination of "business-related titles" such as businessman and business people, "overall usage of these terms seems to have decreased since the 1960s" when examining Time magazine: When "looking specifically at the difference between the gender-marked titles and the gender-neutral ones, businessperson(s) and businesspeople, there has been an increase usage of the neutral businesspeople (if all spelling variations are included). Yet, this is not a large increase, and as it is used to refer to a group of people rather than an individual, its relevance may be questionable. Noticeable is the fact that businessperson is remarkably infrequent, and only appears in three decades. The term businesswoman may be increasing again between the 1980s and the 2000s, after a lower usage in the preceding fifty years. It has its highest frequency of usage in the 1920s."

Origin of the word "master" are late Old English: "a man having control or authority; a teacher or tutor", from Latin magister (n.), a contrastive adjective ("he who is greater") meaning "chief, head, director, teacher", and the source of Old French maistre, French maître, Spanish and Italian maestro, Portuguese mestre, Dutch meester, German Meister.

"Garner's Usage Tip of the Day" states, in regards to "layman; layperson; lay person", that "'Layman' is the most common among these terms and is commonly regarded as unexceptionable — in reference to members of both sexes, of course."

== Evolution over time ==
The case for switching to gender-neutral job titles usually makes an ideological argument, that gender-specific job titles at some level promote sexism in the workplace. For example, fire chiefs have argued that when the public uses the term "fireman" instead of "firefighter", it reinforces the popular image that firefighting is only a job for men, and thus makes it difficult for them to recruit women. Studies found that people assume maleness when they read job titles with -man, and they found that women were less likely to apply to jobs that used -man in their application or that used gender-coded words such as "dominate" or "aggressive."

During the 19th century, attempts to overlay Latin grammar rules onto English required the use of feminine endings in nouns ending with -ess. This produced words like doctress and professoress and even lawyeress, all of which have fallen out of use; though waitress, stewardess, and actress are in modern use.

Use of the term chairman remains widespread in predominantly male sectors of society, but chairperson or chair is now widespread in society in general, at least in the US, Canada and increasingly in the UK. For example, the boards of most Fortune 500 companies in the United States are presided over by a "chairman" and also the overwhelming majority of the (FTSE 100) companies in the United Kingdom have a "chairman", while committees in the United States House of Representatives are presided over by a "chair", as of 2009. Since most of these are, however, men, a more correct description of the current language situation needs to consider use in organisations whose chairperson is a woman. Less than half of the members of the American Heritage Dictionary's usage panel accept the use of the word chairman in describing a woman.

Some usage guides, such as The Cambridge Guide to English Usage, advocate gender-neutral language in circumstances where all sexes are meant to be included. For instance, a business might advertise that it is looking for a new chair or chairperson rather than chairman. Gender-neutral language discourages chairman, on the grounds that some readers would assume women and those of other genders are implicitly excluded from responding to an advertisement using this word.

Feminist Philosophy of Language, a guide on sexism in language and feminist language reform, also discourages the usage of man and -man as gender-neutral because it has male bias and erases women under a masculine word. They also discourage titles like "lady doctor" because it makes men the default and implies that the ability and competence of workers, in this case a doctor, are dependent on their sex.

The United States military has also examined traditional job titles, in line with the 2016 decision to allow women to serve in all combat jobs.

== Generally accepted writing conventions ==
Proponents of gender-neutral job titles believe that such titles should be used, especially when referring to hypothetical persons. For example, firefighter instead of fireman; mail carrier, letter carrier, or post worker rather than mailman; flight attendant instead of steward or stewardess; bartender instead of barman or barmaid. In the rare case where no useful gender-neutral alternative is available, they believe both male and female terms should be used.

Proponents of gender-neutral language advocate the use of a neuter form when/where appropriate. For example, a company may seek to fill a vacancy and hire a new chairperson. Since a gendered individual doesn't currently hold the position, its title reverts to a neuter form. Once that position is filled, many advocates believe gender can be attached to the title as appropriate (chairman or chairwoman).

Sometimes this formulation can lead to inconsistent gender-specific usage, in which women become chairpersons but men remain chairmen. Some women opt to use the word chairman in preference to chairwoman, subject to the style Madam or Mister prefixing the title, which they perceive to be gender-neutral by itself. Particularly in academia, the word Chair is often used to designate the person chosen to oversee the agenda at meetings of an organized group.

The principle of gender-neutral language dictates that job titles that add suffixes to make them feminine should be avoided. For example, "usher", not "usherette"; "comedian", not "comedienne". Some of these are almost entirely obsolete now, such as sculptress, authoress, poetess, and aviatrix. If gender is relevant, the words woman or female should be used instead of "lady" ("my grandmother was the first female doctor in the province"), except if the masculine is "lord" (as in "landlady"). In the case of landlord or landlady, it may be preferable to find an equivalent title with the same meaning, such as proprietor or lessor. However, when a woman is in the office of "the Gentleman Usher of the Black Rod", it is changed to "the Lady Usher of the Black Rod" or simply "Usher of the Black Rod", as in Canada.

Advisors on non-sexist usage deprecate terms such as "male nurse", "female doctor", "male model", or "female judge" because such terms are often used when the gender and sex is irrelevant. These advisors say that the statement of exception reinforces harmful assumptions about the gender of people in those professions.

== Languages other than English ==
When words have a grammatical gender associated with them, in many languages, they may impose morphological requirements to maintain sentence agreement. That is, there is a non-political content to the word changes, or inflection. Nevertheless, gender-identification word endings are sometimes dropped, something that happened often in the former East Germany, for example. Sometimes an entirely new or etymologically unrelated word is coined. For example, when men in France wanted to become midwives, which up until then was an exclusively female occupation, they chose not to adapt the existing term sage-femme ('wise woman'), and instead coined maïeuticien.

In German, feminine job titles are usually created by adding -in to the grammatically masculine word in question. For example, the general grammatically masculine term for train driver is Lokführer (singular or plural). This yields the feminine form Lokführerin (plural: Lokführerinnen). One convention in German for gender-neutral language is adding a gender star, e.g. "Lokführer*innen", which is used to refer to train drivers of all genders. For job listings, if the generic masculine form is used, the Gesellschaft für deutsche Sprache recommends adding an explanatory note "(männlich/weiblich/divers)" or "(m/w/d)", indicating the role is open to persons of all genders.

In contrast, the German military does not have separate gendered ranks. Even though the grammatically female form of Arzt is Ärztin, the correct form of address for a female medical officer is "Frau Stabsarzt" and not "Frau Stabsärztin".

== See also ==
- Epicene
- Gender role
- Gender-neutral language
- Gender neutrality in English
- Third-person pronoun
