= Gender-neutral language =

Language avoiding bias towards a sex or social gender

Gender-neutral language or gender-inclusive language is language that avoids reference towards a particular sex or gender. In English, this includes use of nouns that are not gender-specific to refer to roles or professions, formation of phrases in a coequal manner, and discontinuing the collective use of male or female terms.

For example, the words policeman and stewardess are gender-specific job titles; corresponding gender-neutral terms are police officer and flight attendant. Some terms, such as salesman, which contain the component -man but have traditionally been used to refer to persons regardless of gender, are now seen as gender-specific and discouraged in favour of terms such as salesperson. An example of forming phrases in a coequal manner would be using husband and wife instead of man and wife. Examples of discontinuing the collective use of terms in English when referring to those with unknown or indeterminate gender as singular they, and using humans, people, or humankind, instead of man or mankind.

== History ==
The notion that parts of the English language were sexist was brought to mainstream attention in Western English cultures by feminists in the 1970s. Simultaneously, the link between language and ideologies (including traditional gender ideologies) was becoming apparent in the academic field of linguistics. In 1975, the National Council of Teachers of English published a set of guidelines on the use of "non-sexist" language. Backlash ensued, as did the debate on whether gender-neutral language ought to be enforced. In Britain, feminist Maija Blaubergs countered eight commonly used oppositional arguments in 1980. Other pushback on gender-neutral language included viewing gender-neutral language as grammatically incorrect although technically it is proper. Furthermore, there are links between perspective and pronouns used that makes people believe one is more formal than the other. Those pushing back on gender-neutral language want the use of inclusive pronouns and language. However, the use of combined pronouns such as s/he goes against linguistic democratization and does not allow for people who use other pronouns besides s/he. New South Wales, Australia required the use of they in place of he and she in subsequent laws. In 1985, the Canadian Corporation for Studies in Religion passed a motion for all its ensuing publications to include "non-sexist" language. By 1995, academic institutions in Canada and Britain had implemented "non-sexist" language policies. More recently, revisions to the Women's Press publications of The Handbook of Nonsexist Writing and The A–Z of Non-Sexist Language were made to de-radicalize the original works. In 2006, "non-sexist" was challenged: the term refers solely to the absence of sexism. In 2018, the State of New York enacted policy to formally use the gender-neutral terms police officer and firefighter.

The shift in gender-neutral language can be viewed from a historical perspective. Different waves of feminism during the 1970s caused a major shift from high rates of masculine nouns to a change around the 1980s along with a second major shift during the 1990s-2000's Historical perspective and approaches are important on gendered language in writing because it lets us understand patterns within different writing and the effects on the beliefs and use of gender-neutral language. For example, major effects of gendered language include gender educational gaps. Languages with grammatical gender, such as Spanish, lead to an increase in school completion rates for male students. A 0.75 year increase in the educational gap is seen with use of gendered language in languages, that have grammatical gender. The use of heavily gendered language in televised sports also shows us how it reinforces gender and racial hierarchies in media.

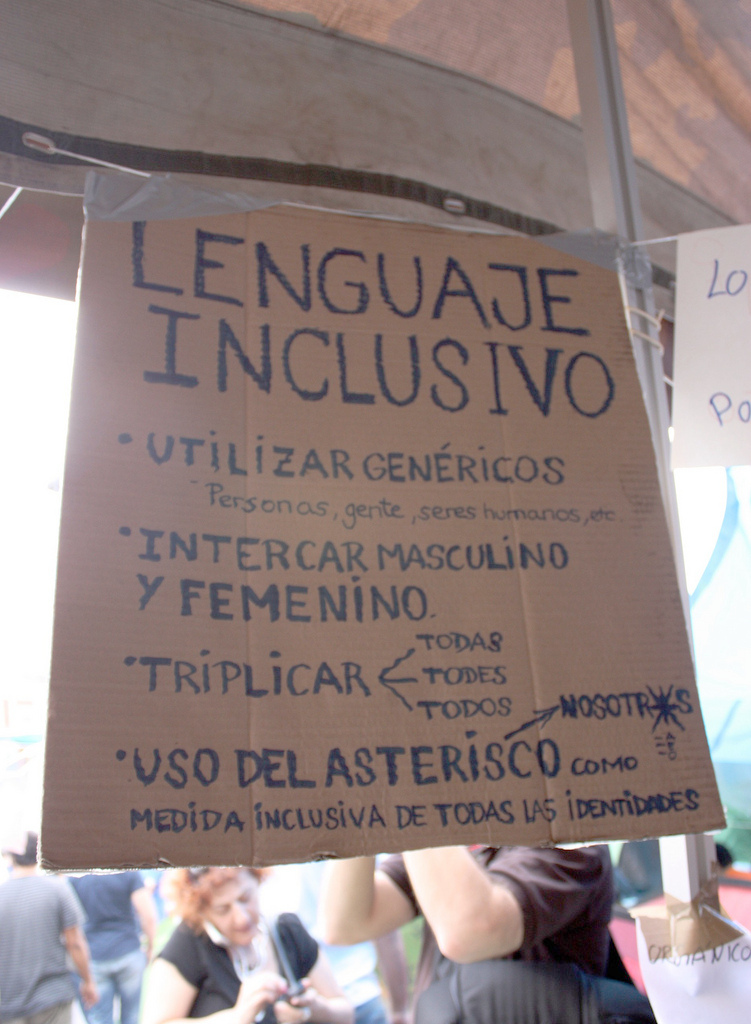
Sign with specific suggestions for gender-neutral language use in Spanish at a feminist protest in Madrid, Spain

== Terminology and views ==
=== General ===
Historically, the use of masculine pronouns in place of generic pronouns was regarded as non-sexist, but various forms of gender-neutral language became a common feature in written and spoken forms of many languages in the late twentieth century. Feminists argue that previously the practice of assigning masculine gender to generic antecedents stemmed from language reflecting "the prejudices of the society in which it evolved, and English evolved through most of its history in a male-centered, patriarchal society." During the 1970s, feminists Casey Miller and Kate Swift created a manual, The Handbook of Nonsexist Writing, on gender neutral language that was set to reform the existing sexist language that was said to exclude and dehumanize women. In 1995, the Women's Press published The A–Z of Non-Sexist Language, by Margaret Doyle. Both publications were written by American authors, originally without the consideration of the British-English dialect. Many feminist efforts were made to reform the androcentric language. It has become common in some academic and governmental settings to rely on gender-neutral language to convey inclusion of all sexes or genders (gender-inclusive language).

Various languages employ different means to achieve gender neutrality:

- Gender neutrality in languages with grammatical gender
- Gender neutrality in genderless languages
- Gender neutrality in English

Other particular issues are also discussed:

- Gender marking in job titles
- Gender-specific and gender-neutral pronouns

=== Gender indication ===
There are different approaches to forming a "gender-neutral language":

- Creating alternative gender-neutral pronouns, such as "hir", or "hen" in Swedish.

=== Specific examples ===
- NASA now prefers the use of "crewed" and "uncrewed" instead of "manned" and "unmanned", including when discussing historical spaceflight (except proper nouns).

Examples of gender indication in occupational titles
Gendered title	Gender-neutral title
businessman, businesswoman	business person/person in business, business people/people in business
chairman, chairwoman	chair, chairperson
mailman, mailwoman, postman, postwoman	mail carrier, letter carrier, postal worker
policeman, policewoman	police officer
salesman, saleswoman	salesperson, sales associate, salesclerk, sales executive
steward, stewardess	flight attendant
waiter, waitress	server, table attendant, waitron
fireman, firewoman	firefighter
barman, barwoman	bartender

== Controversy ==
=== Argentina ===
Argentina's capital, Buenos Aires, implemented a policy in June 2022 that forbade public educational institutions from using gender-neutral language, deeming it grammatically incorrect and causing developmental learning issues for students. In the Spanish language nouns are either feminine (usually ending in "a") or masculine (usually ending in "o"), but in recent years gender-neutral endings like "x" and "e" have gained popularity; for example, "Latinx" or "Latine" have become the gender-neutral options for the previously binary "Latino" or "Latina." Buenos Aires' objection to gender-neutral language in the classroom stems from concerns about linguistic correctness and preservation of the Spanish language. Those who support the development of gender-neutral language have expressed frustration with the male-dominance of the Spanish language: a group of students who are all female is "compañeras," but if one male student enters the group, the grammatically correct term for the students becomes "compañeros" with the masculine "o" ending.

=== Brazil ===
The professor at the Federal University of Mato Grosso (UFMT) Maria Inês da Silva Barbosa left the Municipal Conference of the Unified Health System (SUS), held in a hotel in Cuiabá, on 30 July 2025, after Mayor Abilio Brunini (PL) vetoed the use of a neutral pronoun.

A Law, sanctioned by President Lula on November 17 of 2025, instituted the National Plain Language Policy (Law 15.263/25), and in its item XI, Article 5, it states "not to use new forms of inflection of gender and number of words in the language in contravention of the consolidated grammatical rules, Vocabulary Orthographic of the Portuguese Language (Volp) and the Orthographic Agreement of the Portuguese Language, promulgated by Decree No. 6,583, of September 29, 2008".

Supreme Federal Court (STF) has revoked several laws and law proposals against the use of gender-neutral language in schools, either municipally or state-wide, since 2023. The justices analyzed an Allegation of Non-Compliance with a Fundamental Precept filed by the National LGBTI Alliance and the Brazilian Association of Homotransaffective Families during a virtual plenary session. The organizations argue that the legislation violates the fundamental rights to freedom of speech, as well as the freedom to learn and professorship, and the ban entails censorship of teachers, affecting the dignity of non-binary people — those who do not identify exclusively as male or female — by prohibiting them from using the language in which they feel most comfortable. The institutions recall Supreme Court decisions that recognized the rights of the LGBTI+ population.

=== Canada ===
University of Toronto psychology professor Jordan Peterson uploaded a video to YouTube expressing his opposition to Bill C-16 – An Act to amend the Canadian Human Rights Act and the Criminal Code, a bill introduced by Justin Trudeau's government, in October 2016. The proposed piece of legislation was to add the terms "gender identity" and "gender expression" to the Canadian Human Rights Act and to the Criminal Code's hate crimes provisions. In the video, Peterson argued that legal protection of gender pronouns results in "compelled speech", which would violate the right to freedom of expression outlined in the Canadian Charter of Rights and Freedoms. In the view of Peterson, legal pronoun protections would force an individual to say something that one opposes. The bill passed in the House of Commons and the Senate, becoming law upon receiving royal assent on 19 June 2017. In response to the passing of the bill, Peterson has stated he will not use gender-neutral pronouns if asked in the classroom by a student.

In 2026, a blood lab was ordered to pay damages for violating rights of three transgender and nonbinary patients. Staff had refused to accept any gender-neutral pronoun for their records.

=== France ===
In 2021, controversy arose in France when the dictionary Petit Robert included the gender neutral term iel – composed of il ('he') and elle ('she'). The dictionary's director, Charles Bimbenet, stated it was added as researchers noted "an increasing usage" of the neutral pronoun in "a large body of texts drawn from various sources."

Some French politicians opposed the new addition. Jean-Michel Blanquer, the French Minister of Education, tweeted: "inclusive writing is not the future of the French language." Similarly, François Jolivet, a French politician, accused the dictionary of pushing a "woke" ideology that "undermines [their] common language and its influence", in a letter addressed to the Académie Française.

=== Italy ===
The Italian language contains grammatical gender where nouns are either masculine or feminine with corresponding gendered pronouns, which differs from English in that nouns do not encode grammatical gender. For example, "tavola" (in English table) in Italian is feminine. Developing a gender-neutral option in Italian is linguistically challenging because the Italian language marks only the masculine and feminine grammatical genders: "friends" in Italian is either "amici" or "amiche" where the masculine "-i" pluralized ending is used as an all-encompassing term, and "amiche" with the feminine "-e" pluralized ending refers specifically to a group of female friends. Italian linguistically derived from Latin, which does contain a third "neuter" or neutral option.

The use of a schwa <ə> has been proposed as a means of creating a gender-neutral option in Italian. Some Italian linguists have signed a petition opposing the use of the schwa on the basis that it is not linguistically correct. Other solutions proposed are the asterisk <*>, the <x>, the at sign <@>, the <u> and omitting gender-specific suffixes altogether.

On March 21, 2025, the Italian Ministry of Education mandated that schools in the country ban the use of gender-neutral language, such as asterisks and schwa.

Studies have shown that people who identify as non-binary in Italy experience misgendering daily due to the pronoun use in Italy being "unavoidable".

=== Philippines ===
The Supreme Court of the Philippines in a 16-page judgment promulgated in October 2023, reminded "judicial officers to be circumspect in their language after it observed that both the judge and prosecutor in the case used nongender-fair language. Together, the foregoing reinforces the trope that women are out to entrap men into marriage. The disparaging language shifts the blame on the woman for marrying the unfaithful man after getting pregnant as if society did not stigmatize single mothers", Acting Chief Justice Marvic Leonen held.

=== United States ===
The American English language contains gendered connotations that make it challenging for gender-neutral language to achieve the desired linguistic equality. "Male default" is especially prominent in the United States, and often, when gender-neutral language is used around traditionally male institutions, the neutrality does not prevent people from automatically translating "they" to the default "he."

Tensions over gender-neutral language in discussions of pregnancy, such as the use of the term "pregnant people" instead of "pregnant women", have become part of the broader American culture wars.

== See also ==
=== In specific languages ===
- Gender neutrality in languages with grammatical gender
  - Gender neutrality in English
  - Gender neutrality in Spanish
  - Gender neutrality in Portuguese
- Gender star

=== Related topics ===
- Bias-free communication
- Epicenity
- Gender in Bible translation
- Gender binary
- Gender neutrality
- Gender role
- Genderless language
- Generic antecedent
- Inclusive language
- International Gender and Language Association, an interdisciplinary academic organization
- Markedness
- Non-binary gender
- Unisex name
- Gender neutrality in languages with gendered third-person pronouns
- Pronoun game
- Feminist language reform
- Lavender linguistics
- Gender marking in job titles
