= Epicenity =

Quality of a word with identical female and male forms

Epicenity is the lack of gender distinction, often reducing the emphasis on the masculine to allow the feminine. It includes androgyny—having both masculine and feminine characteristics. The adjective gender-neutral may describe epicenity (and both terms are associated with the terms gender-neutral language, gender-neutral pronouns, gender-blind, and unisex).

== In linguistics ==
An epicene word has the same form for male and for female referents. In some cases, the term common gender is also used, but should not be confused with common or appellative as a contrary to proper (as in proper noun). In English, for example, the epicene (or common) nouns cousin and violinist can refer to a man or a woman, and so can the epicene (or common) pronoun one. The noun stewardess and the third-person singular pronoun she on the other hand are not epicene (or common).

In languages with grammatical gender, the term epicene can be used in two distinct situations:

- The same word can refer to either masculine or feminine signified concept, while retaining its own, either masculine or feminine, grammatical gender. For example, Classical Greek λαγώς (lagṓs) 'hare' is masculine, but can refer to male and female hares (he-hares and she-hares), and ἀλώπηξ (alṓpēks) 'fox' is feminine, but can refer to male and female foxes (he-foxes and she-foxes). For this meaning, the term common gender is different from epicene gender.
- An article, noun, adjective, or pronoun has identical masculine and feminine forms, but they do not follow always one agreement pattern.

=== In French ===
In the French language, the noun élève 'schoolchild' and the adjective espiègle 'mischievous' can be either masculine or feminine, but they are differentiated by the article:

un élève espiègle (masculine)	'a mischievous schoolboy' (or in some cases 'a mischievous schoolchild' when gender is unknown)
une élève espiègle (feminine)	'a mischievous schoolgirl'

The same can happen in French with the epicene elided singular articles (l'), the definite (les) and indefinite (des) plural articles, and the contractions aux (à + les) and des (de + les) when in contact with the noun, so the adjective takes the task of marking the gender:

les adultes français (masculine)	'the French male adults' or 'the French adults [of any gender]'
les adultes françaises (feminine)	'the French female adults'

For these meanings the term common is also used.

However, there can be cases where the agreement cannot force the disambiguation, even with the presence of pronoun, article, noun and adjective when they are all epicene:

moi, l'élève moldave (masculine or feminine)	'I, the Moldavian student'

This can be further complicated when dealing with spoken French (when some orthographical nuances are lost).

=== In Spanish ===
In the Spanish language, there are very few cases where a noun ignores the semantic gender of the referent. For example, the noun persona 'person' is grammatically feminine, and only takes any supporting article or adjective in agreement with this gender.

la persona (masculine)	'the person'
la persona (feminine)	'the person'

As the gender of the referent of an epicene is ambiguous it may be necessary to add an adjective to clarify, but the gender of this adjective will also be in agreement with the epicene, for example in the case of the noun víctima 'victim' which is also an epicene.

la víctima masculina (masculine)	'the male victim'
la víctima femenina (feminine)	'the female victim'

In Portuguese, the same happens, however the word sobrecomum (lit. 'overcommon') is often distinguished from epiceno when referring to nouns specifically. For example, the word cobra is considered epicene while the word criança (child) is sobrecomum, while words such as alface or rádio are considered of double gender or vacillant, something that is denominated ambiguous gender in Spanish, similar to the term unstable gender in French.

== See also ==
- Singular they
- Gender marking in job titles
- Gender neutrality in English
- Gender neutrality in Spanish
- Generic antecedent
- Male as norm
- Unisex name
- Neopronoun, nonstandard English pronouns which sometimes describe epicenity.
- Episkyros, etymology
- Feminization of language
