= Gender neutrality in genderless languages =

Lack of requirement for morphological agreement with respect to gender in some languages

A genderless language is a natural or constructed language that has no distinctions of grammatical gender—that is, no categories requiring morphological agreement between nouns and associated pronouns, adjectives, articles, or verbs.

The notion of a genderless language is distinct from that of gender neutrality or gender-neutral language, which is wording that does not presuppose a particular natural gender. A discourse in a grammatically genderless language is not necessarily gender-neutral, although genderless languages exclude many possibilities for reinforcement of gender-related stereotypes, as they still include words with gender-specific meanings (such as "son" and "daughter"), and may include gender distinctions among pronouns (such as "he" and "she").

== Indo-European languages ==
=== Armenian ===
In Armenian, neither pronouns nor nouns have grammatical gender. The third-person pronoun նա (na) means both he and she, and նրանք (nranq) is for they.

=== Bengali ===
Bengali has the gender neutral pronoun সে; for indicating both he and she. Bengali verbs do not change from the subject's gender. Some Bengali nouns have separate words for masculine and feminine genders, although in modern Bengali people are encouraged to use gender neutral (often masculine-only) word forms.

=== English ===
English lacks grammatical gender, but can be considered to have a pronominal gender system with semantic gender represented in the pronouns. This system of gender is quite minimal compared to languages with grammatical gender.

Historically, "he" referred to a generic person whose gender is unspecified in formal language, but the gender-neutral singular they has long been common in informal language, and is becoming increasingly so in formal language. The use of the neuter pronoun "it" is most commonly used in reference to non-personified objects and animals rather than for people.

=== Persian ===
Persian is a gender-free language. In contrast to most other Indo-European languages, Persian is grammatically gender-neutral. It does not distinguish between masculine, feminine or neuter genders. Arabic loanwords with the feminine ending ـة reduce to a genderless Persian ـه, which is pronounced -a in Arabic, as well as in Early New Persian (ENP), Classical Persian and Modern Afghan Persian (i.e., Dari) and -e in Modern Iranian Persian. Many borrowed Arabic feminine words retain their Arabic feminine plural form ـات (-āt), but Persian descriptive adjectives modifying them have no gender. Arabic adjectives also lose their gender in Persian.

For example, the word او (-ō) means "he or she" and does not determine the gender of the person. All of the grammatical rules in Persian are gender-free.

== Non-Indo-European languages ==
=== Basque ===
The Basque language is largely gender-free. Most nouns have no gender, though there are different words for females and males in some cases (ama, "mother"; aita, "father"; guraso, "parent"). Some words are differentiated according to gender, like in the English language (aktoresa, "actress"; aktore, "actor"), but they are not the main rule. For animals, there are particles (oil+o, "hen"; oil+ar, "cock"; hartz eme, "female bear"; hartz arra, "male bear") or different words (behi, "cow"; zezen, "bull").

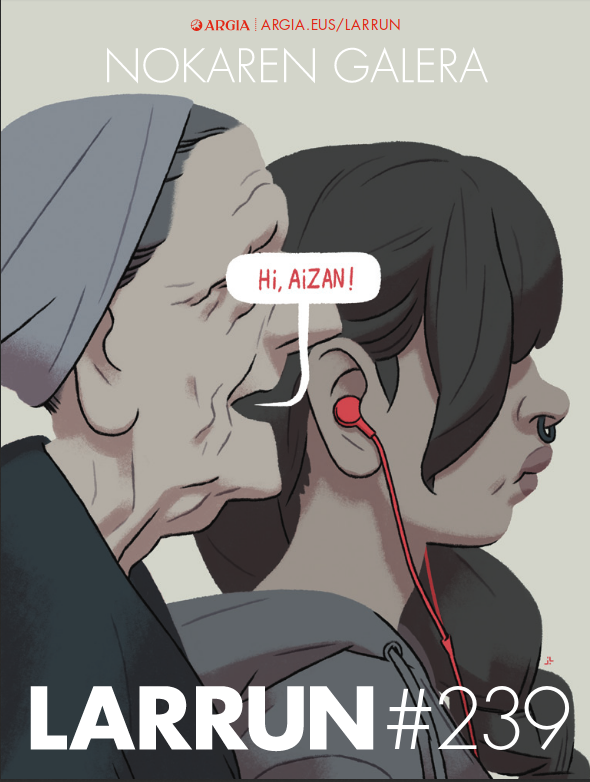
2019 Argia magazine cover about the loss of noka (feminine hika). Hi, aizan! means "Thou [female], hear!".

While there are no gender-specific pronouns, in some dialects, Basque verbs can agree allocutively with the gender in the intimate singular second person (This is a mark of solidarity, providing no information since the listeners already know their genders.): hik dun, "you (female) have it"; hik duk, "you (male) have it". The verb is marked for addressee's gender, if they are intimate singular, whether or not they are referred to in the clause. In earlier stages, the relation between hik and zuk was like that of you and thou in early modern English. Most Basque speakers already avoid hi as too disrespectful, and its use has been diminishing. In practice, the hika forms are more frequent when addressing males than females. A perception developed that associates hika to spontaneity, peasantness, directness, values linked to Basque rural males, while the formal forms are used by women. It has been explained as a consequence of the rural exodus of Basque peasants. Men would become workers in a factory with other men from their town. Females would become maids, waitresses, shop clerks where informal Basque would be felt improper. When institutions have tried to nuance closeness in their public communications, the male forms have been chosen.

Non-sexism supporters propose substituting those forms by the more formal ones: zuk duzu "you have it". Recently, some Basque feminists have tried to revive the use of hika forms among women.

=== Finnish ===
Finnish, like most other Uralic languages, is mostly a gender-neutral language. Pronouns lack grammatical gender, with "hän" as the sole third-person singular pronoun. However, there are examples of androcentrism in many Finnish terms with person reference, e.g. masculine expressions being used in a generic manner to refer to both sexes. They can be compounds (e.g. palomies lit. fireman, fire fighter), derivatives (e.g. veljeillä < veli lit. brother, to fraternize), phrases such as uskottu mies (trustee, executor, administrator), idioms (e.g. olla oma herransa, to be one's own master), and proverbs (e.g. auta miestä mäessä, älä mäen alla; help a man on the hill, not under the hill).

With the rise of gender neutrality, many compound words have been converted to gender-neutral forms. This can be done with several strategies:

- Replacing the word mies (man) with ''henkilö'' (person), e.g. esimies (lit. foreman) becomes esihenkilö (foreperson).
- Replacing the word mies with työntekijä (worker), e.g. varastomies (lit. warehouse man) becomes varastotyöntekijä (warehouse worker).
- Adding the suffix -ja to refer to a person doing the verb's action, e.g. johtomies (lit. lead man) becomes johtaja (leader).

=== Georgian ===
In Georgian, neither pronouns nor nouns have grammatical gender. The third person pronoun "ის"(is) means he, she or it.

=== Pulaar ===
Pulaar lacks gender pronouns such as he/she. For example sentence "Himo He Jam" means (He/She is good). Pulaar either bends verbs and removes the pronoun all together, or uses gender neutral "Himo".

=== Swahili ===
Swahili is a Bantu language spoken in many parts of Africa such as Kenya and Tanzania. It is largely gender neutral in specific nouns. Words such as actor/actress (mwigaji wa hadithi) and waiter/waitress (mtumishi mezani) are gender neutral among most others in the language. The words he, him, she, her translate to a single word in Swahili, yeye.

There are gender specific words for man/woman (mwanamume/mwanamke) and mother/father (mama/baba), so it is not completely gender neutral, although a vast majority of the words do not distinguish between male or female. The language does not have a grammatical gender either.

=== Tagalog ===
Tagalog, like most Austronesian languages, is a genderless language. The third-person pronoun siya is used for both "he" and "she", as well as "it" in the context of being a neuter gender. Native nouns also feature this characteristic, normally with the addition of lalaki ("male") or babae ("female") to the noun to signify gender in terms such as anak na lalaki ("son") or babaeng kambing ("she-goat").

However, because Tagalog has had over three centuries of Spanish influence, gender is usually differentiated in certain Spanish loanwords by way of the suffixes -a (feminine) and -o (masculine). These words mostly refer to ethnicities, occupations, and family. Some examples are: Pilipina/Pilipino (Filipina/o) and their derivative nicknames Pinay/Pinoy, tindera/tindero (vendor), inhinyera/inhinyero (engineer), tita/tito (aunt/uncle), manang/manong (elder sister/brother), and lola/lolo (grandmother/grandfather). A few gender-differentiating pairs originate from Chinese, mostly relating to kinship terminology such as ate (big sister) and kuya (big brother).

The gender neutral term 'Filipinx' has gained popularity especially among Filipino-Americans as a demonym or an adjective. Since then it has been controversial, with Filipinos living in the Philippines arguing that the term 'Filipino' is already genderless. While the word is borrowed from Spanish where suffixes indicate gender, the term borrowed into Tagalog is already used in a gender-neutral manner. The coined term is said to be unnecessary and that it imposes eurocentric standards in the language.

=== Turkish ===
Turkish is a gender-neutral language, like most other Turkic languages. Nouns have a generic form and this generic form is used for both males and females. For example, doktor (doctor), eczacı (pharmacist), mühendis (engineer) etc. Very few words for person reference contain a clue to the gender of the referred person, such as anne/baba "mother/father", kız/oğlan "girl/boy", hanım/bey "lady/sir". The third person singular pronoun "o" refers to "he", "she" and "it".

At the same time research has shown a significant presence of semantically implied gender (covert gender) in Turkish. In addition to the absence of semantic gender neutrality it was also noted that the usage of gender markings in Turkish is asymmetrical. In translations of sentences from English texts where the gender is evident (e.g., usage of he/she or male vs. female context) it was noticed that feminine gender was marked in 50% of cases, while masculine was marked only in 5% of cases. While translations are not typically representative of linguistic data, similar asymmetry was also observed in Turkish literary and newspaper texts.

=== Varieties of Chinese ===
Sinitic languages (or topolects) are largely gender-neutral. Chinese has no inflections for gender, tense, or case, so comprehension is almost wholly dependent on word order. There are also very few, if any, derivational inflections; instead, the language relies heavily on compounding to create new words. A Chinese word is thus inherently gender-neutral, and any given word can be preceded by an morpheme indicating masculinity or femininity. For example, the word for "doctor" is yīshēng (Traditional: 醫生, Simplified: 医生). To specify the gender of the doctor, the speaker can add the morpheme for "male" or "female" to the front of it. Thus, to specify a male doctor, one would prefix nán 男 (male), as in nányīshēng (男醫生/男医生); to specify a female doctor, one would prefix nǚ 女 (female), as in nǚyīshēng (女醫生/女医生). Under normal circumstances, both male and female doctors would simply be referred to as yīshēng (醫生/医生).

==== Mandarin ====
Spoken Mandarin Chinese also has only one third-person singular pronoun, tā for all referents. Tā can mean "he" (also "He" for deities, written differently), "she", or "it". However, the different meanings of tā are written with different characters: "他", containing the human radical "亻", from "人", meaning person, for he or a person of undetermined gender; "她", containing the feminine radical "女", for "she"; and "它" for "it"; "祂" containing the spirit radical "礻", from "示", for deities; "牠" containing the cow radical "牜", from "牛", for animals.

The character for "she", containing the "woman" radical (glyphic element of a character's composition), was invented in the early twentieth century due to western influence; prior to this, the character indicating "he" today was used for both genders: it contains the "person" radical, which, as noted above, is not gender-specific.

==== Cantonese ====
In Cantonese, the third-person singular pronoun is keui^{5}, written as 佢; it may refer to people of any gender because Cantonese does not have gendered third-person pronouns as in English. Replacing the "亻" radical with "女" (in pronoun 佢) forms the character 姖, has a separate meaning in written Cantonese.

== See also ==
- Gender marking in job titles
- Gender neutrality in languages with grammatical gender
- IGALA (International Gender and Language Association)

== Bibliography ==
- Grünberg, A. L. (1999). "Zemiaki jazyk/dialekt". In Edelman, D. I. (ed.). Jazyki mira: Dardskie i nuristanskie jazyki (in Russian). Moscow: Indrik. pp. 123–125. ISBN 585759085X.
