= The Handbook of Nonsexist Writing =

Style guide

- Title page for The Handbook of Nonsexist Writing (1980)
- Author: Casey Miller; Kate Swift
- Language: English
- Genre: Non-fiction
- Publisher: Harper & Row, Publishers, Inc
- Publication date: 1980

The Handbook of Nonsexist Writing: For writers, editors, and speakers was first published in 1980 by Casey Miller and Kate Swift. It was the second book produced by the two in an effort to raise awareness of issues concerning gender in the English language.

== "Man as a False Generic" ==
The first section of the handbook is entitled "Man as a False Generic." False generics are defined as "terms used of a class or group that are not applicable to all its members." A brief history of the subject describes the origin of 'man' to mean "person" or "human being," but observes that this broad definition of 'man' was becoming questionable in the 1980s. "Because gender in modern English corresponds to sex or its absence, native speakers of the language increasingly sense the same contradiction in calling women 'men' that they would feel in calling girls 'boys' or daughters 'sons.'"

They give the following as an example for where the generic use of 'man' is not applicable: "One author, ostensibly generalizing about all human beings, wrote: 'As for man, he is no different from the rest. His back aches, he ruptures easily, his women have difficulties in childbirth...' If man and he were truly generic, the parallel phrase would have been "he has difficulties in childbirth."

Swift and Miller offer a list of substitute titles for words including man such as 'salesman' or 'fisherman.' They also suggest using synonyms for words that refer to gender, such as 'man the station,' and so on.

== "The Pronoun Problem" ==
This section goes into detail about the history and problems that arise from using male pronouns as generic pronouns (i.e. "he," "him," and "his"). They offer this section from a New York Times response to an article in support of gendered pronouns to be used generically:

"Knowing that he and his can be gender neutral, I shall no longer feel there is an odd image filtering through something like: 'The average American needs the small routines of getting ready for work. As he shaves or blow-dries his hair or pulls on his panty hose, he is easing himself by small stages into the demands of the day.'...How liberating common sense can be."

As a solution to this issue of pronouns, Swift and Miller suggest using 'they' in place of a gendered pronoun, or specifically stating "he or she/his or hers" as a substitute for just the male pronoun.

== "Generalizations" ==
The 'Generalizations' section describes the reverse of the 'Pronoun Problem' - it is when gender neutral terms are assumed to be gender specific. Often, the gender assumed is male. This section also describes problems with the use of female-gendered words in ways that are condescending, but may not be intentional. As an example, they offer this statement about a fictional television show: "Powerful lady attorney and confident young lawyer team up to defend a wealthy contractor accused of murder."

Using "lady" in this way implies that the 'confident young lawyer' and the 'wealthy contractor' are both male, and also suggests that a woman needs to be explicitly described as powerful. They go on to urge that qualifiers not be used with just women, and instead suggest that the above statement read:

"Powerful attorney and her young male colleague team up to defend a wealthy businessman accused of murder."

== Other ideas/topics ==
The Handbook includes suggestions on how to avoid sexist language. The recurring theme is using inclusive language that is not gender biased. Miller and Swift offer a historical account of how language norms have developed in the English language, and then suggest alternatives that do not make gender assumptions.

"A Few More Words" is a chapter that includes in depth case studies on specific words such as "Feminist," "Hero/Heroine," and "Midwife." These sections offer a detailed history of specific words and phrases, and put them in gendered context.

The Handbook also contains a brief thesaurus of terms to use in place of terms that are not gender neutral. Examples include 'married woman' instead of 'matron' and 'person/individual' instead of 'man' when meant to mean "person."

== Influence ==
Casey Miller and Kate Swift have been advocating for gender-inclusive language since the early 1970s, when they wrote the essay, "Desexing the English Language." Their intent in The Handbook of Nonsexist Writing was "to give people the background, to make them aware of what was happening right underneath their noses...we didn’t want to tell people, Do This or Don’t Do That!” Due in large part to their work on the topic, by 1980 when The Handbook of Nonsexist Writing was written the movement supporting non-sexist language was gaining traction.

Nearly 20 years after its publication, the Handbook was still considered the standard reference book on how to avoid degrading women with words. It is used as an example of unbiased review on the topic of gendered and sexist language.

== See also ==
- Language and gender
- Gender neutrality in English
- Gender-neutral language
