= Gender star =

Style for gender-neutral written German

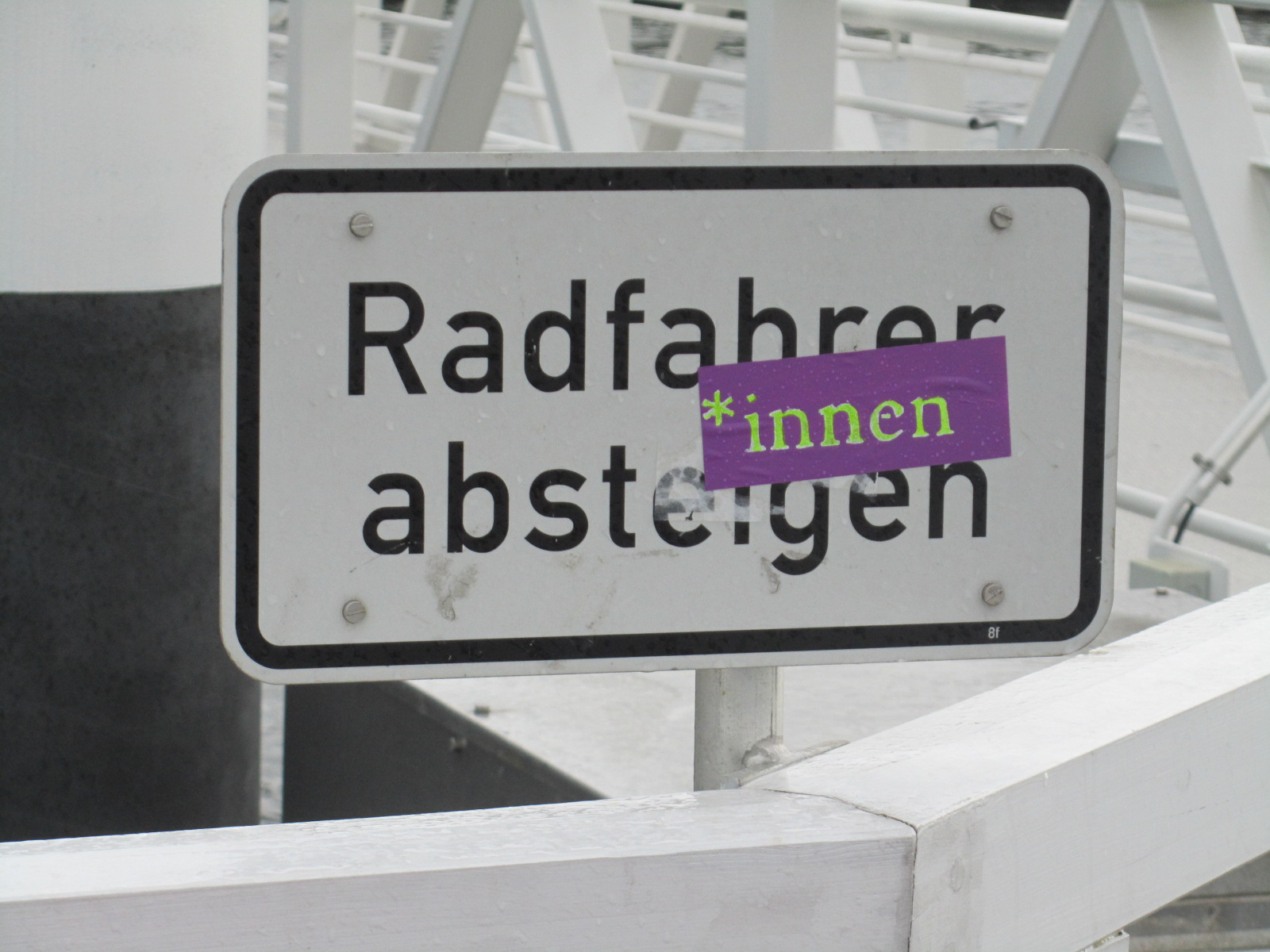
This sign, reading Radfahrer absteigen (Cyclists, dismount), has been amended with a gender star to make it gender-neutral.

The gender star (German: Genderstern, or diminutive Gendersternchen; lit. 'gender asterisk') is a nonstandard typographic style used by some authors in gender-neutral language in German.

It is formed by placing an asterisk after the stem and appending the feminine plural suffix "-innen". For example, Fahrer ([male] driver, singular & plural) becomes Fahrer*innen (drivers). The gender star makes it possible to refer to all genders while also including non-binary people.

In speech, the gender star is sometimes signalled by a glottal stop.

Alternatives to the gender star include Binnen-I (with medial capital I), the gender gap (where an underscore takes the place of the asterisk) or using inherently gender neutral terms, such as 'people' instead of 'man' or 'woman'.

The gender star was named the German Anglicism of the Year in 2018 by the Leibniz-Institut für Deutsche Sprache.

== Usage ==
In 2009, the use of the gender star was proposed by Beatrice Fischer and Michaela Wolf of the Centre for Translation Science at the University of Vienna, as an alternative to the gender gap.

The gender star was initially primarily used in universities. In 2012 it was recommended in a guide published by the Fachhochschule Potsdam (Potsdam University of Applied Sciences). In 2013 the Free University of Berlin also recommended its use, as did the University of Cologne in 2014.

It began to spread beyond its use in universities from 2015 onwards, such as in public bodies and government institutions. The gender star has also been used by the German Green Party since 2015, and the Berlin Senate since 2017.

== Response ==
In 2019, Christiane Hohenstein of the Zurich University of Applied Sciences/ZHAW was asked in an interview if she thought the gender star was a good solution to include not only male and female but also non-binary identities. She responded positively, comparing its use to how the asterisk symbol is used in database queries and praising its ability to express greater inclusivity.

Also in 2019, the German Language Association (Verein Deutsche Sprache; VDS) launched a petition against the use of the gender star, saying it was a "destructive intrusion" into the German language and created "ridiculous linguistic structures". It was signed by over 100 writers and scholars.

Luise F. Pusch, a German feminist linguist, criticises the gender star as it still makes women the 'second choice' by the use of the feminine suffix. Pusch prefers the use of the Binnen-I, which she describes as the established feminist solution to the problem.

In 2020, the Gesellschaft für deutsche Sprache (GfdS) declared Gendersternchen to be one of the 10 German Words of the Year. The GfdS does not recommend the use of the gender star, however, saying in 2021 that although it supports inclusive language when it is understandable, readable and conforms to language rules, it does not believe the gender star fulfils these criteria.

In 2023, the state of Saxony banned the use of gender stars and gender gaps in schools and education, which marks students' use of the gender stars as incorrect. In March 2024, Bavaria banned gender-neutral language in schools, universities and several other public authorities. In April 2024, Hesse banned the use of gender neutral language, including gender stars, in administrative language.

In 2024, voters in the city of Zurich voted against an initiative that aimed to ban the use of the gender star in government documents. The initiative campaign was led by Cantonal Councillor Susanne Brunner of the SVP.

== See also ==
- Asterisk
- Feminist language reform
- Gender-neutral pronoun
- Gender neutrality in languages with grammatical gender
- Gender role in language
- German orthography
- German nouns
- Grammatical gender in German
- Language and gender
- Language and thought
- Latinx
- Lavender linguistics
- Sapir-Whorf hypothesis
- Wildcard character
- Women's studies
