= Casey Miller =

American feminist author and editor

Casey Geddes Miller
- Born: February 26, 1919; Toledo, Ohio, US
- Died: January 5, 1997 (aged 77); East Haddam, Connecticut, US
- Known for: Author
- Notable work: The Handbook of Nonsexist Writing: For Writers, Editors and Speakers; Words and Women

Casey Geddes Miller (February 26, 1919 – January 5, 1997) was an American feminist author and editor best known for promoting the use of non-sexist writing in the English language. With Kate Swift, her business partner and platonic domestic partner, she wrote influential books and articles about sexism in the English language.

== Biography ==
Casey Miller was born in Toledo, Ohio, on February 26, 1919, to Walter and Laura Miller. By 1930 her father had died and her mother and sisters moved from Perrysburg, Ohio, to New York City. She attended Smith College in Northampton, Massachusetts, graduating with a Bachelor of Arts Philosophy in 1940. She also studied graphic arts at Yale University. During the Second World War, Miller was commissioned as a lieutenant in the United States Navy and served for three years in the Office of Naval Intelligence in Washington, D.C. While there, she was involved in war-time cryptography and "helped to break codes used by Japanese" in the Pacific Ocean theatre of World War II.

After the war's conclusion, she moved to Colonial Williamsburg in Virginia where she worked from 1947 to 1954 in the landmark's publication department. She became the curriculum editor of Seabury Press Inc. and 10 years later moved to Greenwich, Connecticut, to work as a freelance editor from her home. A few years later, Miller moved to East Haddam, Connecticut, in 1967 and began a writing partnership with Kate Swift, which lasted until Miller's death.

Throughout her life, Miller was an active philanthropist. She served as a foster parent for dozens of children and donated generously to Smith College, Planned Parenthood, and NAACP. in 1977, Miller became an associate of the Women's Institute for Freedom of the Press (WIFP). WIFP is an American nonprofit publishing organization. The organization works to increase communication between women and connect the public with forms of women-based media.

== Writing career ==
Miller formed a professional editing partnership with Kate Swift, the director of the news bureau of the Yale University's School of Medicine, in 1970. Soon after, Miller and Swift were asked to copy-edit a sex education manual for junior high school students with the intended goal of encouraging mutual respect and equality between female and male students. However, the original text of the pamphlet continually used masculine personal pronouns such as "he" so that it was unclear whether the manual's original author was writing about both males and females or males alone. The use of masculine pronouns to refer to both male and females undermined the stated goal of establishing equality between the students. Swift later said, "We suddenly realized what was keeping [the author's] message - his good message - from getting across, and it hit us like a bombshell," in a 1994 interview for the National Council of Teachers of English. She went on to say, "It was the pronouns! They were overwhelmingly masculine-gendered." Miller and Swift realized that masculine nouns in English are often used to generalize both male and females, often to the point of ignoring females. This led to Miller and Swift to wage what The New York Times would later call "a forceful campaign against what many considered sexist language."

=== "Desexing the English Language" ===
After this realization, Miller and Swift began to explore and promote awareness of the ways in which the English language is gender biased towards men. The next year, Miller and Swift published an article titled "Desexing the English Language" in the inaugural issue of the magazine Ms., which had been run as an insert in the New York Magazine on December 6, 1971. Swift would later remark that the public response to this article received both praise and ridicule. Soon after, in April 1972, they went on to publish "One Small Step for Genkind" in The New York Times Magazine. Other articles were eventually published in The Washington Post and, over the years, in many additional national periodicals.

=== Words and Women ===
Miller and Swift's work culminated in their publishing of the book Words and Women in 1976 by Doubleday, which Women's Media Center called "a world-changing book."

=== The Handbook of Nonsexist Writing ===
In 1980 Miller and Swift wrote The Handbook of Nonsexist Writing and had it published by Lippincott & Crowell and in 1988 by HarperCollins. Senator Chris Dodd later said that this handbook is "still considered the standard reference guide on how to correctly utilize language in order to properly address and speak of women."

== Legacy ==
Because of their efforts, the Hartford Courant later titled Miller and Swift as "leaders in the women's movement of the 1970s" and a duo who "took on the pronoun he [...] along with the rest of what they and other feminists considered male-biased language in countless articles and speeches as well as in their books." Eventually people became aware of the "implicit discrimination in" the English language and "writing and speaking without using masculine-gender words" began to catch on. Furthermore, some of Miller and Swift's actual proposals for non sexist language eventually found their way into everyday usage. For example, according to the St. Paul Pioneer Press, "Some of the authors' proposals gained traction. Many newspapers, textbooks and public speakers avoid "fireman" and "stewardess" nowadays."

Miller died on January 5, 1997, at age 77 of chronic obstructive lung disease in Middletown, Connecticut. Upon her death, Senator Chris Dodd of Connecticut entered a "Tribute to Casey Miller" into the U.S. Senate's Congressional Record. She was buried in Madison, Connecticut, and was later joined by her partner, Kate Swift, upon Swift's death in 2011.

Casey Miller's and Kate Swift's personal papers and records are kept in the Special Collections and University Archives at the University of Oregon in Eugene, Oregon.

== See also ==
- Kate Swift
- The Handbook of Nonsexist Writing
- Language and gender
- Gender-neutral language
- Gender neutrality in English
