= Kate Swift =

American writer (1923–2011)

Kate Swift (December 9, 1923 – May 7, 2011) was an American feminist writer and editor who co-wrote (with Casey Miller, her business partner and platonic domestic partner) influential books and articles about sexism in the English language.

== Writing career ==
Casey Miller moved to East Haddam, Connecticut in 1967 and began a writing partnership with Swift, which lasted until Miller's death.

Miller formed a professional editing partnership with Swift, who was at the time the director of the news bureau of the Yale University's School of Medicine, in 1970. Soon after, Swift and Miller were asked to copy-edit a sex education manual for junior high school students with the intended goal of encouraging mutual respect and equality between female and male students. However, the original text of the pamphlet continually used masculine personal pronouns such as "he" so that it was unclear whether the manual's original author was writing about both males and females or males alone. The use of masculine pronouns to refer to both male and females undermined the stated goal of establishing equality between the students. Swift later said, "We suddenly realized what was keeping [the author's] message - his good message - from getting across, and it hit us like a bombshell," in a 1994 interview for the National Council of Teachers of English. She went on to say, "It was the pronouns! They were overwhelmingly masculine-gendered." Swift and Miller realized that masculine nouns in English are often used to generalize both male and females, often to the point of ignoring females. This led Swift and Miller to wage what The New York Times would later call "a forceful campaign against what many considered sexist language."

=== "Desexing the English Language" ===
After this realization, Swift and Miller began to explore and promote awareness of the ways in which the English Language is gender biased towards men. The next year, Swift and Miller published an article titled "Desexing the English Language" in the inaugural issue of the magazine Ms., which had been run as an insert in the New York Magazine on December 6, 1971. Swift would later remark that the public response to this article received both praise and ridicule. Soon after, in April 1972, they went on to publish "One Small Step for Genkind" in The New York Times Magazine. Other articles were eventually published in The Washington Post and, over the years, in many additional national periodicals.

=== Words and Women ===
Swift and Miller's work culminated in their publishing of the book Words and Women in 1976 by Doubleday, which Women's Media Center called "a world-changing book".

=== The Handbook of Nonsexist Writing ===
In 1980 Swift and Miller wrote The Handbook of Nonsexist Writing and had it published by Lippincott & Crowell and in 1988 by HarperCollins. Senator Chris Dodd later said that this handbook is "still considered the standard reference guide on how to correctly use language in order to properly address and speak of women."

== Activism ==
In 1977, Swift became an associate of the Women's Institute for Freedom of the Press (WIFP).

== Burial ==
Miller was buried in Madison, Connecticut and was later joined by Swift, upon Swift's own death in 2011.

== Legacy ==
Because of their efforts, the Hartford Courant later titled Swift and Miller as "leaders in the women's movement of the 1970s" and a duo who "took on the pronoun he [...] along with the rest of what they and other feminists considered male-biased language in countless articles and speeches as well as in their books." Eventually people became aware of the "implicit discrimination in" the English language and "writing and speaking without using masculine-gender words" began to catch on. Furthermore, some of Swift and Miller's actual proposals for non sexist language eventually found their way into everyday usage. For example, according to the St. Paul Pioneer Press, "Some of the authors' proposals gained traction. Many newspapers, textbooks and public speakers avoid "fireman" and "stewardess" nowadays."

Swift and Miller's personal papers and records are kept in the Special Collections and University Archives at the University of Oregon in Eugene, Oregon.

== Sources ==
- The Times Record
