= Spivak pronoun =

Set of gender-neutral pronouns in English

The Spivak pronouns 'e/em/eir' are a set of gender-neutral pronouns in English promoted on the virtual community LambdaMOO based on pronouns used in a book by American mathematician Michael Spivak. Though not in widespread use (according to the 2025 Gender Census, 8.3% of gender-diverse identifying people are happy to be called by some version of Spivak pronouns), they have been employed in writing for gender-neutral language by those who wish to avoid the standard terms he, she, or singular they.

== History ==
The precise history of the Spivak pronouns is unclear, since they appear to have been independently created multiple times.

The first recorded use of the pronouns was in a January 1890 editorial by James Rogers, who derives e, es, and em from he and them in response to the proposed thon. Coincidentally, Scottish author David Lindsay used the similar forms ae and aer in his novel A Voyage to Arcturus, to refer to non-terrestrial beings "unmistakably of a third positive sex".

In 1975, Christine M. Elverson of Skokie, Illinois, won a contest by the Chicago Association of Business Communicators to find replacements for "she and he", "him and her", and "his and hers". Her pronouns ey, em, and eir were formed by dropping the "th" from they, them, and their. (See 'em.) The article that first reported the pronouns treated them as something of a joke, concluding with the line, "A contestant from California entered the word 'uh' because 'if it isn't a he or a she, it's uh, something else.' So much of eir humor."

Writing in 1977, poet, playwright, and linguist Lillian Carlton submitted a letter to the journal American Speech reporting (and arguing against) the invention by "an American professor" (likely Donald MacKay) of pronouns based on "the long sound of the vowel e" (i.e. /iː/). Although her primary argument against the proposed word is her assertion that English "already [has] a perfectly good... word that refers to either sex", namely "one", she also raises the observations that "spoken fast, it comes uncomfortably close to the illiterate hisself... [Furthermore], ee sounds too much like he and would therefore be confusing." Similar arguments, along with the desire to distance themselves from the male-centric singular he and derivatives, are still a primary factor in the proliferation of constructed pronouns.

Also in 1977, Jeffery J. Smith, Emeritus Professor of Philosophy and Humanities at Stanford University, writing under the pen name "Tintajl jefry", proposed "Em" as "a personal noun-pronoun which in itself gives no indication of sex, age, or number, though these may be shown by its context." He proposes a vast number of possible uses for "em", including but not limited to the replacement of "the formal Dear, because em is a thou word, a term of respect for all people, bar none... Dear Em Doe is redundant. Em Doe is enough, and, since it is brief; it makes room for given names: Em John Doe, Em Mary and John Doe, or, better, Em Doe John, Em Doe John and Mary."

The May 1980 issue of American Psychologist reported on another study by MacKay, testing rates at which subjects miscomprehended the gender of a subject in textbook paragraphs when written with he meaning he or she compared with three epicene pronoun sets: E, E, Es, Eself; e, e, es, eself; and tey, tem, ter, temself.

In 1983, mathematician Michael Spivak wrote the AMS-TeX manual The Joy of TEX: A Gourmet Guide to Typesetting with the AMS-TEX Macro Package (1986) using E, Em, and Eir. His set was similar to Elverson's, but capitalized like one of MacKay's sets.

In May 1991, a MOO programmer, Roger Crew, added "spivak" as a gender setting for players on LambdaMOO, causing the game to refer to such players with the pronouns e, em, eir, eirs, emself. The setting was added along with several other "fake genders" in order to test changes to the software's pronoun code, and was left in place as a novelty. To Crew's surprise, the Spivak setting caught on among the game's players, while the other gender settings were mostly ignored.

Other writers applied Elverson's original "th"-dropping rule and revived ey, such as Eric Klein in his legal code for a planned micronation called Oceania. John Williams's Gender-neutral Pronoun FAQ (2004) promoted the original Elverson set (via Klein) as preferable to other major contenders popular on Usenet (singular they, sie/hir/hir/hirs/hirself, and zie/zir/zir/zirs/zirself).

== Variations ==
Three variants of the Spivak pronouns are in use, Rogers (1890), Elverson (1975), and LambdaMOO (1991), highlighted in the declension table below. The pronoun set used by Lindsay (1920) is also in use, although generally not in the context of Spivak pronouns.

Declension table for Spivak pronoun variants
Variant	Subject	Object	Possessive adjective	Possessive pronoun	Reflexive
Masculine	he laughs	I hugged him	his heart warmed	that is his	he loves himself
Feminine	she laughs	I hugged her	her heart warmed	that is hers	she loves herself
Singular they	they laugh	I hugged them	their heart warmed	that is theirs	they love themself
Rogers (1890)	e laughs	I hugged em	es heart warmed		
Lindsay (1920)	ae laughs	I hugged aer	aer heart warmed	that is *aers	ae loves *aerself
Elverson (1975)	ey laughs	I hugged em	eir heart warmed	that is eirs	ey loves emself
"anti-Carlton" (1977)	ee laughs		*ees heart warmed	that is *ees	ee loves eeself
Tintajl (1977)	em laughs	I hugged em	ems heart warmed	that is ems	em loves emself
MacKay (1980)	E laughs	I hugged E	Es heart warmed		
Spivak (1983) (Note: The Joy of TeX uses "E", "Em", and "Eir", always capitalized.)	E laughs	I hugged Em	Eir heart warmed		
LambdaMOO "spivak" (1991) (Note: From 1998 through 2011, LambdaMOO's "help spivak" output described the spivak set as "E – subject", "Em – objective", "Eir – possessive (adjective)", "Eirs – possessive (noun)" and "Emself – reflexive".)	e laughs	I hugged em	eir heart warmed	that is eirs	e loves emself

The original ey has been argued to be preferable to e, because the latter would be pronounced the same as he in those contexts where he, him, his loses its h sound.

== Usage ==
Spivak is one of the allowable genders on many multi-user dungeons (MUDs) and MOOs (MUD object-oriented). Others might include some selection of: masculine, feminine, neuter, either, both, "splat", plural, egotistical, royal, and second. The selected gender determines how the game engine refers to a player.

On LambdaMOO, they became standard practice for help texts ("The user may choose any description e likes"), referring to people of unknown gender ("Who was that guest yesterday, eir typing was terrible"), referring to people whose gender was known but without disclosing it ("Yes I've met Squiggle. E was nice."), or of course characters declaring themselves to be of gender Spivak. Since 2000 this usage has been declining.

Nomic games, especially on the Internet, often use Spivak pronouns in their rulesets, as a way to refer to indefinite players.

=== Spivak pronouns and gender in virtual communities ===
In online anonymous situations, Spivak and other gender neutral pronouns can be motivated by avoiding gendered speech that would make divisions in the social group more likely and the group possibly less productive or enjoyable. This contact with genderless pronouns in virtual communities is sometimes a person's first experience and experimentation with presenting their gender in a genderqueer or transgender manner.

=== Publications employing Spivak pronouns ===
==== Elverson 1975 set (ey, em, eir) ====
- Carter, CJ (2011-05-26). Que Será Serees: What Will Be, Serees?. CJCS Publishing. ISBN 978-0-615-48304-7.
- Klein, Eric (1993). "Laws of Oceania". Oceania — The Atlantis Project.
- O'Friel, Morgan (2007). Larkenia's Flaws: Volume 1. Grand Rapids: TheSpindle. ISBN 978-0-615-14753-6.
- Edwards, RJ (2009–2014). "Riot Nrrd".

==== "Spivak" 1991 set (e, em, eir) ====
- Dibbell, Julian (1999-01-20). my tiny life: crime and passion in a virtual world. Holt Paperbacks. ISBN 978-0-8050-3626-8. OCLC 38832313.
- Hess, Elizabeth (2003). Yib's Guide to MOOing: Getting the Most from Virtual Communities on the Internet. Trafford Publishing. ISBN 978-1-4120-0290-5. OCLC 52196000.
- Love, Jane (2000). "Ethics, Plugged and Unplugged: The Pegagogy of Disorderly Conduct". In Inman, James A.; Sewell, Donna N. (eds.). Taking flight with OWLs: Examining Electronic Writing Center Work. Taylor & Francis. ISBN 0-8058-3171-1. OCLC 44959404. LCC PE1414.T24 1999.
- Shaviro, Steven (1997). Doom Patrols: A Theoretical Fiction About Postmodernism. London: Serpent's Tail. ISBN 978-1-85242-430-5. LCCN 96068813. OCLC 36149141.
- Spivak, Michael (1990-04-01). The Joy of TeX: A Gourmet Guide to Typesetting with the AMS-TeX Macro Package (2nd ed.). American Mathematical Soc. ISBN 978-0-8218-2997-4. OCLC 22119488.
- Thomas, Sue (2004-03-31). Hello World : travels in virtuality. Raw Nerve Books. ISBN 978-0-9536585-6-5. OCLC 56680697.
- the Orion's Arm universe
- Leckie, Ann (2017-11-26). Provenance. New York: Orbit. ISBN 978-0-3163886-3-4. OCLC 987155122.
- Kobabe, Maia (2019). Gender Queer : a memoir. Lion Forge. ISBN 978-1549304002. OCLC 1106371004.

== See also ==
- Generic antecedents
- Ri (pronoun), Esperanto
- Elle (Spanish pronoun)
- Hen (pronoun), Swedish
- Iel (pronoun), French
- Elu (Portuguese pronoun)
- Gender-neutral pronouns
- Neopronoun
