= Gender neutrality in languages with grammatical gender =

Usage of wording balanced in its treatment of the genders in a non-grammatical sense

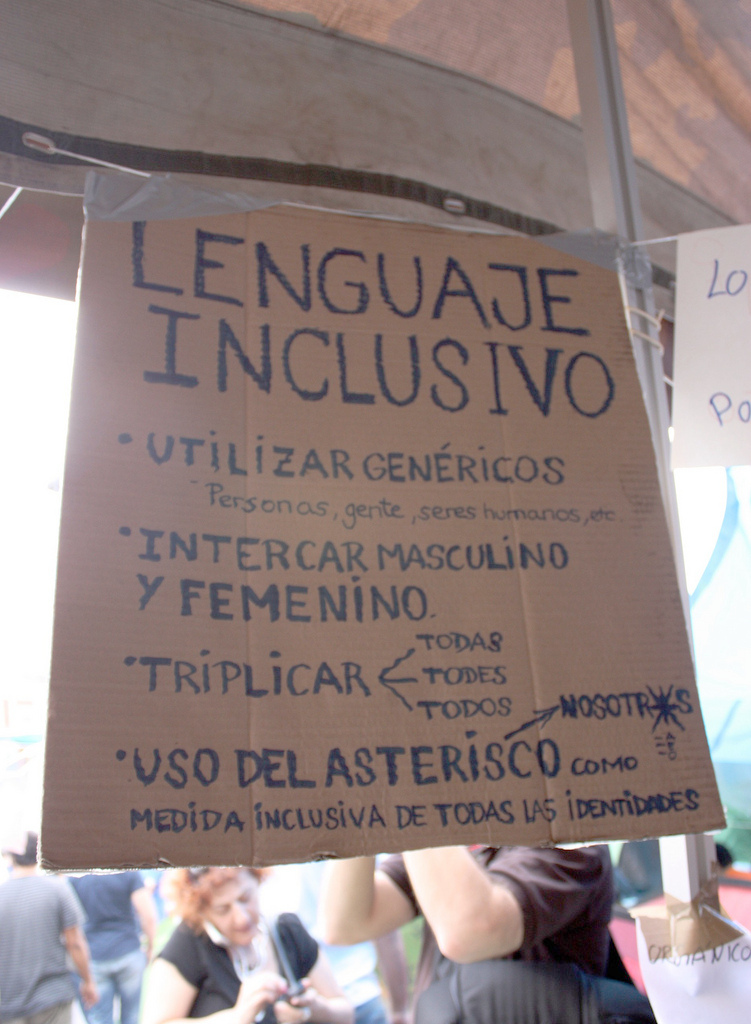
A sign at a feminists' protest in Madrid, Spain, explaining gender-neutral, inclusive language in Spanish

Gender neutrality in languages with grammatical gender is the usage of wording that is balanced in its treatment of the genders in a non-grammatical sense. For example, advocates of gender-neutral language challenge the traditional use of masculine nouns and pronouns (e.g. "man" and "he") when referring to two or more genders or to a person of an unknown gender in most Indo-European and Afro-Asiatic languages. This stance is often inspired by feminist ideas about gender equality. Gender neutrality is also used colloquially when one wishes to be inclusive of people who identify as non-binary genders or as genderless.

== Overview ==
Languages with grammatical gender, such as French, German, Greek, and Spanish, present challenges when it comes to creating gender-neutral language. Unlike genderless languages like English, constructing a gender-neutral sentence can be difficult or impossible in these languages due to the use of gendered nouns and pronouns. For example, in Spanish, the masculine gender is used for include all the people with no sex distinction, and the default form of address for a group of students is the masculine plural los estudiantes, regardless of the gender composition of the group. On the other hand, the feminine plural las estudiantes refers to a group consisting only of female students. However, there is no gender-neutral plural form that can be used to refer to mixed-gender groups. Yet, in German, the pronoun sie is used for all genders as well as for the feminine singular, and the capitalized form Sie is used as a formal, honorific way to address someone.

The challenge of accurately representing all genders in nouns is a common issue faced by languages with grammatical gender, particularly in job titles and professions. One solution has been to create alternative versions of the words, such as using presidenta in Spanish when referring to a female president. At the same time, the newer feminine forms in most such languages are usually derived from the primary masculine term by adding or changing a suffix (such as the German Ingenieurin from Ingenieur, engineer). Citing German as an example, almost all the names for female professionals end in -in, and because of the suffix, none can consist of a single syllable as some masculine job titles do (such as Arzt, doctor). A few times, the female form derives and is employed for both sexes, like in "male nurse" and "male midwife" across several languages. And in a few cases, the male form is derived from the female, as in words for "widow/widower" and "whore/manwhore". However, this solution does not make the noun gender neutral as the noun is still associated with a gender. In many cases, gendered nouns can be replaced by gender-neutral alternatives, such as "docente" instead of "profesor/a" to refer to a teacher, regardless of gender. Gender-neutral nouns can be applied to groups of people to avoid the precedence of one gender. By working within the existing lexicon, modern ideas of gender inclusivity are able to advance without developing entirely new explicit gender-neutral forms.

A further complication is that the creation of distinctly different job titles for men and women means that in writing about hypothetical people of undetermined gender, both words must be mentioned each time, which can become quite cumbersome, or one of the titles must be accepted as genderless which is inherently divisive. In languages where the gender of a noun also affects the formation of other words in a sentence, such as gender-marked adjectives, pronouns, or verbs, this can lead to repetitive or complicated sentences if both terms are used, as the sentence must essentially be repeated twice. The one alternative is the use of gender-neutral nouns that can enclose all people regardless of gender, but this cannot be applied on all cases and on every language.

== Germanic languages ==
In most Germanic languages, nouns have a grammatical gender. The English language is the major exception to this, as most nouns in the English language became genderless between the 11th and 14th centuries.

=== Dutch ===
In Dutch, nouns were traditionally masculine, feminine or neuter, but the distinction between masculine and feminine nouns has become blurred as both use the article de (as opposed to het for neuter words). This has led to the rise of a partial common gender. However, personal pronouns remain gendered (masculine hij versus feminine zij).

There have been different proposals in Dutch to broaden the use of gender-neutral pronouns. Most notably, the pronoun die or hen (direct object form: hen or die, indirect object form: hun or die, possessive form: hun or diens) started gaining traction around 2016. These pronouns are endorsed by the website of the leading Dutch dictionary publisher Van Dale and have been acknowledged by the Dutch Language Union since 2022.

More traditionally, Dutch has employed a variety of means to accommodate cases where the gender of a person is not known. Standard solutions include the use of degene ('the one'; unstressed) and diegene ('that one'; stressed).

=== German ===
The German language uses three grammatical genders: masculine, feminine, and neuter for all nouns, pronouns, and adjectives. The declension system employs suffixes to mark the grammatical gender (m/f/n), number (singular/plural), and grammatical case (nominative, dative, accusative, genitive) of German nouns and adjectives. Nouns referring to people are mostly masculine or feminine, corresponding to their sex. (Note: But not always: Mädchen ("girl") is neuter.) A mixed group of men and women traditionally requires the use of masculine forms; only a group consisting entirely of women uses the feminine plural noun forms. Masculine forms are used for individuals or groups when the sex is not known. Starting in the 1970s, feminists and others have advocated for more gender-neutral usage, creating modified noun forms which have received mixed reactions.

==== Background ====
As in other languages, the masculine word is typically unmarked and only the feminine form requires use of a suffix added to the root to mark it. Feminine forms of German nouns are usually created by adding -in to the root, which corresponds to the masculine form. For example, the root for secretary is the masculine form Sekretär. Adding the feminine suffix yields Sekretärin ("woman secretary"; plural: Sekretärinnen: "women secretaries").

==== Feminist Sprachkritik ====
Grammatical forms have been challenged in parts of larger political movements. The word Fräulein, meaning 'Miss', was banned from use in official correspondence in February 1971.

At the end of the 1970s, groundbreaking work created the field of German feminist linguistics (Note: These groundbreaking works were by the pioneers in German feminist linguistics, Senta Trömel-Plötz, and Luise F. Pusch.) and on the one hand critiqued the inherent structure and usage of German, and on the other men's and women's language behavior, to conclude that German is antagonistic towards women (frauenfeindlich). For example, the use of the generic masculine form when referring to mixed groups makes women have no representation in the language, mirroring a "man's world", and primes speakers to perceive students, professors, employees, bosses, politicians, every group spoken about — as male. Women were invisible in the patterns of speech and this work goes on to say that language doesn't only mirror reality, it creates it.

===== Binnen-I =====
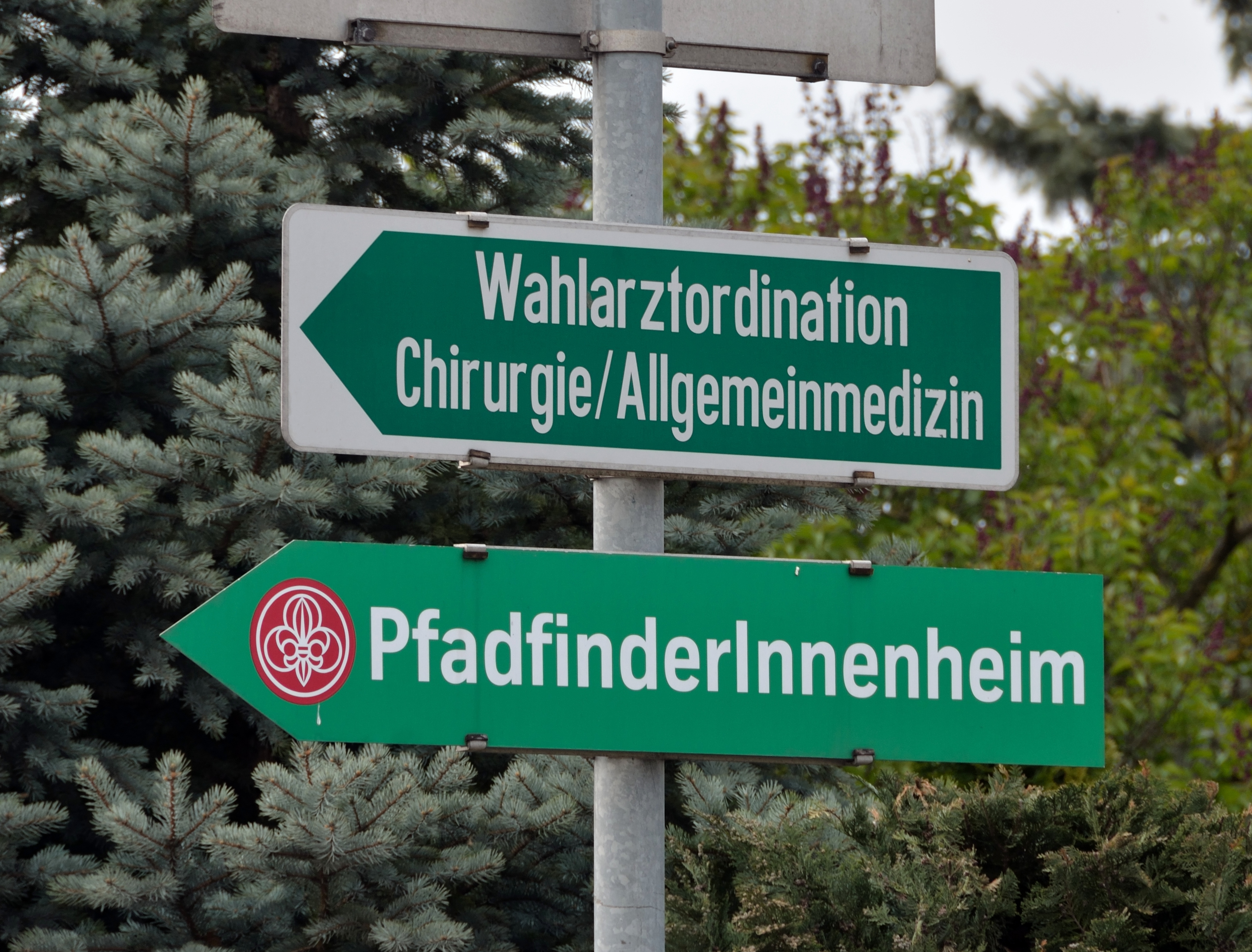
The lower sign PfadfinderInnenheim points to a Scouting residence (Note: Pfadfinder is '[Boy] Scout' + -Innen + Heim ('shelter, hut, residence') gives PfadfinderInnenheim with Binnen-I, so: 'Boy- and Girl Scouts trail shelter.') for Boy- and Girl Scouts. The upper sign Wahlarztordination Chirurgie/Allgemeinmedizin, roughly 'private doctor consultation surgery/general medicine', points to the office of a Wahlarzt, a 'doctor of choice' who is not paid directly by the health insurance company. This sign uses the masculine Wahlarzt and not WahlärztIn.

In the 1990s, a form of contraction using a non-standard typographic convention called Binnen-I with capitalization inside the word started to be used (e.g., SekretärIn; SekretärInnen). In some circles this is especially used to formulate written openings, such as Liebe KollegInnen (Dear colleagues). One obstacle to this form is that one cannot audibly distinguish between terms (i.e. SekretärIn sounds the same as Sekretärin). This is a non-standard solution for how to economically express a position of gender quality in one German word, with an expression that would otherwise require three words, and is not accepted by the Duden, but has achieved a certain level of penetration among some circles in Germany. Opponents of such modification consider the capitalized I in the middle of a word to be a corruption of the language. It is also not clear which gender declension the -In form is to be used with. Sometimes all adjectival endings are likewise capitalized, such as jedeR for "each person" instead of jede (each grammatically female) or jeder (each grammatically male). This form also tends to be associated with the political left, as it is often used by left-leaning newspapers, notably Die Tageszeitung and the Swiss weekly WOZ Die Wochenzeitung, and feminists.

===== Gender gap, gender star and gender colon =====
Since the 2010s, a form is sometimes used in academic and feminist circles in which an underscore (_), an asterisk (*), or a colon (:) is inserted just before the gender-specific suffix, as in "liebe_r Student_in", "liebe*r Student*in", or "liebe:r Student:in" ("dear student"). These forms, called "gender gap", "gender star", and "gender colon" (Gendergap, Gendersternchen, and Gender-Doppelpunkt in German), are meant to convey an "open space" for all gender identities, whether male, female or genderqueer. In spoken language the underscore or asterisk may be indicated by a glottal stop.

=== Icelandic ===
Icelandic words for occupations are typically always grammatically masculine, regardless of the gender of the person with the occupation. There were originally grammatically feminine words for traditionally female occupations (e.g. hjúkrunarkona), but these were replaced with gender-neutral, grammatically masculine words (e.g. hjúkrunarfræðingur) throughout the 20th and early 21st centuries.

The gender-neutral third-person neopronoun hán (a blend of the gendered pronouns hann and hún) is in use.

== Romance languages ==
=== Historical note ===
Ancient Greek and Classical Latin had generic words for "human"/"humanity in general" or "human being"—ἄνθρωπος (anthropos) (grammatically masculine or feminine) and homo (grammatically masculine) respectively—which are the etyma of such modern terms as "anthropology" or Homo sapiens. For "male human as opposed to female human", there existed the separate words ἀνήρ/ἀνδρός (aner/andros) and vir (the etyma of English "androgen" and "virile", respectively). Note Ancient Greek is not a Romance language but the many borrowings we see demonstrates a good contrast with the Latin.

Some modern derivatives of the Latin noun homo, however, such as French homme, Italian uomo, Portuguese homem, and Spanish hombre, have acquired a predominantly male denotation, although they are sometimes still used generically, notably in high registers. For example, French Musée de l'homme for an anthropology museum exhibiting human culture, is not specifically "male culture". This semantic shift was parallel to the evolution of the word "man" in English. Spanish ser humano, Portuguese ser humano and French être humain are used to say "human being". In Romanian, however, the cognate om retains its original meaning of "any human person", as opposed to the gender-specific words for "man" and "woman" (bărbat and femeie, respectively). In Romansh the word um only refers to a male, whereas "human being" is expressed in different ways in the different dialects: carstgaun or uman.

=== Scientific Latin ===
In binomial nomenclature, Latin species names are typically either masculine or feminine, often ending in the -i suffix for masculine names and the -ae suffix for feminine names. In 2021, the species Strumigenys ayersthey was named with the suffix -they (derived from the English singular they pronoun) to create the first gender-neutral Latin binomial name. It was named to honor the non-binary community.

=== Contemporary Latin ===
The Lupercal group of Latinists, seeing how Latin by Classical grammar rules uses grammatical masculine for mixed groups and for generic titles, have decided as their house style to expand Latin grammar so as to be gender-inclusive:

- For nouns and adjectives in the 1st and 2nd declension, a 5th declension third variant is created: amicus (masculine), amica (feminine), amices (new neuter)
- Word pairs with different roots get exchanged with the neuter option: instead of vir (man) or mulier (woman), homo (human) is to be preferred. For the terms "sibling" and "grandparent", as there was no third word, consanguinees (same-bloodied) and proparens (great-parent) are coined
- The -tor/-trix suffix is given a third option -tres (fifth declension): locutor (a male speaker), locutrix (a female speaker), locutres (a speaker)

This is, however, a house style of theirs that is not necessarily followed by other modern Latinist groups.

=== Spanish ===
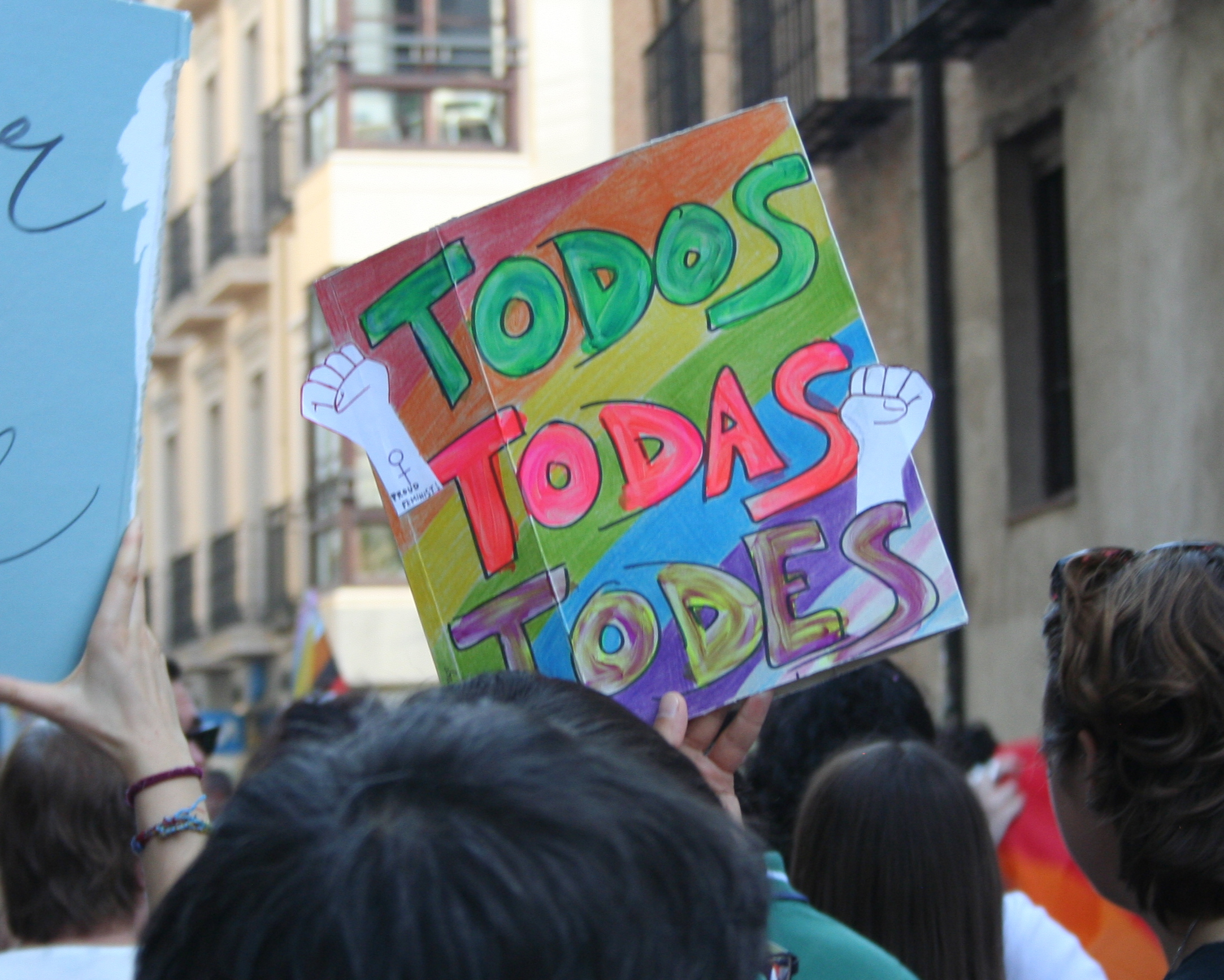
Banner written "todos, todas, todes" at the Valladolid Pride in 2023

In Spanish, nouns, pronouns, articles, and adjectives are marked as masculine or feminine. The feminine is often marked with the suffix -a, while masculine is often marked with -o (e.g., cirujano 'male surgeon' and cirujana 'female surgeon'); however, there are many exceptions often caused by the etymology of the word (la mano 'the hand' is feminine and el día 'the day' is masculine).

As in other Romance languages, it is traditional to use the masculine form of nouns and pronouns when referring to males and females collectively. Advocates of gender-neutral language modification consider this to be sexist and favor new ways of writing and speaking. Two methods have begun to come into use. One of them is to use the at-sign (@) or the letter x to replace -o or -a, especially in radical political writing (¡Ciudadan@s! or Compañerxs), but use of the slash (/) as in (el/la candidato/a or la/el candidata/o) is more common. The ligature æ can be used in the same way (escritoræs for writers of two genders, although escritores/as is more common). Typically these forms are pronounced with an ending [e]. They are also commonly seen simply spelled as -e. There have also been attempts to reword sentences via periphrasis in such way that gendered words referring to people are not used, such as using la persona refugiada 'the refugee person' instead of el refugiado 'the [male] refugee'. There are also attempts of using more gender-neutral nouns such as la pareja 'the pair/couple' in place of los novios 'lit: the boyfriends'. Even the term 'non-binary' is gendered in Spanish, no binario [masculine] and no binaria [feminine].

Some politicians have adopted gender-neutral language to avoid perceived sexism in their speeches; for example, the Mexican president Vicente Fox Quesada was famous for repeating gendered nouns in both their masculine and feminine versions (ciudadanos y ciudadanas). This way of speaking is subject to parodies where new words with the opposite ending are created for the sole purpose of contrasting with the gendered word traditionally used for the common case (like *hombres y hombras instead of hombres y mujeres). There are other grammatical work-arounds, such as using the imperative or impersonal form when speaking, these allow the speaker to avoid using gendered nouns and pronouns for more formal and gender neutral ways of addressing.

The increase in popularity in evolving the Spanish language to be more gender-neutral has come with mixed reception. Particularly the methods of changing the endings of nouns and pronouns seem to be the most controversial as they aim to change the rules of the Spanish language. In 2022, Buenos Aires, the capital of Argentina, gained attention when they banned the use of 'inclusive language' such as -e, -x, and -@ endings in up to secondary education.

=== French ===
To make words or phrases gender-inclusive, French-speakers use two methods.

1. Orthographic solutions strive to include both the masculine and feminine endings in the word. Examples include hyphens (étudiant-e-s), middle dots (étudiant·e·s), parentheses (étudiant(e)s), or capital letters (étudiantEs). The parentheses method is now often considered sexist, because parentheses are used to show something less important. Most writers avoid this practice in official titles such as Governor General and favor the next process.
2. A hendiadys is a phrase that contains two complementary words, and a gender-neutral hendiadys will include a feminine word and a masculine word, e.g. toutes et tous, citoyennes et citoyens.

Within France, this gender-inclusive language has been met with some harsh resistance from the Académie Française and French conservatives. For example, in 2017, Prime Minister Édouard Philippe called for the banning of inclusive language in official documents because it purportedly violated French grammar. Additionally, the Académie Française does not support the inclusive feminine forms of traditionally masculine job titles, stating their position on their website:

L'une des contraintes propres à la langue française est qu'elle n'a que deux genres : pour désigner les qualités communes aux deux sexes, il a donc fallu qu'à l'un des deux genres soit conférée une valeur générique afin qu'il puisse neutraliser la différence entre les sexes. L'héritage latin a opté pour le masculin. [...] Des changements, faits de propos délibéré dans un secteur, peuvent avoir sur les autres des répercussions insoupçonnées. Ils risquent de mettre la confusion et le désordre dans un équilibre subtil né de l'usage, et qu'il paraîtrait mieux avisé de laisser à l'usage le soin de modifier.

One of the constraints of the French language is that it only has two genders; to describe qualities common to both sexes, it was necessary to impart a generic value to only one of the two genders so it can neutralize the difference between the sexes. The Latin heritage opted for the masculine. [...] Changes, made deliberately in one area, may have unexpected consequences in others. They risk sowing confusion and disorder in a subtle balance that has been achieved through use, and that it would seem better advised to leave it to usage to make any changes.

In this same statement, the Académie Française expressed that if an individual wishes for her job title to reflect her gender, it is her right to name her own identity in personal correspondences.

In contrast to linguistic traditionalism in France, the use of feminine job titles is more widely accepted in the larger Francophonie. The use of non-gendered job titles in French is common and generally standard practice among the francophones in Belgium and in Canada. By law in Quebec, the use of gender-inclusive job titles is obligatory if the writer has not opted for gender-free terms.

Although some long-established positions of high prestige, such Governor General of Canada exist in both masculine and feminine variants, honorary titles remain masculine throughout the Francophonie even when the award or honor is bestowed unto a woman. Examples are titles such as Grand Officier, Commandeur, Officier, Chevalier, Compagnon, Immortel used in the Order of Canada, the National Order of Quebec, France's Legion of Honor and the Académie Française, or Belgium's and Monaco's Order of the Crown.

The most common way of feminizing job titles in French is by adding a feminine suffix to the masculine version of the noun, most commonly -e (l'avocat, l'avocate), -eure (le docteur, la docteure), -euse (le travailleur, la travailleuse), -esse (le maire, la mairesse), -trice (le directeur, la directrice). For job titles ending in epicene suffixes such as -iste (le/la dentiste) or -logue (le/la psychologue), the only change is in the article (le/la) and any associated adjectives. Abbreviated professions only change the article as well (le/la prof).

In some cases, words already had a feminine form which was rarely used, and a new one was created. For instance docteur had the feminine doctoresse but docteure was still created. Chasseur had the feminine chasseresse (typically used only of the goddess Artemis) but chasseuse was still created. Nowadays both feminine forms can be encountered, with the old ones being generally more prevalent in Europe and the new ones in Québec.

Words that formerly referred solely to a dignitary's wife (l'ambassadrice) are now used to refer to a woman holding the same dignitary position. Although marriage titles have mainly dropped out of use, many cite the possible confusion as a reason for continuing to use those such as Madame le Président or Madame l'ambassadeur. For this reason, the traditional use remains the most frequent in France. Nonetheless, in France, the husband of a female ambassador would never be known as Monsieur l'ambassadrice. Instead, he would be called literally "the ambassador's husband", le mari de l'ambassadeur. The title mademoiselle has been rejected in public writing by the French government since December 2012, in favour of madame for all adult women, without respect to civil status.

Non-binary French-speakers in Canada have coined a gender-neutral 3rd person pronoun iel as an alternative to the masculine il or feminine elle. Iel was also added to Le Petit Robert in November 2021. Exam boards in the UK now permit students in secondary schools to use gender-neutral and gender-inclusive expressions, including neopronouns, in language assessments.

=== Portuguese ===
==== Brazilian ====
In practice, the proposal is to use E as a nominal ending for words that admit gender inflection (e.g., Ariel é muito esperte, "Ariel is very smart"). However, there are other proposals other than with neologisms, and this myriad of concepts carry polyphony. The letter "x", such as in "todxs" was also used, including in Braille.

The first-person possessive pronoun, in contrast to masculine 'meu' and feminine 'minha,' is 'minhe' in neutral form (e.g. Ariel é minhe namorade, "Ariel is my partner"). For third-person personal pronouns (where the masculine is 'ele' and the feminine is 'ela'), the most recognized options are 'elu' and 'ile', among others, the usage depends on the user's preference.

Brazilian Portuguese is strongly regionalized, so gender neutral language does vary from state to state. For example, the gender neutral language from the São Paulo community is different compared to gender neutral language from the Rio Branco. Also, due to Brazil's conservative society and reactionarism, gender neutral language is often seen as a political statement, and law proposals against its use, as well as sex education, are highly politicized within anti-gender movement.

In Portuguese glossing for Brazilian Sign Language, the at sign (@) is used to express gender neutrality (e.g. OBRIGAD@).

=== Italian ===
In Italian, female job titles are easily formed with -a, -essa and other feminine suffixes: a female teacher is a maestra, a female doctor is a dottoressa. Historically, for jobs that have only recently opened up to women, there was some resistance to using the feminine forms, which are considered ugly or ridiculous, but recent surveys argue the average citizen has no problem with these forms. For example, a female lawyer can be called avvocata or avvocatessa (feminine) but some might prefer to use the word avvocato (masculine). Opponents of these feminine forms claim that they're offensive because they overemphasize the gender, or that they're incorrect neologisms. The Accademia della Crusca and the Treccani have spoken in favour of the usage of feminine job titles.

In spite of traditional standards of Italian grammar, some Italians in recent years have opted to start using the pronoun "loro" (a literal translation of English "they"), to refer to people who desire to be identified with a gender neutral pronoun, although this usage may be perceived as incorrect due to the plural agreement of verbs. The suffix -u, while not commonly used in standard Italian, has also been suggested as a gender neutral suffix.. In a similar way, some advocated using the schwa (ə) as a new letter to signify a neutral or non-binary gender. However, most Italians would understand this new symbol orally as a masculine ending, visually as a feminine ending. In 2025, Italy banned these attempts to neutralize from being taught in schools, including the asterisk usage.

=== Catalan ===
The most common gender-neutral third-person pronoun in Catalan is elli, derived from the gendered pronouns ell and ella.

== Semitic languages ==
=== Hebrew ===
Hebrew has a high degree of grammatical gender. Virtually every noun, as well as most verbs and pronouns of the second and third person, is either grammatically masculine or feminine. As a result of campaigns for employment equality and gender neutral language, laws have been passed in Israel that require job ads to be written in a form which explicitly proclaims that the job is offered for both males and females. The separator "/" is often used, for example, דרוש/ה, d(a)rush/a, מזכיר/ה, mazkir/a ("wanted", masculine and feminine, and "secretary" masculine and feminine, respectively). In recent years, the practice has spread to use a "." character for that purpose. The Hebrew Language Academy is opposed to both of those practices.

In addition, there are multiple efforts to add gender-neutral grammar to Hebrew, mostly led by American Jews. One example is the Non-binary Hebrew Project, which uses the suffix אֶה (-eh) for the gender-neutral/non-binary form of a word.

In a separate instance of language change, certain 2nd and 3rd person feminine plural verb forms of earlier Hebrew have become archaic in modern Israeli Hebrew. What used to be old masculine plural forms are now used for both masculine and feminine.

== Slavic languages ==
=== Russian ===
Russian intrinsically shares many of the same non-gender-neutral characteristics with other European languages.

Job titles have a masculine and a feminine version in Russian, though in most cases the feminine version is only used in colloquial speech. The masculine form is typically treated as "unmarked", i.e. it does not necessarily imply that the person is male, while the feminine form is "marked" and can only be used when referring to a woman. In some cases, the feminine title is used, on occasion, as derogatory or with connotation of a suboptimal performance. In other cases, it is only used as slang, e.g. врачиха (vrachíkha, female doctor), директорша or sometimes директриса (direktórsha and direktrísa resp. – female director). Sometimes, this is not the case: актриса (aktrísa, actress), поэтесса (poetéssa, poetess; e.g. Anna Akhmatova insisted on being called поэт (poét, masculine) instead). Masculine terms are used in more formal contexts that stress the individual's membership in a profession: В 15 лет она стала учителем фортепиано (V 15 let oná stála uchítelem fortepiáno, "At age 15 she became a piano teacher [m]", formal register). The feminine form may be used in less formal context to stress a personal description of the individual: Настя стала учительницей (Nástya stála uchítel'nitsey, "Nastya became a teacher [f]", informal register). Military ranks and formal offices may also have a feminine term (e.g. генеральша generál'sha, советница sovétnitsa), which usually means that the referred person is the wife of the appropriate office holder. However, this use is somewhat archaic.

=== Slovak ===
Gender-neutrality occurs in Slovak in certain forms of conjugation and certain forms of address. When addressing someone directly in the present tense or making a definitive statement about them in the future tense, the first and second person of both the singular and plural number does not directly distinguish the gender of the individual or group of people being addressed. Thus, verbs such as mám/nemám, vidím/nevidím, idem/nejdem (first person singular), máš/nemáš, vidíš/nevidíš, ideš/nejdeš (second person singular), máme/nemáme, vidíme/nevidíme, ideme/nejdeme (first person plural), máte/nemáte, vidíte/nevidíte, idete/nejdete (second person plural) are gender-neutral, as they apply to all three genders (masculine, feminine and neuter) in the usual form of the present tense and future tense. In contrast, the past tense distinguishes grammatical gender more thoroughly even in the first and second persons of both the singular and the plural.

In terms of social address, the formal plural (honorific plural) is commonplace in Slovak when addressing complete strangers, or people whom the speaker is not acquainted with on an informal basis, or people in a formal work environment. Both male and female individuals are addressed with a gender-neutral sounding formal plural in such social situations. (This is equivalent to the German and French use of the same type of plural, or English's transition to using the honorific you in both singular and plural.) An occasional colloquial mistake of Slovak speakers is using the formal plural but still gendering the verb as masculine or feminine, despite the only standard manner for using formal plural being the non-gendering of the verb used in formal plural. Boli ste spokojní ? is a formal plural that asks "Were you satisfied ?" any individual (regardless of gender) or any group of people (again, regardless of gender). An informally addressed form of the question would be Bol si spokojný ? (masculine grammatical gender) or Bola si spokojná ? (feminine grammatical gender). The neuter gender sentence Bolo si spokojné ? is technically possible, but no person is ever addressed in the neuter gender in everyday speech. It is important to bear in mind that directly addressing a boy or girl on an everyday basis with the more neuter-gender forms chlapča or dievča is not an honorific, and would be considered very old-fashioned (i.e. 19th century) in modern everyday Slovak, and even somewhat condescending in tone towards a younger person. The formal plural in Slovak is not simply neuter grammatical gender, but a formulation that encompasses all three grammatical genders (masculine, feminine, neuter).

== Celtic languages ==
Nouns in the six modern Celtic languages belong to either one of two groups, masculine or feminine. There are only two singular third person personal prounouns which correspond to the grammatical gender of the noun to which they refer; for example, the Scottish Gaelic for "It is big" is Tha e mòr when referring to leabhar, "a book" (masculine), but Tha i mòr when talking about deoch, "a drink" (feminine).

A very small number of nouns in some languages can be either masculine or feminine. When referring to these mixed-gender nouns, a decision has to be made, based on factors such as meaning, dialect or sometimes even personal preference, whether to use a masculine or feminine pronoun. There are no neutral or mixed-gender singular third person pronouns.

The result of how having two grammatical genders manifests itself in each individual language is detailed below.

=== Welsh ===
In Welsh, the third person singular personal pronouns are ef, (f)e, (f)o "he, it" and hi "she, it". Hi, "she", is the traditional dummy pronoun; it is used when talking about the weather, Mae hi'n wyntog, "It is windy", or time, Mae hi'n ddeg o'r gloch, "It is ten o'clock".

The singular possessive pronoun ei is the same word for both masculine and feminine referents, but the gender difference is seen in the sound changes it effects on the following word. When masculine, ei the subsequent word will take a soft mutation, but when feminine, ei causes an aspirate mutation or prefixes an h to a vowel and the semivowel [j]. An example of this is the word cath "cat" becoming either ei gath "his cat" or ei chath "her cat".

Grammatical gender is sometimes shown in other parts of speech by means of mutations, vowel changes and specific word choices. Examples of this include:

- y mwyaf "the biggest" (masculine) without mutation vs y fwyaf "the biggest" (feminine) with soft mutation
- Cafodd Sam ei weld "Sam was seen" (masculine) with soft mutation of gweld vs Cafodd Sam ei gweld "Sam was seen" (feminine) with no mutation
- cochyn "a redhead" (masculine) vs cochen "a redhead" (feminine)
- un gwyn "a white one" (masculine) vs un wen "a white one" (feminine) with mutation and vowel change
- pedwar cariad "four lovers/boyfriends" with masculine pedwar vs pedair cariad "four lovers/girlfriends" with feminine pedair

A few job titles have gendered terms, for example dyn busnes "businessman" and dynes fusnes "businesswoman". In other instances a feminine job title may derive from a masculine one such as feminine gofalwraig "carer, caretaker" from masculine gofalwr, or ysgrifenyddes "secretary" from ysgrifennydd. Occasionally only one meaning of a masculine word can be made feminine, for example, when "secretary" refers to a personal assistant, there are masculine and feminine forms, ysgrifennydd and ysgrifenyddes respectively, however when "secretary" is used as a title for people in leadership, the only valid form is ysgrifennydd. This means, in her job as Cabinet Secretary for Education, Kirsty Williams is always Ysgrifennydd y Cabinet dros Addysg despite being a woman. The same is true of athro and athrawes, which are the masculine and feminine words for "teacher", but when used to mean "professor", only athro can be used.

Theoretically any job title can be made feminine but in practice most job titles without a feminine suffix are used as a gender-neutral term. Some authorities emphasize that a distinction needs to be made between biological sex and grammatical gender. The Welsh Academy English–Welsh Dictionary explains "it must be reiterated, gender is a grammatical classification, not an indicator of sex; it is misleading and unfortunate that the labels masculine and feminine have to be used, according to tradition. (...) There is no reason why nouns ending in -wr, -ydd should not refer equally well to a woman as to a man." This is why the Welsh Government's Translation Service recommends translating such phrases as "If a parent sends his or her child to school" is translated as "Os bydd rhiant yn anfon ei blentyn i'r ysgol", literally "If a parent sends his child to school" as rhiant "parent" is a masculine noun.

Some consider the agent suffix -ydd to be more gender neutral than -wr however the Translation Service advises against the use of words ending in -ydd in job titles unless it is natural to do so. This means that established words such as cyfieithydd "translator" are readily used whereas terms such as rheolydd for "manager" instead of rheolwr or cyfarwyddwraig "(specifically feminine) director" instead of cyfarwyddwr are proscribed by the Service. It does however allow for their use in personal contexts such as email signatures and business cards.

A distinction in gender is also found in some other classes of words, for instance, those referring to nationality. This becomes is more apparent in Welsh, which prefers to use a noun, than in English, which tends to use an adjective of nationality, for example, "He is Irish" is more often Gwyddel yw e "He is an Irishman" and "She is Irish" becomes Gwyddeles yw hi "She is an Irishwoman". With countries that do not have such a close connection with Wales, usually those further away, only one form of the noun is found, for example, Rwsiad "a Russian" (both masculine and feminine). Phrases can also be used rather than a single word and these can be gender specific, e.g., dyn o Angola "a man from Angola, an Angolan" and merch o Angola "a woman from Angola, an Angolan", or have one form for both referents, e.g., un o Angola "one from Angola, an Angolan".

In the plural, there is a single third person plural pronoun, nhw "they", and no distinction is made for grammatical gender. With nouns, the tendency is to use the form of the grammatically masculine nouns when referring to groups of mixed sex, so athrawon "teachers" (from masculine athro) is used when describing male and female teachers together. The plural athrawesau "teachers" (from feminine athrawes) exists is used rarely and in contexts where the speaker desires to emphasize the fact that the teachers are female.

=== Irish ===
Within the Irish language, poor usage of the language has resulted in lack of discussion of gender neutrality, with language advocates primarily focusing on improving language services and promoting usage of any form. However, some terms for job titles have seen a reduction in usage. 'Bean-gharda' is viewed as outdated, and now 'garda' is used regardless of gender. Similarly, 'banaltra' (with the prefix 'ban-' indicating female gender) and 'banaltra fir' have seen a replacement with 'altra'. Others remain unaltered, such as 'fear an phoist' and 'bean an phoist', both of which indicate gender equally. Terms such as 'banríonn', meaning 'queen', also remain unaltered.

In 2018, a 'Queer Dictionary / Foclóir Aiteach' was launched, providing Irish-language terminology for gender-neutral terms used in English.

=== Cornish ===
The Cornish independent third person singular pronouns are ev 'he, it' and hi 'she, it'.

Ken George has recently suggested a complete set of gender-neutral pronouns in Cornish for referring to non-binary people, based on the forms George believes these pronouns would take if the neuter gender had survived from Proto-Celtic to Middle Cornish (independent *hun, possessive *eydh, infixed *'h, demonstrative *homma, *humma, and prepositional suffix *-es).

Job titles usually have both a masculine and feminine version, the latter usually derived from the former by means of the suffix -es, for example, negesydh "businessman" and negesydhes "businesswoman", skrifennyas "(male) secretary" and skrifenyades "(female) secretary", sodhek "(male) officer" and sodhoges "(female) officer". In the last example, compare Welsh swyddog which uses the grammatically masculine term for both males and females. Occasionally, nouns have only one gender despite referring to either males or females, for example kannas "messenger" is always feminine.

== See also ==
- Gender role
- Grammatical gender
- IGALA (International Gender and Language Group)
- Markedness
- Gender-neutral language
  - Binnen-I, a convention for gender-neutral language in written German
  - Gender-neutral language in English
  - Gender neutrality in languages with gendered third-person pronouns
  - Gender neutrality in genderless languages
  - Gender-specific and gender-neutral third-person pronouns
  - Gender-neutral pronoun
    - Hen (pronoun)
    - Elle (Spanish pronoun)
    - Ri (pronoun)
    - Singular they
- Pronoun game
- Feminist language planning
- Lavender linguistics
