= Gender neutrality in Portuguese =

Gender-neutral language in Portuguese

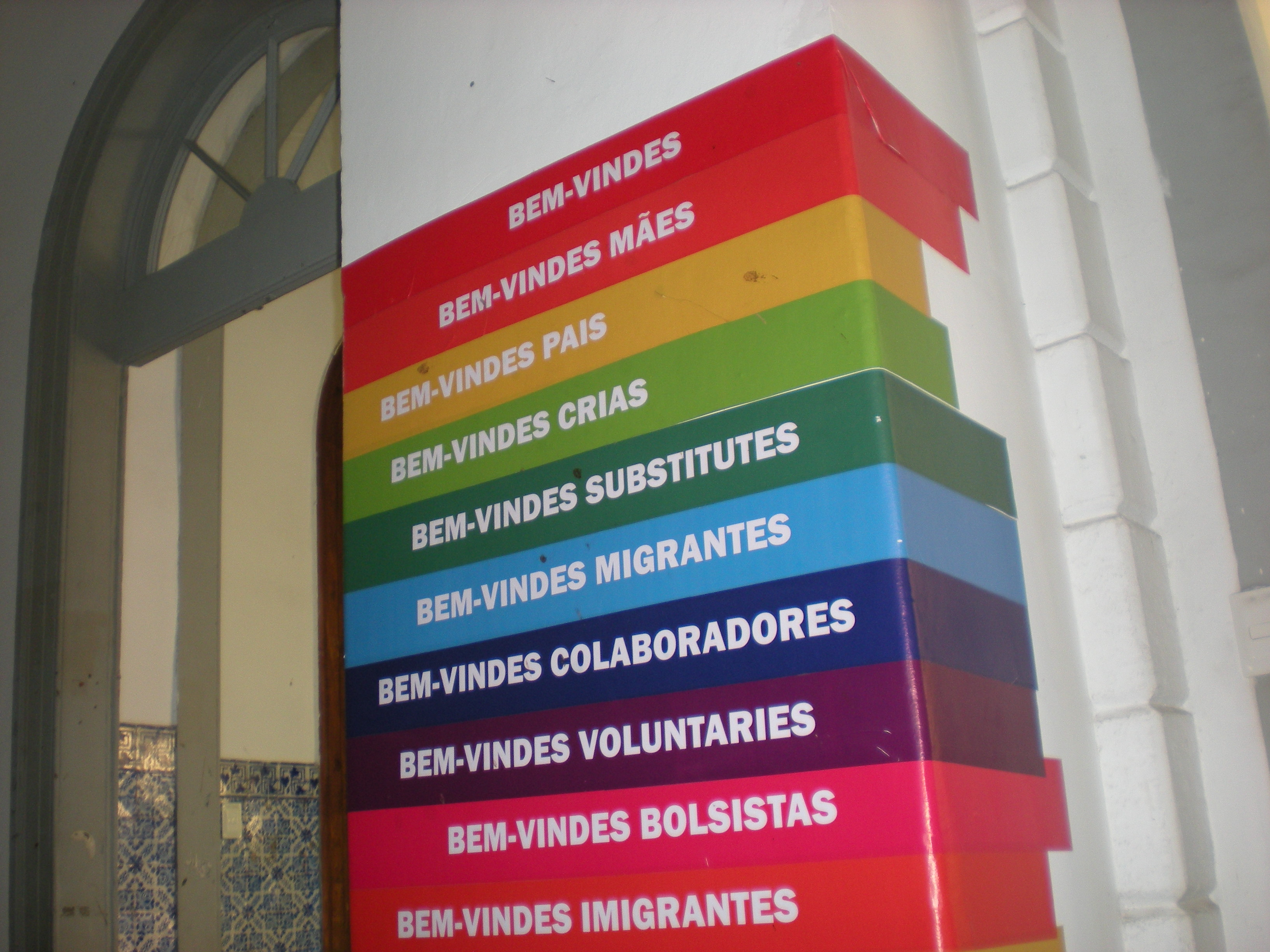
Use of gender-neutral words at Federal University of Rio de Janeiro

Gender-neutral language in Portuguese is a recent strand of demands for greater gender equality and social inclusion between men, women and non-binary individuals. It can be divided into inclusive or non-sexist language, and non-binary or neuter language or neolanguage. Inclusive language aims to use existing words to include all genders, while neuter language uses new or modified words to accomplish this.

== Context ==
Most words in Portuguese have one grammatical gender, the masculine or the feminine. The creation of gender-neutral terms and removal of gender markers aims to make non-binary people feel included.

== Proposals ==
=== Agreement ===
One of the proposal is using metonymy, periphrasis and circumlocution following agreement, sometimes including the usage of people-first language, whereas the word pessoa (Portuguese: person) has feminine grammatical gender with no natural gender markedness, similar with the usage of no pronouns in English, a form of gender omission. Many nouns and adjectives are referred as "uniforms", which are words that can be used to refer to people of any gender, they are not necessarily neutral but are useful for an inclusive language. This proposal is known as gender-inclusive language or gender-neutral syntax.

=== -x and @ ===
Gendered suffixes, especially ⟨-o/-a⟩, are replaced with at sign ⟨-@⟩ or ⟨-x⟩ to neutralize words, such as in alun@s (students) and todxs (everyone). These forms are not pronounceable, they are meant to be graphical, being criticized for not being readable by screen readers and seen as potentially ableist. The use of at signs are recorded since 1990s, such as in words "Unid@s" (United).

The at sign is often used in LIBRAS to represent gender neutrality, and the -x suffix is transliterated into Braille.

=== Neolanguage ===
Neolanguage (Portuguese: neolinguagem) stands for neologistic desinences, articles, nouns, and declensions along with pronouns. A form of neolanguage can be expressed with the words amigues (friends), psicólogue (psychologist), and linde (pretty) for example, using ⟨-e⟩ suffix. Usually, not using the article is recommended, however there are proposals for articles, such as u(s) and ê(s). Neolinguistic terms can be used for groups of multiple genders or non-binary individuals, for example.

Words such as namorade (enbyfriend or theyfriend) or branque/negre (white/black) are recorded since at least between 1980s and 2000s, when the proposal wasn't so much picky towards -e word ending.

==== Neopronouns ====
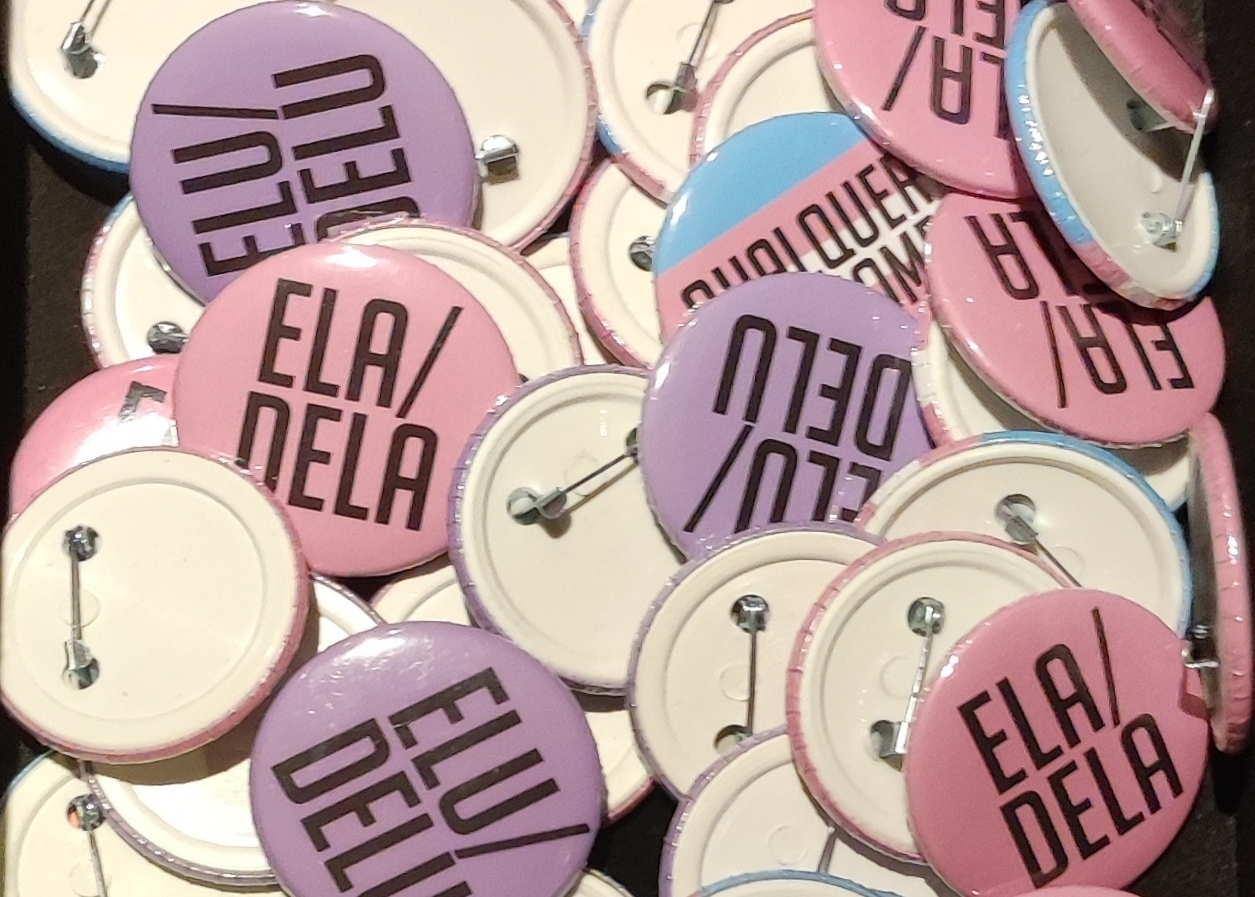
Buttons with Portuguese pronouns.

Portuguese neopronouns are a gender-neutral approach to pronominal reference to living things, especially humans. They are neopronouns, i.e. a newly developed, intentional innovation of language (as opposed to natural language change).

Depending on the ungendered neopronoun one identifies with (e.g. elu), there are various suggestions. Elo, for example, is recorded since 1970s to describe travestis. See the below table with suggestions for various inflections of some neopronouns:

ele(a)	ilu	elu	el	elx	ile	ili	éle	el@	elæ	êla	elo
ele/a(s)	ilu(s)	elu(s)	el(s)	elx(s)	ile(s)	ili(s)	éle(s)	el@(s)	elæ(s)	êla(s)	elo(s)
dele/a(s)	dilu(s)	delu(s)	del(s)	delx(s)	dile(s)	dili(s)	déle(s)	del@(s)	delæ(s)	dêla(s)	delo(s)
nele/a(s)	nilu(s)	nelu(s)	nel(s)	nelx(s)	nile(s)	nili(s)	néle(s)	nel@(s)	nelæ(s)	nêla(s)	nelo(s)
este/a(s)	istu(s)	estu(s)	est(s)	estx(s)	iste(s)	isti(s)	éste(s)	est@(s)	estæ(s)	êsta(s)	esto(s)
deste/a(s)	distu(s)	destu(s)	dest(s)	destx(s)	diste(s)	disti(s)	déste(s)	dest@(s)	destæ(s)	dêsta(s)	desto(s)
neste/a(s)	nistu(s)	nestu(s)	nest(s)	nestx(s)	niste(s)	nisti(s)	néste(s)	nest@(s)	nestæ(s)	nêsta(s)	nesto(s)
esse/a(s)	issu(s)	essu(s)	ess(s)	essx(s)	isse(s)	issi(s)	ésse(s)	ess@(s)	essæ(s)	êssa(s)	esso(s)
desse/a(s)	dissu(s)	dessu(s)	dess(s)	dessx(s)	disse(s)	dissi(s)	désse(s)	dess@(s)	dessæ(s)	dêssa(s)	desso(s)
nesse/a(s)	nissu(s)	nessu(s)	ness(s)	nessx(s)	nisse(s)	nissi(s)	nésse(s)	ness@(s)	nessæ(s)	nêssa(s)	nesso(s)
aquele/a(s)	aquilu(s)	aquelu(s)	aquel(s)	aquelx(s)	aquile(s)	aquili(s)	aquéle(s)	aquel@(s)	aquelæ(s)	aquêla(s)	aquelo(s)
daquele/a(s)	daquilu(s)	daquelu(s)	daquel(s)	daquelx(s)	daquile(s)	daquili(s)	daquéle(s)	daquel@(s)	daquelæ(s)	daquêla(s)	daquelo(s)
naquele/a(s)	naquilu(s)	naquelu(s)	naquel(s)	naquelx(s)	naquile(s)	naquili(s)	naquéle(s)	naquel@(s)	naquelæ(s)	naquêla(s)	naquelo(s)
àquele/a(s)	àquilu(s)	àquelu(s)	àquel(s)	àquelx(s)	àquile(s)	àquili(s)	àquéle(s)	àquel@(s)	àquelæ(s)	àquêla(s)	àquelo(s)
praquele/a(s)	praquilu(s)	praquelu(s)	praquel(s)	praquelx(s)	praquile(s)	praquili(s)	praquéle(s)	praquel@(s)	praquelæ(s)	praquêla(s)	praquelo(s)

There is no consensus on which articles should precede the gender-neutral pronouns.

== Usage ==
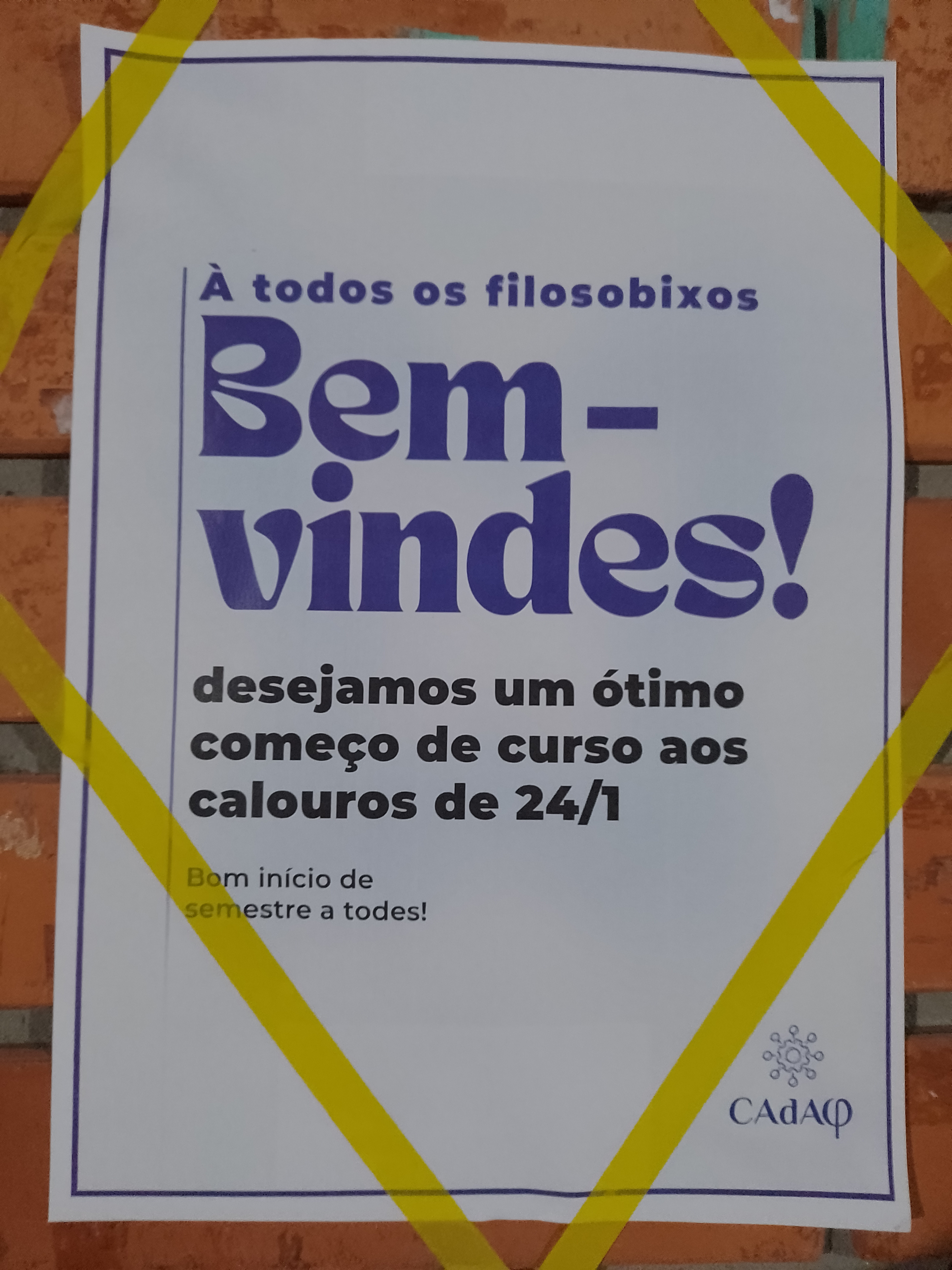
Welcome poster for freshers in the Philosophy course at the Federal University of Rio Grande do Sul for the first semester of 2024.

In June 2020, Pride Month, the official Facebook page made neolinguistic use of the neolanguage in "juntes," in a Valentine's Day post, live streams, and cover photo, as an alternative to the masculine "juntos" and the feminine "juntas" (both mean "together").

During the 2020 Summer Olympics, commentator Natália Lara and analyst Conrado Santana, from SporTV, used the pronoun "elu" to refer to Quinn during the women's soccer match between Canada and Japan.

The use of neopronouns has also occurred in the Brazilian versions of games such as Battlefield 2042, Valorant, and Baldur's Gate 3. Presenter Ana Paula Padrão used the term "bem-vindes" (welcome) on the MasterChef Brasil program in 2023, to include non-binary participant Will Duarte, and her comment resonated on social media.

In 2021, the Jornal da USP has also used a gender-neutral neologisms to refer to people of Asian descent, such as Armenian, Arab, or Indian. In the same year, the Museum of the Portuguese Language published an article using the word "todes" (all).

In 2025, the Economic and Social Council (CES) of Portugal proposed a manual of "neutral and inclusive language" to govern internal and external communication. The proposal suggests replacing generic masculine terms with neutral expressions, such as "população trabalhadora" (working population) instead of "trabalhadores" (workers). However, this initiative faced objections from some organizations, leading to the postponement of its implementation.

The use of neopronouns has occurred in some sources to refer to non-binary actors.

Many TV series, documentaries, films, and programs feature characters whose personal pronoun is originally "they"; in many cases, these are translated in the Portuguese dubbing or subtitles with neolinguistic adaptations.

=== Political use and satire ===
On 2 August 2022, then-President of Brazil Jair Bolsonaro mocked the use of gender-neutral language in Argentina on Twitter, claiming "[...] that now there is 'desabastecimente' [shortages], 'pobreze' [poverty] and 'desempregue' [unemployment]. [...]", however this is not an official recognition of the language by the government.

In 2023, ministers in Lula's government used gender-neutral language, and the term "todes" (all) was adopted in official government ceremonies. Agência Brasil used the word "eleites" to refer to LGBTQ parliamentarians.

During debates ahead of the 2024 São Paulo municipal election, Pablo Marçal sarcastically referred to Guilherme Boulos as "Boules" when questioning why the National Anthem had been sung in gender-neutral language during a rally. The incident sparked investigations against the campaign.

Satires also compare the use of the -es suffix as gender-neutral alternative with Mussum's dialect, who frequently used humorous interjections such as "cacildis".

== Views ==
Evanildo Bechara, a Brazilian philologist and grammarian and member of the Brazilian Academy of Letters (ABL), stated that neutral language is not scientific but rather opinion-based. The criticism also came from Merval Pereira, president of the ABL, who argued that no one can force students to use this type of language.

The Brazilian Linguistics Association has repeatedly expressed its opposition to the ban on gender-neutral language, publishing a note repudiating the approval of Bill 6.256/2019 by the Chamber of Deputies, arguing that the bill distorts its original purpose and imposes inappropriate linguistic restrictions, including the ban on gender-neutral language, criticizing the lack of scientific basis for the measures adopted and advocating for more inclusive and effective public communication.

== Legal issues ==
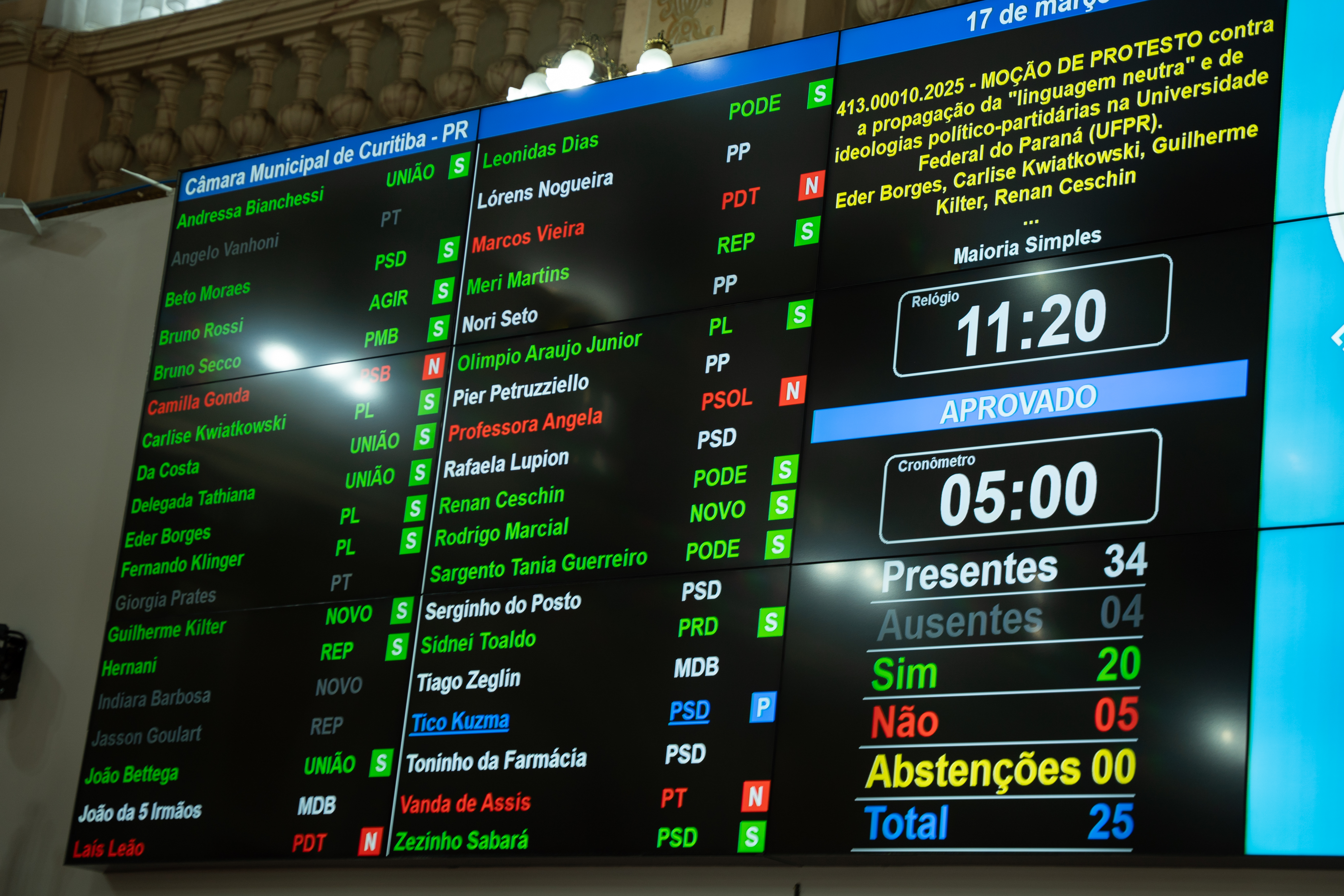
A protest, launched by the Municipal Chamber of Curitiba, against the use of gender-neutral language by the Federal University of Paraná.

On 30 July 2025, Professor Maria Inês da Silva, from the Federal University of Mato Grosso, left the Municipal Conference of the Unified Health System in Cuiabá after being interrupted by the city's mayor, Abilio Brunini (PL), for using gender-neutral language.

A law, sanctioned by President Lula on 17 November 2025, instituted the National Plain Language Policy (Law 15.263/25), and in its item XI, Article 5, it states "not to use new forms of inflection of gender and number of words in the language in contravention of the consolidated grammatical rules, Vocabulary Orthographic of the Portuguese Language (Volp) and the Orthographic Agreement of the Portuguese Language, promulgated by Decree No. 6,583, of 29 September 2008".

Supreme Federal Court (STF) has revoked several laws and law proposals against the use of gender-neutral language in schools, either municipally or statewidely, since 2023. The justices analyzed an Allegation of Non-Compliance with a Fundamental Precept filed by the National LGBTI Alliance and the Brazilian Association of Homotransaffective Families in a virtual plenary. The organizations argue that the legislation violates the fundamental rights to freedom of speech, as well as the freedom to learn and professorship, and the ban entails censorship of teachers, affecting the dignity of non-binary people — those who do not identify exclusively as male or female — by prohibiting them from using the language in which they feel most comfortable. The institutions recall Supreme Court decisions that recognized the rights of the LGBTI+ population.

== See also ==
- Neuter (grammar)
- Epicenity – Quality of a word with identical female and male forms
- Gender-neutral language
- Gender neutrality in languages with gendered third-person pronouns
- Gender neutrality in languages with grammatical gender
- Gender neutrality in Spanish
- Elle (Spanish pronoun)
- Gender reform in Esperanto
- Ri (pronoun)
- Hen (pronoun)
- Iel (pronoun)
- Latinx – Gender-neutral term for Latin Americans
- Portuguese grammar
- Personal pronouns in Portuguese
