= Feminist language reform =

Effort to change how language is used to gender people, activities and ideas

Feminist language reform or feminist language planning refers to the effort, often of political and grassroots movements, to change how language is used to gender people, activities and ideas on an individual and societal level. This initiative has been adopted in countries such as Sweden, Switzerland and Australia.

== History ==
Linguistic activism and feminist authorship stemming from second wave feminism in the 1960s and 70s began to draw attention to gender bias in language, including "the uncovering of the gendered nature of many linguistic rules and norms". Feminists attended conferences and, as a way of activism, they interrupted to point out they were not feeling included because of linguistic uses. Scholarship such as Dennis Baron's Grammar and Gender and Anne Bodine's "Androcentrism in Prescriptive Grammar" uncovered historical male regulation to promote male-centric language such as the use of "he" as a generic pronoun. In the 1970s sexism in language was a topic of discussion at an international feminist conference.

The 1970s feminist movement led to the title Ms becoming more widely used. Previously, Miss and Mrs were used in order to indicate a woman's marital status. However, the title Mr does not imply marital status, so feminists saw it necessary to find a parallel term. The use of these expressions is still a subject for feminists in a few languages, such as Spanish.

Exposition and analysis of sexism in language through a grassroots feminist linguistics movement continued throughout the 80's and 90's, including study across languages and speech communities such as Germany and France. Study and documentation of gendered language has since spread to cover over 30 languages.

Feminist language planning has more recently been instituted centrally in countries such as Sweden, Switzerland and Australia, with mixed results.

Sweden has made strides towards shifting their language to fit a less misogynistic society. The introduction and widespread adoption, since 2000, of the word snippa for female genitalia is considered an example of successful feminist language reform in Swedish. Snippa is a neutral, colloquial term for female genitalia originally promoted for use with and by little girls. The word snopp, akin to "willy" in English, was already in widespread use in Swedish. Like "willy", the word snopp is used with children to refer to the penis without any medical or vulgar connotations. Noting that standard Swedish lacked an equivalent neutral term for female genitalia, social worker Anna Kosztovics began promoting the use of snippa in 2000. Through history, there have been many slang terms used for the woman's genitalia, including words such as fitta translated to "cunt", där nere translated to "down-there", and even mus translated to "mouse". In the 1990s, Swedish media started to bring the absence of such a word to light. It was not until the early 2000s that feminists and activists start using the word snippa to be identified with the female genitalia. Snippa's origins can be traced back to many different Swedish dialects. Its popular definition "refers to something small and/or narrow, for example a small pike or a narrow boat". In regards to genitalia, "it might have been used to refer to female genitalia of cows and pigs in the early twentieth century". Since the popularization of using the word Snippa, the Swedish Academy added the word to the 2006 Swedish Language Dictionary.

Some language reformers directly work with identifying and changing sexist undertones and patriarchal vocabulary through a method called "linguistic disruption". An example: In the United States, the word "herstory" became popularized "to refer to history which is not only about men".

Sweden has also shown efforts in language planning regarding changing misogynistic undertones in their vocabulary. The Swedish Association for Sexuality Education has promoted the word slidkrans to replace the word for "hymen", mödomshinna. The new word, slidkrans, is made up of the two parts slid, translating to "vaginal" and krans, translating to "garland". It lacks the connotations of the ideology of virginity and honour attached to mödomshinna." The gender-neutral pronoun hen was originally promoted by feminists and the LGBT community. Controversial at the outset, it has gained wide acceptance in Sweden, is used in schools, and recently was added to dictionaries.

Australia has been identified as a nation that officially promotes the feminist influence to its public bureaucracy by implementing feminist language reform across many institutions. Since this planned social shift, Australia has seen changes in political and government leadership that aim to interfere with this reform, such as a shift towards a conservative-leaning government. There are shifts that come from such movements that support them as well, such as the gender-neutral pronoun "they" being more widely accepted.

The ongoing feminist movement acknowledges language as a "powerful instrument of patriarchy". The goals set for linguistic reform aim to achieve linguistic equality of the sexes. A study of Australian newspapers from 1992 and 1996 found that the word "chairman" was used to describe all people holding the position, including women. This is an example of a linguistic issue that feminists seek to reform. Occupational nomenclature reflects gender bias when "professional nomenclature used in employment-related contexts displays bias in favour of men leading to women's invisibility in this area." The invisibility of women is a linguistic feminist issue because when encountering sentences predominantly using male pronouns, listeners are more likely to think of men before women and therefore women get overlooked. Positions are gendered to be male and the "continuing, frequent use reflects the fact that far more men than women continue to occupy this position." This study further investigated and found instances of female professionals being specified as women while men would just be titled with the profession itself, for example "female judge", "woman engineer", and "woman politician".

=== Switzerland ===
Switzerland has attempted to implement feminist language reform both formally and informally. However, changes in Switzerland have proven to be complicated because Switzerland is a multilingual country (with the major languages being German, French, and Italian). The Bulletin Suisse de Linguistique Appliquée (Swiss Bulletin of Applied Linguistics) addressed this issue in 2000 when it created a special issue dedicated to the feminization of language in Switzerland. The bulletin attempted to critique language in Switzerland by creating a composite image of all the languages in Switzerland and how they interact with gender.

The most commonly spoken language in Switzerland is German. German is a gendered language. This has concerned some language activists due to the fact that many important societal positions such as judge and professor possess the gender of male and are often referred to as he/him. Activists worry that the gendering of those words discourages women from entering those fields. This facet of the German language is particularly important in Switzerland because it was historically used as a justification to restrict women's right to vote and pass the bar.

Various attempts to implement feminist language reform have been undertaken in German-speaking Switzerland. The government and other organizations have attempted to implement language feminization in the realms of policy making, teaching, advertising, etc. Feminization of language refers to when in writing or talking traditional male words are feminized by either using the feminine variant of the word or adding a feminine suffix. However, these attempts have had only limited success. For example, private Swiss radio and television broadcasts still generally use the generic-masculine form of words.

The second most commonly spoken language in Switzerland is French which is also a gendered language. The French language raises similar concerns to that of the German language. This is because many nouns (especially those of professions) are gendered. To address these concerns, the Swiss government has created a guide on the non-sexist use of the French language. However, these attempts at change have been met with little success. This is due to the fact that Switzerland has limited influence over the French language. Meanwhile, France and specifically the government backed Académie Française (the French council for matters relating to the French language) has resisted feminist language reform.

=== French ===
Many French occupational nouns have, since the 17th century, only had a masculine default form. In the past, there was confusion when the job was held by a woman as the noun would still be treated as masculine although the position holder was feminine. This then led to writers needing to clarify that they were referring to a woman through other clues in the sentence.

Today, when these masculine words are modified to refer to a woman a suffix is added. One way to combat this, deemed exclusionary grammar, was to use a masculine form in reference to a man, and a feminine form in reference to a woman in order to make women visible. Other frequently used methods to clarify that the job was also hiring women include having the masculine form of the noun as the role, followed by H/F, or homme/femme (man/woman) and having the masculine form listed with the feminine form in parentheses. Due to the fact that there are gendered distinctions in French nouns, employers must indicate that the job corresponds to either a man or a woman.

=== English ===
Some groups have made an effort to advocate for the change from male nouns such as chairman and spokesman to gender non-specific nouns such as chairperson and spokesperson. However, critics question the efficacy of this approach as they argue that the gender non-specific nouns are only used in reference to a woman, and men are still referred to by male specific nouns.

Regarding adding non-sexist language, some writers contend that this will only be effective in groups that already are devoted to non-sexist behavior. Contrarily, the non-sexist language will struggle to succeed if the speakers are not dedicated to the change.

Sheila Michaels is credited with popularizing Ms. as a default form of address for women regardless of their marital status.

Kate Swift and Casey Miller co-wrote influential books and articles about sexism in the English language.

Efforts to shift towards non-sexist language were supported by an important publisher in 1973 as part of a slow shift away from male-centric noun usage.

In 1990, two important Toronto based newspapers, the Globe and Mail and the Star, modified their policies on sexist language in an effort to stop the usage of man as a general term. Additionally, the goal was to move away from any male nouns in these papers.

==== Australian English ====
In Australia, there has been a promotion of "Ms." to take the place of "Miss" and "Mrs.", similar to the role of "Mr." This title was meant to rectify gender imbalances, but met challenges as it was difficult to remove the other two widely utilized feminine titles and for all women to accept "Ms." Both men and women play a role in this shift as people must accept utilizing "Ms." while others must accept being referred to as "Ms.," in order for this courtesy title to grow in popularity. Education in Australia plays a large role in this language usage change as it is utilized to gain awareness about gender-bias in language and to formulate gender inclusive alternatives. Furthermore, in Australian English, the usage of the generic masculine pronoun has greatly decreased and has largely been replaced by the singular they in unscripted public speech. This results from non-sexist language reform promoting generic pronouns.

=== Spanish ===
In Spanish, feminists have been looking for a language reform since the 1970s. The changes proposed have been more related to the neutralization of expressions, and currently there are also proposals from the grassroots movement using a morpheme to include people who self-identify as non-binary. This is not only the case of the pronoun "elle" but also the use of -e as a morpheme instead of the gender morphemes, -a (feminine) and -o (masculine).

== Theory ==
The main focus of feminist language reform is to acknowledge the often unconscious ways that language both silences and emphasizes gender in negative ways. In some languages it is clear with gendered nouns how some words are gendered to associate those words with femaleness or maleness. Feminist philosophers argue that English, a non gendered language, still has the need for language reform.

Previous language reform attempts to avoid sexist words or phrases were addressed in a symptomatic manner. Often in the workplace, employees were given pamphlets with lists of words to avoid or preferred words to use. Many modern day feminists argue that this is ineffective because it does not address the root of the problem or make the large scale changes to the language that they feel are necessary.

A major part of the theory focuses on when words or phrases make one gender, typically women, subjugated or invisible compared to the other. The most popular examples are the pronoun “he” or the word “man”. Feminist language philosophers argue that these words participate in making women invisible by having them being used to refer to men and also women. The fact that the pronouns or words for the male gender can be also used to refer to the female gender shows how maleness is dominant and femaleness is subjugated.

Feminist language theory also focuses on when words or phrases emphasize a break in gender norms. Clear examples of this are words like lady doctor or manageress. These are positions of power that are typically held by men. Therefore, when a woman holds them, they need a new title to emphasize their break of social norm. It also goes both ways, with terms like male nurse referring to a man in a typically feminine role. Feminist language reform seeks to remove words like this because they help to sustain unhealthy gender norms.

Some modern feminists, like Sergio Bolaños Cuellar, argue that feminist language reforms need to reverse the generic masculine forms and create a generic feminine form with words like he or man being replaced with she or woman.

Linguistic theory, or the way people understand language, also influences the way linguistics plays into gender power structures. The structuralist approach to linguistic theory is based on the belief that language should be studied only looking within language instead of the ways it is influenced by external forces. The 'cognitivist' approach focuses on the connection from language to the brain, and the 'sociocultural' approach highlights the role that culture and social context plays in language. One's own interpretation of linguistic theory may change their assumptions on how best to change sexist language.

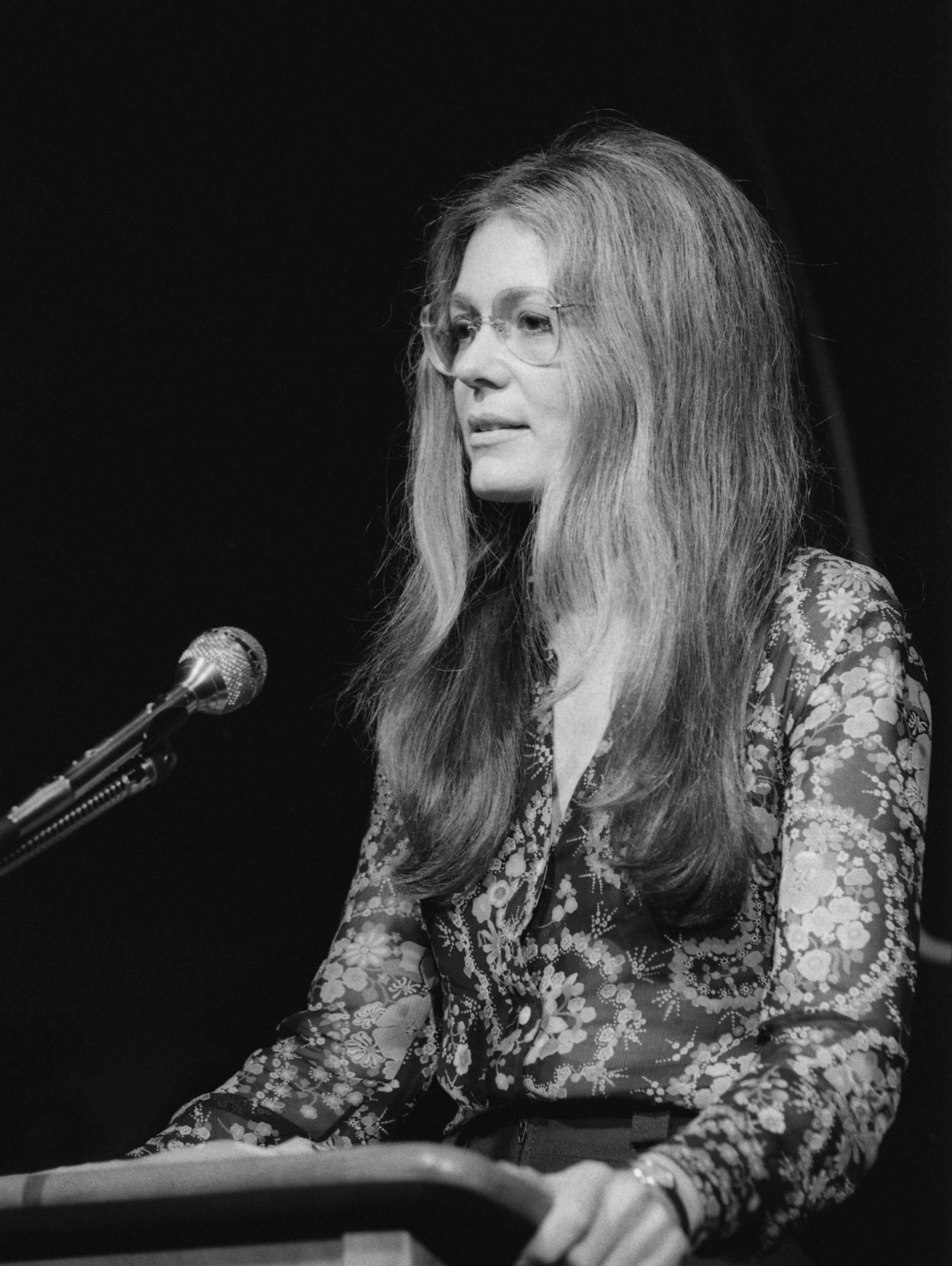
Activist Gloria Steinem in 1975

Some women's accounts suggest they are alienated from language or that they are not the owners of their words. In order to reclaim the power of language, some theorists argue that feminist language must be integrated. Gloria Steinem said "We have terms like 'sexual harassment' and 'battered women.' A few years ago, they were just called 'life'", and theorists such as Crawford and Fox assert that this is essential in shifting gendered power dynamics.

Relating to LGBT linguistics, the idea that the linguistic distinction between sex and gender changes our perception of identities is common among feminist linguistic theorists. When 'sex', referring to biological sex, is used, as opposed to 'gender', which refers to femininity and masculinity, as a marker of identity, feminist theorist Rhoda Unger suggests that gendered differences become naturalized, which is harmful for women.

== Implementation ==
Cases of feminist language planning have taken a largely sociolinguistic approach in which the goal is to enact social change through the reform of language and language use. This approach to language planning is divided into four stages:

1. Fact-finding in which language issues are identified and reported.
2. Planning in which solutions to the issue are proposed.
3. Implementation in which agreed upon methods are tested and the final solution implemented.
4. Evaluation and Feedback in which the results of the plan are assessed for effectiveness and the overall effects of the plan are evaluated.

== Criticism ==
Writing about translation from Yiddish (a gendered language) to English in the Jewish Feminist Journal, Hinde Ena Burstin says that she does not like gender neutral language as in gendered languages, it is clear what gender is being talked about. For example, "poetese" being a gendered word for "woman poet". She says that it is similar to the "woman doctor" or "lady driver" which has been campaigned against, and that using "poet" on its own assumes that the poet is a man and that women have to be further identified. Burstin also mentioned that within her translations, using gender neutral language removed sexism.

== See also ==
- Binnen-I, a convention for gender-neutral language in German
- Gender-neutral language
- Gender neutrality in languages with grammatical gender
- Gender-neutral pronoun
  - Ri (pronoun), Esperanto
  - Elle (Spanish pronoun)
  - Hen (pronoun), Swedish
  - Pronoun game
- LGBT linguistics
