= IEL =

IEL may refer to:

- IDP Education, Australian company (ASX:IEL)
- Industrial Estates Limited, Canadian company
- Industrial Equity Limited, Australian company
- Institute for Extended Learning, a school in Spokane, Washington
- Intraepithelial lymphocyte, cells of GALT
- Istanbul High School, Istanbul (Erkek) Lisesi, a highschool in Istanbul, Turkey
- Intelligent Extraterrestrial Life, such as aliens.
- Iel (pronoun), in French
