= ELX =

ELX may stand for:

- English League XI
- Elx, a gender-neutral pronoun in Portuguese
- Elche, a municipality of Spain, also known as Elx in Valencian
