= Elle (Spanish pronoun) =

Proposed gender-neutral Spanish pronoun

Elle (Spanish pronunciation: [ˈeʝe], or less commonly [ˈeʎe] plural: elles [ˈeʝes]) is a proposed personal pronoun in the Spanish language which is not currently in widespread use. It is intended as a grammatically ungendered alternative to the third-person, gender-specific pronouns él ("he"), ella ("she"), and ello ("it")—with elles proposed as an alternative to gendered plurals ellos/ellas ("they").

Elle is intended to refer to people outside of the gender binary, or may alternatively be used to refer to people whose gender is unknown or unspecified. This usage can be seen as equivalent to the English singular they.

This pronoun is not endorsed by the Royal Spanish Academy (RAE) or any other official Spanish-language institution. Although it was briefly incorporated into the RAE's website on October 27, 2020, it was removed four days later.

== Origin ==
The use of a neutral pronoun in Spanish has been demanded by non-binary and other gender-diverse individuals who do not feel comfortable using traditional masculine and feminine pronouns. Psychologists and activists have noted the importance of using appropriate pronouns as a basis for respecting the identity, visibility, and acceptance of non-binary or transgender individuals. The creation of a new, neutral pronoun is thought to be a way to address the current lack of suitable pronouns in the Spanish language for this community.

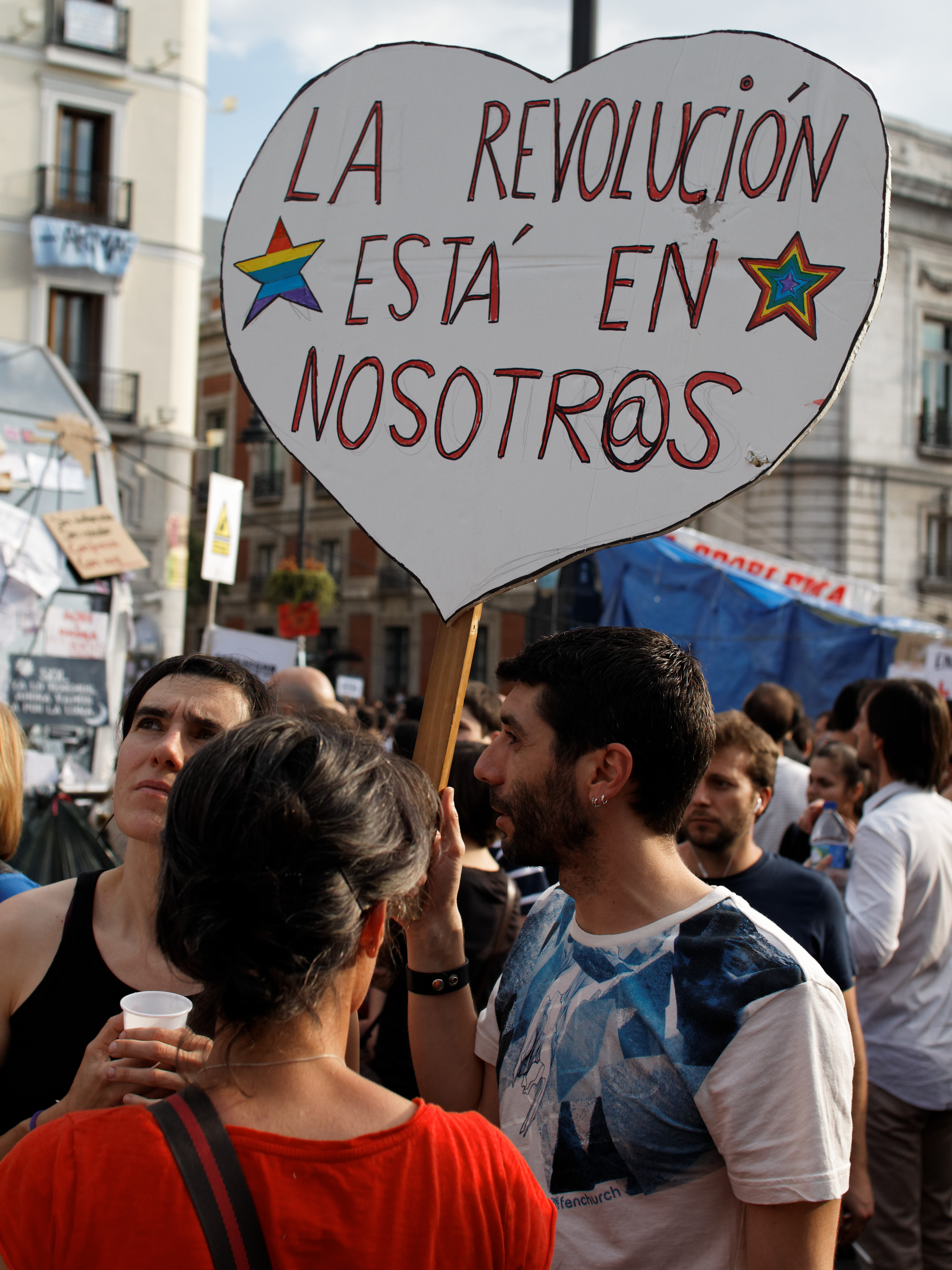
Protester with a banner using the @ symbol during demonstrations of the 15-M movement in Puerta del Sol, Madrid, Spain. In English, the sign reads, "The revolution is in us", but with the gender of nosotros (us) neutralized with the form nosotr@s.

In recent years, the increased visibility of gender-diverse individuals and the emergence of new forms of communication, such as websites, blogs, and social networks, allowed for new digital forms of expression and language. One of the earliest examples of this was the adoption of the at symbol (@) to replace the gendered endings "-a" or "-o" in Spanish. Because of its shape, which resembles a combination of the letters "a" and "o", and its wide availability on keyboards, the symbol became one of the first mechanisms of gender neutrality in writing. However, its usage is limited to written communication. Similarly, the letter "x" has also been used to replace the gendered "-a" or "-o". Thus, pronouns like ellxs and ell@s were created. However, neither pronouns can be pronounced as they are written. This limitation creates difficulties for visually impaired individuals who rely on electronic communication systems that do not recognize these words, and individuals with learning disabilities like dyslexia.

The use of "-e" as a gender neutral ending for nouns and adjectives in Spanish, replacing the feminine "-a" and masculine "-o", has been proposed since at least 1976. This option began to gain popularity several decades later as an alternative to "-x" and "-@", as its use seemed to address the pronunciation issues surrounding the latter forms. Derived from this usage of "-e" on nouns and adjectives, the pronoun form of elle emerged as a combination of él and ella. This is intended to refer to non-binary individuals and to serve as a grammatically neutral option when gender is not specified.

== Debate on its use ==
The use of elle is limited, being more frequently used within LGBTQ contexts, and particularly among younger individuals. However, its use has been a subject of debate among linguists and philologists.

According to those advocating for its use, elle allows for the identification of individuals who do not feel comfortable with other terms, thus respecting their identities. According to some studies, the inclusion of neutral pronouns in other languages has been connected with the reduction of sexist attitudes. Other experts note that elle would also facilitate a more accurate translation of terms from languages that do not have a gendered component, either because neutral pronouns are already in use (as in Swedish and English) or because one wishes to refrain from disclosing gender for other reasons.

However, some linguists have expressed opposition to the creation of a new pronoun, arguing that it is unnecessary because gender neutrality in Spanish already exists in the form of the generic masculine. Other linguists have expressed opposition to the adoption of the term on the grounds that they do not see it as feasible to impose a new word on existing speakers of a language. They argue that it will only become legitimate if it is naturally accepted by the majority of society over time, as is the case in other examples of language change and development. Linguist Carme Junyent i Figueras opposed the term, depicting it as an imposition on the language by minority groups who "expose themselves to ridicule" with such proposals, arguing that this would not generate any further societal tolerance of differential gender expression.

=== Position of the Royal Spanish Academy ===
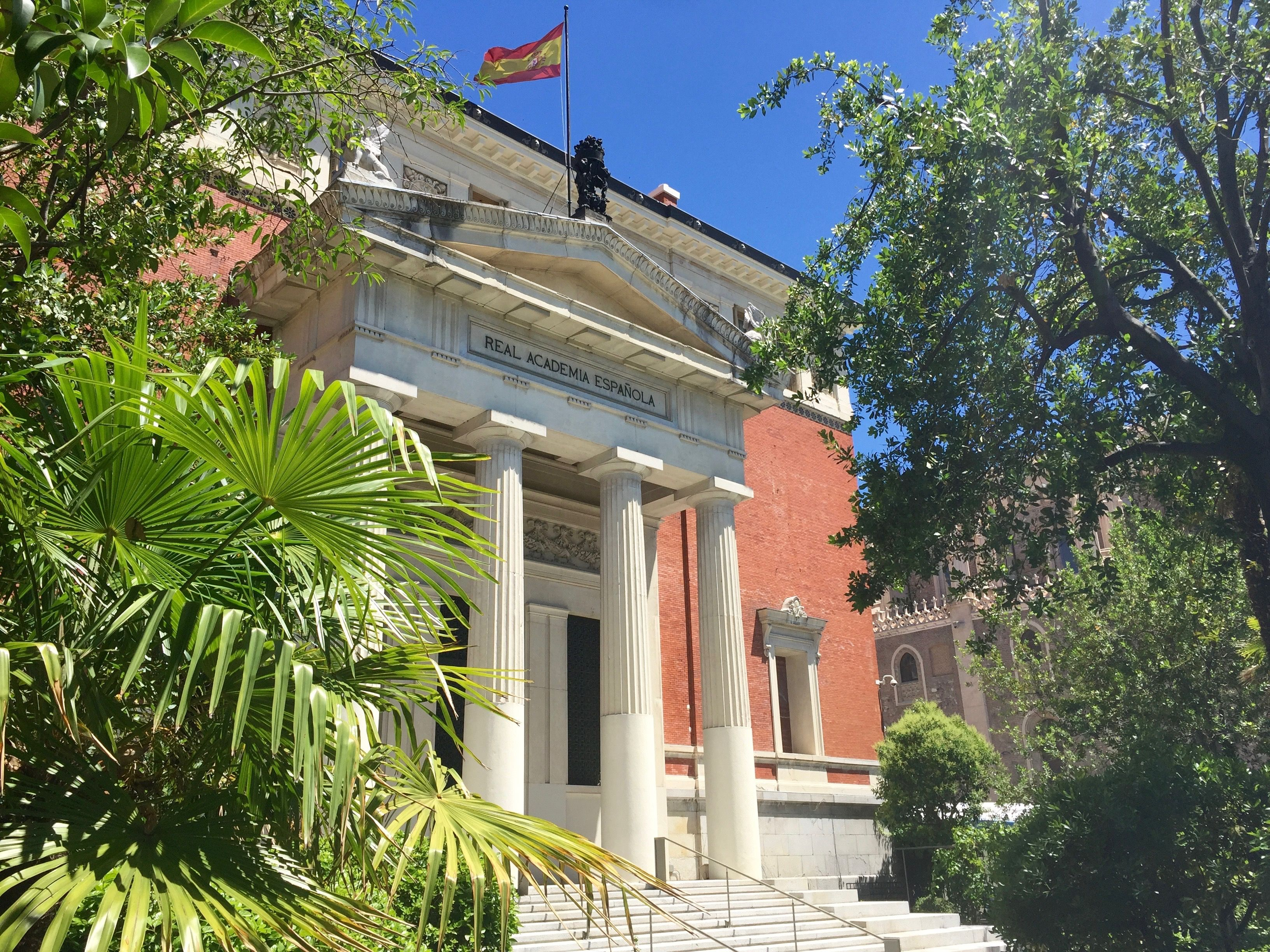
In October 2020, the Royal Spanish Academy included elle in its Observatory of Words, withdrawing it days later.

On October 27, 2020, the Royal Spanish Academy (RAE) included the pronoun elle in its Observatory of Words, a section of its website intended to inform the public about words and neologisms under evaluation but not incorporated in the dictionary, though a word's appearance here does not imply acceptance of its use by the RAE. In that section, the RAE defined elle as follows:

The pronoun elle is a resource created and promoted in certain areas to refer to those who may not feel identified with either of the two traditional genders. Its use is not widespread or established. The use of elle as the name of the digraph ll is noted in the DLE.

Despite the unofficial status of entries in the Observatory of Words, the inclusion of elle generated considerable discussion and confusion. Days later, the RAE decided to withdraw the word to avoid confusion regarding its official status in the language. In this regard, the institution stated: "Once the function and remit of this [Observatory of Words] section become widely known, this will be reassessed".

=== Debate proposed by the North American Academy of the Spanish Language ===
In 2018, an article in favor of inclusive language published by the EFE News Agency, as well as in Le Monde diplomatique edición Chile, sparked a wide-ranging debate via email among members of the North American Academy of the Spanish Language (ANLE), in a debate instigated by Tina Escaja. This led, in turn, to the ANLE commissioning its Center for Studies to produce a report on the status of inclusive language among Spanish speakers in North America and other countries. The work was carried out by researchers Tina Escaja and Natalia Prunes, who compiled a series of studies on inclusive language, including on the use of the pronoun elle, which was published by the ANLE in 2021.

Escaja argued that it was necessary to question the dogmatic position expressed by the Royal Spanish Academy regarding inclusive language and that the intention in the selection of texts included was to "open up the dialogue and reflect on social reality, such that we might be able to put forward linguistic strategies that will help to fight against gender discrimination".

The report specifically refers to elle on two occasions. In one instance, its use is incidentally noted by the Argentinian press (p. 141). The second mention is by Elena Castro, a linguist at Louisiana State University, who mentions the topic in an article titled "Google Translate does not 'understand': forging inclusion within exclusionary languages", where she writes:

Recently, a promising proposal has emerged: the use of "elle." Many non-binary individuals in our country, and even several publishing houses, have begun to use "elle" as their preferred pronoun of choice, both for the third person plural and for the third person singular, for persons of undefined or non-normative gender who do not see themselves in, or do not identify with, binary or identity-based categories, and also for those cases in which the pronoun refers to a trans person. (p. 292)

== See also ==
- Gender-neutral language
- Gender-neutral pronoun
- Neopronoun
- Pronoun game
- Iel (pronoun)
- Ri (pronoun)
- Feminist language planning
- Lavender linguistics
- Latinx
