= Iel (pronoun) =

Neo-pronoun in French

Iel (pronounced [i.ɛl] or [jɛl]) is a neopronoun in the French language intended as an alternative to the gender-specific pronouns elle ("she") and il ("he"). It has been adopted by the Le Robert dictionary but is not officially accepted by the Académie Française.

== Background ==
Grammatical gender in French consists of two genders: the masculine and the feminine. To make words or phrases gender-inclusive, French-speakers use two methods:

1. Orthographic solutions strive to include both the masculine and feminine endings in the word. Examples include hyphens (étudiant-e-s), median-periods (étudiant·e·s), parentheses (étudiant(e)s), or capital letters (étudiantEs). Most writers avoid this practice in official titles such as Governor General and favor the next process.
2. Hendiadys solutions contain a feminine word and a masculine word: toutes et tous, citoyennes et citoyens.

== History of usage ==
The "iel" pronoun is a French language neologism. Although the origins of the pronoun are unclear, it dates back to at least the early 2010s, including alternative spellings such as "iell," "ielle," and "ille."

In April 2018, a group of doctoral students lobbied for the standard usage of "iel" along with other gender neutral language at the Université du Québec à Montréal. The Syndicat des chargées et chargés de cours de l'UQAM said that it was sympathetic to opening a discussion on the issue. In 2019, the UQAM student newspaper Montréal Campus announced that it was adopting "iel" in its standard style guide.

In August 2019, the Canadian federal government's Language Portal of Canada stated that "writing in a way that is inclusive of non-binary people [in the French language] is a contemporary linguistic challenge," saying that there was no consensus on best practices. That year, the Office québécois de la langue française advised against standard usage of "iel" and other gender neutral neologisms, proposing instead that writers avoid using gender-specific terms when possible.

In January 2021, Canadian national broadcaster Radio-Canada announced that it had formed a committee to discuss including "iel" and using écriture inclusive (fr; gender-neutral language) in its style guide. The broadcaster had previously not used écriture inclusive, and used the pronoun on a case-by-case basis only.

In October 2021, the Petit Robert added "iel" to its online dictionary. The dictionary's general secretary Charles Bimbenet stated that the word was still relatively uncommon but had become increasingly used throughout 2021.

In September 2025, Québec Minister for the French Language Jean-François Roberge announced that he would be banning the use of écriture inclusive, including the "iel," in official government documents, saying that it was necessary to preserve coherence in government language and to ensure that government communications could be understood by the widest number of people.

== Debates ==
LGBT+ rights advocates and feminists have argued in favour of the pronoun's use, arguing that it makes the language more inclusive and less sexist. Some advocates have also raised concerns that lack of gender neutral options in French might force non-binary people to turn towards languages that do have more prominent gender neutral options instead, notably the English language. According to Kiki Kosnick of Augustana College:

While some neologisms have not yet taken off, the personal pronoun iel (pronounced [jɛl]; sometimes written yel) is indeed surfacing as a promising alternative to il and elle. Phonetically, it blends properties of the binary pronouns il and elle, which suggests a fusion or continuum of the two (an in-between space that serves some non-binary individuals who see themselves on a spectrum between traditionally masculine and traditionally feminine). At the same time, the phonetic and orthographic similarity iel shares with il and elle allows interlocutors and readers to easily recognise it as a third-person subject pronoun.

He goes on to say:

some people in non-binary communities reject iel on the premise that it is indeed too similar to standard subject pronouns. They express concern that this similarity could lead people to believe it is a slight mispronunciation or typo (and not its own unique non-binary pronoun) and/or not to notice a distinction at all.

Debates around the pronoun have also focused on the difficulty of introducing gender neutrality into a language where every noun falls into one of two genders. Even in cases where a gender neutral pronoun is used in a sentence, the rest of the words in that sentence would still need to be conjugated accordingly, requiring the introduction of neutral word endings as well.

According to Catherine Lalonde of Le Devoir, discussions surrounding the pronoun have been less polarised in Canada than in France. Sylvain Sarrazin of La Presse has also noted that the pronoun has received a more positive reception in Québec than in France. Mathieu Avanzi of the Sorbonne University has stated that use of the pronoun is more prominent in online culture than in traditional media culture.

Mathieu Goux of the University of Caen Normandy has argued that the French language is often viewed "with the idea that it should never change" and that the "iel" has seen resistance similar to Verlan. French Minister Delegate for Gender Equality, Diversity and Equal Opportunities Élisabeth Moreno had defended use of the pronoun, saying that it can enrich the language and including it "doesn't force anything on those who don't want to use it."

Canada Research Chair in Language Interactions Nicole Rosen has stated that opposition to the pronoun "has nothing to do with linguistics. It's purely political." Gwenaëlle Perrier of the Conservatoire national des arts et métiers has called debates over the pronoun "a pretext" that "allows the normalisation of anti-feminist discourse."

Radio-Canada linguist Guy Bertrand has argued that use of the pronoun is "absolutely possible in a social context," but that "it's absurd in a linguistic context because you can't just decide to change a language just like that." The Académie Française has rejected écriture inclusive, stating that "in French, the neutral takes the form of the masculine."

French Minister of National Education since 2017 Jean-Michel Blanquer argued against the pronoun after the Petit Robert added it to its dictionary, saying that "l'écriture inclusive is not the future of the French language." His comment came in defence of La République En Marche! MP François Jolivet who had argued that the pronoun was "woke ideology" and "a manifest ideological intrusion which undermines our common language." Earlier in 2021, Jolivet had sponsored legislation aimed at prohibiting the use of gender-neutral language in government publications, arguing that it "blurs the message and complicates the learning of the French language." Brigitte Macron, wife of French President Emmanuel Macron, also argued against the pronoun, saying that "feminism is a grand cause, but it's not a cause that's worth changing the French language for."

== See also ==
- Hen (pronoun)
- Singular they
- Elle (Spanish pronoun)
- Ri (pronoun)
- Elu (Portuguese pronoun)
- LGBTQ rights in France
