= Rolling pronouns =

Practice of using multiple personal pronouns

Rolling pronouns, or rotating pronouns, is the use of multiple personal pronouns that can be used alternately or shift over time. They are usually used by non-binary or otherwise transgender people, and are usually used to signify their connection with their gender identity while affirming their identity.

== Use ==
Rolling pronouns are usually used by non-binary, trans, or gender non-conforming people. Those who use them usually encourage others to rotate or mix them when speaking to or referring to them. The pronouns are meant to signify their connection with their gender identity, while affirming their non-binary identity. Likewise, rolling pronouns are necessary for genderfluid people to affirm their fluctuating gender identity. For instance, writer and podcast host Ada Powers uses she and they pronouns and as expressed: "I identify as a woman, but also as nonbinary. I don't feel womanhood tells my full story, but I'm not fully divested from it, either.". When generalized to languages other than English, rolling grammatical gender is used by languages which maintain strict masculine/feminine grammatical gender, as there is no neuter grammatical gender by which non-binary people can refer to themselves with.

According to the 2020 Gender Census, around a third of transgender and non-binary people preferred to use two sets of pronouns, and over 10% stated that they liked three or even more sets. The LGBTQ Nation magazine has argued that rolling pronouns are becoming more common as a growing amount of young people identified as non-binary. Some use pronounfluid or multipronominal to describe this experience.

== People ==
Notable people who use rolling pronouns include the following:

- Amandla Stenberg (she/they), The Hate U Give actress
- Anjimile (he/they), musical artist
- Arca (she/it/they), musical artist
- Ari Fitz (he/they), model and vlogger
- Ashnikko (she/they), rapper and singer
- Bella Ramsey (any), actor
- Ben Levi Ross (they/he), actor
- Bob the Drag Queen (she/he), participant in RuPaul's Drag Race
- Demi Lovato (they/she), singer and actor
- Dua Saleh (they/xe), singer and actor
- Elliot Page (he/they), Umbrella Academy and Juno actor
- Emma Corrin (she/they), The Crown's actress
- Gerard Way (he/they), My Chemical Romance vocalist
- Gloria Groove (she/he), singer and drag queen
- Halsey (she/they), singer
- Ian Alexander (he/they), Star Trek: Discovery actor
- Janelle Monae (they/she), musician and actor
- Jesse James Keitel (she/they), actor, writer, and artist
- JoJo Siwa (any), singer and dancer
- Jonathan Van Ness (she/they/he), Queer Eye regular
- Kae Tempest (they/he), musical artist and writer
- Kehlani (she/they), singer
- King Princess (any), musician and actor
- Leslie Feinberg (ze/she/he), activist and writer
- Lily Gladstone (she/they), Killers of the Flower Moon and Under the Bridge actress
- Mae Martin (they/she), comedian and actor
- maia arson crimew (it/she), Swiss hacktivist
- Melissa King (she/they), chef
- Morgxn (he/they/xe), musician
- ND Stevenson (any), cartoonist and producer
- NoSo (he/they), musician
- Quintessa Swindell (they/he), actor
- Rahul Kohli (he/they), The Haunting of Bly Manor actor
- Rebecca Sugar (she/they), animator and musician
- Ruby Rose (she/they), actor and model
- Sara Ramirez (she/they), Grey's Anatomy's actress
- Shamir (he/she/they), musician
- Shea Couleé (she/they), drag performer and musician

== See also ==
- Gender pronoun transposition – LGBTQ linguistic phenomenon of switching pronouns
- Neopronoun – Neologistic personal pronoun
- Preferred gender pronoun – Third person individual gender pronouns
