= Dafydd Glyn Jones =

Welsh lexicographer

Dafydd Glyn Jones (born 1941) is a Welsh scholar and lexicographer, born in the village of Carmel, Gwynedd. He is a specialist in Middle Welsh prose, and his other interests include Welsh history, Robert Jones, Rhoslan, and the life and work of Emrys ap Iwan.

He was educated at Carmel Primary School and at Ysgol Dyffryn Nantlle, Penygroes, Gwynedd. He graduated from the University College of North Wales, Bangor and from Linacre College, Oxford.

He spent many years as a lecturer and senior lecturer in Welsh Language and Literature at the University of Wales, Bangor. With his co-editor Bruce Griffiths he edited the Welsh Academy English-Welsh Dictionary (Geiriadur yr Academi). He retired from the university in 2000.

== Bibliography ==
Dafydd Glyn Jones has written a number of articles on subjects connected with Welsh literature and history, e.g.

- Drych yr Amseroedd (The Mirror of the Times) (1987)
- Gwlad y Brutiau (The Land of the Chronicles)) (1990)
- Cyfrinach Ynys Brydain (The Mystery of the Island of Britain) (BBC Wales Annual Lecture, 1992)

A collection of his writings on Welsh history is published in:

- Agoriad yr Oes (A Key to the Age) (Y Lolfa, 2001). ISBN 0-86243-603-6
