= Feminization of language =

Reclassification of gendered nouns and adjectives

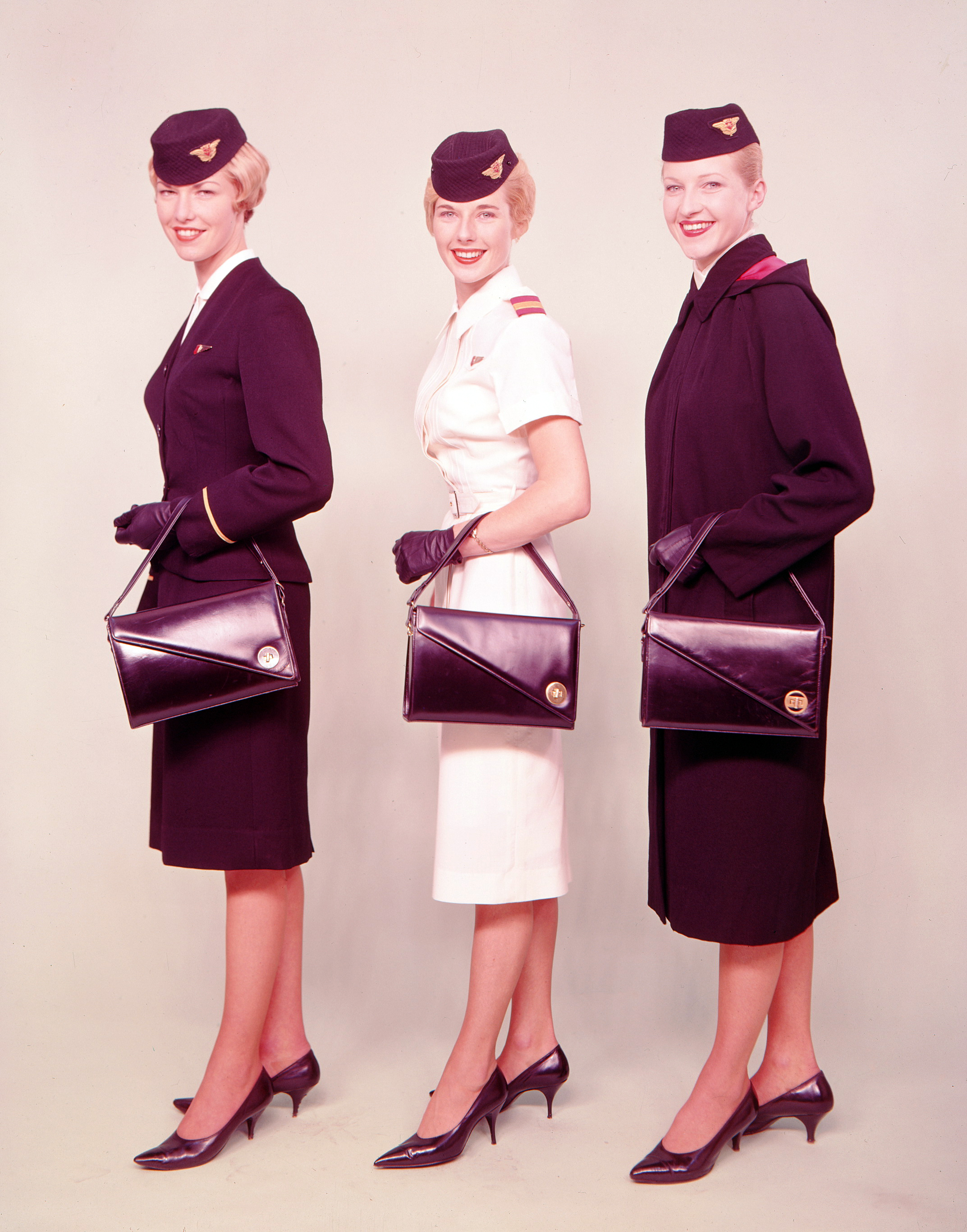
Hostess is the feminized form of the masculine host.

In linguistics, feminization refers to the process of re-classifying nouns and adjectives which as such refer to male beings, including occupational terms, as feminine. This is done most of the time by adding inflectional suffixes denoting a female (such as the standard suffix -ess in English, or its equivalent -a in Spanish).

In some languages with grammatical gender, for example Dutch, there is a tendency to assign the feminine gender to certain – in particular abstract – nouns which are originally masculine or neuter. This also happened to some words in Middle English (which, in contrast to Modern English, had grammatical gender) which denoted virtue and vice. In Modern English, in spite of it being a gender-neutral language, certain non-human things that are usually neuter are still sometimes feminized by way of figure of speech, especially countries and ships (see also Gender in English § Ships, Gender in English § Modern English).

Feminization is also related to neutralization, which is the process of replacing masculine forms of words (i.e. policeman) with gender-unmarked forms (i.e. police officer).

Not to be confused with feminization in sociology, though the two subjects are inter-related.

== In feminist theory ==
Recent efforts to modify the use of the generic masculine have generated controversy and debate. Feminists believe the use of the generic masculine to refer to someone whose gender is unknown erases women and should be abolished.

Furthermore, some see evidence of the intentional preference of the masculine over the feminine. It has been argued that 17th-century grammaticians who wanted to assert male dominance worked to suppress the feminine forms of certain professions, leading to the modern-day rule that prefers the masculine over the feminine in the French language.

There are a number of arguments against such prescriptive rules however. In France, the prime minister at the time, Edouard Philippe, announced a ban on the use of gender-neutral French in official government documentation, arguing that implementing it would complicate education and create little change in the social structure that activists are seeking to change. In response, Minister of Education Jean-Michel Blanquer also tweeted his opinion on the use of inclusive language, saying that “language is a bedrock of life that we owe to children” and that it “must not be instrumentalized, even for the best of causes.”

Research has also shown that, despite the inclusion of feminization to make language more gender equal, possible side effects can affect the recruitment process. Feminine job titles also affect the evaluation of female applications to job positions. Moreover, conservative political attitudes have been linked to a greater devaluation of female applicants with feminine titles compared to liberal attitudes.

Additionally, some argue that feminization may be detrimental because feminine suffixes carry negative connotations. For example, a study found that women who were referred to as professoressa were seen as less persuasive than either a man or women who used the title professore (Italian for the feminine and masculine forms of "professor," respectively.") Another reason feminized language may carry poor conceptions is because many efforts to feminize language are recent and therefore have not yet been accepted by the mass public. Feminized language may thus be used as a way to devalue a woman, especially a working professional (which is so often subject to feminization), by those who seek to prescribe traditional social orders to others.

== In various languages ==
=== French ===
Double gender marking has been demonstrated typographically using the masculine form as the baseline, and then adding a period or hyphen followed by the feminine suffix, such as fier.ère.s or fier-ère-s.

Double gender marking is prevalent in radical political pamphlets and manifestos. This is difficult to track, however, as these types of publications are written by many groups and tend to be published by organizations that do not keep detailed records of their activities.

It has been argued that, due to World War I and the gap in traditional male professions that women were required to fill, many words for professions developed feminine variations. Since then, there has been considerable debate about codifying these changes.

Attempts in France to enact changes in language inclusivity have generated considerable pushback. The French Academy, a prominent council on the French language, has stated that codifying procedures like language feminization would engender "a disunited language, disparate in its expression, creating a confusion that borders on illegibility."

=== Italian ===
Female members of a profession can be referred to with the masculine ending -e (eg. presidente) or the feminine -essa (eg. presidentessa). A 2001 study by Mucchi-Faina and Barro showed that women professionals are more persuasive when using the masculine ending while a 2012 study by Merkel et al. show there was no difference in perception.

=== Russian ===
Noun declension is asymmetrical in Russian. Women can be referred to with suffixes of the first or second declension but men can only be referred to with first declension suffixes.

=== German ===
Man is commonly used to mean 'one' and is frequently used in general statements. It is similar to English indefinite "you" or "one." Feminine job titles are usually created by adding -in to the grammatically masculine word in question. Informatiker (singular or plural). The feminine form is Informatikerin (singular) and Informatikerinnen (plural).

=== Polish ===
A study of the feminized form of diarolog, known as diarolożka (feminine) found that feminization lead to disadvantageous effects for female applicants. Applicants with a feminized job title were evaluated disadvantageously compared to male applicants and female applicants who retained the masculine form of the job title.

== See also ==
- Gender marking in job titles
- Feminism
- Language and gender
- Gender neutrality in languages with grammatical gender
- Feminist theory
- Feminization (sociology)
- Sociolinguistics
