= Welsh Academy English–Welsh Dictionary =

The Welsh Academy English–Welsh Dictionary (Welsh: Geiriadur yr Academi; sometimes colloquially Geiriadur Bruce, 'Bruce's Dictionary') is the most comprehensive English–Welsh dictionary ever published. It is the product of many years' work by the editors Bruce Griffiths and Dafydd Glyn Jones. The dictionary was published in 1995, with a second edition published in September 2003.

The complete volume, comprising over 1700 pages (pp. lxxxi +1710), was published by the University of Wales Press on behalf of the Welsh Academy. It contains a large number of Welsh words and new terms in the fields of science, technology, computing, commerce, education, etc.

== Publishing details ==
- Geiriadur yr Academi (University of Wales Press, 1995; new edition September 2003). ISBN 978-0-7083-1186-8
