= Pronoun game =

Concealing one's sexual orientation from others by using gender neutral pronouns

"Playing the pronoun game" is the act of concealing sexual orientation in conversation by not using a gender-specific pronoun for a partner or a lover, which would reveal the sexual orientation of the person speaking. Someone may employ the pronoun game when conversing with people to whom they have not "come out". In a situation in which revealing one's sexual orientation would have adverse consequences (such as the loss of a job), playing the pronoun game is seen to be a necessary act of concealment.

The pronoun game involves avoiding reference to one's sexual orientation and allowing the listener's assumptions on the matter to prevail. It also involves not drawing the listener's attention to the fact that the sex of a pronoun's antecedent is not being specified. As such, playing the pronoun game involves

- re-phrasing sentences such that they avoid the need for third-person singular sex-specific pronouns (e.g. "We decided to eat out," rather than "She and I decided to eat out."), often using amphilogism, a form of circumlocution (e.g. "The person I was with and I decided to go to the play");
- using gender-neutral language such as "firefighter" rather than "fireman", phrases such as "my partner", "the better half" or "my significant other", or the person's name where it is not gender-specific; and
- using gender-neutral pronouns that have long-since entered common usage, such as singular they, without employing uncommonly used (and thus attention-calling) neopronouns.

== See also ==
- Closeted
- Feminist language reform
- Gender neutrality in languages with grammatical gender
- Gender-neutral pronoun
- Lavender linguistics
