= Neopronoun =

Neologistic personal pronoun

Neopronouns, or xenopronouns, are neologistic third-person personal pronouns beyond those that already exist in a language. In English, neopronouns replace the existing pronouns "he", "she", and "they". Neopronouns are preferred by some non-binary individuals who feel that they provide options to reflect their gender identity more accurately than conventional pronouns.

Neopronouns may be words created to serve as pronouns, such as "ze/hir", or derived from existing words and turned into personal pronouns, such as "fae/faer". Some neopronouns allude to they/them, such as "ey/em", also known as Elverson pronouns.

An online survey by The Trevor Project in 2020 found that 4% of the surveyed LGBTQ youth aged 13–24 used neopronouns.

== History ==
Singular they had emerged by the 14th century as a third-person pronoun, about a century after the plural they, and is first attested in the 14th-century poem William and the Werewolf. Neopronouns were not coined until the 18th century.

One of the first instances of a neopronoun being used was in 1789, when William H. Marshall recorded the use of "ou" as a pronoun.

"Thon" was originally a Scots version of "yon" and means "that" or "that one". In 1858, it was introduced as a gender-neutral pronoun by the American composer Charles Crosby Converse. It was added to the Merriam-Webster Dictionary in 1934 and removed from it in 1961.

"Ze" as a gender-neutral English pronoun dates back to at least 1864.

In 1911, an insurance broker named Fred Pond invented the pronoun set "he'er, his'er and him'er", which the superintendent of the Chicago public-school system proposed for adoption by the school system in 1912, sparking a national debate in the US, with "heer" being added to the Funk & Wagnalls dictionary in 1913.

The Sacramento Bee used the gender-neutral "hir" for 25 years from the 1920s to the 1940s.

In 1970, Mary Orovan invented the pronoun "co/coself", which gained use in a cooperative community in Virginia called the Twin Oaks Community, where it was still in use as of 2011.

In 1996, Kate Bornstein used the pronouns "ze/hir" to refer to a character in their novel Nearly Roadkill. In a 2006 interview, transgender activist Leslie Feinberg included "ze/hir" as a preferred pronoun (along with "she/her" and "he/him", depending on context), stating, "I like the gender neutral pronoun 'ze/hir' because it makes it impossible to hold on to gender/sex/sexuality assumptions about a person you're about to meet or you've just met." The Oxford English Dictionary added an entry for "ze" in 2018 and entries for "hir" and "zir" in 2019.

The term "neopronoun" emerged in the 2010s.

== Noun-self pronouns ==
Noun-self pronouns are a type of neopronoun that involves a word being used as a personal pronoun. Examples of noun-self pronouns include "vamp/vampself", "kitten/kittenself", and "doll/dollself". Noun-self pronouns trace their origins to the early 2010s on the website Tumblr.

== Reception ==
There has been some conflict over neopronouns, with opposition to the idea in both the transgender community and among cisgender people. Many people find them unfamiliar and confusing to use. Some have said that use of neopronouns, especially noun-self pronouns, comes from a position of privilege, makes the LGBTQ community look like a joke, or that the attention placed on neopronouns pulls focus away from larger, more important issues, such as transphobic bullying, the murder of trans people, and suicide.

People who are supportive of neopronouns state that they are helpful for genderqueer individuals to find "something that was made for them", and for neurodivergent people who may struggle with their gender identity. Some magazines and newspapers have published articles on neopronouns that are generally in support of them, detailing how to use them and be supportive of those who do.

== See also ==
- Gender neutrality in languages with gendered third-person pronouns
- LGBTQ linguistics – Study of language used by LGBTQ people
- List of gender identities
- Rolling pronouns – Practice of using multiple personal pronouns
