= Ri (pronoun) =

Singular third-person gender-neutral pronoun in Esperanto

Recording of the song Ri liberas by the French singer Guillaume Armide

Ri (Esperanto pronunciation: [ri], possessive: ria [ˈri.a]) is a singular third-person gender-neutral pronoun in Esperanto intended as an alternative to the gender-specific li ("he") and ŝi ("she"). It is used by some speakers when the gender of a person is not known or when it is not desirable to specify them as either a "he" or "she", similar to how singular they is used in English. In Esperanto, the usage of this pronoun is called riismo ([ri.ˈis.mo], literally "ri-ism"); it is one of several proposals for gender-neutral pronouns in Esperanto.

On 12 May 2020, Marcos Cramer, a member of the Akademio de Esperanto, published an empirical study on the usage of gender-neutral pronouns in Esperanto. The study concludes by saying that the pronoun ri is now much more widely known and used than ten years ago, and that this development is stronger among young people. It found that the pronoun is very widely used when referring to non-binary people (as well as in the Esperanto Wikipedia), but that the usage of the pronoun to refer to a non-specific person is practiced at a considerable level as well.

The pronoun is not officially endorsed by the Akademio de Esperanto, but some members of the academy use it nevertheless. On 24 June 2020 the advisory body of the academy responded to a question on pronouns for non-binary people:

The question touches on a difficult topic, because in Esperanto there is no traditional pronoun for people who identify as not belonging to one of the traditional genders, and so far no expression has been accepted by the entire language community.
The Akademio de Esperanto carefully observes, analyzes and discusses current language evolution and language debates. As a purely advisory body, but in no way decisive, the Lingva Konsultejo cannot now anticipate a recommendation or other decision or interpretation of the Fundamento that may be made by the Academy.

The pronoun has also been used in lyrics by various musicians, most notably in multiple songs by the band La Perdita Generacio.

== Uses ==
The pronoun ri has multiple uses:

- To refer to a generic individual. For example: "Se iu alvenos frue, diru al ri, ke ri atendu, ĝis mi alvenos." ("If someone comes early, tell them that they should wait until I arrive.")
- To refer to someone you do not know without assuming their gender. For example: "Iu postlasis valizon, en kiu estas riaj ŝlosiloj." ("Someone left a suitcase behind with their keys in it.")
- To refer to a person who does not identify with only the male or female gender. For example: "Alekso kaj ria amiko estas ambaŭ neduumaj." ("Alex and their friend are both non-binary.")

== History ==
The precise history of the pronoun ri is unclear; it appears to have been independently created multiple times, since there were not many other options left that both follow the pattern of other pronouns in Esperanto, and did not yet have another meaning in the language.

The first recorded use of the pronoun was in 1976 in the magazine Eĥo of the Danish Esperanto Association, where it was proposed to be used alongside the already existing pronouns li ("he") and ŝi ("she"). Until about 2010, it remained a seldom used experimental word, but after 2010 its use has increased significantly, especially among younger speakers in Western countries, coinciding with similar shifts towards gender-neutral language in various Western cultures.

The Plena Manlibro de Esperanta Gramatiko, an authoritative and extensive book on Esperanto grammar, used to advise against the use of the pronoun, but as of April 2019 it no longer discourages its use. It now describes without prejudice the various ways in which the pronoun is actually used in practice.

== See also ==
- Gender reform in Esperanto
- Gender-neutral language
- Gender-neutral pronoun
  - Pronoun game
- Feminist language planning
- Lavender linguistics
