= Gender ambiguity =

Gender ambiguity may refer to:

== Human gender ==
- Androgyny – Having both male and female characteristics
- Gender fluidity – Non-fixed gender identity
- Gender nonconformity – Non-conventional expression of gender in humans
- Questioning (sexuality and gender) – Process of self-exploration

== Other uses ==
- Grammatical gender § Functions
  - Gender-neutral language – Language avoiding bias towards a sex or social gender
  - Grammatical gender in Spanish § Ambiguous
- Gender of connectors and fasteners § Ambiguous gender

== See also ==
- Ambiguous genitalia
- Androgyny (disambiguation)
- Gender (disambiguation)
- Genderless (disambiguation)
