= List of languages by type of grammatical genders =

This article lists languages depending on their use of grammatical gender and noun genders.

== No grammatical gender ==
Certain language families, such as the Austronesian, Turkic, and Uralic language families, usually have no grammatical genders (see genderless language). Many indigenous American languages (across language families) have no grammatical gender.

Afro-Asiatic

- Hausa (Bauchi and Zaria dialects only)

Austronesian

- Bikol
- Carolinian
- Cebuano
- Chamoru
- Filipino
- Gilbertese
- Ilokano
- Javanese
- Malagasy
- Māori
- Marshallese
- Nauruan
- Niuean
- Palauan
- Rapa Nui
- Samoan
- Sundanese
- Tagalog
- Tahitian
- Tetum
- Tongan
- Tuvaluan
- Visayan

Constructed

- Esperanto (Esperanto has three gendered pronouns, and separate endings to distinguish natural gender, although there is a movement for gender reform in Esperanto.)
- Ido
- Lingua Franca Nova
- Lojban
- Toki Pona

Creoles

- Haitian Creole
- Mauritian Creole
- Sango
- Papiamento language

Dravidian

- Kannada (Three gendered pronouns; no grammatical gender)
- Kurukh (Two gendered pronouns: masculine and non-masculine)
- Malayalam (Three gendered pronouns; no grammatical gender)
- Tamil (Three gendered pronouns; no grammatical gender)

Isolates

- Ainu
- Basque
- Chimariko
- Haida
- Nivkh
- Purépecha
- Warao
- Zuni

Indo-European

- Afrikaans (Afrikaans has three gendered pronouns, but no other grammatical gender, very similar to English.)
- Armenian
- Balochi
- Bengali
- Dhivehi
- English (English does not have gender agreement in adjectives, but it does have gender agreement in pronouns.)
- Kalasha
- Khowar
- Kurdish (Central and Southern Dialects only.)
- Odia
- Ossetic
- Persian

Niger-Congo

- Ewe
- Fula
- Igbo
- Yoruba

Turkic

- Azerbaijani
- Bashkir
- Chuvash
- Crimean Tatar
- Gagauz
- Karachay-Balkar
- Karakalpak
- Kazakh
- Khakas
- Khalaj
- Kumyk
- Kyrgyz
- Nogai
- Salar
- Shor
- Tatar
- Turkish
- Turkmen
- Tuvan
- Uyghur
- Uzbek
- Yakut (Sakha)

Uralic

- Erzya
- Estonian
- Finnish
- Hungarian
- Ingrian
- Karelian
- Khanty
- Komi
- Livonian
- Mansi
- Mari
- Moksha
- Nenets
- Permyak
- Sámi languages
- Udmurt
- Veps
- Votic

Uto-Aztecan

- Comanche
- Nahuatl (certain modern varieties, as well as Classical Nahuatl include distinctions between animate and inanimate nouns)
- Pipil
- Shoshone
- Yaqui

Other

- Aleut (Eskimo-Aleut)
- Carib (Cariban)
- Canela (Macro-Jê)
- Georgian (Kartvelian)
- Greenlandic (Eskimo-Aleut)
- Guarani (Tupian)
- Japanese (Japonic)
- Karuk (Hokan)
- Khmer (Austroasiatic)
- Korean (Koreanic)
- Lao (Kra-Dai)
- Manchu (Tungusic) used vowel harmony in gender inflections.
- Chinese (Sino-Tibetan)
- Miwok (Yok-Utian)
- Mongolian (Mongolic)
- Murle (Nilo-Saharan)
- Newari (different from Nepali) (Sino-Tibetan)
- Nez Perce (Plateau Penutian)
- Pomo (Hokan)
- Rama (Chibchan)
- Southern Quechua (Quechuan)
- Wichita (Caddoan)
- Yurok (Algic)

=== Noun classifiers ===
Some languages without noun class may have noun classifiers instead. This is common in East Asian languages.

- American Sign Language
- Eastern Indo-Aryan languages
  - Bengali
  - Odia
  - Maithili
  - Nepali
  - Khortha
  - Sadri
  - Kurmali
- Munda languages
- Malto (North Dravidian)
- Khasic languages
- Nicobarese languages
- Burmese
- Modern written Chinese (Sino-Tibetan) has gendered pronouns introduced in the 1920s to accommodate the translation of Western literature (see Chinese pronouns), which do not appear in spoken Chinese. Even in written language it doesn't have grammatical gender in the sense of noun class distinctions.
- Fijian (Austronesian)
- Hawaiian (Austronesian) (There is a noun class system but it is flexible and determined by how the arguments in a statement interact with each other. Therefore, it doesn't constitute a grammatical gender. For example, a house is kino ʻō (o class) because you can go into it so "your house" would be "kou hale." However, if you build the house yourself, the possessive would take the kino ʻā form "kāu hale.")
- Indonesian (Austronesian)
- Japanese
- Khmer
- Hmong
- Korean
- Malay (Austronesian)
- Persian (Indo-European)
- Thai
- Vietnamese

== Masculine and feminine ==
Afro-Asiatic

- Afar
- Agaw
- Akkadian
- Amharic
- Ancient Egyptian
- Arabic
- Aramaic
- Beja
- Coptic
- Hebrew
- Maltese
- Oromo
- Saho
- Somali
- South Arabian
- Tamazight (Berber)
- Tuareg
- Maltese

Indo-European

- Breton
- Catalan - although it has the pronoun "ho" which substitutes antecedents with no gender, like a subordinate clause or a neuter demonstrative ("això", "allò"). For example: "vol això" (he wants this)→"ho vol" (he wants it), or "ha promès que vindrà" (he has promised he will come)→"ho ha promès" (he has promised it).
- Cornish
- Corsican
- French
- Friulan
- Galician (with some remains of neuter in the demonstratives isto (this here), iso/isso (this there/that here) and aquilo (that there), which can also be pronouns)
- Hindi
- Irish
- Italian - there is a trace of the neuter in some nouns and personal pronouns. E.g.: singular l'uovo, il dito; plural le uova, le dita ('the egg(s)', 'the finger(s)'), although singulars of the type dito and uovo and their agreements coincide in form with masculine grammatical gender and the plurals conform to feminine grammatical morphology.
- Kashmiri
- Kurdish (only Northern dialect and only in singular nouns and pronouns, not in plural and not in adjectives or verbs; Central or Southern dialects have lost grammatical gender altogether)
- Ladin
- Latvian
- Lithuanian - there is a neuter gender for all declinable parts of speech (most adjectives, pronouns, numerals, participles), except for nouns, but it has a very limited set of forms.
- Manx
- Mirandese - neuter exists in demonstratives “esto”, “esso” and “aqueilho”, and on indefinite pronouns (ex. alguien, someone; naide, no one; nada, nothing).
- Occitan
- Pashto
- Portuguese - there is a trace of the neuter in the demonstratives (isto/isso/aquilo) and some indefinite pronouns.
- Punjabi (see also Punjabi dialects)
- Romani
- Sardinian
- Scottish Gaelic
- Sicilian
- Sindhi
- Spanish - there is a neuter of sorts, though generally expressed only with the definite article lo, used with adjectives denoting abstract categories: lo bueno, or when referring to an unknown object eso.
- Urdu
- Venetian
- Welsh
- Zaza, Tati, Semnani, Sangsari, Gorani language

Other languages

- Alamblak (Sepik)
- Hadza (Language isolate)
- Kalaw Lagaw Ya (Pama-Nyungan)
- Khasi (Austroasiatic)
- Nivaclé (Matacoan)
- Tiwi (Language isolate)

== Common and neuter ==
In these languages, animate nouns are predominantly of common gender, while inanimate nouns may be of either gender.

- Danish (Danish has four gendered pronouns, but only two grammatical genders in the sense of noun classes. See Gender in Danish and Swedish.)
- Dutch (The masculine and the feminine have merged into a common gender in standard Dutch, but a distinction is still made by some when using pronouns, and in Southern-Dutch varieties. See Gender in Dutch grammar.)
- Hittite (The Hittite "common" gender contains nouns that are either masculine or feminine in other Indo-European languages, while the "neuter" gender continues the inherited Indo-European neuter gender.)
- Norwegian (In the Bergen dialect, and in some sociolects of Oslo.)
- Swedish (The distinction between masculine and feminine still exists for people and some animals. Some dialects retain all three genders for all nouns.) (Swedish has four gendered pronouns, but only two grammatical genders in the sense of noun classes. See Gender in Danish and Swedish.)
- West Frisian

== Animate and inanimate ==
- Algic languages
- Basque - the declension of the nominal phrase in the locative cases differs depending on the animacy of the referent; a different and unrelated masculine/feminine distinction is present in the verbal allocutive agreement
- Biak - One of the few Austronesian languages with grammatical gender. The distinction is only maintained in the plural, additionally making Biak a rare exception to Greenberg's linguistical universal 45.
- Chukotko-Kamchatkan languages
- Elamite
- Georgian - different verbs are used in various cases (to put, to take, to have, etc.), while referring to animate or inanimate objects.
- Klingon - Klingon has a noun class for Beings capable of speech vs. everything else. So it could be considered not to be an animate-inanimate distinction, though it resembles one.
- Mapudungun
- Middle Korean
- Nahuatl - In Classical Nahuatl and certain modern varieties, only animate nouns can take a plural form
- Siouan language family
- Sumerian
- Uto-Aztecan languages

In many such languages, what is commonly termed "animacy" may in fact be more accurately described as a distinction between human and non-human, rational and irrational, "socially active" and "socially passive" etc.

== Masculine, feminine, and neuter ==
Indo-European

Proto-Indo-European originally had two genders (animate and inanimate), and later the animate split into masculine and feminine, and the inanimate became neuter.

- Albanian
- Asturian - Masculine, feminine and neuter for uncountable nouns.
- Belarusian *
- Bulgarian
- Czech *
- Dutch - the masculine and the feminine have merged into a common gender in standard Dutch, but a distinction is still made by many when using pronouns. In South-Dutch (Flemish) spoken language all articles, possessives and demonstratives differentiate between masculine and feminine: see gender in Dutch grammar.
- Faroese
- Gaulish
- German
- Greek - in the Attic dialect of Ancient Greek, neuter plurals are treated like singulars in verbal agreement.
- Gujarati
- Icelandic
- Kashubian
- Konkani
- Latin
- Limburgish
- Low German
- Luxembourgish
- Macedonian
- Marathi
- Norwegian - the three-gender system is widely used throughout the country, except in the Bergen dialect (some sociolects in Oslo lack it as well), where the dialect allows feminine nouns to be given the corresponding masculine inflections or do not use the feminine gender at all.
- Old English
- Old Irish
- Old Persian
- Sogdian
- Old Prussian
- Polish *
- Romanian - the neuter gender (called neutru or sometimes ambigen in Romanian) has no separate forms of its own; neuter nouns behave like masculine nouns in the singular, and feminine in the plural. This behavior is seen in the form of agreeing adjectives and replacing pronouns. See Romanian nouns.
- Russian *
- Sanskrit
- Serbo-Croatian *
- Slovak *
- Slovene *
- Sorbian
- Swedish - as in Dutch, the masculine and the feminine have merged into a common gender in standard Swedish. But many dialects, mainly in Dalecarlia, Ostrobothnia (Finland) and northern Sweden, have preserved three genders in spoken language.
- Ukrainian *
- Yiddish

Note: The Slavic languages marked with an asterisk (*) were traditionally recognised as having masculine, feminine and neuter genders only, with animacy as a separate category for the masculine and feminine (in East Slavic languages) or masculine only (elsewhere).

Other

- Ket (Yeniseian)
- Khoekhoe (Khoe)
- Telugu (Dravidian)
- Teso (Nilo-Saharan)

== More than three grammatical genders ==
- Burushaski: masculine, feminine, countable nouns (such as animals), and uncountable nouns (which can refer to abstract nouns, fluids, mass, etc.)
- Chechen: 6 classes (masculine, feminine and 4 other miscellaneous classes)
- Czech, Slovak and Rusyn: Masculine animate, Masculine inanimate, Feminine, Neuter (traditionally, only masculine, feminine and neuter genders are recognized, with animacy as a separate category for the masculine).
- Polish: Masculine personal, Masculine animate, Masculine inanimate, Feminine, Neuter (traditionally, only masculine, feminine and neuter genders are recognized).
- Pama–Nyungan languages including Dyirbal and other Australian languages have gender systems such as: Masculine, feminine (see Women, Fire, and Dangerous Things), vegetable and neuter.
  - Many Australian languages have a system of gender superclassing in which membership in one gender can mean membership in another.
- Worrorra: Masculine, feminine, terrestrial, celestial, and collective.
- Halegannada: Originally had 9 gender pronouns but only 3 exist in present-day Kannada.
- Zande: Masculine, feminine, animate, and inanimate.
- Bantu languages have many noun classes.
  - Rwanda-Rundi family of languages (including Kinyarwanda, Kirundi, and Ha): 16 noun classes grouped in 10 pairs.
  - Ganda: 10 classes called simply Class I to Class X and containing all sorts of arbitrary groupings but often characterised as people, long objects, animals, miscellaneous objects, large objects and liquids, small objects, languages, pejoratives, infinitives, mass nouns
  - Shona: 20 noun classes (singular and plural are considered separate classes)
  - Swahili: 16 noun classes (singular and plural are considered separate classes)
- Tuyuca: Tuyuca has 50–140 noun classes.
- Sepik languages: Sepik languages all distinguish between at least masculine and feminine genders, but some distinguish three or more genders.
