= Anti-sexism (disambiguation) =

Anti-sexism is opposition to sexism.

Anti-sexism may also refer to:

- Pro-feminism, support of the cause of feminism
- Men's rights movement, a movement against sexism towards men

Anti-sex may refer to:

- Antisexualism, opposition or hostility towards sexual behavior and sexuality

== See also ==
- Asexual (disambiguation)
- Asexuality
- Junior Anti-Sex-League, a fictional organization in George Orwell's novel 1984
- Libido
- Rock Against Sexism
- Sexualism
- Anti-discrimination law
