= Gender in Danish and Swedish =

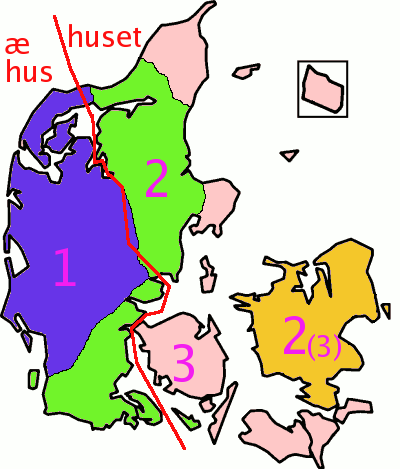
The distribution of one, two, and three grammatical genders in Danish dialects. In Zealand (marked in orange) the transition from three to two genders has happened fairly recently. West of the red line the definite article goes before the word as in English or German; east of the line it takes the form of a suffix.

In standard Danish and Swedish, nouns have two grammatical genders, and pronouns have the same two grammatical genders in addition to two natural genders similar to English.

== Overview ==
Historically, nouns in standard Danish and Swedish, like other Germanic languages, had one of three grammatical genders: masculine, feminine, or neuter. Over time the feminine and masculine genders merged into a common gender. A common gender is also partly used in some variants of Dutch, but in Dutch, the merger is incomplete, with some vestiges in pronouns. Swedish also has deviations from a complete common gender. Danish has no such vestiges since unlike Dutch and German, it does not use the same pronouns for objects and people, but like English, Danish has natural gender personal pronouns for people and separate grammatical gender pronouns for objects and animals.

Standard Danish and Swedish are very similar in regard to noun genders, but many dialects of those languages have different numbers of grammatical genders from one to three. Norwegian, while similar to those languages, uses three genders in its standard versions, but some dialects, like that of Bergen and the Riksmål variety of Bokmål, use two.

== History and dialects ==
Around 1300 CE, Danish had three grammatical genders. Masculine nouns formed definite versions with -in (e.g.: dawin 'the day', hæstin 'the horse'), feminine with -æn (kunæn 'the woman', næsæn 'the nose'), and neuter with either -æt or -it (barnæt 'the child', skipit 'the ship'). In some dialects, like East Jutlandic, Copenhagen and Stockholm, the -in and -æn suffixes merged to -en forms thereby losing the distinction in definite endings between the two. Nonetheless, pronouns continued to distinguish between the grammatical genders for some time, as han referred to nouns of the masculine gender, and likewise hun (Da.) / hon (Swedish) was used for nouns of the feminine gender.

During the early modern period, the last distinction disappeared as well, as inanimate nouns became perceived as lacking biological gender and came to be referred to with a new pronoun den 'it', originally a demonstrative meaning 'that', and han and hun became reserved for beings perceived as having biological gender, like English he and she.

Other dialects have kept the gender distinction in the definite suffixes, like Insular Danish, in which only the feminine suffix became -en while masculine form lost the n and became -i (dawi 'the day', katti 'the cat'), and Norwegian and most Swedish dialects, in which the masculine suffix became -en but the feminine suffix lost the n and became -a (mora 'the mother').

== Grammar ==
=== Pronouns ===
Like in English, the accusative and dative cases are merged to one objective case and is marked only for object pronouns.

	Nominative	Objective	Possessive
Masculine (natural gender)	han	ham / honom	hans
Feminine (natural gender)	hun / hon	hende / henne	hendes / hennes
Common (grammatical gender)	den	den	dens / dess
Neuter (grammatical gender)	det	det	dets / dess

=== Articles ===
North Germanic languages use a definite suffix or enclitic article instead of a definite article unless a preposition is attached to the noun, when a definite article is placed before it. Because they normally attach to common nouns, not proper nouns, they are usually not used for people. The only exceptions are as an epithet or description, when the definite article for the common gender is used.

	Indefinite article	Definite article	Definite suffix
Common gender	en	den	-en \ -an / -en
Neuter	et / ett	det	-et

== Neutral natural gender ==
Using natural genders for people causes a problem to arise in discussing a person of unknown or undefined gender. Traditionally the masculine pronouns have been used in that case, but that has caused some concern about cultural sexism. As a solution some feminists in Sweden have proposed to add a third class of gender-neutral pronouns for people. It is used in some places in Sweden.

The Danish translation is added in parentheses but is not actually used and lacks objective and possessive versions. In 2015, hen was introduced in Svenska Akademiens ordlista, the word list (spelling dictionary) of the Swedish Academy.

	Nominative	Accusative/Dative	Possessive
Neutral (natural gender)	hen (høn)	hen/henom ( - )	hens ( - )

== See also ==
- Danish grammar
- Swedish grammar
- Grammatical gender
- English personal pronouns
- Gender in Dutch grammar
