= Swedish grammar =

Grammar of the Swedish language

Swedish grammar is either the study of the grammar of the Swedish language, or the grammatical system itself of the Swedish language. Swedish is descended from Old Norse. Compared to its progenitor, Swedish grammar is much less characterized by inflection. Modern Swedish has two genders and no longer conjugates verbs based on person or number. Its nouns have lost the morphological distinction between nominative and accusative cases that denoted grammatical subject and object in Old Norse in favor of marking by word order. Swedish uses some inflection with nouns, adjectives, and verbs. It is generally a subject–verb–object (SVO) language with V2 word order.

== Nouns ==
Nouns have one of two grammatical genders: common (utrum) and neuter (neutrum), which determine their definite forms as well as the form of any adjectives and articles used to describe them. Noun gender is largely arbitrary and must be memorized; however, around three quarters of all Swedish nouns are common gender. Living beings are often common nouns, like in en katt "a cat", en häst "a horse", en fluga "a fly", etc. (see also Gender in Danish and Swedish).

Swedish once had three genders—masculine, feminine and neuter. Though the three-gender system is preserved in a number of dialects and traces of it still exist in certain expressions, masculine and feminine nouns have today merged into the common gender in the standard language. A remnant of the masculine gender can still be expressed in the singular definite form of adjectives according to natural gender (male humans), in the same way as personal pronouns, han and hon, are chosen for representing nouns in contemporary Swedish (male/female human beings and optionally animals).

There is a small number of Swedish nouns that can be either common or neuter gender. The database for Svenska Akademiens ordlista 12 contained 324 such nouns.

There are traces of the former four-case system for nouns evidenced in that pronouns still have subject, object (based on the old accusative and dative form) and genitive forms. Nouns make no distinction between subject and object forms, and the genitive is formed by adding -s to the end of a word. This -s genitive functions more like a clitic than a proper case and is nearly identical to the possessive suffix used in English. Note, however, that in Swedish orthography this genitive -s is appended directly to the word and is not preceded by an apostrophe. This does not cause confusion as it would in English because Swedish does not use an "-s" suffix for plurals.

Swedish nouns are inflected for number and definiteness and can take a genitive suffix. They exhibit the following morpheme order:

Noun stem	(Plural ending)	(Definite article)	(Genitive -s)

=== Plural forms ===
Nouns form the plural in a variety of ways. It is customary to classify Swedish nouns into five declensions based on their plural indefinite endings: -or, -ar, -(e)r, -n, and no ending.

- Nouns of the first declension are all of the common gender (historically feminine). The majority of these nouns end in -a in the singular and replace it with -or in the plural. For example: en flicka ("a girl"), flickor ("girls"). A few nouns of the first declension end in a consonant, such as: en våg ("a wave"), vågor ("waves"); en ros ("a rose"), rosor ("roses").
- Nouns of the second declension are also of the common gender (historically masculine), with the exception of ett finger ("a finger"), fingrar ("fingers"). They all have the plural ending -ar. Examples include: en arm ("an arm"), armar ("arms"); en hund ("a dog"), hundar ("dogs"); en sjö ("a lake"), sjöar ("lakes"); en pojke ("a boy"), pojkar ("boys"); en sjukdom ("an illness"), sjukdomar ("illnesses"); en främling ("a stranger"), främlingar ("strangers"). A few second declension nouns have irregular plural forms, for instance: en afton ("an evening"), aftnar ("evenings"); en sommar ("a summer"), somrar ("summers"); en moder or en mor ("a mother"), mödrar ("mothers").
- The third declension includes both common and neuter nouns. The plural ending for nouns of this declension is -er or, for some nouns ending in a vowel, -r. For example: en park ("a park"), parker ("parks"); ett museum ("a museum"), museer ("museums", also loses the Latinate suffix -um); en sko ("a shoe"), skor ("shoes"); en fiende ("an enemy"), fiender ("enemies"). Some third declension nouns modify or shorten their stem vowels due to umlaut in the plural: en hand ("a hand"), händer ("hands"); ett land ("a country"), länder ("countries"); en bok ("a book"), böcker ("books"); en nöt ("a nut"), nötter ("nuts").
- All nouns in the fourth declension are of the neuter gender and end in a vowel in the singular. Their plural ending is -n. For example: ett bi ("a bee"), bin ("bees"); ett äpple ("an apple"), äpplen ("apples"). Two nouns in this declension have irregular plural forms: ett öga ("an eye"), ögon ("eyes"); ett öra ("an ear"), öron ("ears").
- Fifth declension nouns have no plural ending and they can be of common or neuter gender. Examples of these include: ett barn ("a child"), barn ("children"); ett djur ("an animal"), djur ("animals"); en lärare ("a teacher"), lärare ("teachers"). Some fifth declension nouns show umlaut in the plural: en mus ("a mouse"), möss ("mice"); en gås ("a goose"), gäss ("geese"); en man ("a man"), män ("men").

=== Articles and definite forms ===
The definite article in Swedish is mostly expressed by a suffix on the head noun, while the indefinite article is a separate word preceding the noun. This structure of the articles is shared by the Scandinavian languages. Articles differ in form depending on the gender and number of the noun.

The indefinite article, which is only used in the singular, is en for common nouns, and ett for neuter nouns, e.g. en flaska ("a bottle"), ett brev ("a letter"). The definite article in the singular is generally the suffixes -en or -n for common nouns (e.g. flaskan "the bottle"), and -et or -t for neuter nouns (e.g. brevet "the letter"). In most dialects, the final -t of the definite neuter suffix is silent. The definite article in the plural is -na for the first three declensions, -a for the fourth, and -en for the fifth: for example flaskorna ("the bottles"), bina ("the bees"), breven ("the letters").

When an adjective or numeral is used in front of a noun with the definite article, an additional definite article is placed before the adjective(s). This additional definite article is det for neuter nouns, den for common nouns, and de for plural nouns, e.g. den nya flaskan ("the new bottle"), det nya brevet ("the new letter"), de fem flaskorna ("the five bottles"). A similar structure involving the same kind of circumfixing of the definite article around the words här ("here") or där ('there') is used to mean "this" and "that", e.g. den här flaskan ("this bottle"), det där brevet ("that letter") as a demonstrative article.

The five declension classes may be named -or, -ar, -er, -n, and null after their respective plural indefinite endings. Each noun has eight forms: singular/plural, definite/indefinite and caseless/genitive. The caseless form is sometimes referred to as nominative, even though it is used for grammatical objects as well as subjects.

=== Genitive ===
The genitive is always formed by appending -s to the caseless form. In the second, third and fifth declensions words may end with /s/ (spelled -⟨s⟩, -⟨x⟩, or -⟨z⟩) in the caseless form. These words take no extra -s in genitive use: the genitive (indefinite) of hus ("house") is hus. The invisible genitive suffix may however optionally be represented with an apostrophe in writing: hus’. Morpheme boundaries in some forms may be analyzed differently by some scholars.

The Swedish genitive is not considered a case by all scholars today, as the -s is usually put on the last word of the noun phrase even when that word is not the head noun, much like in English usage (e.g. mannen som står där bortas hatt, "the man standing over there's hat"). This use of -s as a clitic rather than a suffix has traditionally been regarded as ungrammatical, but is today dominant to the point where putting an -s on the head noun is considered old fashioned. The Swedish Language Council sanctions putting the ending after fixed, non-arbitrary phrases (e.g. Konungen av Danmarks bröstkarameller, "the King of Denmark's cough drops"); but otherwise they recommend to reformulate in order to avoid the construction altogether.

Some dialects in southwestern Sweden have a so-called a-genitive, which is mainly used with proper nouns. For example, the plain around Lund is called "Lundaslätten".

=== Examples ===
These examples cover all regular Swedish caseless noun forms.

First declension: -or (common gender)

	Singular	Plural
Indefinite	(en) flaska (a) bottle	flaskor bottles
Definite	flaskan the bottle	flaskorna the bottles

Second declension: -ar (common gender)

	Singular	Plural
Indefinite	(en) stol a chair	stolar chairs
Definite	stolen the chair	stolarna the chairs

	Singular	Plural
Indefinite	(en) gubbe (an) old man	gubbar old men
Definite	gubben the old man	gubbarna the old men

Third declension: -er, -r (mostly common gender nouns, some neuter nouns)

	Singular	Plural
Indefinite	(en) sak (a) thing	saker things
Definite	saken the thing	sakerna the things

	Singular	Plural
Indefinite	(en) bakelse (a) pastry	bakelser pastries
Definite	bakelsen the pastry	bakelserna the pastries

	Singular	Plural
Indefinite	(ett) parti (a) political party	partier political parties
Definite	partiet the political party	partierna the political parties

The set of words taking only -r as a marker for plural is regarded as a declension of its own by some scholars. However, traditionally these have been regarded as a special version of the third declension.

Fourth declension: -n (neuter) This is when a neuter noun ends in a vowel.

	Singular	Plural
Indefinite	(ett) hjärta (a) heart	hjärtan hearts
Definite	hjärtat the heart	hjärtana the hearts

Fifth declension: unmarked plural (mostly neuter nouns ending in consonants and common gender nouns ending in certain derivational suffixes)

	Singular	Plural
Indefinite	(ett) horn (a) horn	horn horns
Definite	hornet the horn	hornen the horns

	Singular	Plural
Indefinite	(en) bagare (a) baker	bagare bakers
Definite	bagaren the baker	bagarna the bakers

	Singular	Plural
Indefinite	(en) indier (an) Indian	indier Indians
Definite	indiern the Indian	indierna the Indians

== Pronouns ==
=== Personal pronouns ===
The Swedish personal-pronoun system is almost identical to that of English. Pronouns inflect for person, for number, and, in the third person singular, for gender. Swedish differs, inter alia, in having a separate third-person reflexive pronoun sig ("oneself"/"himself"/"herself"/"itself"/"themselves" – analogous to Latin se and Slavic sę), and distinct 2nd-person singular forms du ("thou") and ni ("you", formal/respectful), and their objective forms, which have all merged to you in English, while the third-person plurals are becoming merged in Swedish instead (see below the table). Some aspects of personal pronouns are simpler in Swedish: reflexive forms are not used for the first and second persons, although själv ("self") and egen/eget/egna ("own") may be used for emphasis, and there are no absolute forms for the possessive.

The Swedish personal pronouns are:

Singular				Plural			
Person	Nominative	Objective	Possessive: com./neut./pl.	Person	Nominative	Objective	Possessive: com./neut./pl.
1st	jag	mig (Note: Pronouns de ("they") and dem ("them") are both usually pronounced dom [ˈdɔmː]) in colloquial speech, while in formal speech, dom may optionally replace just dem. In some dialects (especially in southwestern Sweden and Finland) there is still a separation between the two; de is then commonly pronounced di [ˈdiː]. Also, mig, dig, sig are pronounced as if written mej, dej, sej [ˈmɛj, ˈdɛj, ˈsɛj], and are also sometimes spelled that way in less formal writing or to signal spoken language, but this is not appreciated by everyone.)	min, mitt, mina (Note: These possessive pronouns are inflected similarly to adjectives, agreeing in gender and number with the item possessed. The other possessive pronouns (i.e. those listed singly) are genitive forms that are unaffected by the item possessed.)	1st	vi	oss	vår, vårt, våra
2nd (familiar)	du	dig	din, ditt, dina	2nd (plural or formal sing.)	ni	er	er, ert, era Ers (honorific)
3rd masculine	han	honom	hans	3rd	de	dem	deras
3rd feminine	hon	henne	hennes	3rd	de	dem	deras
3rd gender-neutral (Note: While common and neuter refer to grammatical gender, hen and its inflections are gender-neutral pronoun neologisms used by some to avoid a preference for female or male, when a person's gender is not known, or to refer to people who do not identify their gender as female or male, similarly to the singular they in English. They came into widespread use relatively recently, but since 2010 have appeared frequently in traditional and online media, legal documents, and literature. The use of these words has prompted political and linguistic debate in Sweden, and their use is not accepted by all Swedish speakers. In April 2015, it was added to Svenska Akademiens ordlista, the official spelling dictionary of the Swedish Academy. Style manuals and Swedish Language Council recommend hen over henom as the objective form.)	hen	hen, henom	hens	3rd	de	dem	deras
3rd common	den		dess	3rd	de	dem	deras
3rd neuter	det		dess	3rd	de	dem	deras
3rd indefinite ("one")	man	en	ens	3rd	de	dem	deras
3rd reflexive	—	sig	sin, sitt, sina	3rd reflexive	—	sig	sin, sitt, sina

=== Demonstrative, interrogative, and relative pronouns ===
- den här, det här, de här: this, these (may qualify a noun in the definite form). Literally "the ... here".
- den där, det där, de där: that, those (may qualify a noun in the definite form). Literally "the ... there".
- denne, denna, detta, dessa: this/these (may qualify a noun in the indefinite form).
- som: as, that, which, who (strictly speaking, a subordinating conjunction rather than a pronoun, som is used as an all-purpose relative pronoun whenever possible in Swedish).
- vem: who, whom (interrogative).
- vilken, vilket, vilka: which, what, who, whom, that.
- vad: what.
- vems: whose (interrogative).
- vars: whose (relative).
- när: when.
- då: (Note: då, där, dit, and dädan (then, there, thither, and thence), and any compounds derived from them, are used not only in a demonstrative sense, but also in a relative sense, where English would require the wh- forms when, where, whither and whence.) then, when (relative).
- här, där, var: here, there, where (also form multiple combinations such as varifrån, "where from", and därav, "thereof").
- hit, dit, vart: hither, thither, whither (not archaic as in English).
- vem som helst, vilket som helst, vad som helst, när som helst, var som helst: whoever, whichever, whatever, whenever, wherever, etc.
- hädan, dädan, vadan, sedan: hence, thence, whence, since (the contractions hän and sen are common; these are all somewhat archaic and formal-sounding except for sedan).
- någon, något, några, often contracted to and nearly always said as nån, nåt, nåra: (Note: Animacy is implied by gender in these pronouns: non-neuter implies a person ("-one" or "-body") and neuter implies a thing.) some/any, a few; someone/anyone, somebody/anybody, something/anything (the distinction between some in an affirmative statement and any in a negative or interrogative context is actually a slight difficulty for Swedes learning English).
- ingen, inget, inga: no, none; no one, nobody, nothing.
- annan, annat, andra: other, else.
- någonstans, ingenstans, annanstans, överallt: somewhere/anywhere, nowhere, elsewhere, everywhere; (more formally någonstädes, ingenstädes, annorstädes, allestädes).
- någorlunda, ingalunda, annorlunda: somehow/anyhow, no way, otherwise.
- någonting, ingenting, allting: something/anything, nothing, everything.

== Adjectives ==
Swedish adjectives are declined according to gender, number, and definiteness of the noun.

=== Strong inflection ===
In singular indefinite, the form used with nouns of the common gender is the undeclined form, but with nouns of the neuter gender a suffix -t is added. In plural indefinite an -a suffix is added irrespective of gender. This constitutes the strong adjective inflection, characteristic of Germanic languages:

	Singular	Plural
Common	en stor björn, "a large bear"	stora björnar, "large bears"
Neuter	ett stort lodjur, "a large lynx"	stora lodjur, "large lynxes"

In standard Swedish, adjectives are inflected according to the strong pattern, by gender and number of the noun, in complement function with är, "is/am/are", such as

lodjuret är skyggt, "the lynx is shy", and
björnarna är bruna, "the bears are brown".

In some dialects of Swedish, the adjective is uninflected in complement function with är, so becoming

lodjuret är skygg, "the lynx is shy", and
björnarna är brun, "the bears are brown".

=== Weak inflection ===
In the definite form, (meaning the + adjective), there is an -a suffix no matter the case or number of the noun:

	Singular	Plural
Common	den stora björnen, "the large bear"	de stora björnarna, "the large bears"
Neuter	det stora lodjuret, "the large lynx"	de stora lodjuren, "the large lynxes"

This form is also used with possessive adjectives (my, your, his, her, our, their, or in Swedish min/mitt/mina, etc. ), resulting in min gula bil (my yellow car) and ditt stora hus (your large house).

The sole exception to this -a suffix occurs when nouns can be replaced with "he" or "him" (in Swedish han or honom). In this case, the adjectives take the -e ending. Colloquially, however, the usual -a ending is possible in these cases in some Swedish dialects:

	Singular	Plural
Nat. masc., alt. I	den store mannen, "the large man"	de stora männen, "the large men"
Nat. masc., alt. II	den stora mannen, "the large man"	de stora männen, "the large men"

This is called a weak adjective inflection and originates from a Proto-Germanic nominal derivation of the adjectives. This was not always the case, cf. Proto-Germanic adjectives

=== Comparatives and superlatives ===
Adjectives with comparative and superlative forms ending in -are and -ast, which is a majority, also, and so by rule, use the -e suffix for all persons on definite superlatives: den billigaste bilen ("the cheapest car"). Another instance of -e for all persons is the plural forms and definite forms of adjectival verb participles ending in -ad: en målad bil ("a painted car") vs. målade bilar ("painted cars") and den målade bilen ("the painted car").

== Adverbs ==
Adjectival adverbs are formed by putting the adjective in the neuter singular form. Adjectives ending in -lig may take either the neuter singular ending or the suffix -en, and occasionally -ligen is added to an adjective not already ending in -lig.

Common	Neuter	Adverb
tjock, "thick"	tjockt, "thick"	tjockt, "thickly"
snabb, "fast"	snabbt, "fast"	snabbt, "fast"
avsiktlig, "intentional"	avsiktligt, "intentional"	avsiktligen, "intentionally"
stor, "great, large"	stort, "great, large"	storligen, "greatly" i stort sett, "largely"

=== Directional adverbs ===
Adverbs of direction in Swedish show a distinction that is often lacking in English: some have different forms depending on whether one is heading that way, or already there. For example:

Jag steg upp på taket. Jag arbetade där uppe på taket.
I climbed up on the roof. I was working up on the roof.

Heading that way	Already there	English
upp	uppe	up
ner	nere	down
in	inne	in, into
ut	ute	out, out of
hem	hemma	home
bort	borta	away
fram	framme	forward

== Numerals ==
=== Cardinal numbers ===
The cardinal numbers from zero to twelve in Swedish are:

0	1	2	3	4	5	6	7	8	9	10	11	12
noll	en, ett	två	tre	fyra	fem	sex	sju	åtta	nio	tio	elva	tolv

The number 1 is the same as the indefinite article, and its form (en or ett) depends on the gender of the noun that it modifies.

The Swedish numbers from 13 to 19 are:

13	14	15	16	17	18	19
tretton	fjorton	femton	sexton	sjutton	arton (aderton)	nitton

The form aderton is archaic, and is nowadays only used in poetry and some official documents. It is still common in Finland Swedish.

The numbers for multiples of ten from 20 to 1000 are:

20	30	40	50	60	70	80	90	100	1000
tjugo	trettio	fyrtio	femtio	sextio	sjuttio	åttio	nittio	(ett) hundra	(ett) tusen

In some dialects, numbers are not always pronounced the way they are spelled. With the numbers nio (9), tio (10) and tjugo (20), the -o is often pronounced as -e, e.g. [ˈɕʉ̂ːɡɛ]. In some northern dialects it is pronounced as a -u ([ˈɕʉ̂ːɡʉ]), and in some middle dialects as an -i ([ˈɕʉ̂ːɡɪ]). In spoken language, tjugo usually drops the final syllable when compounded with another digit and is pronounced as tju- + the digit, e.g. tjugosju (27) may be pronounced [ɕʉˈɧʉː]. Words ending in -io (trettio, fyrtio, etc.) are most often pronounced without the final -o; the y in fyrtio (40) is always pronounced as ö: [ˈfœ̌ʈːɪ].

Numbers between 21 and 99 are written in the following format:

(big number)(small number)

For example:

22 – tjugotvå
79 – sjuttionio
63 – sextiotre
48 – fyrtioåtta
31 – trettioett
(345 – trehundrafyrtiofem)

The ett preceding hundra (100) and tusen (1000) is optional, but in compounds it is usually required.

Higher numbers include:

10 000	tiotusen
100 000	hundratusen
1 000 000	en miljon
10 000 000	tio miljoner
100 000 000	(ett) hundra miljoner
1 000 000 000	en miljard (Note: Swedish uses the long scale for large numbers.)

The cardinal numbers from miljon and larger are true nouns and take the -er suffix in the plural. They are separated in written Swedish from the preceding number.

Any number can be compounded by simply joining the relevant simple cardinal number in the same order as the digits are written. Written with digits, a number is separated with a space between each third digit from the right. The same principle is used when a number is written with letters, although using letters becomes less common the longer the number is. However, round numbers, like tusen, miljon and miljard are often written with letters as are small numbers (below 20).

	Written form	In components (do not use in written Swedish)
21	tjugoett / tjugoen	(tjugo-ett) / (tjugo-en)
147	etthundrafyrtisju etthundrafyrtiosju	(ett-hundra-fyrtio-sju)
1 975	ettusen niohundrasjuttifem ettusen niohundrasjuttiofem	(ett-tusen nio-hundra-sjuttio-fem)
10 874	tiotusen åttahundrasjuttifyra tiotusen åttahundrasjuttiofyra	(tio-tusen åtta-hundra-sjuttio-fyra)
100 557	etthundratusen femhundrafemtisju etthundratusen femhundrafemtiosju	(ett-hundra-tusen fem-hundra-femtio-sju)
1 378 971	en miljon trehundrasjuttiåtta tusen niohundrasjuttiett en miljon trehundrasjuttioåtta tusen niohundrasjuttioett	(en miljon tre-hundra-sjuttio-åtta tusen nio-hundra-sjuttio-ett)

The decimal point is written as , (comma) and spelled and pronounced komma. The digits following the decimal point may be read individually or as a pair if there are only two. When dealing with monetary amounts (usually with two decimals), the decimal point is read as och, i.e. "and": 3,50 (tre och femtio), 7,88 (sju och åttioåtta).

=== Ordinal and rational numbers ===
Ordinals from "first" to "twelfth":

1st	2nd	3rd	4th	5th	6th	7th	8th	9th	10th	11th	12th
1:a	2:a	3:e	4:e	5:e	6:e	7:e	8:e	9:e	10:e	11:e	12:e
första	andra	tredje	fjärde	femte	sjätte	sjunde	åttonde	nionde	tionde	elfte	tolfte

Those from "thirteenth" to "nineteenth", as well as "hundredth" and "thousandth", are formed from cardinal numerals with the suffix -de, e.g. trettonde (13:e), fjortonde (14:e), hundrade (100:e), tusende (1000:e).

Ordinals for the multiples of ten ("twentieth" to "ninetieth") are formed from cardinal numerals with the suffix -nde, e.g. tjugonde (20:e), trettionde (30:e).

Ordinals for higher numbers are formed from cardinal numerals with the suffix -te, e.g. miljonte ("millionth"). There is no ordinal for miljard ("billion").

Rational numbers are read as the cardinal number of the numerator followed by the ordinal number of the denominator compounded with del or, if the numerator is higher than one, delar ("part(s)"). For those ordinal numbers that are three syllables or longer and end in -de, that suffix is usually dropped in favour of -del(ar). There are a few exceptions.

1/2	en halv ("one half")
1/3	en tredjedel
3/4	tre fjärdedelar
2/5	två femtedelar
5/6	fem sjättedelar
4/7	fyra sjundedelar
1/8	en åttondel or en åttondedel
8/9	åtta niondelar or åtta niondedelar
1/10	en tiondel or en tiondedel
1/11	en elftedel
1/12	en tolftedel
1/13	en trettondel or en trettondedel
1/14	en fjortondel or en fjortondedel
1/15	en femtondel or en femtondedel
1/16	en sextondel or en sextondedel
1/17	en sjuttondel or en sjuttondedel
1/18	en artondel or en artondedel
1/19	en nittondel or en nittondedel
1/20	en tjugondel or en tjugondedel

== Verbs ==
Verbs do not inflect for person or number in modern standard Swedish. They inflect for the present and past tense and the imperative, subjunctive, and indicative mood. Other tenses are formed by combinations of auxiliary verbs with infinitives or a special form of the participle called the supine. In total there are six spoken active-voice forms for each verb: infinitive, imperative, present, preterite/past, supine, and past participle. The only subjunctive form widely used in everyday speech is vore, the past subjunctive of vara ("to be"). It is used as one way of expressing the conditional ("would be", "were"), but is optional. Except for this form, subjunctive forms are considered archaic or dialectal.

Verbs may also take the passive voice. It is formed for any verb tense by appending -s to the tense. For verbs ending in -r, the -r is actually replaced by the -s altogether. Verbs ending in -er often lose the -e- as well, other than in very formal style: stärker ("strengthens") becomes stärks or stärkes ("is strengthened"); exceptions are monosyllabic verbs and verbs where the root ends in -s. Swedish uses the passive voice more frequently than English.

=== Conjugating verbs ===
Swedish verbs are divided into four groups:

Group	Description
1	regular -ar verbs
2	regular -er verbs
3	short verbs, ending in -r
4	strong and irregular verbs, ending in -er or -r

About 80% of all verbs in Swedish are group 1 verbs, which is the only productive verb group. Swenglish variants of English verbs can be made by adding -a to the end of an English verb, sometimes with minor spelling changes; the verb is then treated as a group 1 verb. Examples of modern loan words within the field are chatta and surfa. Swenglish variants that may be used but are not considered standard Swedish include maila/mejla ([ˈmɛ̂jla], "to email" or "mail") and savea/sejva ([ˈsɛ̂jva], "to save").

The stem of a verb is based on the present tense of the verb. If the present tense ends in -ar, the -r is removed to form the stem, e.g., kallar → kalla-. If the present tense ends in -er, the -er is removed, e.g., stänger → stäng-. For short verbs, the -r is removed from the present tense of the verb, e.g., syr → sy-. The imperative is the same as the stem.

- For group 1 verbs, the infinitive is the same as the stem (-a), the present tense ends in -r, the past tense in -de, the supine in -t, and the past participle in -d, -t, and de.
- For group 2 verbs, the stem ends in a consonant, the infinitive ends in -a, and the present tense in -er. Group 2 verbs are further subdivided into group 2a and 2b, depending on whether the stem ends in a voiced or a voiceless consonant (phonetically the same as English). For group 2a verbs, the past tense ends in -de and the past participle in -d, -t, and -da; e.g. the stem of störa ("to disturb") is stör-, and as r is a voiced consonant the past tense ends in -de, that is störde. For group 2b verbs, the past tense ends in -te and the past participle in -t, -t, and -ta; e.g. the past tense of heta ("to be called") is hette.
- For group 3 verbs, the stem ends in a vowel that is not -a, the infinitive is the same as the stem, the present tense ends in -r, the past tense in -dde, the supine in -tt, and the past participle in -dd, -tt, and -dda.
- Group 4 regroups strong and irregular verbs, comprising multiple commonly used verbs. For strong verbs, the stem vowel changes for the past and often the supine, following a definite pattern, e.g. stryka follows the u/y, ö, u pattern (see table below for conjugations). As of lately, an increasing number of verbs formerly conjugated with a strong inflection has been subject to be conjugated with its weak equivalent form in colloquial speech. Irregular verbs, such as vara ("to be"), follow no pattern.

Group	Stem	Imperative	Infinitive		Present		Preterite/Past		Supine		Past participle		English
1	kalla-	kalla!	kalla	—	kallar	-r	kallade	-de	kallat	-t	kallad kallat kallade	-d -t -de	to call
2a	stäng-	stäng!	stänga	-a	stänger	-er	stängde	-de	stängt	-t	stängd stängt stängda	-d -t -da	to close
2b	läs-	läs!	läsa	-a	läser	-er	läste	-te	läst	-t	läst läst lästa	-t -t -ta	to read
3	sy-	sy!	sy	—	syr	-r	sydde	-dde	sytt	-tt	sydd sytt sydda	-dd -tt -dda	to sew
4	stryk-	stryk!	stryka	-a	stryker	-er	strök	(Note: often a new vowel)	strukit	-it	struken struket strukna	-en -et -na	to strike out to iron to stroke
irregular	var-	var!	vara		är		var		varit		—		to be

=== Examples of tenses with English translations ===
Tense	English	Swedish
Infinitive	to work	(att) arbeta
Present tense	I work	jag arbetar
Past tense, imperfect	I worked	jag arbetade
Past tense, perfect	I have worked	jag har arbetat
Future tense	I will/shall work	jag ska arbeta

The irregular verb gå

Tense	English	Swedish
Infinitive	to walk	(att) gå
Present tense	I walk	jag går
Past tense, imperfect	I walked	jag gick
Past tense, perfect	I have walked	jag har gått
Future tense	I will walk	jag ska gå

As in all Germanic languages, strong verbs change their vowel sounds in the various tenses. For most Swedish strong verbs that have a verb cognate in English or German, that cognate is also strong. For example, "to bite" is a strong verb in all three languages as well as Dutch:

Language	Infinitive	Present	Preterite/past	Supine/perfect	Past participle
Swedish	bita	jag biter	jag bet	jag har bitit	biten, bitet, bitna
Dutch	bijten	ik bijt	ik beet	ik heb gebeten	gebeten
German	beißen	ich beiße	ich biss	ich habe gebissen	gebissen
English	to bite	I bite	I bit	I have bitten	bitten

=== Supine form ===
The supine (supinum) form is used in Swedish to form the composite past form of a verb. For verb groups 1–3 the supine is identical to the neuter form of the past participle. For verb group 4, the supine ends in -it while the past participle's neuter form ends in -et. Clear pan-Swedish rules for the distinction in use of the -et and -it verbal suffixes were codified with the first official Swedish Bible translation, completed 1541.

This is best shown by example:

Simple past: "I ate (the) dinner" – jag åt maten (using preterite)
Composite past: "I have eaten (the) dinner" – jag har ätit maten (using supine)
Past participle common: "(the) dinner is eaten" – maten är äten (using past participle)
Past participle neuter: "(the) apple is eaten" – äpplet är ätet
Past participle plural: "(the) apples are eaten" – äpplena är ätna

The supine form is used after ha ("to have"). In English this form is normally merged with the past participle, or the preterite, and this was formerly the case in Swedish, too (the choice of -it or -et being dialectal rather than grammatical); however, in modern Swedish, they are separate, since the distinction of -it being supine and -et being participial was standardised.

=== Passive voice ===
The passive voice in Swedish is formed in one of four ways:

1. adding an -s to the infinitive form of the verb (s-passive); this form tends to focus on the action itself rather than the result of it;
2. using a form of bli ("to become") + the perfect participle (bli-passive); this form stresses the change caused by the action;
3. using a form of vara ("to be") + the perfect participle (vara-passive); this form puts the result of the action in the center of interest;
4. using a form of få ("to get") + the perfect participle (analogous to English get-passive); this form is used when you want to use a subject other than the "normal" one in a passive clause.

Examples:

1. Dörren målas. – "The door is being painted", i.e. someone is performing the action of painting the door at this moment.
2. Dörren blir målad. – "The door is being (becoming) painted", i.e. in a new colour, or it wasn't painted before (the action is not necessarily occurring at this moment).
3. Dörren är målad. – "The door is painted", i.e. it is not unpainted (state).
4. Han fick dörren målad. – "He got the door painted." In English you could say: "the door was painted for him", but if you want he to be the subject you need to use this structure, which is shared by Swedish. English can use to have for to get here (he had the door...), which is not possible in Swedish.

=== Subjunctive mood ===
The subjunctive mood is rarely used in modern Swedish and is limited to a few fixed expressions like leve kungen, "long live the king". Present subjunctive is formed by adding the -e ending to the stem of a verb:

Infinitive	Present tense indicative	Present tense subjunctive
att tala, "to speak"	talar, "speak(s)"	tale, "may speak"
att bli, "to become"	blir, "become(s)"	blive, "may become" (the -v- comes from the older form bliva)
att skriva, "to write"	skriver, "write(s)"	skrive, "may write"
att springa, "to run"	springer, "run(s)"	springe, "may run"

Infinitive	Past tense indicative	Supine indicative	Past tense subjunctive
att finnas, "to exist (be)"	fanns, "existed (there was)"	funnits, "has existed (there has been)"	om det funnes tid, "if only there were time" (changes past tense -a- to supine -u-)
att bli, "to become"	blev, "became"	blivit, "have/has become"	om det bleve så, "if only it became so" (regular: just appends -e to the past tense)
att skriva, "to write"	skrev, "wrote"	skrivit, "written"	om jag skreve ett brev, "if I should write a letter" (regular: appends -e)

=== Historical plural forms ===
In Swedish, the verbs used to conjugate similarly to modern Icelandic. In less formal Swedish the verbs started to lose their inflection regarding person already during the 16th century. The singular–plural distinction survived a bit longer, but came gradually out of use. In very formal language, the special plural forms appeared occasionally as late as the 1940s.

The plural forms are still found in historic texts and might thus have some importance. However, modern Swedish does not inflect verbs (except for tense), and the plural forms are archaic.

In the present tense, the plural was almost always the same as the infinitive. The only major exception was äro (vi äro, "we are"). In the past tense, all weak verbs had the same form in singular and plural. The strong verbs appended an -o to the end form the plural. For some groups of strong verbs the plural also used another vowel than the singular. The group i-a-u is a good example.

Infinitive	Present tense singular	Present tense plural	Past tense singular	Past tense plural
att arbeta, "to work"	arbetar, "work(s)" (sing.)	arbeta, "work" (plur.)	arbetade, "worked" (sing.)	arbetade, "worked" (plur.) (Note: weak verb: same form in past tense singular and plural)
att leka, "to play (games)"	leker, "play(s)" (sing.)	leka, "play" (plur.)	lekte, "played" (sing.)	lekte, "played" (plur.)
att bo, "to live (dwell)"	bor, "live(s)" (sing.)	bo, "live" (plur.)	bodde, "lived" (sing.)	bodde, "lived" (plur.)
att falla, "to fall"	faller, "fall(s)" (sing.)	falla, "fall" (plur.)	föll, "fell" (sing.)	föllo, "fell" (plur.) (Note: strong verb, no vowel change: appends -o)
att finnas, "to exist (be)"	finns, "exists (there is)" (sing.)	finnas, "exist (there are)" (plur.)	fanns, "existed (there were/was)" (sing.)	funnos, "existed (there were)" (plur.) (Note: strong verb, vowel change: supine vowel, appends -o)

== Prepositions ==
Unlike in more conservative Germanic languages (e.g. German), putting a noun into a prepositional phrase does not alter its inflection, case, number or definiteness in any way, except in a very small number of set phrases.

=== Prepositions of location ===
Preposition	Meaning	Example	Translation
på	on, upon	Råttan dansar på bordet.	The rat dances on the table.
under	under	Musen dansar under bordet.	The mouse dances under the table.
i	in	Kålle arbetar i Göteborg.	Kålle works in Gothenburg.
vid	by	Jag är vid sjön.	I am by the lake.
till	to	Ada har åkt till Göteborg.	Ada has gone to Gothenburg.

=== Prepositions of time ===
Preposition	Meaning	Example	Translation
på	at	Vi ses på rasten.	See you at the break.
före	before	De var alltid trötta före rasten.	They were always tired before the break.
om	in	Kan vi ha rast om en timme?	May we have a break in an hour?
i	for	Kan vi ha rast i en timme?	May we have a break for an hour?
på	for (in a negative statement)	Vi har inte haft rast på två timmar.	We have not had a break for two hours.
under	during	Vi arbetade under helgdagarna.	We worked during the holidays.

=== Ambipositions ===
The general rule is that prepositions are placed before the word they are referring to. However, there are a few so-called ambipositions that may appear on either side of the head:

Adposition	Meaning	Succeeding adposition (postposition)	Preceding adposition (preposition)	Translation
runt	around	riket runt	runt riket	around the kingdom
emellan	between	bröder emellan	emellan bröder	between brothers
igenom	through	natten igenom	igenom natten	through the night

== Syntax ==
Being a Germanic language, Swedish shows similarities in syntax to both English and German. All three languages have a subject–verb–object basic word order, but Swedish sides with English in keeping this order also in Dependent clauses (where German puts the verb last). Like German, Swedish utilizes verb-second word order in main clauses, for instance after adverbs, adverbial phrases, and dependent clauses. Adjectives generally precede the noun they determine, though the reverse is not infrequent in poetry. Nouns qualifying other nouns are almost always compounded on the fly; the last noun is the head.

A general word-order template may be drawn for a Swedish sentence, where each part, if it does appear, appears in this order.

Main clause
Fundament	Finite verb	Subject (if not fundament)	Clausal adverb/negation	Non-finite verb (in infinitive or supine)	Object(s)	Spatial adverb	Temporal adverb

Subordinate clause
Conjunction	Subject	Clausal adverb/Negation	Finite Verb	Non-finite verb (in infinitive or supine)	Object(s)	Spatial adverb	Temporal adverb

The "fundament" can be whatever constituent that the speaker wishes to topicalize, emphasize as the topic of the sentence. In the unmarked case, with no special topic, the subject is placed in the fundament position. Common fundaments are an adverb or object, but it is also possible to topicalize basically any constituent, including constituents lifted from a subordinate clause into the fundament position of the main clause: honom vill jag inte att du träffar (lit. "him want I not that you meet", i.e. "I don't want you to meet him") or even the whole subordinate clause: att du följer honom hem accepterar jag inte ("that you follow him home I do not accept"). An odd case is the topicalization of the finite verb, which requires the addition of a "dummy" finite verb in the V2 position, so that the same clause has two finite verbs: arbetade gjorde jag inte igår ("worked did I not yesterday").
