= Genderless =

Genderless may refer to:

- Agender, an identity for people who do not identify with any gender
- Gender neutrality, avoiding distinguishing based on gender
- Gender-neutral pronoun, a pronoun not associated with a particular gender
- Genderless fashion in Japan, a Japanese fashion subculture
- Genderless language, a natural or constructed human language that has no category of grammatical gender
- Gonadal dysgenesis, or absolute genderless; individuals born without functional sex glands
- Unisex, designating items or facilities for persons regardless of gender

== See also ==
- Intersex
- Gender ambiguity
- Sexlessness (disambiguation)
