= Sexlessness =

Sexlessness is the state of being either without sexual activity, or without a biological sex. It may refer to:

- Asexuality, the lack of sexual attraction to others, or low or absent interest in or desire for sexual activity
- Prepubescence, the time in life before one is capable of sexual reproduction
- Sexual abstinence, the practice of refraining from some or all aspects of sexual activity
- Celibacy, the state of voluntarily being unmarried, sexually abstinent, or both
- Incels, a controversial online subculture of "involuntary celibates"
- Sexless marriage, a marital union in which little or no sexual activity occurs between the two spouses
- Gonadal agenesis, when a male child is born without gonads and consequently develops no testes
- Aphallia, a congenital malformation in which the phallus (penis or clitoris) is absent
- Genital nullification, a surgical procedure that entirely removes the genitals
- Turner syndrome, monosomy in which someone lacks an additional X chromosome

== See also ==
- Asexual (disambiguation)
- Genderless (disambiguation)
