= Genderless language =

Language that has no distinctions of grammatical gender

A genderless language is a natural or constructed language that has no distinctions of grammatical gender—that is, no categories requiring morphological agreement for gender between nouns and associated pronouns, adjectives, articles, or verbs.

The notion of a "genderless language" is distinct from that of gender-neutral language, which is neutral with regard to natural gender. A discourse in a genderless language does not need to be gender-neutral (although genderless languages exclude many possibilities for reinforcement of gender-related stereotypes); similarly, a gender-neutral discourse does not need to take place in a genderless language.

Genderless languages do have various means to recognize natural gender, such as gender-specific words (mother, son, etc., and distinct pronouns such as he and she in some cases), as well as gender-specific context, both biological and cultural.

Genderless languages are listed at list of languages by type of grammatical genders. Genderless languages include all the Kartvelian languages (including Georgian), some Indo-European languages (such as Bengali, Persian, Sorani Kurdish and Armenian), all the Uralic languages (such as Hungarian, Finnish and Estonian), all the modern Turkic languages (such as Turkish, Tatar, Kyrgyz, Uzbek, and Kazakh), Chinese, Japanese, Korean, most Austronesian languages (such as the Polynesian languages), some Indigenous languages of the Americas (such as Cherokee), and Vietnamese.

== Language contact ==
Through language contact, some words that are originally part of a genderless system develop a grammatical gender.

There are two primary ways linguists currently classify and understand this process as occurring: the first is through language contact impacting a language independent of borrowings, and the second is explicitly in the context of loanwords or borrowings.

=== Language contact ===
Grammatical gender may arise or be lost due to language contact.

A survey of gender systems in 256 languages around the world show that 112 (44%) have grammatical gender and 144 (56%) are genderless. Since the languages studied in this case were geographically close to each other, there is a significant chance that one language has influenced others. For example, the Basque language is considered a genderless language, but it has been influenced by the Spanish feminine-masculine two-gender system.

== See also ==
- Gender neutrality in genderless languages
- Gender neutrality in languages with grammatical gender
- Grammatical gender
- Gender-neutral pronoun
- Lavender linguistics
