= Asexual =

Asexual or Asexuals may refer to:

- Asexual reproduction
- Asexuality, the lack of sexual attraction to anyone or lack of interest in or desire for sexual activity
  - Gray asexuality, the spectrum between asexuality and sexuality
- Asexuals (band), a Canadian punk rock band

== See also ==
- Sexlessness (disambiguation)
