= Androgyny (disambiguation) =

Androgyny can refer to either a combining of both sexes, or a lack of both. For plants and flowers, see Hermaphroditism in plants and Plant sexuality.

Androgyny, Androgynous, or Androgynos may also refer to:

- "Androgynous" (song), by The Replacements
- "Androgyny" (song), a 2001 song by Garbage
- Androgynos (Judaism), someone who possesses male and female attributes in Halachic law
- Androgynos (mythology), creature in Greek mythology
