= Gender in Dutch grammar =

Explanation of gender of Dutch words

In the Dutch language, the gender of a noun determines the articles, adjective forms and pronouns that are used in reference to that noun. Gender is a complicated topic in Dutch, because depending on the geographical area or each individual speaker, there are either three genders in a regular structure or two genders in a dichotomous structure (neuter/common with vestiges of a three-gender structure). Both are identified and maintained in formal language.

== Overview ==
Traditionally, nouns in Dutch, like in more conservative Germanic languages, such as German and Icelandic, have retained the three grammatical genders found in the older forms of all Germanic languages: masculine, feminine, or neuter. Almost all Dutch speakers maintain the neuter gender, which has distinct adjective inflection, definite article and some pronouns. The picture is less clear for the masculine and feminine gender, because in the standard language the adjective inflection of both is identical, and both share the same article and the same demonstrative pronouns. There are clearer grammatical differences in the definite articles in the genitive (masculine des vs feminine der), demonstrative determiners (masculine diens vs feminine dier) and relative pronouns (masculine wiens vs feminine wier), but usage of those is mostly limited to formal or literary language. The standard language mostly distinguishes masculine and feminine genders of animate nouns by the use of the personal pronoun, which are hij/hem for masculine nouns and zij/haar for feminine nouns and by corresponding possessive pronouns, zijn/zijne for masculine nouns and haar/hare for feminine nouns; all of those have additional unstressed reduced forms. It is also distinguished in the case forms of the definite article and some pronouns, but those have fallen out of use and are only retained in literary or archaic usage and fixed expressions.

In Belgium and southern dialects of the Netherlands, the distinction between the three genders is usually, but not always, maintained, and can be told from articles, adjectives and demonstrative pronouns. As a consequence, many speakers in these regions are still aware of the traditional genders and will, in standard language, also (and equally correctly) refer to words that were traditionally feminine with zij, whereas traditionally masculine words retain the use of hij. In the case of persons and animals of known sex the pronouns used are generally determined by the biological sex rather than by the grammatical gender of the word.

In most remaining parts of the Netherlands and in Suriname, the distinction between masculine and feminine nouns has disappeared, producing a common gender that uses the same inflections and pronouns as the original masculine. The pronouns hij and zij are used when the referent has a natural gender, so hij is used for a male person, zij for a female person. However, when the noun is inanimate and has no natural gender, the pronoun hij is used not only for traditionally masculine nouns, but for traditionally feminine nouns as well. Thus, the situation in these areas resembles that of English, although there is still a distinction among inanimate nouns between common hij and neuter het (English uses it for both, having lost all gender distinctions in almost all inanimate nouns, with few exceptions such as watercraft, aircraft, buildings and countries).

== The standard language ==
In the written tradition, which forms the base for the (prescribed) standard language, there are some remains of the traditional three genders. The following table shows the use of various articles and pronouns in the standard form of Dutch, as well as how the use of gender in the two language areas aligns with this. In areas maintaining the three genders, there is no common gender. In areas with only two genders, only nouns referring to people have a distinction between masculine and feminine; all other nouns that are not neuter are common.

	Neuter	Masculine	Feminine	Plural
Indefinite article	een			-
Definite article	het	de		
Adjective for definite noun	groen(e)	groene		
Adjective for indefinite noun	groen	groene		
Subject pronoun	het	hij	zij	
Object pronoun	het	hem	haar	hen, hun
Possessive	zijn		haar	hun
Inflected possessive zijn as example	zijn			
Proximal demonstrative	dit	deze		
Distal demonstrative	dat	die		
Interrogative	wat	wie		

The standard as prescribed by the Dutch Language Union categorises most nouns into one of four categories:

- neuter, marked o (for onzijdig) in Dutch or n in English;
- masculine, marked m;
- feminine, marked v (for vrouwelijk) in Dutch or f in English; and
- feminine but optionally masculine, marked v/m in Dutch or f/m in English.

Thus, the standard only mandates the feminine gender for a subset of all historically feminine nouns. These are nouns with an overtly recognizable feminine suffix. However, this distinction is maintained only in formal or written standard Dutch, whereas many speakers do not make such a distinction in informal speech; they use only the common gender. Such speakers must therefore remember which endings are feminine, because they cannot rely on their own language intuition. Although some speakers do follow the standard in this respect, others do not and simply use the genders the way they are accustomed to them in their own everyday speech (either masculine/feminine/neuter or common/neuter).

In more formal, poetic or archaic language, a stronger distinction exists between the masculine and feminine genders, especially in the genitive forms as shown in the table below (although the distinctions in the bottom row are still commonly applied in informal speech):

	Masculine	Feminine	Neuter
Indefinite article (genitive form)	enes	ener	enes
Definite article (genitive form)	des	der	des
Distal demonstrative pronoun (genitive form)	diens	dier	diens
Relative pronoun (genitive form)	wiens	wier	wiens

The trend so far is towards the increasing use of the common gender, at the expense of the masculine/feminine distinction. Although this process has long been completed in the spoken language of the north, the three-gender structure is still widespread in the south, though some suggest it is slowly losing ground due to the increase of language contact through mass media like television and the Internet. Some dictionaries have dropped the distinction between the two genders entirely, preferring to mark words with their definite article de (common) or het (neuter), whereas others like the Woordenboek der Nederlandse Taal—the largest Dutch dictionary—retain it. The Van Dale recognises four categories of the definite article de: masculine, feminine, de (vm) for nouns which were originally feminine but have a variable gender, and de (m/v) for nouns denoting people with a common gender. The dictionary Grote Prisma Nederlands either uses the definite article de or indicates gender by mentioning the pronoun hij or zij. Because the feminine gender of nouns tends to be respected in formal or written language, which tends to follow the standard more strictly, this sometimes also results in hypercorrection, caused by the perceived formality of the feminine gender, with feminine pronouns occasionally used for nouns that are historically masculine, and even for nouns that are neuter.

The following list reflects the use of gender that is prescribed for standard Dutch and used by the Language Union and educational material for teaching gender. It is not exhaustive, and covers only cases that follow some recognizable pattern. Many words have unpredictable gender and simply have to be memorized (and will be f/m in the standard, if not neuter).

=== Masculine nouns ===
Words referring to animate entities whose natural gender is masculine:

- oom "uncle"
- hengst "stallion"

However, diminutives such as jongetje "little boy" are neuter nouns. Nouns for professions (which are often historically masculine) may also be treated as gender-neutral, and are then either masculine or feminine depending on the referent.

Words not referring to animate entities ending in the following suffixes, which mostly form agent nouns, are masculine:

- -aar – handelaar "merchant"
- -aard – dronkaard "drunkard"
- -er – bakker "baker"
- -erd – engerd "creep"
- -eur – directeur "manager"
- -or – kolonisator "colonizer"
- -us – politicus "politician"

There are a few exceptions, such as:

- offer "sacrifice", neuter

Abstract deverbal nouns are normally masculine:

- bloei "blossoming", from bloeien "to blossom"
- dank "thanks", from danken "to thank"
- groei "growth", from groeien "to grow"
- schrik "fear", from schrikken "to be frightened"
- slaap "sleep", from slapen "to sleep"

New abstract nouns formed in this way are always masculine, but existing ones may be feminine, particularly if they are older words.

=== Feminine nouns ===
Words referring to beings whose natural gender is feminine:

- tante "aunt"
- merrie "mare"

This includes words ending in a suffix that derives a noun for a female person from either a masculine noun or from another word:

- -a – politica "female politician" and theoretica "female theoretician" - this suffix can only be used on masculine loan words of Latin origin ending on -us, like politicus "male politician" or theoreticus "male theoretician".
- -e – advocate "female lawyer"
- -ege/-egge – dievegge "female thief" - this suffix is no longer productive; it can also be encountered in its contracted form -ei, e.g., klappei and labbei
- -es – zangeres "female singer"
- -in – godin "goddess"
- -ster – verpleegster "nurse"

The Dutch language leaves in many cases some liberty to individual users on how to derive the female form of a noun; for example apothekeres, apothekerin and apotheekster would all be considered correct forms for "female apothecarian". A recent interesting development with respect to professions has been the return to the masculine gender (in this case apotheker) for practitioners of either sex, combined with pronouns based on the natural gender of the practitioner.

However, diminutives such as meisje "girl" are neuter (but see below).

Words for abstract concepts ending with the following suffixes are feminine:

- -de – liefde "love"
- -erij – brouwerij "brewery"
- -heid – waarheid "truth"
- -ij – voogdij "custody"
- -ing – opleiding "education"
- -nis – kennis "knowledge"
- -schap – vriendschap "friendship"
- -st – winst "profit"
- -te – ziekte "illness"

There are a few exceptions, e.g. dienst "service", which is masculine, or vonnis "verdict", which is neuter. There are also many nouns ending in -schap that are neuter, such as gereedschap "tool", landschap "landscape". These usually refer to concrete objects rather than abstract concepts, but the distinction is not always clear. For example, ouderschap "parenthood" is neuter but abstract, whereas gemeenschap "community" is feminine but concrete.

Suffixes that are borrowed from Latin or Greek often retain their feminine gender from those languages. This includes:

- -ade – tirade "tirade"
- -age – tuigage "rigging"
- -ica – logica "logic"
- -ide – asteroïde "asteroid"
- -ie – filosofie "philosophy"
- -iek – muziek "music"
- -ine – discipline "discipline"
- -logie – zoölogie "zoology"
- -ode – periode "period"
- -se – analyse "analysis"
- -sis – crisis "crisis"
- -suur – censuur "censorship"
- -teit – kwaliteit "quality"
- -theek – bibliotheek "library"
- -tis – bronchitis "bronchitis"
- -tuur – natuur "nature"
- -ude – amplitude "amplitude"
- -xis – syntaxis "syntax"

There are, as always, a few exceptions. For example, kanarie "canary" is masculine and ministerie "ministry" is neuter.

=== Neuter nouns ===
Diminutives are always neuter. They end in -je in the standard language, but the suffix -ke is also used in many dialects.

- bloempje ‘floret (small flower)’
- lammetje ‘lambkin (little lamb)’
- meisje ‘girl’ (literally ‘little maiden’), counterintuitive as clearly feminine (identical to German Mädchen ‘girl’, n.)

When a diminutive refers to a person, masculine or feminine pronouns may refer to the person instead of the neuter het. However, the definite article, demonstrative pronouns, and adjective inflection remain neuter. An exception is meisje, whose neuter gender is generally unknown by most people and which uses feminine pronouns even in formal speech. Unlike in German, grammatical agreement of the type *kijk dat meisje, het kamt zijn haar ‘look at that girl, it is combing its hair’ has been abandoned for diminutives of people, so that words such as meisje are now universally treated as a feminine word, although the agreeing neuter article het is retained. The same applies to jongetje ‘little boy’, mannetje ‘little man, manling’, vrouwtje ‘little woman’, etc.

Nouns prefixed with ge- and related prefixes with no suffix are neuter, especially if they are collectives derived from a verb stem:

- gezicht "face"
- geslacht "gender, sex"
- geluid "sound"
- geloop "walking"
- gezeur "whining"
- verschil "difference"
- ontbijt "breakfast"
- bedrijf "company"

Collective nouns prefixed with ge- and suffixed with -te are neuter:

- gebergte "mountain range"
- geraamte "body frame, skeleton"
- gesteente "rock" (an aggregate of stones)

Nouns prefixed with ge- and suffixed with -te are feminine if they are abstract concepts, such as gedachte "thought".

Names of towns, countries and languages are always neuter, even if they are clearly derived from a masculine or feminine noun:

- Brussel "Brussels"
- Nederland "the Netherlands" (land is also neuter)
- Frans "French (language)"
- Roermond (mond is masculine)

The exceptions are formed by countries or regions that contain a masculine or feminine article as part of their name: de Randstad (stad is feminine or masculine), de Soedan, de Congo, etc.

The following suffixes that are borrowed from Latin or Greek are neuter:

- -isme – socialisme "socialism"
- -ma – thema "theme"
- -um – museum "museum"

There is one notable exception, datum ‘date’, which is masculine and has both a regular nativized plural in datums and the original Latin neuter plural in data.

== The Southern Dutch regiolect ==
Southern Dutch consists roughly of all dialects south of the river Meuse. In these dialects, there was a tendency towards accusativism in early modern Dutch (16th and 17th centuries). This was the tendency to use the accusative case in the role of the nominative. When cases fell out of use later, the nominative was the one that survived, but in areas with accusativism these forms historically belonged to the accusative case. Unlike the old nominative, the accusative had a clear distinction between masculine and feminine forms. As it was these forms that survived in southern Dutch, the genders remained naturally distinct, and remain so up to the present day.

In addition, Southern Dutch developed a separate indefinite article for neuter words—"e" or "ee(n)"—which is pronounced as a schwa (IPA: ə). Similar to English "an" versus "a", this article is not used when the following word starts with a vowel or a h-; rather "een" ('n) is used in those cases.

The following table shows the points where the southern dialects differ from the standard language. As the dialects themselves are not standardised, different forms may be found in different areas, although differences have lessened in the Tussentaal, the Dutch regiolect in the Region of Flanders.

	Masculine	Feminine	Neuter	Plural
Indefinite article	ne(n)	een	e, een	-
Definite article	de(n)	de	het	de
Inflected possessive zijn as example	zijne(n)	zijn	zijn	zijn
Proximal demonstrative	deze(n)	deze	dit	deze
Distal demonstrative	diene(n)	die	dat	die

Example 1: (vrouw is feminine)

- Southern: Heeft u mijn vrouw gezien?
- Standard: Heeft u mijn vrouw gezien?
- English: Have you seen my wife?

Example 2: (auto and boom are masculine)

- Southern: Ik heb mijnen auto onder dienen boom geparkeerd.
- Standard: Ik heb mijn auto onder die boom geparkeerd.
- English: I parked my car beneath that tree.

Example 3: (appartement and dorp are neuter)

- Southern Ik woon in een appartement in e klein dorp.
- Standard: Ik woon in een appartement in een klein dorp.
- English: I live in an apartment in a small village.

== Gender-neutral language ==
Similarly to English (with the use of "they" as the singular gender-neutral pronoun) or Swedish (which developed the new gender-neutral pronoun "hen"), there have been different proposals in Dutch to broaden the use of gender-neutral pronouns. Most notably, the pronoun hen or die (direct object form: hen or die, indirect object form: hun or die, possessive form: hun or diens) started gaining traction around 2016. These pronouns are mentioned on the website of the leading Dutch dictionary publisher Van Dale and have been mentioned on websites of the Dutch Language Union since 2022.

More traditionally, Dutch has employed a variety of means to accommodate cases where the gender of a person is not known. Standard solutions include the use of degene ("the one"; unstressed) and diegene ("that one"; stressed).

== Comparison with German ==
As Dutch is closely related to German, Dutch nouns tend to have the same gender as their close cognates in German. The exceptions are so few that they can be noted specially, which can be helpful for language learners.

=== Masculine in Dutch vs. neuter in German ===
- de auto (m) : das Auto (car, automobile)
- de baby (m) : das Baby (baby)
- de datum (m) : das Datum (date)
- de radio (m) : das Radio (radio)
- de telefoon (m) : das Telefon (telephone)

=== Feminine/masculine in Dutch vs. neuter in German ===
- de boot (f/m) : das Boot (boat)
- de knie (f/m) : das Knie (knee)
- de (eerste) maal (f/m) : das (erste) Mal (time, occurrence)

=== Feminine in Dutch vs. neuter in German ===
- a number of words in -nis:
  - de beeltenis (f) : das Bildnis
  - de begrafenis (f) : das Begräbnis
  - de bekentenis (f) : das Bekenntnis
  - de belevenis (f) : das Erlebnis
  - de ergernis (f) : das Ärgernis
  - de gelijkenis (f) : das Gleichnis
  - de gevangenis (f) : das Gefängnis
  - de hindernis (f) : das Hindernis

=== Feminine in Dutch vs. masculine in German ===
- de asteroïde (f) : der Asteroid (asteroid)
- de winst (f) : der Gewinn/Gewinst (profit)

=== Feminine/masculine in Dutch vs. masculine in German ===
- de maan (f/m) : der Mond (moon)
- de planeet (f/m) : der Planet (planet)
- de ster (f/m) : der Stern (star)

=== Neuter in Dutch vs. masculine in German ===
- het artikel : der Artikel (article)
- het bedrijf : der Betrieb (company, business)
- het bericht : der Bericht (report)
- het dialect : der Dialekt (dialect)
- het nadeel : der Nachteil (disadvantage)
- het verkeer : der Verkehr (traffic)
- het voordeel : der Vorteil (advantage)

All German words in -ismus are masculine, but their Dutch cognates are all neuter, cf. German der Sozialismus vs. Dutch het socialisme.

=== Neuter in Dutch vs. feminine in German ===
- het antwoord : die Antwort (answer)
- het idee : die Idee (idea)
- het nummer : die Nummer (number)
- a number of abstract nouns in -schap, e.g.:
  - het genootschap : die Genossenschaft (society, association)
  - het gezelschap : die Gesellschaft (company)
  - het graafschap : die Grafschaft (county)
  - het knechtschap : die Knechtschaft (servitude)
  - het landschap : die Landschaft (landscape)
  - het moederschap : die Mutterschaft (motherhood)
  - het nabuurschap : die Nachbarschaft (neighbourhood)
  - het ouderschap : die Elternschaft (parenthood)
  - het partnerschap : die Partnerschaft (partnership)
  - het presidentschap : die Präsidentschaft (presidency)
  - het vaderschap : die Vaterschaft (paternity)
  - het waardschap : die Wirtschaft (innkeeping / inn)

In German, all nouns with the suffix -schaft are feminine.

== See also ==
- Dutch grammar
- Grammatical gender
