= Grammatical gender =

Linguistic system of noun classification

In linguistics, a grammatical gender system is a specific form of a noun class system, where nouns are assigned to gender categories that are often not related to the real-world qualities of the entities denoted by those nouns. English does not have this system, though most other Indo-European languages have it. In languages with grammatical gender, most or all nouns inherently carry one value of the grammatical category called gender. (Note: Some authors use the term "grammatical gender" as a synonym of "noun class", whereas others use different definitions for each. Many authors prefer "noun classes" when none of the inflections in a language relate to sex or gender. According to one definition, "Genders are classes of nouns reflected in the behavior of associated words.") The values present in a given language, of which there are usually two or three, are called the genders of that language. Determiners, adjectives, and pronouns also change their form depending on the noun to which they refer.

== Overview ==
Languages with grammatical gender usually have two to four different genders, but some are attested with up to 20.

Common gender divisions include masculine and feminine; masculine, feminine, and neuter; or animate and inanimate.

Spanish nouns, pronouns, adjectives, and determiners have two genders: masculine and feminine, represented here by the nouns gato and gata.

Depending on the language and the specific word, the assignment of grammatical gender may correlate with the noun's meaning (e.g., "woman" is typically feminine) or may be entirely arbitrary.

In a few languages, the assignment of any particular noun (i.e., nominal lexeme, that set of noun forms inflectable from a common lemma) to one grammatical gender is solely determined by that noun's meaning, or attributes, like gender identity, humanness, or animacy. However, the existence of words that denote male and female, such as the difference between "aunt" and "uncle", is not enough to constitute a gender system.

In other languages, the division into genders usually correlates to some degree, at least for a certain set of nouns, such as those denoting humans, with some property or properties of the things that particular nouns denote. Such properties include animacy or inanimacy, "humanness" or non-humanness, and gender identity.

However, in most languages, this semantic division is only partially valid, and many nouns may belong to a gender category that contrasts with their meaning, e.g. the word for "manliness" could be of feminine gender, as it is in French with "la masculinité" and "la virilité". (Note: The word for "manliness" has feminine grammatical gender in Spanish (hombría, virilidad, masculinidad), French (masculinité, virilité), Latin (virtūs), German (Männlichkeit, Virilität), Polish (męskość), Russian (мужественность, muzhestvennost') and Hindi (मर्दानगी, mardânegi), among others.) In such a case, the gender assignment can also be influenced by the morphology or phonology of the noun, or in some cases can be apparently arbitrary.

Usually each noun is assigned one of the genders, and few or no nouns can occur in more than one gender.

Gender is considered an inherent quality of nouns, and it affects the forms of other related words, a process called "agreement". Nouns may be considered the "triggers" of the process, whereas other words will be the "target" of these changes.

These related words can be, depending on the language: determiners, pronouns, numerals, quantifiers, possessives, adjectives, past and passive participles, articles, verbs, adverbs, complementizers, and adpositions. Gender class may be marked on the noun itself, but will also always be marked on other constituents in a noun phrase or sentence. If the noun is explicitly marked, both trigger and target may feature similar alternations.

=== Functions ===
Three possible functions of grammatical gender include:

1. In a language with explicit inflections for gender, it is easy to express gender distinctions in animate beings.
2. Grammatical gender "can be a valuable tool of disambiguation", rendering clarity about antecedents or homophones.
3. In literature, gender can be used to "animate and personify inanimate nouns".

Languages with gender distinction generally have fewer cases of ambiguity concerning, for example, pronominal reference. In the English phrase "a flowerbed in the garden which I maintain", only context tells us whether the relative clause (which I maintain) refers to the whole garden or just the flowerbed. In German, in cases where the objects in question have different grammatical gender, gender distinction prevents such ambiguity. The word for "flowerbed" (Blumenbeet) is neuter, whereas that for "garden" (Garten) is masculine. Hence, if a neuter relative pronoun is used, the relative clause refers to "flowerbed", and if a masculine pronoun is used, the relative clause refers to "garden". Because of this, languages with gender distinction can often use pronouns where in English a noun would have to be repeated in order to avoid confusion. It does not, however, help in cases where the words are of the same grammatical gender.

Moreover, grammatical gender may serve to distinguish homophones. It is a quite common phenomenon in language development for two phonemes to merge, thereby making etymologically distinct words sound alike. In languages with gender distinction, however, these word pairs may still be distinguishable by their gender. For example, French pot ("pot") and peau ("skin") are homophones /po/, but disagree in gender: le pot vs. la peau.

=== Gender contrasts ===
Common systems of gender contrast include:

- masculine–feminine gender contrast
- masculine–feminine–neuter gender contrast
- animate–inanimate gender contrast
- common–neuter gender contrast

==== Masculine–feminine contrast ====
Nouns that denote specifically male persons (or animals) are normally of masculine gender; those that denote specifically female persons (or animals) are normally of feminine gender; and nouns that denote something that does not have any gender, or do not specify the gender of their referent, have come to belong to one or other of the genders, in a way that may appear arbitrary. Examples of languages with such a system include most of the modern Romance languages, the Baltic languages, the Celtic languages, some Indo-Aryan languages (e.g., Hindustani), and the Afroasiatic languages.

==== Masculine–feminine–neuter contrast ====
This is similar to systems with a masculine–feminine contrast, except that there is a third available gender, so nouns with gender-less or unspecified-gender referents may be either masculine, feminine, or neuter. There are also certain exceptional nouns whose gender does not follow the denoted gender, such as the German Mädchen, meaning "girl", which is neuter. This is because it is actually a diminutive of Magd and all diminutive forms with the suffix -chen are neuter. Examples of languages with such a system include later forms of Proto-Indo-European, Sanskrit, some Germanic languages, most Slavic languages, a few Romance languages (Romanian, Asturian and Neapolitan), Marathi, Latin, and Greek (Modern and Ancient).

==== Animate–inanimate contrast ====
Here nouns that denote animate things (humans and animals) generally belong to one gender, and those that denote inanimate things to another (although there may be some deviation from that principle). Examples include earlier forms of Proto-Indo-European and the earliest family known to have split off from it, the extinct Anatolian languages. Modern examples include Algonquian languages such as Ojibwe.

==== Common–neuter contrast ====
Here a masculine–feminine–neuter system previously existed, but the distinction between masculine and feminine genders has been lost in nouns (they have merged into what is called common gender), though not in pronouns that can operate under natural gender. Thus nouns denoting people are usually of common gender, whereas other nouns may be of either gender. Examples include Danish and Swedish, and to some extent Dutch.

The dialect of the old Norwegian capital Bergen also uses common gender and neuter exclusively. The common gender in Bergen and in Danish is inflected with the same articles and suffixes as the masculine gender in Norwegian Bokmål. This makes some obviously feminine noun phrases like "a cute girl", "the well milking cow" or "the pregnant mares" sound strange to most Norwegian ears when spoken by Danes and people from Bergen since they are inflected in a way that sounds like the masculine declensions in South-Eastern Norwegian dialects.

The same does not apply to Swedish common gender, as the declensions follow a different pattern from both the Norwegian written languages. Norwegian Nynorsk, Norwegian Bokmål and most spoken dialects retain masculine, feminine and neuter even if their Scandinavian neighbors have lost one of the genders. As shown, the merger of masculine and feminine in these languages and dialects can be considered a reversal of the original split in Proto-Indo-European.

==== Other types of division or subdivision of gender ====
Some gender contrasts are referred to as classes. In some of the Slavic languages, for example, within the masculine and sometimes feminine and neuter genders, there is a further division between animate and inanimate nouns—and in Polish, also sometimes between nouns denoting humans and non-humans. A human–non-human (or "rational–non-rational") distinction is also found in Dravidian languages.

=== How gender contrasts can influence cognition ===
It has been shown that grammatical gender causes a number of cognitive effects. For example, when native speakers of gendered languages are asked to imagine an inanimate object speaking, whether its voice is male or female tends to correspond to the grammatical gender of the object in their language. This has been observed for speakers of Spanish, French, and German, among others.

Caveats of this research include the possibility of subjects "using grammatical gender as a strategy for performing the task", and the fact that even for inanimate objects the gender of nouns is not always random. For example, in Spanish, female gender is often attributed to objects that are "used by women, natural, round, or light", but male gender to objects "used by men, artificial, angular, or heavy". Apparent failures to reproduce the effect for German speakers has also led to a proposal that the effect is restricted to languages with a two-gender system, possibly because such languages are inclined towards a greater correspondence between grammatical and natural gender.

Another kind of test, the semantic differential, asks people to describe a noun, and attempts to measure whether it takes on gender-specific connotations depending on the speaker's native language. For example, one study found that German speakers describing a bridge (German: Brücke, f.) more often used the words 'beautiful', 'elegant', 'pretty', and 'slender', while Spanish speakers, whose word for 'bridge' is masculine (puente, m.), used 'big', 'dangerous', 'strong', and 'sturdy' more often. However, studies of this kind have been criticized on various grounds and yield an unclear pattern of results overall.

=== Related linguistic concepts ===
==== Noun classes ====
A noun may belong to a given class because of characteristic features of its referent, such as gender, animacy, shape, although in some instances a noun can be placed in a particular class based purely on its grammatical behavior. Some authors use the term grammatical gender as a synonym of noun class, but others use different definitions for each.

Many authors prefer the term noun class when none of the inflections in a language relate to gender, such as when an animate–inanimate distinction is made. However, the word gender derives from Latin genus (also the root of genre) which originally meant 'kind, type', so it does not necessarily have a meaning that relates to gender.

==== Noun classifiers ====
A classifier, or measure word, is a word or morpheme used in some languages together with a noun, principally to enable numbers and certain other determiners to be applied to the noun. They are not regularly used in English or other European languages, although they parallel the use of words such as piece(s) and head in phrases like "three pieces of paper" or "thirty head of cattle". They are a prominent feature of East Asian languages, where it is common for all nouns to require a classifier when being quantified—for example, the equivalent of "three people" is often "three classifier people". A more general type of classifier (classifier handshapes) can be found in sign languages.

Classifiers can be considered similar to genders or noun classes, in that a language which uses classifiers normally has a number of different ones, used with different sets of nouns. These sets depend largely on properties of the things that the nouns denote (for example, a particular classifier may be used for long thin objects, another for flat objects, another for people, another for abstracts, etc.), although sometimes a noun is associated with a particular classifier more by convention than for any obvious reason. However it is also possible for a given noun to be usable with any of several classifiers; for example, the Mandarin Chinese classifier 个 (個) gè is frequently used as an alternative to various more specific classifiers.

== Manifestation ==
Grammatical gender can be realized as inflection and can be conditioned by other types of inflection, especially number inflection, where the singular-plural contrast can interact with gender inflection.

=== As inflection ===
The grammatical gender of a noun manifests itself in two principal ways: in the modifications that the noun itself undergoes, and in modifications of other related words (agreement).

==== As noun inflection ====
Grammatical gender manifests itself when words related to a noun like determiners, pronouns or adjectives change their form (inflect) according to the gender of noun they refer to (agreement). The parts of speech affected by gender agreement, the circumstances in which it occurs, and the way words are marked for gender vary between languages. Gender inflection may interact with other grammatical categories like number or case. In some languages the declension pattern followed by the noun itself will be different for different genders.

The gender of a noun may affect the modifications that the noun itself undergoes, particularly the way in which the noun inflects for number and case. For example, a language like Latin, German or Russian has a number of different declension patterns, and which pattern a particular noun follows may be highly correlated with its gender. A concrete example is provided by the German word See, which has two possible genders: when it is masculine (meaning "lake") its genitive singular form is Sees, but when it is feminine (meaning "sea"), the genitive is See, because feminine nouns do not take the genitive -s.

Gender is sometimes reflected in other ways. In Welsh, gender marking is mostly lost on nouns; however, Welsh has initial mutation, where the first consonant of a word changes into another in certain conditions. Gender is one of the factors that can cause one form of mutation (soft mutation). For instance, the word merch "girl" changes into ferch after the definite article. This only occurs with feminine singular nouns: mab "son" remains unchanged. Adjectives are affected by gender in a similar way.

Soft initial mutation caused by gender in Welsh
| | Default | | After definite article | | With adjective | |
|---|---|---|---|---|---|---|
| Masculine singular | mab | "son" | y mab | "the son" | y mab mawr | "the big son" |
| Feminine singular | merch | "girl" | y ferch | "the girl" | y ferch fawr | "the big girl" |

Additionally, in many languages, gender is often closely correlated with the basic unmodified form (lemma) of the noun, and sometimes a noun can be modified to produce (for example) masculine and feminine words of similar meaning.

==== As agreement or concord ====
Agreement, or concord, is a grammatical process in which certain words change their form so that values of certain grammatical categories match those of related words. Gender is one of the categories which frequently require agreement. In this case, nouns may be considered the "triggers" of the process, because they have an inherent gender, whereas related words that change their form to match the gender of the noun can be considered the "target" of these changes.

These related words can be, depending on the language: determiners, pronouns, numerals, quantifiers, possessives, adjectives, past and passive participles, verbs, adverbs, complementizers, and adpositions. Gender class may be marked on the noun itself, but can also be marked on other constituents in a noun phrase or sentence. If the noun is explicitly marked, both trigger and target may feature similar alternations.

==== Natural gender ====
Natural gender refers to the gender of most animals and people, while grammatical gender refers to certain phonetic characteristics (the sounds at the end, or beginning) of a noun. Among other lexical items, the definite article changes its form according to this categorization.

As an example, we consider Spanish, a language with two gender categories: "natural" vs "grammatical". "Natural" gender can be masculine or feminine, while "grammatical" gender can be masculine, feminine, or neuter. This third, or "neuter" gender is reserved for abstract concepts derived from adjectives: such as lo bueno, lo malo ("that which is good/bad"). In the singular, the article is: el (masculine), and la (feminine). (Note: Exception: Feminine nouns beginning with stressed a-, like águila "eagle", also take the article el despite their feminine gender (el águila "the eagle"). This does not happen if the noun is preceded by an adjective (la bella águila "the beautiful eagle"), or in the plural (las aguilas "the eagles").) Thus, in "natural gender", nouns referring to beings who are male beings carry the masculine article, and female beings the feminine article (agreement).

Example of natural gender in Spanish
| "Natural" gender | Phrase |
|---|---|
| Masculine | el abuelo the.MASC.SG grandfather "the grandfather" |
| Feminine | la abuela the.FEM.SG grandmother "the grandmother" |

Example of grammatical gender in Spanish
| "Grammatical" gender | Number | Phrase |
|---|---|---|
| Masculine | Singular | el plato the.MASC.SG dish "the dish" |
| Masculine | Plural | los platos the.MASC.PL dishes "the dishes" |
| Feminine | Singular | la guitarra the.FEM.SG guitar "the guitar" |
| Feminine | Plural | las guitarras the.FEM.PL guitar "the guitars" |

==== Gender inflection and number inflection ====
In some languages the gender is distinguished only in singular number but not in plural. In terms of linguistic markedness, these languages neutralize the gender opposition in the plural, itself a marked category. So adjectives and pronouns have three forms in singular (e.g. Bulgarian червен, червена, червено or German roter, rote, rotes) but only one in plural (Bulgarian червени, German rote) [all examples mean "red"]. As a consequence pluralia tantum nouns (lacking a singular form) cannot be assigned a gender. Example with Bulgarian: клещи (kleshti, "pincers"), гащи (gashti, "pants"), очила (ochila, "spectacles"), хриле (hrile, "gills"). (Note: The characteristic ending -а of очила suggests a neuter noun, but there is no way to cross-check it and there are indeed a few masculine nouns using the same ending in their plural (крака and рога are plurals of masculine крак "leg" and рог "horn"). However, the endings -и and -е do not make any such indications because they are ambiguous themselves: although -и is the regular ending for masculine and feminine nouns, both are in fact used to form plurals of nouns of all three genders (e.g. заводи, жени, насекоми from masculine завод "factory", feminine жена "woman" and neuter насекомо "insect" or крале, ръце, колене from masculine крал "king", feminine ръка "hand" and neuter коляно "knee").)

Other languages, e.g. Serbo-Croatian, allow doubly marked forms both for number and gender. In these languages, each noun has a definite gender no matter the number. For example, d(j)eca "children" is feminine singularia tantum and vrata "door" is neuter pluralia tantum.

=== On pronouns ===
Pronouns may agree in gender with the noun or noun phrase to which they refer (their antecedent). Sometimes, however, there is no antecedent—the referent of the pronoun is deduced indirectly from the context: this is found with personal pronouns, as well as with indefinite and dummy pronouns.

==== Personal pronouns ====
With personal pronouns, the gender of the pronoun is likely to agree with the natural gender of the referent. Indeed, in most European languages, personal pronouns are gendered; for example English (the personal pronouns he, she and it are used depending on whether the referent is male, female, or inanimate or non-human; this is in spite of the fact that English does not generally have grammatical gender). A parallel example is provided by the object suffixes of verbs in Arabic, which correspond to object pronouns, and which also inflect for gender in the second person (though not in the first):

- "I love you", said to a male: uḥibbuka (أُحِبُّكَ)
- "I love you", said to a female: uḥibbuki (أُحِبُّكِ)

Not all languages have gendered pronouns. In languages that never had grammatical gender, there is normally just one word for "he" and "she", like dia in Malay and Indonesian, ő in Hungarian and o in Turkish. These languages might only have different pronouns and inflections in the third person to differentiate between people and inanimate objects, but even this distinction is often absent. In written Finnish, for example, hän is used for "he" and "she" and se for "it", but in the colloquial language se is usually used for "he" and "she" as well.

Issues may arise in languages with gender-specific pronouns in cases when the gender of the referent is unknown or not specified; this is a matter that arises frequently in relation to gender-neutral language, as with English usage of singular they.

In some cases, the gender of a pronoun is not marked in the form of the pronoun itself, but is marked on other words by way of agreement. Thus the French word for 'I' is je, regardless of who is speaking; but this word becomes feminine or masculine depending on the gender of the speaker, as may be reflected through adjective agreement: je suis forte ('I am strong', spoken/written by a female); je suis fort (the same but by a male).

In null-subject languages (and in some elliptical expressions in other languages), such agreement may take place even though the pronoun does not in fact appear. For example, in Portuguese:

- '[I am] very grateful', said/written by a male: muito obrigado
- the same, by a female: muito obrigada

The two sentences above mean literally 'much obliged'; the adjective agrees with the natural gender of the speaker, that is, with the gender of the first person pronoun which does not appear explicitly here.

==== Indefinite and dummy pronouns ====
A dummy pronoun is a type of pronoun used when a particular verb argument (such as the subject) is nonexistent, but when a reference to the argument is nevertheless syntactically required. They occur mostly in non-pro-drop languages, such as English (because in pro-drop languages the position of the argument can be left empty). Examples in English are the uses of it in "It's raining" and "It's nice to relax."

When a language has gendered pronouns, the use of a particular word as a dummy pronoun may involve the selection of a particular gender, even though there is no noun to agree with. In languages with a neuter gender, a neuter pronoun is usually used, as in German es regnet ("it rains, it's raining"), where es is the neuter third person singular pronoun. (English behaves similarly, because the word it comes from the Old English neuter gender.) In languages with only masculine and feminine genders, the dummy pronoun may be the masculine third person singular, as in the French for "it's raining": il pleut (where il means "he", or "it" when referring to masculine nouns); although some languages use the feminine, as in the equivalent Welsh sentence: mae hi'n bwrw glaw (where the dummy pronoun is hi, which means "she", or "it" when referring to feminine nouns).

A similar, apparently arbitrary gender assignment may need to be made in the case of indefinite pronouns, where the referent is generally unknown. In this case the question is usually not which pronoun to use, but which gender to assign a given pronoun to (for such purposes as adjective agreement). For example, the French pronouns quelqu'un ("someone"), personne ("no-one") and quelque chose ("something") are all treated as masculine—this is in spite of the fact that the last two correspond to feminine nouns (personne meaning "person", and chose meaning "thing").

=== Grammatical vs. natural gender ===
The natural gender of a noun, pronoun or noun phrase is a gender to which it would be expected to belong based on relevant attributes of its referent. Although grammatical gender can coincide with natural gender, it does not need to.

==== Grammatical gender can match natural gender ====
This usually means masculine or feminine, depending on the referent's gender. For example, in Spanish, mujer ("woman") is feminine whereas hombre ("man") is masculine; these attributions occur solely due to the semantically inherent gender character of each noun.

==== Grammatical gender need not match natural gender ====
The grammatical gender of a noun does not always coincide with its natural gender. An example of this is the German word Mädchen ("girl"); this is derived from Magd ("maiden"), umlauted to Mäd- with the diminutive suffix -chen, and this suffix always makes the noun grammatically neuter. Hence the grammatical gender of Mädchen is neuter, although its natural gender is feminine (because it refers to a female person).

Other examples include:

- Old English wīf (neuter) and wīfmann (masculine), meaning "woman"
- German Weib (neuter), meaning "woman" (the word is now pejorative and generally replaced with die Frau, originally 'lady', feminine of obsolete der Fro, meaning 'lord')
- Irish cailín (masculine) meaning "girl", and stail (feminine) meaning "stallion"
- Portuguese mulherão (masculine), meaning "voluptuous woman"
- Scottish Gaelic boireannach (masculine), meaning "woman"
- Slovenian dekle (neuter), meaning "girl"
- Polish babsztyl (masculine), meaning "unpleasant (usually old and ugly) woman"
- Czech děvče (neuter), meaning "a young girl"

Normally, such exceptions are a small minority.

When a noun with conflicting natural and grammatical gender is the antecedent of a pronoun, it may not be clear which gender of pronoun to choose. There is a certain tendency to keep the grammatical gender when a close back-reference is made, but to switch to natural gender when the reference is further away. For example, in German, the sentences "The girl has come home from school. She is now doing her homework" can be translated in two ways:

- Das Mädchen (n.) ist aus der Schule gekommen. Es (n.) macht jetzt seine (n.) Hausaufgaben.
- Das Mädchen (n.) ist aus der Schule gekommen. Sie (f.) macht jetzt ihre (f.) Hausaufgaben.

Though the second sentence may appear grammatically incorrect (constructio ad sensum), it is common in speech. With one or more intervening sentences, the second form becomes even more likely. However, a switch to the natural gender is never possible with articles and attributive pronouns or adjectives. Thus it can never be correct to say *eine Mädchen ("a girl" – with female indefinite article) or *diese kleine Mädchen ("this little girl" – with female demonstrative pronoun and adjective).

This phenomenon is quite popular in Slavic languages: for example Polish kreatura (deprecative "creature") is feminine but can be used to refer to both man (masculine gender), woman (feminine gender), child (neuter gender) or even animate nouns (e.g. a dog being masculine). Similarly with other deprecatory nouns as pierdoła, ciapa, łamaga, łajza, niezdara ("wuss, klutz"); niemowa ("mute") can be used deprecatively as described previously, and then can be used for verbs marked for the male and female genders.

==== Gender contrasts on human versus sentient referents ====
In the case of languages which have masculine and feminine genders, the relation between gender identity and grammatical gender tends to be less exact in the case of animals than in the case of people. In Spanish, for instance, a cheetah is always un guepardo (masculine) and a zebra is always una cebra (feminine), regardless of their gender. In Russian a rat and a butterfly are always krysa (крыса) and babochka (бабочка) (feminine). In French, a giraffe is always une girafe, whereas an elephant is always un éléphant. To specify the gender of an animal, an adjective may be added, as in un guepardo hembra ("a female cheetah"), or una cebra macho ("a male zebra"). Different names for the male and the female of a species are more frequent for common pets or farm animals, e.g. English cow and bull, Spanish vaca "cow" and toro "bull", Russian баран (baran) "ram" and овца (ovtsa) "ewe".

As regards the pronouns used to refer to animals, these generally agree in gender with the nouns denoting those animals, rather than the animals' gender (natural gender). In a language like English, which does not assign grammatical gender to nouns, the pronoun used for referring to objects (it) is often used for animals also. However, if the gender of the animal is known, and particularly in the case of companion animals, the gendered pronouns (he and she) may be used as they would be for a human.

In Polish, a few general words such as zwierzę ("animal") or bydlę ("animal, one head of cattle") are neuter, but most species names are masculine or feminine. When the gender of an animal is known, it will normally be referred to using gendered pronouns consistent with its gender; otherwise the pronouns will correspond to the gender of the noun denoting its species.

=== Syntactic structure ===
There are multiple theoretical approaches to the position and structure of gender in syntactic structures.

== Categorization of nouns into genders ==
In the French language, countries can have masculine (green) or feminine (purple) names. Except for certain islands and Mexique, Mozambique, Cambodge and Zimbabwe, the gender depends on whether the country name ends in -e.

In the Polish language, countries can have masculine (blue), feminine (red) or neuter (yellow) names. Countries with plural non-masculine names are green. There are no country names in Polish with plural masculine personal gender.

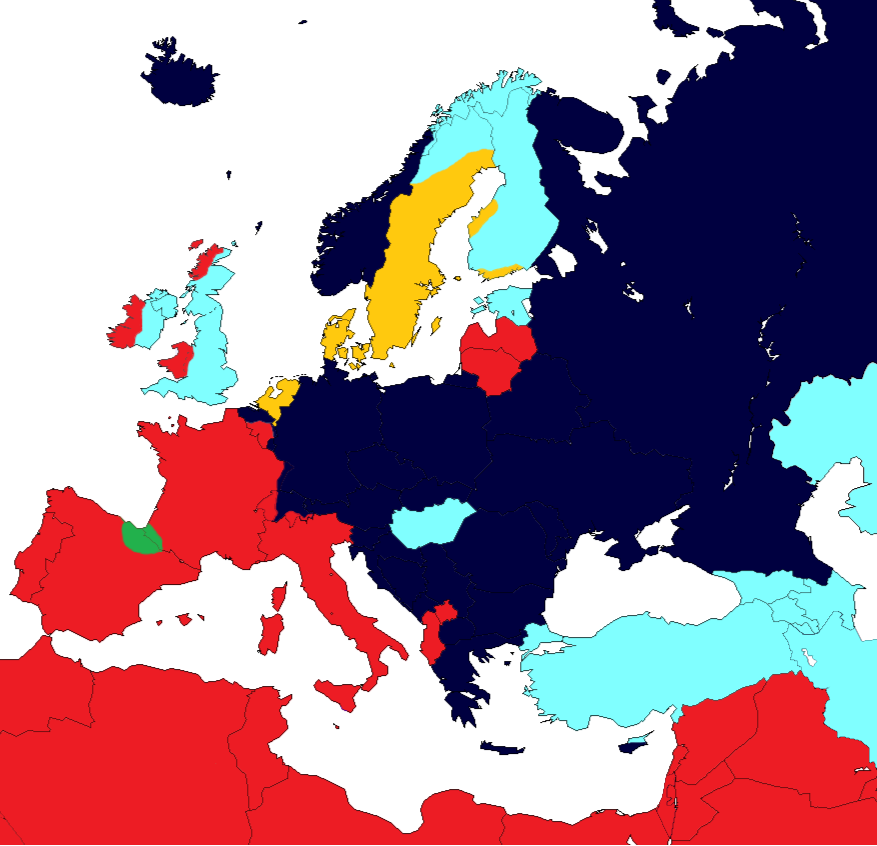
Gender in European languages: Light blue: no gender system. Yellow: common/neuter. Red: masculine/feminine. Green: animate/inanimate. Dark blue: masculine/feminine/neuter. Standard Dutch has a three-gender structure, which fell in disuse in the North of the Netherlands but remains very much alive in Flanders and the South of the Netherlands.

There are three main ways by which natural languages categorize nouns into genders:

- according to their form (morphological)
- according to logical or symbolic similarities in their meaning (semantic)
- according to arbitrary convention (lexical, possibly rooted in the language's history).

In most languages that have grammatical gender, a combination of these three types of criteria is found, although one type may be more prevalent.

=== Form-based morphological criteria ===
In many languages, nouns are assigned to gender largely without any semantic basis—that is, not based on any feature (such as animacy or gender) of the person or thing that a noun represents. In such languages there may be a correlation, to a greater or lesser degree, between gender and the form of a noun (such as the vowel or consonant or syllable with which it ends).

For example, in Portuguese and Spanish, nouns that end in -o are mostly masculine, whereas those that end in -a are mostly feminine, regardless of their meaning. Nouns that end in some other vowel or a consonant are assigned a gender either according to etymology, by analogy, or by some other convention. These rules may override semantics in some cases: for example, the noun membro/miembro ("member") is always masculine, even when it refers to a girl or a woman, and pessoa/persona ("person") is always feminine, even when it refers to a boy or a man, a kind of form-meaning mismatch.

In other cases, meaning takes precedence: the noun comunista "communist" is masculine when it refers or could refer to a man, even though it ends with -a. Nouns in Spanish and Portuguese, as in the other Romance languages such as Italian and French, generally follow the gender of the Latin words from which they are derived. When nouns deviate from the rules for gender, there is usually an etymological explanation: problema ("problem") is masculine in Spanish because it was derived from a Greek noun of the neuter gender, whereas foto ("photo") and radio ("broadcast signal") are feminine because they are clippings of fotografía and radiodifusión respectively, both grammatically feminine nouns.

Most Spanish nouns in -ión are feminine. They derive from Latin feminines in -ō, accusative -iōnem. The opposite is correct with Northern Kurdish language or Kurmanci. For example, the words endam (member) and heval (friend) can be masculine or feminine according to the person they refer to.

- Keça wî hevala min e. (His daughter is my friend)
- Kurrê wî hevalê min e. (His son is my friend)

Suffixes often carry a specific gender. For example, in German, diminutives with the suffixes -chen and -lein, meaning 'little, young', are always neuter, even if they refer to people, as with Mädchen 'girl' and Fräulein 'young woman'. When the suffix -ling is used to convert uncountable nouns to countable nouns (Teig 'dough' → Teigling 'piece of dough'), abstract nouns to personal nouns (Strafe 'punishment' → Sträfling 'convict'), or adjectives into nouns (feige 'cowardly' → Feigling 'coward'), the result is always masculine. Similarly, the suffixes -heit and -keit (comparable with -hood and -ness in English) produce feminine nouns.

In Irish, most nouns ending with a broad consonant are masculine, those ending with a slender consonant are feminine (see Irish phonology), with significant exceptions: nouns ending in -óir/-eoir and -ín are always masculine, whereas those ending -óg/-eog or -lann are always feminine.

In Arabic, nouns whose singular form ends in a tāʾ marbūṭah (traditionally a [t], becoming [h] in pausa) are of feminine gender, the only significant exceptions being the word خليفة khalīfah ("caliph") and certain masculine personal names (e.g. أسامة ʾUsāmah). However, many masculine nouns have a "broken" plural form ending in a tāʾ marbūṭa; for example أستاذ ustādh ("male professor") has the plural أساتذة asātidha, which might be confused for a feminine singular noun. Gender may also be predictable from the type of derivation: for instance, the verbal nouns of Stem II (e.g. التفعيل al-tafʿīl, from فعّل، يفعّل faʿʿala, yufaʿʿil) are always masculine.

In French, nouns ending in -e tend to be feminine, whereas others tend to be masculine, but there are many exceptions to this (e.g. cadre, arbre, signe, meuble, nuage are masculine as façon, chanson, voix, main, eau are feminine), note the many masculine nouns ending in -e preceded by double consonants. Certain suffixes are quite reliable indicators, such as -age, which when added to a verb (e.g. garer "to park" → garage; nettoyer "to clean" → nettoyage "cleaning") indicates a masculine noun; however, when -age is part of the root of the word, it can be feminine, as in plage ("beach") or image. On the other hand, nouns ending in -tion, -sion and -aison are almost all feminine, with a few exceptions, such as cation, bastion.

Nouns can sometimes vary their form to enable the derivation of differently gendered cognate nouns; for example, to produce nouns with a similar meaning that refer to someone of a different gender. Thus, in Spanish, niño means "boy", and niña means "girl". This paradigm can be exploited for making new words: from the masculine nouns abogado "lawyer", diputado "member of parliament" and doctor "doctor", it was straightforward to make the feminine equivalents abogada, diputada, and doctora.

In the same way, personal names are frequently constructed with affixes that identify the gender of the bearer. Common feminine suffixes used in English names are -a, of Latin or Romance origin (cf. Robert and Roberta); and -e, of French origin (cf. Justin and Justine).

Although gender inflection may be used to construct nouns and names for people of different genders in languages that have grammatical gender, this alone does not constitute grammatical gender. Distinct words and names for men and women are also common in languages which do not have a grammatical gender system for nouns in general. English, for example, has feminine suffixes such as -ess (as in waitress), and also distinguishes male and female personal names, as in the above examples.

==== Differentiation of personal names ====
Statistical data on the Spanish nouns and names ending in a

Given names are proper nouns and they follow the same gender grammatical rules as common nouns. In most Indo-European languages female grammatical gender is created using an "a" or an "e" ending.

Classical Latin typically made a grammatical feminine gender with -a (silva "forest", aqua "water") and this was reflected in feminine names originating in that period, like Emilia. Romance languages preserved this characteristic. For example, in Spanish, approximately 89% of nouns that end in -a or -á are classified as feminine; the same is true for 98% of given names with the -a ending.

In the Germanic languages the female names have been Latinized by adding -e and -a: Brunhild, Kriemhild and Hroswith became Brunhilde, Kriemhilde and Hroswitha. Slavic feminine given names: Olga (Russian), Małgorzata (Polish), Tetiana (Ukrainian), Oksana (Belarusian), Eliška (Czech), Bronislava (Slovak), Milica (Serbian), Darina (Bulgarian), Lucja (Croatian), Lamija (Bosnian) and Zala (Slovenian).

==== Differentiation of nouns with human referents ====
In some languages, nouns with human references have two forms, a male and a female one. This includes not only proper names, but also names for occupations and nationalities. Examples include:

- English proper names:
  1. male: Andrew
  2. female: Andrea
  3. common: Chris for both male and female
- English occupation names
  1. male: waiter
  2. female: waitress
  3. common: doctor for both male and female
- Greek proper names Κωνσταντίνος (Konstantinos) and Κωνσταντίνα (Konstantina)
- Greek occupation names ηθοποιός (ithopios) "actor" for both male and female in Greek and γιατρός (giatros) "doctor" for both, but with informal female variants γιατρίνα (giatrina) and γιάτραινα (giatraina)
- Greek nationality names have five possibilities for 'English'.
  1. male: Άγγλος (Anglos)
  2. female: Αγγλίδα (Anglida)
  3. masculine: αγγλικός (anglikos)
  4. feminine: αγγλική (angliki)
  5. neuter: αγγλικό (angliko)

To complicate matters, Greek often offers additional informal versions of these. The corresponding for English are the following: εγγλέζος (englezos), Εγγλέζα (Engleza), εγγλέζικος (englezikos), εγγλέζικη (engleziki), εγγλέζικο (engleziko). The formal forms come from the name Αγγλία (Anglia) "England", while the less formal are derived from Italian inglese.

=== Meaning-based semantic criteria ===
In some languages, gender is determined by strictly semantic criteria, but in other languages, semantic criteria only partially determine gender.

==== Strict semantic criteria ====
In some languages, the gender of a noun is directly determined by its physical attributes (gender, animacy, etc.), and there are few or no exceptions to this rule. There are relatively few such languages. The Dravidian languages use this system as described below.

Another example is the Dizi language, which has two asymmetrical genders. The feminine includes all female living beings and diminutives; the masculine encompasses all other nouns (e.g. man, boy, pot, broom...). In this language, feminine nouns are always marked with -e or -in.

Another African language, Defaka, has three genders: one for all male humans, one for all female humans, and a third for all the remaining nouns. Gender is only marked in personal pronouns. Standard English pronouns are very similar in this respect, although the English gendered pronouns (he, she) are used for domestic animals if the gender of the animal is known, and sometimes for certain objects such as ships, e.g. "What happened to the Titanic? She (or it) sank."

==== Mostly semantic criteria ====
In some languages, the gender of nouns can mostly be determined by physical (semantic) attributes, although there remain some nouns whose gender is not assigned in this way (Corbett calls this "semantic residue"). The world view (e.g. mythology) of the speakers may influence the division of categories.

- Zande has four genders: male human, female human, animal, and inanimate. However, there are about 80 nouns representing inanimate entities which are nonetheless animate in gender: heavenly objects (moon, rainbow), metal objects (hammer, ring), edible plants (sweet potato, pea), and non-metallic objects (whistle, ball). Many have a round shape or can be explained by the role they play in mythology.
- Ket has three genders (masculine, feminine, and neuter), and most gender assignment is based on semantics, but there are many inanimate nouns outside the neuter class. Masculine nouns include male animates, most fish, trees, the moon, large wooden objects, most living beings and some religious items. Feminine nouns include female animates, three types of fish, some plants, the sun and other heavenly objects, some body parts and skin diseases, the soul, and some religious items. Words for part of a whole, as well as most other nouns that do not fall into any of the aforementioned classes, are neuter. The gender assignment of non-gender-differentiable things is complex. In general, those of no importance to the Kets are feminine, whereas objects of importance (e.g. fish, wood) are masculine. Mythology is again a significant factor.
- Alamblak has two genders, masculine and feminine. However, the masculine also includes things which are tall or long and slender, or narrow (e.g. fish, snakes, arrows and slender trees), whereas the feminine gender has things which are short, squat or wide (e.g. turtles, houses, shields and squat trees).
- In French, the distinction between the gender of a noun and the gender of the object it refers to is clear when nouns of different genders can be used for the same object, for example vélo (m.) = bicyclette (f.).

==== Contextual determination of gender ====
There are certain situations where the assignment of gender to a noun, pronoun or noun phrase may not be straightforward. This includes in particular:

- groups of mixed gender;
- references to people or things of unknown or unspecified gender.

In languages with masculine and feminine gender, the masculine is usually employed by default to refer to persons of unknown gender and to groups of people of mixed gender. Thus, in French the feminine plural pronoun elles always designates an all-female group of people (or stands for a group of nouns all of feminine gender), but the masculine equivalent ils may refer to a group of males or masculine nouns, to a mixed group, or to a group of people of unknown genders. In such cases, one says that the feminine gender is semantically marked, whereas the masculine gender is unmarked.

In English, the problem of gender determination does not arise in the plural, because gender in that language is reflected only in pronouns, and the plural pronoun they does not have gendered forms. In the singular, however, the issue frequently arises when a person of unspecified or unknown gender is being referred to. In this case the singular they has been traditional. Since the 18th century it has been prescribed to use the masculine (he), but other solutions are now often preferred.

In languages with a neuter gender, such as Slavic and Germanic languages, the neuter is often used for indeterminate gender reference, particularly when the things referred to are not people. In some cases this may even apply when referring to people, particularly children. For example, in English, one may use it to refer to a child, particularly when speaking generically rather than about a particular child of known gender.

In Icelandic (which preserves a masculine–feminine–neuter distinction in both singular and plural), the neuter plural can be used for groups of people of mixed gender, when specific people are meant. For example:

- þau (N.PL) höfðu hist í skóginum þegar kerlingin (F.SG) var ung stúlka og keisarinn (M.SG) óbreyttur prins. 'They (N.PL) had met in the forest when the old woman (F.SG) was a young girl and the emperor (M.SG) was only a prince.'

However, when referring to previously unmentioned groups of people or when referring to people in a generic way, especially when using an indefinite pronoun like 'some' or 'all', the masculine plural is used. For example:

- Sumir (M.PL) hafa þann sið að tala við sjálfa (M.PL) sig. 'Some people have the habit of talking to themselves.'

An example contrasting the two ways to refer to groups is the following, taken from advertisements of Christian congregations announcing their meetings:

- Allir (M.PL) velkomnir (M.PL) 'All welcome' is understood to be more general whereas Öll (N.PL) velkomin (N.PL) is more specific and emphasises the individuality of the group members.

That the masculine is seen in Icelandic as the most generic or 'unmarked' of the three genders can also be seen in the fact that the nouns for most professions are masculine. Even feminine job descriptions historically filled by women, like hjúkrunarkona 'nurse' and fóstra 'nursery school teacher' (both F.SG), have been replaced with masculine ones as men have started becoming more represented in these professions: hjúkrunarfræðingur 'nurse' and leikskólakennari 'nursery school teacher' (both M.SG).

In Swedish (which has an overall common–neuter gender system), masculinity may be argued to be a marked feature, because in the weak adjectival declension there is a distinct ending (-e) for naturally masculine nouns (as in min lillebror, "my little brother"). In spite of this, the third-person singular masculine pronoun han would normally be the default for a person of unknown gender, although in practice the indefinite pronoun man and the reflexive sig or its possessive forms sin/sitt/sina usually make this unnecessary.

In Polish, where a gender-like distinction is made in the plural between "masculine personal" and all other cases, a group is treated as masculine personal if it contains at least one male person.

In languages which preserve a three-way gender division in the plural, the rules for determining the gender (and sometimes number) of a coordinated noun phrase ("... and ...") may be quite complex. Czech is an example of such a language, with a division (in the plural) between masculine animate, masculine inanimate, feminine, and neuter. The rules for gender and number of coordinated phrases in that language are summarized at Czech declension § Gender and number of compound phrases.

=== Arbitrary conventional criteria ===
In some languages, any gender markers have been so eroded over time (possibly through deflexion) that they are no longer recognizable. Many German nouns, for example, do not indicate their gender through either meaning or form. In such cases a noun's gender must simply be memorized, and gender can be regarded as an integral part of each noun when considered as an entry in the speaker's lexicon. (This is reflected in dictionaries, which typically indicate the gender of noun headwords where applicable.)

Second-language learners are often encouraged to memorize a modifier, usually a definite article, in conjunction with each noun—for example, a learner of French may learn the word for "chair" as la chaise (meaning "the chair"); this carries the information that the noun is chaise, and that it is feminine (because la is the feminine singular form of the definite article).

== Gender shifts ==
It is possible for a noun to have more than one gender. Such gender shifts are sometimes correlated with meaning shifts, and sometimes yield doublets with no difference in meaning. Moreover, gender shifts sometimes crosscut number contrasts, such that the singular form of a noun has one gender, and plural form of the noun has a different gender.

=== Meaningful ===
Gender shift may be associated with a difference in the gender of the referent, as with nouns such as comunista in Spanish, which may be either masculine or feminine, depending on whether it refers to a male or a female. It may also correspond to some other difference in the meaning of the word. For example, the German word See meaning "lake" is masculine, whereas the identical word meaning "sea" is feminine. The meanings of the Norwegian noun ting have diverged further: masculine en ting is "a thing", whereas neuter et ting is "an assembly". (The parliament is the Storting, "the Great Ting"; the other tings like Borgarting are the regional courts.)

It is a matter of analysis how to draw the line between a single polysemous word with multiple genders and a set of homonyms with one gender each. For example, Bulgarian has a pair of homonyms пръст (prəst) which are etymologically unrelated. One is masculine and means "finger"; the other is feminine and means "soil".

=== Meaningless ===
In other cases, a word may be usable in multiple genders indifferently. For example, in Bulgarian the word пу̀стош, (pustosh, "wilderness") may be either masculine (definite form пу̀стоша, pustoshə) or feminine (definite form пустошта̀, pustoshta) without any change in meaning and no preference in usage.

In Norwegian, many nouns can be either feminine or masculine according to the dialect, level of formality or whim of the speaker/writer. Even the two written forms of the language have many nouns whose gender is optional. Choosing the masculine gender will often seem more formal than using the feminine. This might be because before the creation of Norwegian Nynorsk and Norwegian Bokmål in the late 19th century, Norwegians wrote in Danish, which has lost the feminine gender, thus usage of the masculine gender (corresponding exactly to Danish common gender in conjugation in Norwegian Bokmål) is more formal sounding to modern Norwegians.

The word for "sun" can be another example. One might decline it masculine: En sol, solen, soler, solene, or feminine: Ei sol, sola, soler, solene, in Norwegian Bokmål. The same goes for a lot of common words like bok (book), dukke (doll), bøtte (bucket) and so forth. Many of the words where it is possible to choose gender are inanimate objects that one might suspect would be conjugated with the neuter gender. Nouns conjugated with the neuter gender cannot normally be conjugated as feminine or masculine in Norwegian. There is also a slight tendency towards using the masculine indefinite article even when choosing the feminine conjugation of a noun in many eastern Norwegian dialects. For instance, the word for "girl" is declined: En jente, jenta, jenter, jentene.

=== Associated with number contrasts ===
Sometimes a noun's gender can change between its plural and singular forms, as with the French words amour ("love"), délice ("delight") and orgue ("organ" as musical instrument), all of which are masculine in the singular but feminine in the plural. These anomalies may have a historical explanation (amour used to be feminine in the singular too) or result from slightly different notions (orgue in the singular is usually a barrel organ, whereas the plural orgues usually refers to the collection of columns in a church organ). Further examples are the Italian words uovo ("egg") and braccio ("arm"). These are masculine in the singular, but form the irregular plurals uova and braccia, which have the endings of the feminine singular, but have feminine plural agreement. (This is related to the forms of the second declension Latin neuter nouns from which they derive: ovum and bracchium, with nominative plurals ova and bracchia.) In other cases, the anomaly can be explained by the form of the noun, as is the case in Scottish Gaelic. Masculine nouns which form their plural by palatalization of their final consonant can change gender in their plural form, as a palatalized final consonant is often a marker of a feminine noun, e.g. balach beag ("small boy"), but balaich bheaga ("small boys"), with the adjective showing agreement for both feminine gender (lenition of initial consonant) and plural number (suffixed -a).

== Gender across languages ==
Related languages need not assign the same gender to a noun: this shows that gender can vary across related languages. Conversely, unrelated languages that are in contact can impact how a borrowed noun is assigned gender, with either the borrowing or the donor language determining the gender of the borrowed word.

=== Gender can vary across related languages ===
Nouns which have the same meanings in different languages need not have the same gender. This is particularly so in the case of things with no natural gender, such as gender-less objects. For example, there is, by all appearances, nothing about a table that should cause it to be associated with any particular gender, and different languages' words for "table" are found to have various genders: feminine, as with the French table; masculine, as with German Tisch; or neuter, as with Norwegian bord. (Even within a given language, nouns that denote the same concept may differ in gender—for example, of three German words for "car", Wagen is masculine whereas Auto is neuter, and Karre is feminine.)

Cognate nouns in closely related languages are likely to have the same gender, because they tend to inherit the gender of the original word in the parent language. For instance, in the Romance languages, the words for "sun" are masculine, being derived from the Latin masculine noun sol, whereas the words for "moon" are feminine, being derived from the Latin feminine luna. (This contrasts with the genders found in German, where Sonne "sun" is feminine, and Mond "moon" is masculine, as well as in other Germanic languages.) However, there are exceptions to this principle. For instance, latte ("milk") is masculine in Italian (as are French lait and Portuguese leite), whereas Spanish leche is feminine and Romanian lapte is neuter. Likewise, the word for "boat" is neuter in German (das Boot), but common gender in Swedish (en båt).

Some more examples of the above phenomena are given below. (These come mostly from the Slavic languages, where gender largely correlates with the noun ending.)

- The Russian word луна ("moon") is feminine, whereas месяц ("crescent moon", also meaning "month") is masculine. In Polish, another Slavic language, the word for moon is księżyc, which is masculine.
- Russian also has two words for "potato": картофель which is masculine, and картошка which is feminine.
- In Polish the loanword tramwaj ("tram") is masculine, whereas the cognate loanword in Czech, tramvaj, is feminine.
- The Polish word tysiąc ("thousand") is masculine, whereas the cognate in Russian, тысяча, is feminine, while the Icelandic cognate þúsund is neuter.
- The Spanish word origen ("origin") is masculine, but its close relatives origem (from Portuguese), orixe (from Asturian) and origem/orixe from Galician are feminine.
- The French word équipe ("team") is feminine, while the Spanish word equipo is masculine. The Spanish form contrasts with the Portuguese equipa/equipe, both of which are feminine.
- The Italian word scimmia ("ape") is feminine, whereas the Spanish word simio is masculine.
- The French word mer is feminine, but the Spanish cognate mar is generally masculine (except in some poetic contexts and among sea workers), whereas the Catalan cognate mar can be masculine or feminine, depending on the dialect. All these words mean "sea" and are descended from the Latin mare, which was neuter.

=== How languages assign gender to borrowed words ===
Borrowed words are assigned gender in one of two ways:

- via criteria determined by the borrowing language;
- via criteria determined by the donor language.

==== Borrowing language can determine gender ====
Ibrahim identifies several processes by which a language assigns a gender to a newly borrowed word; these processes follow patterns by which even children, through their subconscious recognition of patterns, can often correctly predict a noun's gender.

1. If the noun is animate, natural gender tends to dictate grammatical gender.
2. The borrowed word tends to take the gender of the native word it replaces. According to Ghil'ad Zuckermann, morphemic adaptations of English words into American Italian or British Italian are abundant with such cases. For example, the feminine gender of the British Italian word bagga "bag" was induced by the feminine gender of the Italian word borsa "bag".
3. If the borrowed word happens to have a suffix that the borrowing language uses as a gender marker, the suffix tends to dictate gender.
4. If the borrowed word rhymes with one or more native words, the latter tend to dictate gender.
5. The default assignment is the borrowing language's unmarked gender.
6. Rarely, the word retains the gender it had in the donor language. This tends to happen more frequently in more formal language such as scientific terms, where some knowledge of the donor language can be expected.

Sometimes the gender of a word switches with time. For example, the Russian modern loanword виски (viski) "whisky" was originally feminine, then masculine, and today it has become neuter.

==== Donor language can determine gender ====
Ghil'ad Zuckermann argues that the cross-lingual retention of grammatical gender can change not only the lexis of the target language but also its morphology. For example, gender can indirectly influence the productivity of noun-patterns in Modern Hebrew (which he calls the "Israeli language"): the neologism מברשת (mivréshet, transl. brush) is fitted into the feminine noun-pattern mi⌂⌂é⌂et (each ⌂ represents a slot where a radical is inserted) because of the feminine gender of the matched words for "brush" such as Arabic mábrasha, Yiddish barsht, Russian shchëtka, Polish kiść (transl. painting brush) and szczotka, German Bürste and French brosse, all feminine.

Similarly, argues Zuckermann, the neologism for "library", ספריה (sifriá), matches the feminine gender of the parallel pre-existent European words – Greek bibliothḗkē, adapted into many European languages – as well as of the pre-existent Arabic word for "library": مكتبة (máktaba, also feminine. The result of this neologism might have been, more generally, the strengthening of Hebrew יה- (-iá) as a productive feminine locative suffix (combined with the influence of Polish -ja and Russian -ия (-iya)).

== Distribution of gender in the world's languages ==
Grammatical gender is a common phenomenon in the world's languages. A typological survey of 174 languages revealed that over one quarter of them had grammatical gender. WALS found that, of the 256 languages studied from around the world, gender was used in approximately half.

Gender systems rarely overlap with numerical classifier systems. Gender and noun class systems are usually found in fusional or agglutinating languages, whereas classifiers are more typical of isolating languages. Thus, according to Johanna Nichols, these characteristics correlate positively with the presence of grammatical gender in the world's languages:

- location in an area with languages featuring noun classes;
- preference for head-marking morphology;
- moderate to high morphological complexity;
- non-accusative alignment.

Grammatical gender is found in many Indo-European languages (including Spanish, Portuguese, French, Russian, and German—but not English, Bengali, Armenian or Persian, for example), Afroasiatic languages (which includes the Semitic and Berber languages, etc.), and in other language families such as Dravidian (including Tamil but not Malayalam, for example) and Northeast Caucasian (Chechen but not Lezgian, for example), as well as several Australian Aboriginal languages such as Dyirbal, and Kalaw Lagaw Ya. Most Niger–Congo languages also have extensive systems of noun classes, which can be grouped into several grammatical genders.

Conversely, grammatical gender is usually absent from the Koreanic, Japonic, Tungusic, Turkic, Mongolic, Austronesian, Sino-Tibetan, Uralic and most Native American language families.

Modern English makes use of gender in pronouns, which are generally marked for natural gender, but lacks a system of gender concord within the noun phrase which is one of the central elements of grammatical gender in most other Indo-European languages.

=== Indo-European ===
Many Indo-European languages, but not English, provide examples of grammatical gender.

Research indicates that the earliest stages of Proto-Indo-European had two genders (animate and inanimate), as did Hittite, the earliest attested Indo-European language. The classification of nouns based on animacy and inanimacy and the lack of gender are today characteristic of Armenian. According to the theory, the animate gender, which (unlike the inanimate) had independent vocative and accusative forms, later split into masculine and feminine, thus originating the three-way classification into masculine, feminine and neuter.

Many Indo-European languages retained the three genders, including most Slavic languages, Latin, Sanskrit, Ancient and Modern Greek, German, Icelandic, Romanian and Asturian (two Romance language exceptions). In them, there is a high but not absolute correlation between grammatical gender and declensional class. Many linguists believe that to be true of the middle and late stages of Proto-Indo-European.

However, many languages reduced the number of genders to two. Some lost the neuter, leaving masculine and feminine as in Vulgar Latin then most Romance languages; a few traces of the Latin neuter remain, such as the distinct Spanish pronoun ello and Italian nouns with so-called "mobile gender". Hindustani and the Celtic languages also dropped neuter. Others merged feminine and masculine into a common gender but retained the neuter, as in Swedish and Danish, and to some extent in Dutch. Finally, some languages, such as English and Afrikaans, have nearly completely lost grammatical gender (retaining only some traces, such as the English pronouns he, she, they, and it—Afrikaans hy, sy, hulle, and dit); Armenian, Bengali, Persian, Sorani Kurdish, Ossetic, Odia, Khowar, and Kalasha-mun have lost it entirely.

On the other hand, some Slavic languages can be argued to have added new genders to the classical three.

==== English ====
Although grammatical gender was a fully productive inflectional category in Old English, Modern English has a much less pervasive gender system, primarily based on natural gender and reflected essentially in pronouns only.

There are a few traces of gender marking in Modern English:

- Some words take different derived forms depending on the natural gender of the referent, such as waiter/waitress and widow/widower.
- The third-person singular personal pronouns (and their possessive forms) are gender specific: he/him/his (masculine gender, used for men, boys, and male animals), she/her(s) (feminine gender, for women, girls, and female animals), the singular they/them/their(s) (common gender, used for people or animals of unknown, irrelevant, or non-binary gender), and it/its (neuter gender, mainly for objects, abstractions and animals). (There are also distinct personal and non-personal forms but no differentiation by natural gender in the case of certain interrogative and relative pronouns: who/whom for persons, corresponding to he, she, and the singular they; and which corresponding to it.)

However, these are relatively insignificant features compared with a typical language with full grammatical gender. English nouns are not generally considered to belong to gender classes in the way that French, German or Russian nouns are. There is no gender agreement in English between nouns and their modifiers (articles, other determiners, or adjectives, with the occasional exception such as blond/blonde, a spelling convention borrowed from French). Gender agreement applies in effect only to pronouns, with the choice of pronoun determined through semantics and pragmatics rather than on any conventional assignment of particular nouns to particular genders.

Only a relatively small number of English nouns have distinct male and female forms; many of them are loanwords from non-Germanic languages (the suffixes -rix and -ress in words such as aviatrix and waitress, for instance, derive directly or indirectly from Latin). English has no live productive gender markers. An example of such a marker might be the suffix -ette (of French provenance), but this is seldom used today, surviving mostly in either historical contexts or with disparaging or humorous intent.

The gender of an English pronoun typically coincides with the natural gender of its referent, rather than with the grammatical gender of its antecedent. The choice between she, he, they, and it comes down to whether the pronoun is intended to designate a woman, a man, or someone or something else. There are certain exceptions, however:

- With animals, it is usually used, but when the gender of the animal is known, it may be referred to as he or she, particularly when expressing an emotional connection with the animal, as with a pet.
- Certain non-human things can be referred to with the pronoun she (her, hers), particularly countries and ships, and sometimes other vehicles or machines. This figure of speech is referred to as metaphorical gender. It is in decline, and advised against by many style guides.

Problems arise when selecting a personal pronoun to refer to someone of unspecified or unknown gender. In the past and to some degree still in the present, the masculine has been used as the "default" gender in English. The use of the plural pronoun they with singular reference is common in practice. The neuter it may be used for a baby but not normally for an older child or adult. Other genderless pronouns exist, such as the impersonal pronoun one, but they are not generally substitutable for a personal pronoun.

==== Slavic languages ====
The Slavic languages mostly continue the Proto-Indo-European system of three genders, masculine, feminine and neuter. Gender correlates largely with noun endings (masculine nouns typically end in a consonant, feminines in -a and neuters in -o or -e) but there are many exceptions, particularly in the case of nouns whose stems end in a soft consonant. However, some of the languages, including Russian, Czech, Slovak and Polish, also make certain additional grammatical distinctions between animate and inanimate nouns: Polish in the plural, and Russian in the accusative case, differentiate between human and non-human nouns.

In Russian, the different treatment of animate nouns involves their accusative case (and that of adjectives qualifying them) being formed identically to the genitive rather than to the nominative. In the singular that applies to masculine nouns only, but in the plural it applies in all genders.

A similar system applies in Czech, but the situation is somewhat different in the plural: Only masculine nouns are affected, and the distinctive feature is a particular inflective ending for masculine animate nouns in the nominative plural, and for adjectives and verbs agreeing with those nouns.

Polish morphology might be said to distinguish five genders: personal masculine (referring to male humans), animate non-personal masculine, inanimate masculine, feminine, and neuter. The animate–inanimate opposition for the masculine gender applies in the singular, and the personal–impersonal opposition, which classes animals along with inanimate objects, applies in the plural. (A few nouns denoting inanimate things are treated grammatically as animate and vice versa.) The manifestations of the differences are as follows:

- In the singular, masculine animates (in the standard declension) have an accusative form identical to the genitive, and masculine inanimates have accusative identical to the nominative. The same applies to adjectives qualifying these nouns, the same as in Russian and Czech. Also, Polish masculine animates always form their genitive in -a, whereas in the case of inanimates some use -a and some -u:
  animate: dobry klient ("good customer"; nominative); dobrego klienta (accusative and genitive)
  animate: dobry pies ("good dog"; nominative); dobrego psa (accusative and genitive)
  inanimate: dobry ser ("good cheese"; nominative and accusative); dobrego sera (genitive only)
- In the plural, masculine personal nouns (but not other animate nouns) take accusatives that are identical to the genitives; they also typically take different endings in the nominative (e.g. -i rather than -y). Such endings also appear on adjectives and past tense verbs. The two features are analogous to features of Russian and Czech respectively, except that those languages make an animate/inanimate distinction rather than personal/impersonal) . Examples of the Polish system:
  personal: dobrzy klienci ("good customers"; nominative); dobrych klientów (accusative and genitive)
  impersonal: dobre psy ("good dogs"; nominative and accusative); dobrych psów (genitive only)
  impersonal: dobre sery ("good cheeses"; nominative and accusative); dobrych serów (genitive only)

A few nouns have both personal and impersonal forms, depending on meaning for example, klient may behave as an impersonal noun when it refers to a client in the computing sense.

=== Dravidian ===
In Tamil and some other Dravidian languages, nouns are classified primarily on the basis of their semantic properties. The highest-level classification of nouns is often described as being between "rational" and "nonrational". Nouns representing humans and deities are considered rational, and other nouns (those representing animals and objects) are treated as nonrational. Within the rational class there are further subdivisions into masculine, feminine and collective nouns.

=== Austronesian ===
In the Austronesian Wuvulu-Aua language, vocative words used when addressing a relative often specify the speaker's gender. For example, tafi means 'sister of female', ʔari means opposite-gender sibling, and wane means female's father's sister or female's brother's daughter.

== See also ==
- Gender agreement in binomial nomenclature
- Gender-neutral language
- Gender neutrality in genderless languages
- Gender neutrality in languages with grammatical gender
- Gender-neutral language in English
- Gender-specific job title
- Generic antecedents
- Grammatical conjugation
- Polarity of gender

== Bibliography ==
- Bradley, Peter (2004). Spanish: An Essential Grammar. Psychology Press. ISBN 978-0415286435.
- Corbett, Greville G. (1991). Gender. Cambridge University Press.
- Corbett, Greville G. (1994). "Gender and gender systems". In Asher, R. (ed.). The Encyclopedia of Language and Linguistics. Oxford: Pergamon Press. pp. 1347–1353.
- Craig, Colette G., ed. (1986). Noun Classes and Categorization: Proceedings of a Symposium on Categorization and Noun Classification, Eugene, Oregon, October 1983. Amsterdam: John Benjamins Publishing.
- Crespo Cantalapiedra, I. (2025). La diversidad en las lenguas: el género gramatical. Online book (in Spanish).
- Foley, William A.; Van Valin, Robert D. Jr (13 September 1984). Functional Syntax and Universal Grammar. Cambridge University Press. ISBN 978-0-521-26904-9.
- Franceschina, Florencia (2005). Fossilized Second Language Grammars: The Acquisition of Grammatical Gender. John Benjamins Publishing. p. 299. ISBN 90-272-5298-X.
- Greenberg, J. H. (1978). "How does a language acquire gender markers?". In Greenberg, J. H.; Ferguson, Charles A.; Moravcsik, Edith A. (eds.). Universals of Human Language. Vol. 4: Syntax. Stanford University Press. pp. 47–82.
- Hockett, Charles F. (1958). A Course in Modern Linguistics. Macmillan.
- Ibrahim, Muhammad Hasan (1973). Grammatical gender: Its Origin and Development. Mouton.
- Iturrioz, J. L. (1986). "Structure, meaning and function: A functional analysis of gender and other classificatory techniques". Función. 1: 1–3.
- Mercier, Adele (2002). "L'Homme et la factrice: Sur la logique du genre en français". Dialogue (in French). 41 (3): 481–516. doi:10.1017/S0012217300005230.
- Pinker, Steven (1994). The Language Instinct. William Morrow & Co.
- Di Garbo, Francesca; Olsson, Bruno; Wälchli, Bernhard (2019). Di Garbo, F.; Olsson, B.; Wälchli, B. (eds.). Grammatical Gender and Linguistic Complexity. Vol. I: General Issues and Specific Studies. Berlin: Language Science Press. doi:10.5281/zenodo.3446224. ISBN 978-3-96110-179-5.
- Di Garbo, Francesca; Olsson, Bruno; Wälchli, Bernhard (2019). Di Garbo, F.; Olsson, B.; Wälchli, B. (eds.). Grammatical Gender and Linguistic Complexity. Vol. II: World-wide Comparative Studies. Berlin: Language Science Press. doi:10.5281/zenodo.3446230. ISBN 978-3-96110-181-8.
