= LGBTQ rights in Amazonas =

- Location of Amazonas in Brazil.
- Legal status: Legal since 1830, age of consent equalised
- Gender identity: Gender change allowed, official standard for altering legal sex doesn't require surgery since 2018
- Military: Allowed to serve openly
- Discrimination protections: Since 2006

Family rights
- Recognition of relationships: Same-sex marriage since 2013
- Adoption: Legal since 2015

Lesbian, gay, bisexual, transgender and queer (LGBTQ) rights in the Brazilian state of Amazonas have had significant legal advances in recent decades. Homosexuality has been legal in the state, as well as throughout Brazil, since 1830.

== Legality ==
In 1830, Brazilian Emperor Dom Pedro I sanctioned the Imperial Penal Code, removing all references to sodomy from Brazilian law.

Same-sex marriage has been legal in Amazonas since 2013 via a decision by the National Council of Justice, in compliance with a previous decision of the Supreme Federal Court in 2011. Between 2020 and 2025, there was a 328% increase in same-sex marriages in the state, with 287 unions registered in 2024 and 98 in the first five months of 2025.

In November 2012, a judge from the Amazonas Court of Justice ruled that a same-sex couple could adopt a child in the state, making them the first couple to do so. In 2015, the Supreme Federal Court legalized same-sex adoption nationwide.

== Discrimination protections ==
Since 2006, Amazonas has included discrimination based on sexual orientation and gender identity in its state policies. Furthermore, homophobia and transphobia have been criminalized nationwide since 2019, making them equivalent to the crime of racism.

In 2021, the Amazonas State Public Defender's Office (DPE-AM) established the Sexual Diversity, Gender Identity and Citizenship Working Group (Portuguese: Grupo de Trabalho Diversidade Sexual, Identidade de Gênero e Cidadania) focused on human rights violations and training of security agents.

In 2023, the Legislative Assembly of Amazonas signed Law 6,176/2023 (Portuguese: Lei 6.176/2023) authored by state deputies Sinésio Campos (PT) and Nejmi Aziz (PSD), which institutes the State Week of Visibility and Promotion of Rights of the LGBTQIA+ Population (Portuguese: Semana Estadual da Visibilidade e Promoção de Direitos da População LGBTQIA+).

In August 2024, the Amazonas State Court of Justice (TJAM) released the booklet Home is a Right! (Portuguese: Lar é Direito!) aimed at LGBTQ youth who have been expelled from their homes. The booklet also states that conversion therapies are "prohibited and ineffective."

== Transgender rights ==
In March 2018, the Brazilian Supreme Federal Court unanimously ruled that transgender people may change their legal gender without undergoing surgery or hormonal therapy, which were previously requirements. A transgender individual seeking to change their gender to reflect their gender identity can now simply apply to do so at a registry post in the country, without the need of a judicial document or any medical report. It was reported that by 2024 the percentage of gender changes in official documents at registry offices increased by 59%.

On 18 October 2022, the mayor of Manaus, David Almeida, signed a law banning unisex restrooms in the city.

In November 2023, the Public Defender's Office of the State of Amazonas opened a process to monitor public health services for transgender and travesti people, including the provision of hormones and surgeries.

In August 2024, the Federal Public Prosecutor's Office (MPF) recommended that the state of Amazonas formally enable outpatient and hospital services for the transsexualization process, including sexual reassignment surgeries, establishing deadlines for approval and presentation of these proposals to the Ministry of Health.

On 10 June 2025, State Governor Wilson Lima signed Law No. 7,552 into law, banning gender-affirming care for minors under the age of 18 in the state.

=== Non-binary gender recognition ===
Amazonas does not have specific laws recognizing non-binary gender. In 2022, Álex Souza de Sá became the first non-binary person in the state to receive recognition at a notary's office, having their documents rectified in the state of Rio de Janeiro. After arriving in the state's capital, Manaus, Álex discovered that the notary's office where they were registered did not have a gender-neutral marker. After six months of insistence, they appealed to the state's Public Defender's Office and obtained recognition of their documents.

== Censorship ==
=== Gender-neutral language ban in schools ===
State Law No. 6,463/2023 (Portuguese: Lei Estadual nº 6.463/2023) prohibited the use of gender-neutral language in public and private schools. The law was proposed by state deputy Débora Menezes (PL) and approved by the Legislative Assembly of Amazonas with 14 votes in favor and 4 against.

The National LGBTI Alliance and the Brazilian Association of Homotransaffective Families (Abrafh) filed an ADI (Direct Action of Unconstitutionality) with the Supreme Federal Court (STF) to overturn the law. The entities claimed that State Law No. 6,463/2023 is unconstitutional because "it invades the National Congress's authority to legislate on educational guidelines and bases".

On 29 May, Justice Flávio Dino suspended the state law through an injunction and responded to the entities:

In the absence of national legislation regarding gender-neutral language, any state, district, or municipal legislation that authorizes or prohibits its use will be tainted by the defect of formal unconstitutionality, as is the case with the legislation analyzed in these proceedings. There is no doubt that language is alive, always open to new possibilities in different spaces and times, so the possibility of using gender-neutral language cannot be ruled out.

In July 2024, the Supreme Court justices confirmed Dino's decision and blocked the enforcement of state law.

On 27 December 2026, the Supreme Court officially struck down the law.

=== Social media ===
On 17 October 2024, the Legislative Assembly of Amazonas enacted a law prohibiting "the reproduction of digital media that uses children linked to homosexuality." The law was proposed by the state deputy Carlinhos Bessa (PV-AM) and approved with 21 votes in favor, none against, and 3 abstentions.

On 13 December 2025, the law was amended through bill 816/2024, also proposed by Carlinhos Bessa, removing the term "homosexuality". Since then, current law prohibits "the reproduction of sexual content linked to children in cultural and artistic media."

=== Pride parades ===
State Law 6,469/2023 (Portuguese: Lei Estadual 6.469/2023) prohibits the participation of children and adolescents in pride parades, establishing fines of up to R$10,000 in case of non-compliance with the law.

== Life conditions ==
=== Demographics ===
A 2019 survey conducted by the Brazilian Institute of Geography and Statistics (IBGE) revealed that at least 60,000 adults in Amazonas declared themselves homosexual or bisexual. This figure is equivalent to 2.7% of the state's population, where 2.5 million (94.1%) declared themselves heterosexual, in addition to 1.7 million who stated they did not know their sexual orientation and 3.6 million who did not want to answer.

In Manaus, among 1.5 million inhabitants aged 18 or over, 1.4 million (93.4%) declared themselves heterosexual; 46 thousand (3.0%) homosexual or bisexual, and 56 thousand people (3.6%) did not know or did not want to answer about their sexual orientation.

=== Anti-LGBTQ violence ===
According to research from the Brazilian Journal of Public Security, cases of violence against LGBTQ in the state are underreported. According to data from the Brazilian Public Security Forum, cases of violence against LGBTQ people have increased, with 43 cases registered.

On 5 July 2025, Fernando Vilaça de Souza was beaten and killed after reacting to homophobic insults in Manaus. The Ministry of Human Rights and Citizenship, the Order of Attorneys of Brazil and federal deputy Erika Hilton expressed regret over the incident. According to residents of the area, Fernando was previously being bullied by other young people in the region.

== Summary table ==
Same-sex sexual activity legal	Yes (Since 1830)
Equal age of consent	Yes (Since 1830)
Anti-discrimination laws in employment only	Yes (Since 2006)
Anti-discrimination laws in the provision of goods and services	Yes (Since 2006)
Anti-discrimination laws in all other areas (Incl. indirect discrimination, hate speech)	Yes (Since 2006)
Same-sex marriages	Yes (Since 2013)
Recognition of same-sex couples	Yes (Since 2011)
Stepchild adoption by same-sex couples	Yes (Nationwide since 2015)
Joint adoption by same-sex couples	Yes (Starting in 2012; Nationwide since 2015)
LGBTQ people allowed to serve openly in the military	Yes
Freedom of expression	Yes / No (Restricted in pride parades since 2024)
Right to change legal gender	Yes (Since 2008; gender self-determination since 2018)
Third gender option	Yes / No (Partially recognized in a specific case)
Conversion therapy by medical professionals banned	Yes (Since 1999 for homosexuals and since 2018 for transgender people)
Access to transition related healthcare for minors with gender dysphoria	No (Banned since 2025)
Gender-neutral bathrooms	Yes / No (Banned in Manaus since 2026)
Access to IVF for lesbians	Yes
Commercial surrogacy for gay male couples	No (Banned for any couple regardless of sexual orientation)
MSMs allowed to donate blood	Yes (Since 2020)

== See also ==
- LGBTQ rights in Brazil
