= Include Mx =

Online social campaign

- Formation: 2020
- Purpose: Social activism
- Leader: Tom Pashby
- Website: IncludeMx

Include Mx is a campaign in the United Kingdom whose primary goal is to promote the inclusion of the title Mx on online forms. Mx is a title often used by non-binary individuals, or those who do not wish to disclose their gender. The campaign also promotes companies that have already included the option.

== Purpose ==
The primary activity of Include Mx is advocating for the inclusion of the gender-neutral title Mx on forms, especially in places where multiple options such as professor or Viscount already exist. Tom Pashby, the leader of the campaign, stated in an interview with the newspaper i that the inclusion of the Mx title is "about respect". They furthered that "not all people who use Mx are non-binary, and some people do just want to not have to supply their gender identity to a company".

Include Mx directly contacts and calls out companies who do not include the title, especially those that the organisation accuses of pinkwashing, which is where companies use the aesthetics of LGBT inclusion without making meaningful changes to their internal structures. For example, the campaign tweeted at the Post Office in December 2020, asking the company to include Mx on its general enquiries form. In June 2023, Include Mx tweeted at the company again, stating that it "implied it might Mx nearly three years ago", but that it still had not.

The campaign also celebrates companies that have added the title. For example, in June 2023, Include Mx wrote a thread of tweets about companies who had switched to using logos incorporating the pride flag. In this thread, they thanked Tesco, Screwfix, and Royal Mail for including the title.

== Formation ==
Include Mx was first launched in 2020 by Tom Pashby, then a master's student at Sussex University in Falmer. When asked why they started the campaign, they stated the following:

I started Include Mx because I was frustrated at being forced into using incorrect titles to be able to access goods and services like online deliveries. [...] Given that lots of organisations include extensive lists of titles including things like Viscount and Prof, but not Mx, it strikes me that this situation needs changing. Lots of other people like me will also be very frustrated. I’m running this as a ’micro campaign’, exclusively focused on celebrating organisations which include Mx, and encouraging other organisations to add Mx, because I know this is an achievable win for a lot of organisations. It will make thousands of people across the UK happier when they see their existence being acknowledged by institutions.

The campaign gained traction through media outlets such as The Tab, PinkNews, and i.

== Success ==
The campaign claims that its activities have successfully pressured several companies into including the title. For example, on 5 December 2020, Include Mx tweeted at Wilko asking them to add Mx to their online registration form, The company responded on 11 December, stating that they would "ensure this is passed on to the relevant department". On 17 February 2021, the campaign reported that the option was now available.

However, not all campaigns from the group have been successful. In July 2022, Include Mx started a petition to get Argos to include the title on their online forms. This petition reached over 10,000 signatures in nine days. Sainsbury's, Argos' parent company, stated in response that it "wanted to offer [the title] across [its] entire business" and that customers should "bear with [it] while this is worked through". However, The Retail Bulletin reported in June 2023 that Sainsbury's had not yet fully implemented the use of the title throughout its business, including in the Argos brand.

== See also ==
- Legal recognition of non-binary gender
- Non-binary discrimination
- Transgender rights
