= Legal recognition of non-binary gender =

World map as of November 2025 Non-binary / third gender option available as voluntary opt-in, at least one district Opt-in for foreign-born nationals if recognized in country of origin. Opt-in for intersex people only Standard for third gender Standard for intersex Non-binary / third gender option not legally recognized / no data

Multiple countries legally recognize non-binary or third gender classifications. These classifications are typically based on a person's gender identity. In some countries, such classifications may only be available to intersex people, born with sex characteristics that "do not fit the typical definitions for male or female bodies."

== History ==
In recent years, some societies have begun to legally recognize non-binary, genderqueer, or third gender identities. Some non-western societies have long recognized transgender people as a third gender, though this may not (or may only recently) include internationally recognized legal rights for such people. This has much more to do with the nature of the legal system towards gender than the nature of the societies towards it, as referenced by the distinct cultural place and societal recognition privileging members of the third gender in non-Western societies which recognize them—five examples being pre-colonial Inca Qariwarmi, Pali pandakas, androgynes in the Talmud, Hijras as described further below, and the Inuit third gender.

Among western nations, Australia may have been the first to recognize a third classification, with Alex MacFarlane, who is intersex, receiving a passport with sex marked as indeterminate in 2003. Transgender advocate Norrie May-Welby was recognized as having unspecified status in 2014. In 2016, an Oregon circuit court ruled that Elisa Rae Shupe could legally change gender to non-binary.

=== Transgender people ===
The Open Society Foundations published a report, License to Be Yourself, in May 2014, documenting "some of the world's most progressive and rights-based laws and policies that enable trans people to change their gender identity on official documents." The report comments on the recognition of third classifications, stating:

From a rights-based perspective, third sex / gender options should be voluntary, providing trans people with a third choice about how to define their gender identity. Those identifying as a third sex / gender should have the same rights as those identifying as male or female.

The document also quotes Mauro Cabral of Global Action for Trans Equality:

People tend to identify a third sex with freedom from the gender binary, but that is not necessarily the case. If only trans and/or intersex people can access that third category, or if they are compulsively assigned to a third sex, then the gender binary gets stronger, not weaker.

The report concludes that two or three options are insufficient: "A more inclusive approach would be to increase options for people to self-define their sex and gender identity."

=== Intersex people ===
Like all individuals, some intersex individuals may be raised as a particular sex (male or female) but then identify with another later in life, while most do not. A 2012 clinical review suggests that between 8.5 and 20% of persons with intersex conditions may experience gender dysphoria, distress or discomfort as a result of the sex and gender they were assigned at birth. Australian sociological research published in 2016 shows that 19% of 272 people born with atypical sex characteristics participating in the study selected an "X" or "other" option, while 52% are women, 23% men and 6% unsure.

According to the Asia Pacific Forum of National Human Rights Institutions, few countries have provided for the legal recognition of intersex people. The Asia Pacific Forum states that the legal recognition of intersex people is firstly about access to the same rights as other men and women, when assigned male or female; secondly it is about access to administrative corrections to legal documents when an original sex assignment is not appropriate; and thirdly, while opt in schemes may help some individuals, legal recognition is not about the creation of a third sex or gender classification for intersex people as a population.

In March 2017, an Australian and New Zealand community statement called for an end to legal classification of sex, stating that legal third classifications, like binary classifications, were based on structural violence and failed to respect diversity and a "right to self-determination". It also called for the criminalization of deferrable intersex medical interventions.

== By jurisdiction ==
Many countries have adopted laws recognizing non-binary gender identities.

=== Africa ===
==== Kenya ====
In 2022, Kenya passed the Children Act 2022, requiring an "I" gender marker for intersex people.

=== Asia ===
==== India ====
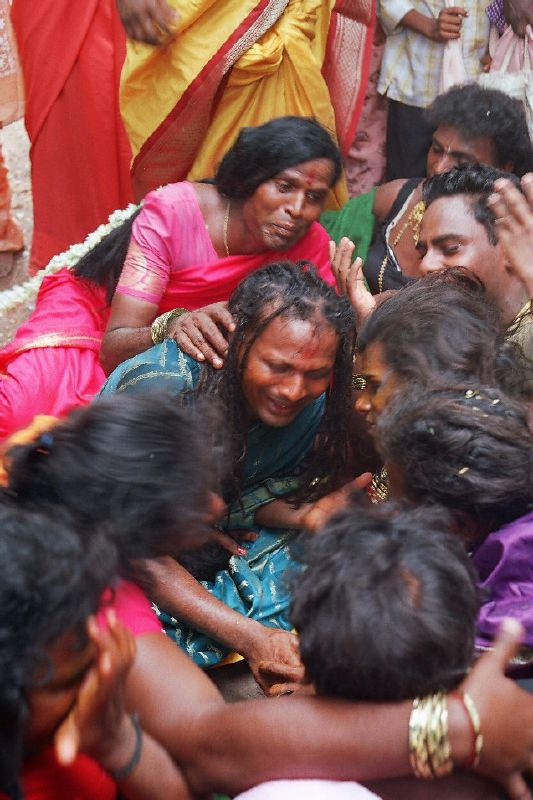
Aravanis—the Hijra "brides" of Aravan—mourn his death

The Hijra of India are probably the most well known and populous third sex type in the modern world – Mumbai-based community health organization The Humsafar Trust estimates there are between 5 and 6 million hijras in India. In different areas they are known as Aravani/Aruvani or Jogappa. Often (somewhat misleadingly) called eunuchs in English, they may be born intersex or apparently male, dress in feminine clothes and generally see themselves as neither men nor women. Only eight percent of hijras visiting Humsafar clinics are nirwaan (castrated). Indian photographer Dayanita Singh writes about her friendship with a Hijra, Mona Ahmed, and their two different societies' beliefs about gender: "When I once asked her if she would like to go to Singapore for a sex change operation, she told me, 'You really do not understand. I am the third sex, not a man trying to be a woman. It is your society's problem that you only recognize two sexes.'" Hijra social movements have campaigned for recognition as a third sex, and in 2005, Indian passport application forms were updated with three gender options: M, F, and E (for male, female, and eunuch, respectively). Some Indian languages such as Sanskrit have three gender 'options'— specifically masculine, feminine and neuter forms of nouns.

In November 2009, India agreed to list eunuchs and transgender people as "others", distinct from males and females, in voting rolls and voter identity cards. On April 15, 2014, the Supreme Court of India recognized a third gender that is neither male nor female, and as a class entitled to reservation in education and jobs, stating "Recognition of transgenders as a third gender is not a social or medical issue but a human rights issue." This verdict made India one of the few countries to give this landmark judgment.

In addition to the feminine role of hijras, which is widespread across the subcontinent, a few occurrences of institutionalized "female masculinity" have been noted in modern India. Among the Gaddhi in the foothills of the Himalayas, some girls adopt a role as a sadhin, renouncing marriage, and dressing and working as men, but retaining female names and pronouns. A late-nineteenth century anthropologist noted the existence of a similar role in Madras, that of the basivi. However, historian Walter Penrose concludes that in both cases "their status is perhaps more 'transgendered' than 'third-gendered.'"

In April 2014, Justice KS Radhakrishnan, of Supreme Court of India declared transgender to be the third gender in Indian law, in a case brought by the National Legal Services Authority (Nalsa) against Union of India and others. The ruling said:

Seldom, our society realizes or cares to realize the trauma, agony and pain which the members of Transgender community undergo, nor appreciates the innate feelings of the members of the Transgender community, especially of those whose mind and body disown their biological sex. Our society often ridicules and abuses the Transgender community and in public places like railway stations, bus stands, schools, workplaces, malls, theatres, hospitals, they are sidelined and treated as untouchables, forgetting the fact that the moral failure lies in the society's unwillingness to contain or embrace different gender identities and expressions, a mindset which we have to change.

Justice Radhakrishnan said that transgender people should be treated consistently with other minorities under the law, enabling them to access jobs, healthcare and education. He framed the issue as one of human rights, saying that, "These TGs, even though insignificant in numbers, are still human beings and therefore they have every right to enjoy their human rights", concluding by declaring that:

1. Hijras, Eunuchs, apart from binary gender, be treated as "third gender" for the purpose of safeguarding their rights under Part III of our Constitution and the laws made by the Parliament and the State Legislature.
2. Transgender persons' right to decide their self-identified gender is also upheld and the Centre and State Governments are directed to grant legal recognition of their gender identity such as male, female or as third gender.

==== Japan ====
Non-binary gender is not legally recognized in Japan. Official documents, such as birth certificates and identification cards, require individuals to have binary entries.

A foreign resident holding a foreign passport with "X" in the gender field will have this reflected on their residence card. In this case, the gender field on the residence card will be left blank, with "Gender X" indicated on the back of the card.

==== Nepal ====
On 27 December 2007, the Supreme Court of Nepal issued a decision mandating that the government scrap all laws that discriminated based on sexual orientation and/or gender identity and establish a committee to study same-sex marriage policy. The court also established a third-gender category. Nepalese official documents afford citizens three gender options: male, female, and "others". This may include people who present or perform as a gender that is different from the one that was assigned to them at birth. Nepal's 2011 census was the first national census in the world to allow people to register as a gender other than male or female. However, it was reported that "logistical problems, discrimination on the part of census-takers, and fear among some third genders" were interfering with the process, and eventually the census was published only listing male and female, leaving non-binary people outside or forcing them in a gender that was not their own. The 2007 supreme court decision ordered the government to issue citizenship ID cards that allowed "third-gender" or "other" to be listed. The court also ordered that the only requirements to identify as third-gender would be the person's own self-identification.

"Legal provisions should be made to provide for gender identity to the people of transgender or third gender, under which female third gender, male third gender and intersexual are grouped, as per the concerned person's self-feeling"

More recent material indicates that this third option is not available to intersex persons.

==== Pakistan ====
In Pakistan, the polite term is khwaja sara or "khwaja sira" (Urdu: خواجه سرا), as hijra and khusra are considered derogatory by the khawaja sara community and human rights activists in Pakistan. As most of Pakistan's official government and business documents are in English, the term "third gender" has been chosen to represent individuals (either male or female, neither, and/or both) that identify themselves as, transsexual, transgender person, cross-dresser (zenana in Urdu), transvestite, and eunuchs (narnbans in Urdu).

In June 2009, the Supreme Court of Pakistan ordered a census of khawaja sara, who number between 80,000 and 300,000 in Pakistan. In December 2009, Iftikhar Muhammad Chaudhry, the Chief Justice of Pakistan, ordered that the National Database and Registration Authority issue national identity cards to members of the community showing their distinct gender. "It's the first time in the 62-year history of Pakistan that such steps are being taken for our welfare", Almas Bobby, a khawaja sara association's president, said to Reuters, "It's a major step towards giving us respect and identity in society. We are slowly getting respect in society. Now people recognize that we are also human beings."

The government of Prime Minister Imran Khan has started issuing national identity cards to khawaja Sara (trans) population in Pakistan. This is the first time in countries history, and a major change.

==== Taiwan ====
In January 2018, it was announced that plans to introduce a third gender option on identification documents, such as passports and the National Identification cards, would be implemented in the near future. In November 2018, Chen Mei-ling, the Minister of the National Development Council, announced that these plans come into effect in 2020.

==== Thailand ====
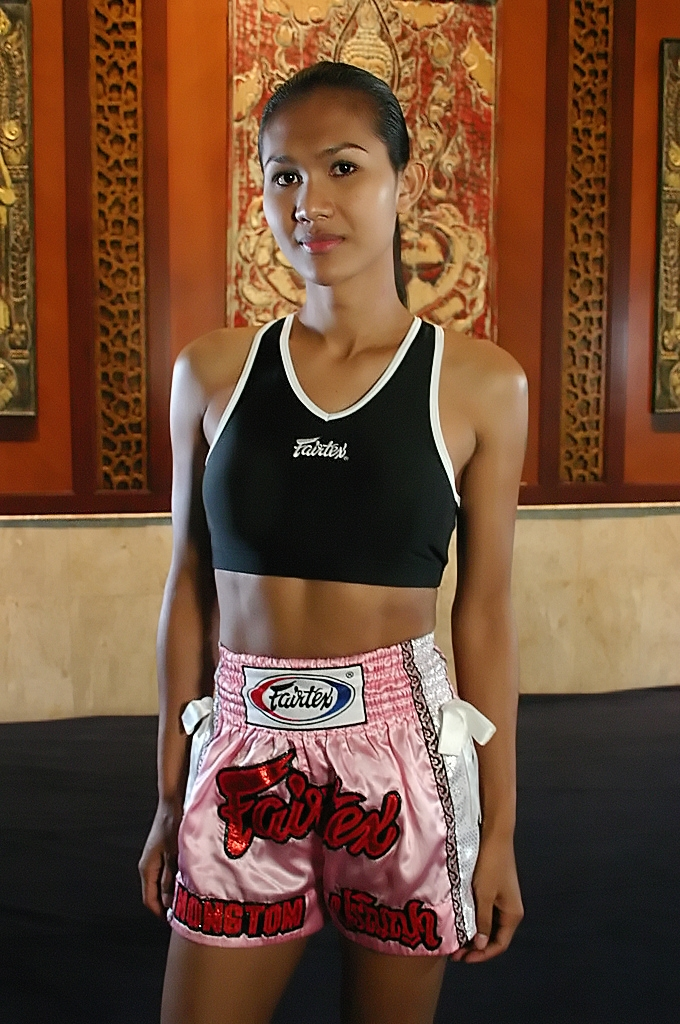
Nong Tum, a transgender Muay Thai boxer

Also commonly referred to as a third sex are the kathoeys (or "ladyboys") of Thailand. These are people whose assigned sex was male who identify and live as female. A significant number of Thais perceive kathoeys as belonging to a third gender, including many kathoeys themselves; others see them as second-category women. Thai persons assigned male at birth undergoing sex-change operations are not uncommon occurrences, but they are still regarded as men on their identification documents. Despite this, Thai society remains one of the world's most tolerant towards kathoeys or the third gender. Researcher Sam Winter writes:

We asked our 190 [kathoeys] to say whether they thought of themselves as men, women, sao praphet song ["a second kind of woman"] or kathoey. None thought of themselves as male, and only 11 percent saw themselves as kathoey (i.e. 'non-male'). By contrast 45 percent thought of themselves as women, with another 36 percent as sao praphet song... Unfortunately we did not include the category phet tee sam (third sex/gender); conceivably if we had done so there may have been many respondents who would have chosen that term... Around 50 percent [of non-transgender Thais] see them as males with the mistaken minds, but the other half see them as either women born into the wrong body (around 15 percent) or as a third sex/gender (35 percent).

In 2004, the Chiang Mai Technology School allocated a separate lavatory for kathoeys, with an intertwined male and female symbol on the door. The 15 kathoey students are required to wear male clothing at school but are allowed to sport feminine hairdos. The restroom features four stalls, but no urinals.

Although Kathoeys are still not fully respected, they are gradually gaining acceptance and have made themselves a very distinct part of the Thai society. This is especially true in the entertainment, business, and fashion industries in Thailand, where the Kathoeys play significant roles in leadership and management positions. In addition, Kathoeys or second-category-women are very sought after when businesses are hiring salespeople. In many job posts, it is common to see companies state that second-category-women are preferred as their sales force because they are generally seen as more charismatic and expressive individuals.

=== Europe ===
Europe map as of March 2026 Non-binary / third gender option available as voluntary opt-in, at least one district Opt-in for foreign-born nationals if recognized in country of origin.

==== Austria ====
On 15 June 2018, the Austrian Constitutional Court reached a decision, published in a news release on 29 June, that Article 8 of the European Convention on Human Rights guarantees recognition of gender identity beyond the binary male or female, and that people with a variation in gender development other than male or female must be allowed to leave a gender entry empty and must be allowed to have a positive other entry implemented. They also found that current law is not in contradiction to these requirements, and can be interpreted in a way that is conformant to the constitutional right of recognition of gender identity via Article 8 of the ECHR. The Court ruled that the national interests listed in Article 8.1 ECHR do not outweigh the very sensible interest of an individual to recognition of their personal life, including gender identity, and that other laws can be adapted if needed. The Court indicate that administrative bodies may require proof of the adequacy of a change to an entry and the relation to a person's actual social life, and that Article 8.1 ECHR does not establish a right to arbitrarily named entries. They have not decided on a specific name a third gender option should have, but cite recommendations as "divers", "inter", "offen".

Alex Jürgen, an intersex activist, fought for their right to have a non-binary option in their passport and was the first person in Austria to receive it.

Options besides male and female are only available for intersex people, who are required to provide medical records to prove their sex.

Each year at least 35 children in Austria are reported to be born with ambiguous sex characteristics. Surgical interventions on intersex children, to make them fit one of the binary sex characteristics, are criticized by Verein Intergeschlechtliche Menschen Österreich (VIMÖ), an Austrian association fighting for the rights of intersex people. They demand that children should be free to decide on these matters when they are grown up. Johannes Wahala, president of the Austrian Society For Sexologies and head of Beratungsstelle Courage advice center in Graz condemns these operations and wishes for the introduction of a third gender.

On December 18, 2025, the Austrian Constitutional Court ruled that Article 8 of the European Convention of Human Rights prevents the civil registry office from restricting their register to only male and female identities. The court found that the subject's self-identification was the principle guiding requests to alter or remove male and female markers, thus striking down the administrative practice of requiring medical proof.

==== Belgium ====
In June 2019, the Constitutional Court of Belgium struck down certain parts of the country's 2017 transgender law. The proceedings against the law were initiated by LGBT rights organizations, who argued that the law still discriminated against people with a non-binary or genderfluid identity, because it still only allowed people to register as either "male" or "female". The Constitutional Court agreed with the action brought against the law, and found the contested provisions to be discriminatory and therefore unconstitutional. Though the Court suggested a few ways in which to remedy the unconstitutional aspects, such as "the creation of one or more additional categories" or "the possibility to remove the registration of sex or gender as an element of a person's civil status", it also stressed that the responsibility to remediate the law's shortcomings remained with the legislature.

The De Croo Government, Belgium's federal government which took office in October 2020, announced plans to introduce the possibility to register under the gender identifier "X", in order to address the judgment of the Constitutional Court. This was expressed by the new minister of Justice in the De Croo Government, Vincent Van Quickenborne, in November 2020. This proposition was rejected in favor of erasing any mention of gender on identity cards (which appeared in 2003), while the National Registry will still mention the assigned gender at birth. The law will be effective in 2022.

==== Denmark ====
According to comment by Transgender Europe, Danish citizens (including Greenlandic- and Faroese nationals) have been issued passport with option 'X' upon application, without medical requirements. However, it follows from the Danish Passport Regulations Retsinformation that persons with even personal identification numbers receive the gender marker "F" and persons with odd personal identification numbers the gender marker "M" (§ 4(4)), with the only exception that persons who have not (yet) had an official gender change but to whom the National Hospital's Sexological Clinic has certified that they are transsexual can obtain the gender marker "X" (§ 4(5)). Accordingly, legal gender remains binary in Denmark (including Greenland and the Faroe Islands) and only transsexual people without a legal gender change can obtain an X marker in their passport.

==== Germany ====
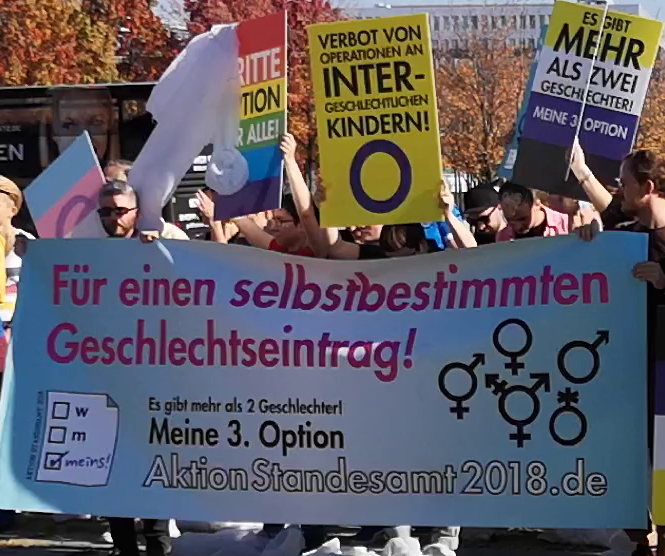
October 13, 2018: Protest in support of third gender in front of the Bundeskanzleramt

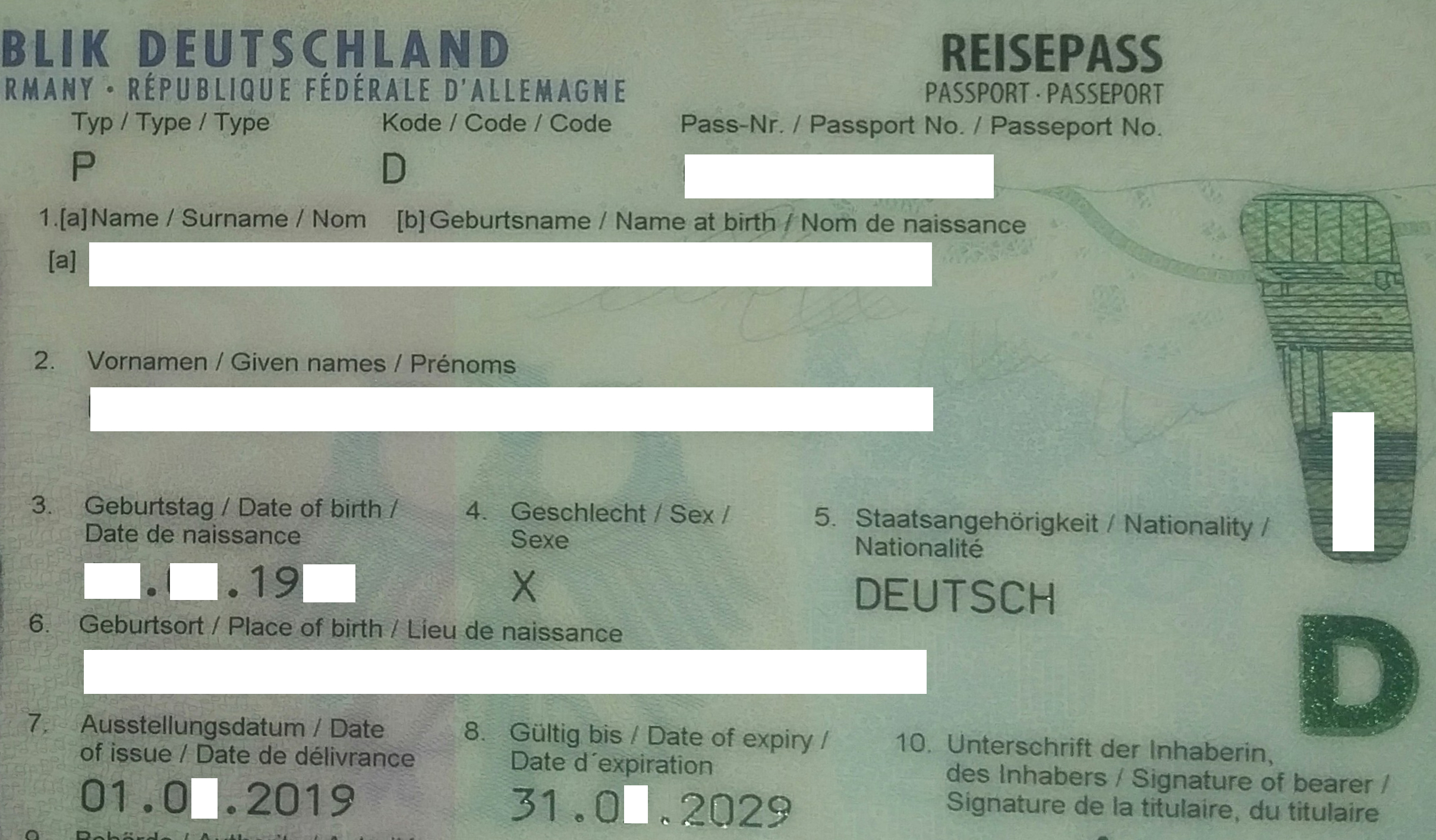
Passport with gender marker "X"

Germany is thought to be the first European country that recognizes "indeterminate" sex on birth certificates, which is represented by the absence of any gender marker, from November 2013. A report by the German Ethics Council stated that the law was passed because "Many people who were subjected to a 'normalizing' operation in their childhood have later felt it to have been a mutilation and would never have agreed to it as adults." Deutsche Welle reported that an "indeterminate" 'option' was made available for the birth certificates of intersex infants with ambiguous genitalia on 1 November 2013. The move is controversial with many intersex advocates in Germany and elsewhere suggesting that it might encourage surgical interventions, or simply fails to address the key health concerns of intersex people. On 21 January 2015, the Celle Court of Appeals confirmed in a judgment that intersex people cannot obtain a gender marker other than "female" or "male" in their birth certificate, but only the absence of any such marker. The court held at the same time that even an adult intersex person who was registered with a gender marker at birth can obtain the deletion of that gender marker. This judgment was sent for review by the Federal Court of Justice.

On 8 November 2017, the Federal Constitutional Court released a press statement about its ruling from 10 October 2017, which is in favour of a positive third gender option instead of no entry. On 15 August 2018, the German government approved a draft law allowing a third gender option on birth certificates for babies who are not distinctly male or female. On 22 December 2018, the adopted third gender law entered into force, allowing the choice for intersex people (both at birth and at a later age) between "female", "male", "diverse" and no gender marker at all. In case of a change later in life, first names can also be changed. To change the marker and/or names according to this law, a doctor's note is required, but it is not specified what kind of "variance of gender development" is required for the law. As such, non-intersex non-binary people have made use of this law to change their markers and names as personally trusted doctors approve and give out such a required note nevertheless. In the meantime, an appeals court had held that a nonbinary status must also be open to non-intersex non-binary people; the adopted act does not address this category of people and their situation therefore first remained unclear pending additional case-law. On 22 April 2020, the Federal Court of Justice ruled that in order to obtain nonbinary status, these persons must follow the procedure set out in the legislation on transsexuality which applies by analogy, after which they can also choose between "diverse" and no gender marker at all.

On April 12, 2024, the Bundestag passed the Self-Determination Act (German: Gesetz über die Selbstbestimmung in Bezug auf den Geschlechtseintrag (SBGG)). The law allows all German citizens to change both their gender record/marker and first names through a declaration to the registry office. Aside from binary markers "Male" and "Female", the entry "diverse" may be chosen. Alternatively the gender entry may be removed entirely. Both "diverse", as well as no entry, are represented by the letter 'X' on passports. Notably, any citizen may make this declarion to the registry office without any further medical/legal requirements after giving 3 month prior notice. On November 1, 2024, The Self-Determination Act came into force, repealing the Transsexual Law (TSG) and amending the Third Gender Law to allow the legal recognition of non-intersex non-binary people as "diverse". Persons aged 14 to 18 years can change their gender on government documents in the presence of their parents. If the parents do not approve a change, the child can go in front of a family court. For individuals under the age of 14, parental guardians are authorized to modify their child's gender designation. This requires the child's consent from the age of 5 onwards.

On 18 November 2025 the Oberlandesgericht Frankfurt ruled, that is acceptable for a non-binary person to be addressed as "Herr" (Mister) in letters send by the administration. The plaintiff had claimed it was unacceptable to be addressed as "Herr" or "Frau". The court concluded, that an address was merely a polite phrase, not meant to resolve any legal issue. The decision can not be appealed.

==== Iceland ====
In June 2019, the Icelandic Parliament voted 45–0 on a bill to implement a progressive "self-determination gender change model law", similar to numerous European and South American countries. The bill includes a third gender option known as "X" on official documents. The law went into effect on 1 January 2020.

==== Malta ====
Malta was the first European country to offer an 'X' on ID cards and passports of non-binary people. This law was introduced in September 2017. In July 2024, legislation was officially passed by the Parliament of Malta to implement a non-binary option alongside male and female on an individual’s birth certificate and went into effect in September 2024. Previously, a birth certificate could only list male or female within Malta.

==== The Netherlands ====
In May 2018, Leonne Zeegers was the first Dutch citizen to receive the "X" marked gender on the passport instead of "male" or "female". Leonne, then 57, was born intersex and raised male, before having gender reassignment surgery and become female, but still identifies as an intersex person. Leonne won a court case which meant that preventing someone from registering officially as gender neutral is a "violation of private life, self-determination and personal autonomy". It will, however, still be the decision of the court on whether the "X" will be issued on anyone's passport in the future. The ruling opened doors for Dutch LGBT groups to ask the government for anyone to be able to identify as gender neutral in the future.

==== Spain ====
In May 2023, Andrea Speck, a German-born resident of Seville, won a court case in which the High Court of Justice of Andalusia, Ceuta and Melilla ordered the Ministry of the Interior to recognize them as nonbinary in the Central Registry of Foreign Nationals. In January 2024, the Directorate-General for Migration Management, an office under the Secretary of State for Migration, amended official forms and documentation, including NIE numbers, to allow for a nonbinary gender option for foreign-born nationals whose nonbinary gender is legally recognized by their country of origin. In April 2025, a bill to legalize a nonbinary gender in the Civil Registry and ban non-consensual medical interventions on the bodies of intersex people was filed in the Cortes Generales by Sumar.

==== United Kingdom ====
The title "Mx." is widely accepted in the United Kingdom by government organisations and businesses as an alternative for non-binary people while the HESA allows the use of non-binary gender markers for students in higher education. In 2015 early day motion EDM660 was registered with Parliament. EDM660 calls for citizens to be permitted access to the X marker on passports. When the text of EDM660 came to light in 2016 a formal petition was launched through the Parliamentary Petitions Service calling for EDM660 to be passed into law.

In September 2015 the Ministry of Justice responded to a petition calling for self-determination of legal gender, saying that they were not aware of "any specific detriment" experienced by nonbinary people unable to have their genders legally recognised. In January 2016 the Trans Inquiry Report by the Women and Equalities Committee called for nonbinary people to be protected from discrimination under the Equality Act, for the X gender marker to be added to passports, and for a wholesale review into the needs of nonbinary people by the government within six months. This did not happen. In June 2018 the British High Court ruled against a bid for passports to have an X marker.

The Scottish Government undertook a public consultation on Reforms to the Gender Recognition Act 2004 (GRA) from 9 November 2017 to 1 March 2018. The 2004 GRA sets out the legal process by which someone can change their legally recognised gender. The consultation analysis explains that 60% of those answering the question, agreed with the proposal to introduce a self-declaratory system for legal gender recognition. Point 66 in the analysis document reads "A majority of respondents, 62% of those answering the question, thought that Scotland should take action to recognise non-binary people. Of the remaining respondents, 33% did not think Scotland should take action and 4% did not know." A draft bill for reforming the 2004 GRA is to be proposed by the end of 2019. However, in their factsheet, the Scottish Government say they will not be extending legal gender-recognition to non-binary people. Instead they are intending to set up working group to consider what more could be done to further the inclusion of non-binary people in society.

In March 2020, a judge ruled that the lack of nonbinary gender marker on UK-issued passports was lawful "for now", but noted that "if the international trend towards more widespread official recognition of "non-binary" identity continues, then at some future date, denial could constitute a breach of human rights."

On 14 July 2020, International Nonbinary Day, MP Christine Jardine brought a private member's bill backed by LGBT charity Stonewall UK to the House of Commons, calling for the option of an X gender marker on UK-issued passports for nonbinary people. Its second reading was due to take place in January 2021, however the bill failed to complete its passage through that parliamentary session and will therefore make no further progress.

On 14 September 2020 an employment tribunal ruled that a non-binary employee was protected under the gender reassignment characteristic of the Equality Act 2010, the first legal confirmation that non-binary people are protected by the Act.

In May 2021, the UK government rejected a petition calling for the legal recognition of non-binary as a gender identity. Over 130,000 people signed the petition, which stated allowing non-binary as a gender identity would ease gender dysphoria and protect non-binary people from transphobic hate crimes. Despite 58% of respondents agreeing that a non-binary identity should be recognised in a 2018 consultation on the GRA, the government stated in their response that there were no plans to extend the GRA, saying that to do so would have "complex practical consequences".

In December 2021, the Supreme Court of the United Kingdom issued judgment in the case of R (Christie Elan-Cane) v Secretary of State for the Home Department ruling against recognition of non-binary gender. The court's judgment ruled that the European Convention on Human Rights did not require states to issue an "X" option for passports and that there was "no legislation in the United Kingdom which recognises a non-gendered category of individuals." The appellant, Elan-Cane, pledged to appeal the ruling to the European Court of Human Rights.

In January 2024, judges at the High Court in London ruled that, "We have decided that whenever the Gender Recognition Act refers to ‘gender’ it refers to a binary concept – that is, to male, or to female gender. The GRP [Gender Recognition Panel] accordingly, had and has no power to issue a gender recognition certificate to the claimant which says that they are ‘non-binary’."

=== Oceania ===
==== Australia ====
First reported in January 2003, Australians can choose "X" as their gender or sex. Alex MacFarlane is believed to be the first person in Australia to obtain a birth certificate recording sex as indeterminate, and the first Australian passport with an 'X' sex marker in 2003. This was stated by the West Australian newspaper to be on the basis of a challenge by MacFarlane, using an indeterminate birth certificate issued by the State of Victoria. Other individuals known to have similar early options include Tony Briffa of Organisation Intersex International Australia and former mayor of City of Hobsons Bay, Victoria, previously acknowledged as the world's first openly intersex public official and mayor.

Government policy between 2003 and 2011 was to issue passports with an 'X' marker to persons who could "present a birth certificate that notes their sex as indeterminate". In 2011, the Australian Passport Office introduced new guidelines for issuing of passports with a new gender, and broadened availability of an X descriptor to all individuals with documented "indeterminate" sex. The revised policy stated that "sex reassignment surgery is not a prerequisite to issue a passport in a new gender. Birth or citizenship certificates do not need to be amended."

Australian Commonwealth guidelines on the recognition of sex and gender, published in June 2013, extended the use of an 'X' gender marker to any adult who chooses that option, in all dealings with the Commonwealth government and its agencies. The option is being introduced over a three-year period. The guidelines also clarify that the federal government collects data on gender, rather than sex. In March 2014, the Australian Capital Territory introduced an 'X' classification for birth certificates.

Norrie May-Welby is popularly – but erroneously – often regarded as the first person in the world to obtain officially indeterminate, unspecified or "genderless" status. May-Welby became the first transgender person in Australia to pursue a legal status of neither a man nor a woman, in 2010. In April 2014, the High Court of Australia ruled that NSW Registry of Births, Deaths and Marriages must record in the register that the sex of May-Welby is "non-specific". The Court found that sex affirmation "surgery did not resolve her [sic] sexual ambiguity".

An alliance of organizations including the National LGBTI Health Alliance, Organisation Intersex International Australia and Transgender Victoria has called for X to be redefined as non-binary.

In March 2017, an Australian and Aotearoa/New Zealand community statement called for an end to legal classification of sex, stating that legal third classifications, like binary classifications, were based on structural violence and failed to respect diversity and a "right to self-determination".

In April 2019, Tasmania became the first state or territory in Australia to make sex or gender identifiers in birth certificates optional and providing for official definitions for 'sex' and 'gender' (only 'sex' was defined before the reforms). The reform was legislated by a non-government coalition of MPs and adopted an 'opt-in' model for sex identification on birth certificates. However, a binary classification of sex (male or female, with no intersex/unspecified option) is still collected for medical purposes. Children born with ambiguous genitalia are given an additional 60 days to choose a sex for registration. The child's sex will be displayed on the birth certificate only if the parents choose to opt-in. The same reforms also allowed persons over the age of 16 to change their gender identity on official documentation – without a sex reassignment surgery or hormone replacement therapy – by providing a gender declaration.

==== New Zealand ====
Birth certificates are available at birth showing "indeterminate" sex if it is not possible to assign a sex. The New Zealand Department of Internal Affairs states, "A person's sex can be recorded as indeterminate at the time of birth if it cannot be ascertained that the person is either male or female, and there are a number of people so recorded."

Passports are available from December 2012 with an 'X' sex descriptor, where "X" means "indeterminate/unspecified". These were originally introduced for people transitioning gender.

On 17 July 2015, Statistics New Zealand introduced the first version of a gender identity classification standard for statistical purposes. The current version of the standard was introduced in April 2021 with the option of three categories (male, female, or another gender) or five categories (cisgender male, cisgender female, transgender male, transgender female, or another gender).

In March 2017, an Aotearoa/New Zealand and Australian community statement called for an end to legal classification of sex, stating that legal third classifications, like binary classifications, were based on structural violence and failed to respect diversity and a "right to self-determination".

=== North America ===
==== Canada ====
As of 2021, Canada distinguishes between sex and gender on the federal level. On August 31, 2017, the federal government of Canada became one of the first countries to allow citizens to choose between "F," "M," and "X," options on birth certificates and passports.

Since 2017, Ontario drivers have the option to display "X" as a gender identifier on their driver's licenses, or to not have any indicator on provincial identification. Ontario health cards do not carry a gender or sex marker, though a binary gender is still tracked for use in medical appointments.

In April 2017, a baby born in British Columbia, Searyl Atli Doty, became the first in the world known to be issued a health card with a gender-neutral "U" sex marker. The parent, Kori Doty, who is non-binary transgender, wanted to give the child the opportunity to discover their own gender identity. The province has refused to issue a birth certificate to the child without specifying a gender; Doty has filed a legal challenge. Doty and seven other transgender and intersex people have filed a human rights complaint against the province, alleging that publishing gender markers on birth certificates is discriminatory.

In July 2017, the Northwest Territories began offering "X" as a non-binary option on birth certificates.

In July 2019, Nova Scotia began offering citizens the option to choose "X" as a sex indicator, or the option to not have any indicator on provincial identification.

==== United States ====
Jurisdictions that legally recognize a non-binary gender on state documents (January 2025) Recognition via statute or policy Recognition via court order only, isolated instances No legal recognition

A number of U.S. jurisdictions allow nonbinary gender markers on state identification documents, including birth certificates and driver's licenses.

From 2022 through January 20, 2025, an X option was also available on passports. At the beginning of the second Trump administration, federal documents no longer offered a nonbinary marker, and passport applications requesting the marker had been suspended, but previously issued passports using the gender marker "X" were stated to remain valid until their expiration date.

In June 2025, Massachusetts District Judge Julia Kobick ruled in Orr v. Trump, in an expanded preliminary injunction, that the State Department must issue passports that matches one's gender identity, including "X"-gender designators and including those who had previously been issued a passport matching their assigned sex at birth. Later that year in November, the Supreme Court stayed the injunction until litigation concluded. As of June 2026, litigation is ongoing, meaning the State Department is again only issuing passports matching sex assigned at birth.

===== Federal =====
On Intersex Awareness Day, October 26, 2015, LGBT civil rights organization Lambda Legal filed a federal discrimination lawsuit against the United States Department of State for denying navy veteran Dana Zzyym, associate director of Intersex Campaign for Equality, a passport because they are, and identify as, neither male nor female, but intersex. On November 22, 2016, the District Court for the District of Colorado ruled in favor of Zzyym, stating that the State Department violated federal law. The ruling stated that the court found "no evidence that the Department followed a rational decision-making process in deciding to implement its binary-only gender passport policy," and ordered the U.S. Passport Agency to reconsider its earlier decision. On September 19, 2018, a federal judge ruled a second time in favor of Zzyym, deciding that the U.S. State Department refusal to give a passport exceeded its authority.

On February 25, 2020, Rep. Ro Khanna introduced legislation in the United States House of Representatives (H. R. 5962) that would add a third gender designation to U.S. passport applications. On June 30, 2021, the State Department announced that they had begun an effort to add a third gender marker on U.S. passports. On October 27, 2021, the very first US X passport was issued to Dana Zzyym. As stated by Lambda Legal, Zzyym's legal representatives in their lawsuit, the X is a "sex/gender" marker, issued to Zzyym because they were able to demonstrate to the courts that they are not male or female in sex, but intersex, and also representing that Zzyym is non-binary in their gender identity.

From April 11, 2022, to the end of the Biden administration, the "X" gender marker was available in passports for all U.S. citizens. No medical documentation was required for the issuance of a passport with an "X" marker and the gender on the applicant's identity documents was not required to match the requested passport gender.

On January 20, 2025, after his inauguration, President Donald Trump signed an executive order instructing the federal government to recognize "only two genders, male and female," including on federal identity documents. On January 23, 2025, secretary of state Marco Rubio instructed staff to suspend all applications for passports that requested an "X" sex marker or a change to the existing sex marker.

In June 2025, a judge's ruling in Orr v. Trump issued a preliminary injunction for the State Department to begin issuing passports with a requested "X" sex marker. The injunction was stayed by the Supreme Court in November that year. As of June 2026, litigation is still ongoing, with the State Department not issuing "X" passports.

===== By state and territory =====
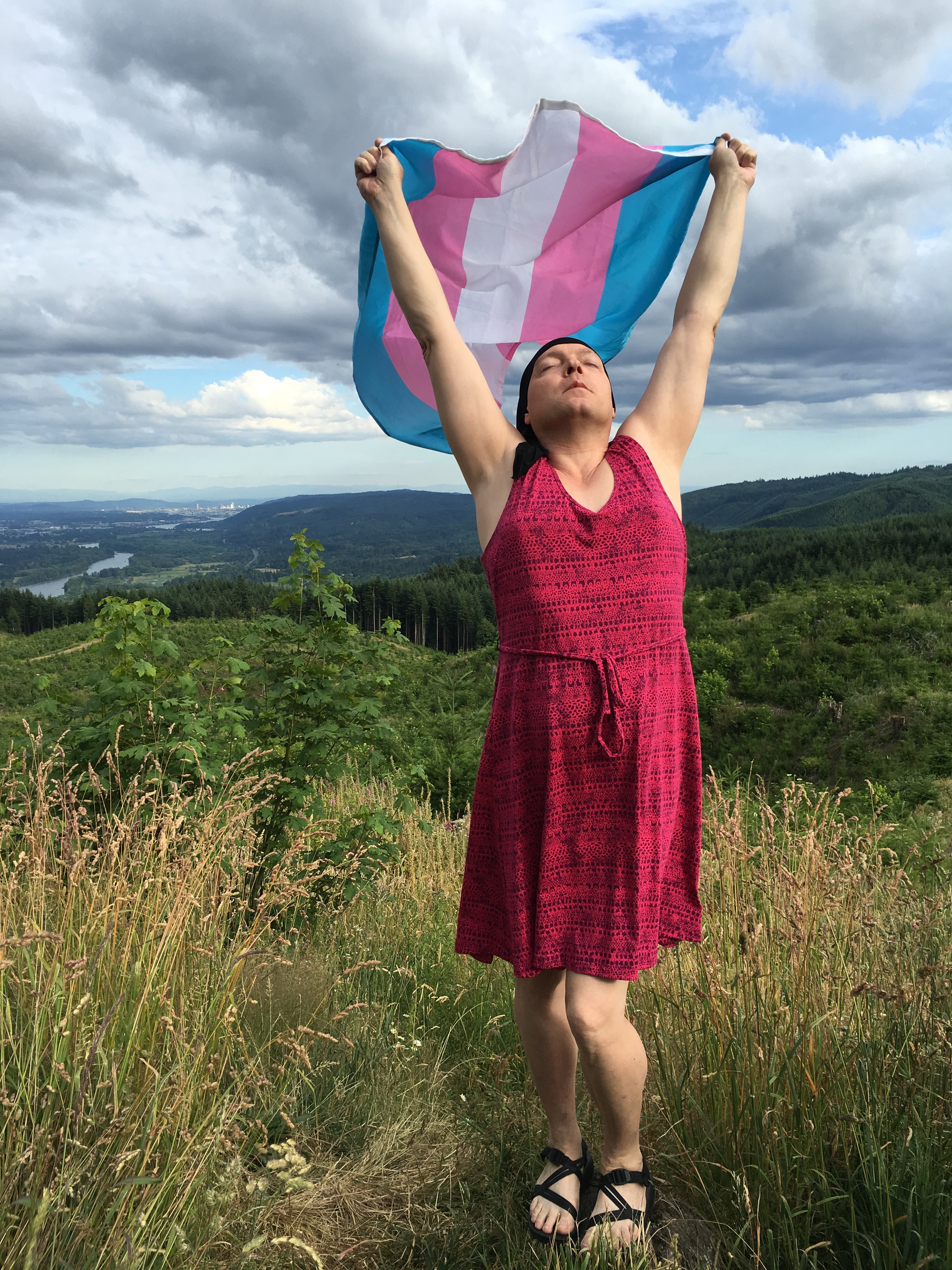
In late 2016, Elisa Rae Shupe (Oregon) became the first person to receive legal recognition of a non-binary gender in the United States after a state court ruling.

Obverse of a generic New Mexico driver identification card showing the 'X' gender designator

Third gender option on state documents, by U.S. state and territory
State/District	Recognized?	First issued or available	End date	Driver's License/ID	Birth certificate	Requirements	Notes
Alabama	No	—N/a	—N/a	No	No	—N/a	
Alaska	No	—N/a	—N/a	No	No	—N/a	
American Samoa	No	—N/a	—N/a	No	No	—N/a	
Arizona	No	—N/a	—N/a	No	No	—N/a	
Arkansas	No	c. 2010	2024	No; Available 2010–2024	No	—N/a	Arkansas had historically operated without a clear public policy for changing gender markers on IDs. In December 2010, former Assistant Commissioner of Operations and Administration Mike Munns announced that Arkansas's official policy would be to "allow a licensee to change their gender as requested, no questions asked, no documentation required." In March 2024, Governor Sarah Huckabee Sanders reversed the policy, declaring through an "emergency rule" that the state no longer permit non-binary (X) gender markers on driver's licenses or state identification cards.
California	Yes	2016	—N/a	Yes	Yes	None (opt-in)	First Californian to change her legal gender to nonbinary was Sara Kelly Keenan, who is intersex and nonbinary. She changed her license in September 2016 and her birth certificate in December 2016. In September 2017, California passed legislation formally implementing a non-binary gender marker on birth certificates, driver's licenses, and state ID without requiring a physician's statement or court hearing, effective January 1, 2019. As of 2021, 8,855 people had California driver's licenses with a non-binary gender designation. By November 2022, the number had increased to 15,904 residents, with 10,340 of the total being aged 16 to 29, and more than 14,000 of the total being aged under 40; only seven were aged over 80.
Colorado	Yes	2018	—N/a	Yes	Yes	None (opt-in)	Applicants who want to use the X on their driver's licenses complete a form during the license application process and are not required to be undergoing any hormonal treatment or surgeries.
Connecticut	Yes	2020	—N/a	Yes	Yes	License/ID: None (opt-in) Birth certificate: Any medical transition, doctor's letter	On January 27, 2020, Governor Ned Lamont announced that Connecticut residents could select "X" as a gender on licenses and ID cards. By 2023, Connecticut had issued at least 521 driver's licenses with an X gender marker. Motor Vehicle Department employees shall not request additional gender-related information beyond that required on the applicable forms or otherwise inquire about the applicant's private medical history or records.
Delaware	Yes	2022	—N/a	Yes	No	None (opt-in); Driver's license only	An opt-in form allows an X marker on licenses and IDs, but there is no "X" marker for birth certificates.
District of Columbia	Yes	2017	—N/a	Yes	Yes	License/ID: None (opt-in) Birth certificate: Any medical transition, doctor's letter	No medical certification required for ID change. The D.C. policy change went into effect on June 27, 2017, making the district the first place in the U.S. to offer gender-neutral driver's licenses and ID cards. Birth certificates can read "Male," "Female," or "Unknown," and require a doctor's affidavit of treatment. Surgery is not required.
Florida	No	—N/a	—N/a	No	No	—N/a	
Georgia	No	—N/a	—N/a	No	No	—N/a	
Guam	No	—N/a	—N/a	No	No	—N/a	
Hawaii	Yes	2020	—N/a	Yes	No		Effective July 1, 2020 for state issued IDs.
Idaho	No	—N/a	—N/a	No	No	—N/a	
Illinois	Yes	2024	—N/a	Yes	Yes		Law for state ID cards passed in August 2019, active in April 2024.
Indiana	No	2019	2024	No	No	—N/a	In March 2019, the Indiana Bureau of Motor Vehicles began allowing gender-neutral markers on driver's licenses and identification cards. In April 2024, this decision was rescinded by an appeals court, ruling Indiana is no longer required to offer the 'X' option.
Iowa	No	—N/a	—N/a	No; Available 2019–2024	No	—N/a	
Kansas	No	—N/a	—N/a	No	No	—N/a	
Kentucky	No	—N/a	—N/a	No	No	—N/a	
Louisiana	No	—N/a	—N/a	No	No	—N/a	
Maine	Yes	2018	—N/a	Yes	Yes		On June 11, 2018, Maine began allowing "X" gender markers on state IDs, using a temporary sticker until a 2019 system update.
Maryland	Yes	2019	—N/a	Yes	No		A law offering an "X" gender marker on driver's licenses and state identification cards went into effect October 1, 2019.
Massachusetts	Yes	2019	—N/a	Yes	Yes		Effective November 12, 2019 for drivers licenses/state IDs and in July 2024 for birth certificates.
Michigan	Yes	2021	—N/a	Yes	Yes		Effective November 10, 2021.
Minnesota	Yes	2018	—N/a	Yes	No	None (opt-in)	Minnesota began allowing "X" gender markers on state IDs on October 1, 2018. The designation is considered self reported information and does not require documentation. A nonbinary person named MJ Zappa became the first to obtain the marker after a struggle with the state Department of Vehicle Services for over a year.
Mississippi	No	—N/a	—N/a	No	No	—N/a	
Missouri	No	—N/a	—N/a	No	No	—N/a	
Montana	No	—N/a	—N/a	No	No	—N/a	
Nebraska	No	—N/a	—N/a	No	No	—N/a	
Nevada	Yes	2019	—N/a	Yes	Yes		Nevada has allowed "X" gender markers on state IDs since 2019.
New Hampshire	Yes	2019	—N/a	Yes	No		In July 2019, the New Hampshire legislature passed a bill allowing individuals to indicate their sex on IDs as male, female, or other.
New Jersey	Yes	2019	—N/a	Yes	Yes		The passage of Assembly Bill A1718 amended state law to allow the State Registrar, effective February 1, 2019, to issue an amended birth certificate with a third designation of "Undesignated/non-binary" to a person upon request. In 2021, New Jersey added an 'X' gender identifier option to be displayed on drivers' licenses instead of 'F' or 'M'.
New Mexico	Yes	2020	—N/a	Yes	Yes	Doctor's signature on form	The passage of Senate Bill 20 into law in the 2019 session of the New Mexico Legislature amended the Vital Records Act to allow for a third designator on the state's identification documents (in both Real ID Act compliant and non-compliant forms), 'X', to be selected instead of 'F' or 'M' and required only a doctor's signature on the designator change request form instead of a court order as prior. The Motor Vehicle Division of the New Mexico Taxation and Revenue Department began issuing such licenses later that year, although by Q1 2020 the forms for license renewal had not yet been reprinted with the third option shown, instead allowing manual amendment.
New York	Yes	2021	—N/a	Yes	Yes	License/ID: None (opt-in) Birth certificate: Notarized affidavit	New York City and New York State have separate departments handling birth certificates. In April 2017, the second intersex birth certificate (in which the recipient's "sex" is listed as intersex) in the United States was issued to non-binary intersex writer and activist Hida Viloria in New York City. As of September 2018, no documentation or surgery is needed to change a gender marker on NYC birth certificates, and birth certificates may be amended to use an "X" gender marker. As of January 2023, New York State birth certificates may be corrected to show an "X" gender designation. Parents may do this on behalf of a child under 16. The only documentation needed is a notarized affidavit. In June 2017, legislation was introduced in New York City to offer an "X" gender marker for residents' ID cards. The IDNYC municipal identification card may be issued with male, female, or "X" gender markers, or with the gender marker left blank; no documentation is needed for initial or updated gender markers. On June 24, 2021, the Gender Recognition Act was signed into law, allowing New Yorkers to display an "X" gender marker on their ID, and IDs with the "X" marker were officially available as of May 27, 2022.
North Carolina	No	—N/a	—N/a	No	No	—N/a	
North Dakota	No	—N/a	—N/a	No	No	—N/a	
Northern Mariana Islands	No	—N/a	—N/a	No	No	—N/a	
Ohio	Yes	2012	—N/a	No	Yes	Court order, intersex only	In 2012, an intersex person successfully petitioned to have their Ohio birth certificate revised to list "hermaphrodite" as their sex. This is the only known instance of a gender listed besides "male" or female". "Male" and "female" remain the only options available on state-issued IDs.
Oklahoma	No	2021	2022	No	No; Available 2021–2022	—N/a	For a short period between the Oklahoma State Department of Health settling Loreleid v. Oklahoma State Department of Health in October 2021 and Oklahoma governor Kevin Stitt signing Executive Order 2021–24 on 8 November 2021, birth certificates with a non-binary gender marker could be issued in Oklahoma. A ban on non-binary gender markers on birth certificates was passed by the state legislature in the form of Oklahoma Senate Bill 1100 in April 2022.
Oregon	Yes	2016	—N/a	Yes	Yes	None (opt-in)	On June 10, 2016, a state judge in a Multnomah County, Oregon, circuit court ruled that a resident, Elisa Rae Shupe, could obtain a non-binary gender designation. Shupe was represented by civil rights lawyer Lake Perriguey. The Transgender Law Center believes this to be "the first ruling of its kind in the U.S." Oregon also allows a person to amend their birth certificate to include non-binary "X" gender marker as of January 1, 2018. On June 15, 2017, Oregon became the first state in the U.S. to announce it would allow a non-binary "X" gender marker on state IDs and driver's licenses. With this change, the state removed the requirement for documentation or medical transition: any person can choose any gender marker ("F", "X", or "M") via self-attestation only.
Pennsylvania	Yes	2020	—N/a	Yes	No		On July 30, 2019, the Pennsylvania Department of Transportation announced that they would introduce an official process to request an X gender designation on state driver's licenses in 2020. According to the Pennsylvania Department of Transportation website, the new process was rolled out in January 2020.
Puerto Rico	Yes	—N/a	—N/a	?	Yes	—N/a	Territorial supreme court ordered the government to issue birth certificates with an "X" gender marker on June 2, 2025.
Rhode Island	Yes	2020	—N/a	Yes	Yes	None (opt-in)	Rhode Island has had an "X" gender marker since June 2020.
South Carolina	No	—N/a	—N/a	No	No	—N/a	
South Dakota	No	—N/a	—N/a	No	No	—N/a	
Tennessee	No	—N/a	—N/a	No	No	—N/a	
Texas	No	—N/a	—N/a	No	No	—N/a	
U.S. Virgin Islands	No	—N/a	—N/a	No	No	—N/a	
Utah	Yes	2017	—N/a	Yes	Yes	Court order required for both documents	Birth certificates in 2017, ID and driver's licenses in 2018. Court order requires evidence of a medical transition or of an intersex condition. Evidence for medical transition requires both a letter/affidavit from a mental health provider and one from a medical provider. The process was made more accessible via a 2021 supreme court case and the documentation requirements were codified in 2023.
Vermont	Yes	2019	—N/a	Yes	Yes	None (opt-in)	Vermont has allowed X gender markers on birth certificates, licenses and State IDs since at least 2019. Since 2023, parents are able to opt for the X marker on initial birth certificates at birth.
Virginia	Yes		—N/a	Yes	No		Virginia has a non-binary option for drivers licenses and state issued ID cards.
Washington	Yes	2018	—N/a	Yes	Yes		In December 2017, Washington state filed an adopted rule to allow a third, non-binary "X" gender marker on amended birth certificates, although certificates will still be initially issued with male or female designations; the rule went into effect on January 27, 2018. The Washington Department of Licensing began offering "Sex: X" driver's licenses and state ID cards on November 13, 2019.
West Virginia	No	—N/a	—N/a	No	No	—N/a	
Wisconsin	No	—N/a	—N/a	No	No	—N/a	
Wyoming	No	—N/a	—N/a	No	No	—N/a	
Source (for states not otherwise referenced): University of Vermont (2023)

=== South America ===
==== Argentina ====
In 2012 and under then president Cristina Fernández de Kirchner, Argentina passed its Gender Identity Law (Spanish: Ley de identidad de género), which allows transgender people to identify with their chosen gender on official documents without first having to receive hormone therapy, gender reassignment surgery or psychiatric counseling. As such, transgender rights in Argentina have been lauded by many as some of the world's most progressive.

In November 2018, two non-binary people from Mendoza Province became the first to obtain an ID and birth certificate without indication of sex. In early 2019, trans activist Lara María Bertolini was allowed to change their official sex to the transfeminine non-binary label "travesti femininity" (Spanish: femeninidad travesti) through a judicial ruling that was considered a landmark for the travesti movement. Judge Myriam Cataldi ruled that the Gender Identity Law applied to Bertolini's case, citing the law's definition of "gender identity" as: "the internal and individual experience of gender as each person feels it, which may or may not correspond to the sex assigned at birth, including the personal experience of the body."

On 20 July 2021, President Alberto Fernández signed a decree (Decreto 476/2021) mandating the National Registry of Persons (RENAPER) to allow a third gender option on all national identity cards and passports, marked as an "X". The measure applies to non-citizen permanent residents who possess Argentine identity cards as well. In compliance with the 2012 Gender Identity Law, this made Argentina the first country in South America to legally recognize non-binary gender on all official documentation, freely and upon the person's request.

The far right administration that came to power in 2023 is planning to withdraw this recognition in 2024.

==== Brazil ====
Federative units that legally recognize a non-binary gender (July 2025) Recognized by provision Recognition through judicial action No legal recognition

There is no recognition of a third gender option nationwide, but since 2020 non-binary and intersex people have been getting court authorizations to register their sex as "unspecified", "non-identified", "intersex", or "non-binary" in the civil registry.

For the purpose of filling out and printing the Identity Card, the gender field must follow the ICAO standardization, with 1 character, M, F or X (for non-binary people). Since January 11, 2024, issuing bodies in the States and the Federal District have been obliged to adopt these Identity Card standards established by the Federal Government. The information in the gender field can be self-determined and self-declared by the person when filling in the data, at the Identification Institutes. In the current context, of the 3,502,816 IDs issued, there are 192 National Identity Cards, that is, 0.0005% defined in the gender field as "X".

While requesting a new passport, Brazilians are able to select an unspecified sex. According to the Federal Police, the body responsible for issuing Brazilian passports, in response to the requirement for access to registered information, the "not specified" option, in these terms, was implemented in the application form passport application in 2007, with the advent of the "New Passport", popularly known as the "blue cape model". Before that, however, the option already existed, and was declared on printed and typed forms in the old "cover model" notebooks green". Following the international standard, the "unspecified" option is represented in the passport with the letter X, instead of the letters M or F, for male or female, respectively. The gender option contained in the passport must reflect the information expressed in the birth certificate or other official identification document. I.e, whenever the information expressed on the certificate is different from "male" or "female", the alternative will be used. The use of option X, or "not specified", comes from the international standard ICAO (International Civil Aviation Organization), which specifies the printing of the "Gender of the holder" by "use of the initial letter commonly used in the country of origin", being "capital letter F for feminine, M for masculine, or X for unspecified". Following ICAO standards, among others, is precisely what confers recognition of a passport by other countries.

Since 12 September 2021, by decision of the National Justice Council, notaries must register intersex children with the sex ignored on birth certificates.

The state of Rio de Janeiro, thanks to the work of the State Public Defender's Office, has been allowing non-binary people to register their birth certificates and identity cards with the "non-binary" gender in gender-neutral language.

On April 22, 2022, Rio Grande do Sul Justice assured non-binary people to change their first name and sex in their birth record, according to their self-perceived identity, regardless of judicial authorization, allowing include the expression "non-binary" in the sex field upon a request made by the interested party to a notary's office.

On May 9, 2022, Bahia Justice published a provision allowing the inclusion of “non-binary” gender in the Civil Registry.

In 2023, Paraíba, Paraná, Tocantins, and Federal District recognized non-binary gender markers. However, in October 2023, the National Justice Council, at the request of the TJES, issued a document precluding "non-binary" as a gender marker. The document quotes Luiz Fux, who claimed that “(…) There is no third gender, nor is this the claim”. In November 2023, TJPR revoked non-binary recognition, establishing that the right to administrative replacement of first name and sex in civil registration does not cover the possibility of expanding genders, limited to “male” and “female”. TJRS, in December 2023, also revoked the provision that recognized non-binary rectification in the state of Rio Grande do Sul.

In January 2024, a public civil action by the Federal Court of Paraná determined that the Federal Revenue must include the options "unspecified", "non-binary" and "intersex" in the sex field of the CPF, guaranteeing the right to rectification to those who interest.

On 6 May 2025, the Superior Court of Justice decided that it is possible to rectify the civil registry to include the neutral gender. The Superior Court's decision only affects the plaintiff, but serves as a precedent that can be followed in similar cases.

Non-binary option on birth certificates, by federative unit
State/District	Recognized?		Date	Notes
State/District	individually	by law	Date	Notes
Acre	Yes	Yes	2025	Government allowed Ariel Sebastos to rectify their gender. Law allows non-binary people to change, however it requires judicial actions still.
Alagoas	Yes	?	2021	Through judicial actions.
Amapá	Yes	?	2022	Positive requests are given for non-binary people to rectify their genders.
Amazonas	?	—		While non-binary people are receiving name change in their documents. But gender options are still binary.
Bahia	Yes	Yes	2022	Without costs, non-binary people can change name and gender statewidely.
Ceará	Yes	—	2024	Notaries allowed to grant non-binary registry. Justice acknowledged in 2024.
Espírito Santo	Yes	?	2024	Justice is allowing people to rectify non-binarily.
Federal District	Yes	Yes	2022	Provision recognizes, and it's possible to rectify directly in notaries.
Goiás	Yes	—	2023	People are receiving positive requests.
Maranhão	Yes	issued	2024	Public Defender is granting non-binary people their rights.
Mato Grosso	?	—		
Mato Grosso do Sul	?	—		
Minas Gerais	Yes	?	2023	Interesteds must be of legal age and present a birth certificate, RG, CPF, voter registration card, and proof of address. Registration is free.
Pará	Yes	?	2025	Judicial actions allow non-binary legal gender.
Paraíba	Yes	Yes	2023	Extrajudicial and administrative acts are allowing anyone to change their gender. Provision exists since 2023.
Paraná	Yes	rerecognized	2021	In 2021, a non-binary person from Foz do Iguaçu changed their sex in civil registry to "indeterminate". Law from 2025 allows registry for sex as "undefined".
Pernambuco	Yes	?	2023	Judicial action recognized.
Piauí	Yes	?	2021	Judicial recognition.
Rio de Janeiro	Yes	—N/a	2020	First effective judicial recognition allowing Aoi Berriel to register their gender as non-binary. And since 2022, non-binary people can change to "não binárie", using gender-neutral neologistic desinence.
Rio Grande do Norte	Yes	Yes	2023	Law from 2023 points individuals can change their gender with no requirements of a reason.
Rio Grande do Sul	Yes	revoked	2021	Collective actions happen since 2021. Recognized through provision since 2022, the law was revoked in 2023.
Rondônia	Yes	?	2022	People can change their gender to non-binary.
Roraima	Yes	?	2025	Free action permits trans and non-binary people to rectify.
Santa Catarina	Yes	?	2020	People from Santa Catarina and residents are receiving documents constating non-binary gender judicially, or directly in notarial offices, however unprescribed from a specific law.
São Paulo	Yes	—N/a	2021	3rd Chamber of Private Law of the TJ/SP authorized the change of the civil registry, favorabilizing the inclusion of the terms "non-binary", "agender", and/or "unspecified" in the "sex" field.
Sergipe	Yes	Yes	2025	Law recognizes non-binary people.
Tocantins	Yes	Yes	2022	Judiciary provision allows the exclusion of the female or male gender annotation and the inclusion of the expression "non-binary", upon request of the party at the time of the request.

==== Chile ====
A ruling of the Third Family Court of Santiago, issued on April 25, 2022, ordered the Civil Registry and Identification Service to register a 17-year-old adolescent with non-binary gender on the birth certificate, being the first judicial resolution of its kind in the country. On May 25, 2022, the First Civil Court of Santiago issued a ruling recognizing an adult person as non-binary and ordering the Civil Registry to rectify the birth certificate, in which the marker "X" will appear instead of " female or male." On October 14, 2022, the Civil Registry officially issued to Shane Cienfuegos the first non-binary identity card with the marker "X" in the country. In July 2022, the Thirteenth Chamber of the Santiago Court of Appeals had ruled in favor of the request to rectify the birth certificate to recognize non-binary gender identity.

==== Colombia ====
In February 2022, the Constitutional Court of Colombia ruled that a non-binary person was entitled to a birth certificate from the Ninth Notary of Medellín and citizen's identity card from the National Civil Registry with the marker "no binario" or "NB" in the sex field on both. The court also ordered the Colombian government to facilitate the inclusion of such a marker on identity documents and ordered the Congress to amend laws as needed to facilitate legal recognition of non-binary individuals' rights.

==== Uruguay ====
Since 19 October 2018, a new law in Uruguay allows people to change their gender/sex entry on a self-determined basis without requiring any medical documents. The law also provides a basis for social protection, anti-discrimination efforts, quotas and reparations.

In Law 19,684, Article 4(C) explicitly recognizes non-binary gender persons in its definitions, and Article 6 guarantees the right to legal identification correction on this basis. However, according to the 2022 Non-binary people survey conducted by the City of Montevideo, one of the reasons that influence non-binary people not to use the legal gender change procedure is because there is no non-binary gender option.

== See also ==
- List of non-binary political office-holders
- Gender self-identification
- Legal recognition of intersex people
- Non-binary discrimination
- Right to personal identity
- Transgender rights
