= R (Christie Elan-Cane) v Secretary of State for the Home Department =

UK Supreme Court case

- Court: Supreme Court of the United Kingdom
- Decided: 15 December 2021
- Citation: [2021] UKSC 56

Case history
- Prior action: [2020] EWCA Civ 363

Court membership
- Judges sitting: Robert Reed, David Lloyd Jones, Mary Arden, Philip Sales, Vivien Rose

R (Christie Elan-Cane) v Secretary of State for the Home Department was a UK court case that ruled that the Home Office did not have an obligation to offer a third gender "X" option on passports.

== Background ==
Legal recognition of non-binary gender has advanced in the 2010s, with several governments introducing third gender options (usually in form of an "X" alongside "M" and "F") on passports, such as Australia, Argentina, Canada, Denmark, Nepal, and Uruguay. The International Civil Aviation Organization accepts "X" as an option for travel documents in its official guidelines.

While the UK currently does not offer a third gender option for passports, the 2010s saw an increase in calls for the introduction of such an option. Between July 2017 and March 2019, 83 MPs signed an early day motion calling for the British government to introduce a third gender on British passports.

== Summary ==
Christie Elan-Cane is a British non-gendered activist who has been active in campaigning for LGBT+ rights since the 1990s. With law firm Clifford Chance, Elan-Cane sued the Home Office in the 2010s over its refusal to issue passports with a third gender "X" option.

In 2018, the High Court ruled in favour of the Home Office.

In March 2020, the Court of Appeal confirmed the High Court ruling, finding that "there was no positive obligation on the state to provide an “X” marker in order to ensure the right of the Appellant to respect for private life." The Court of Appeal also ruled that there was no consensus yet among the Council of Europe on gender neutral passports and that there was no wide-ranging plan for gender neutral options in British government ID systems.

In January 2021, it was announced that the UK Supreme Court would hear the appeal in mid-July of that year. In December 2021, the Supreme Court of the United Kingdom issued its judgment, ruling against Elan-Cane. The court's judgment ruled that the European Convention on Human Rights did not require states to issue an "X" option and that there was "no legislation in the United Kingdom which recognises a non-gendered category of individuals." Elan-Cane pledged to appeal the ruling to the European Court of Human Rights.

== See also ==
- Legal recognition of non-binary gender
