= Elisa Rae Shupe =

First person in the U.S. to be legally declared non-binary (1963–2025)

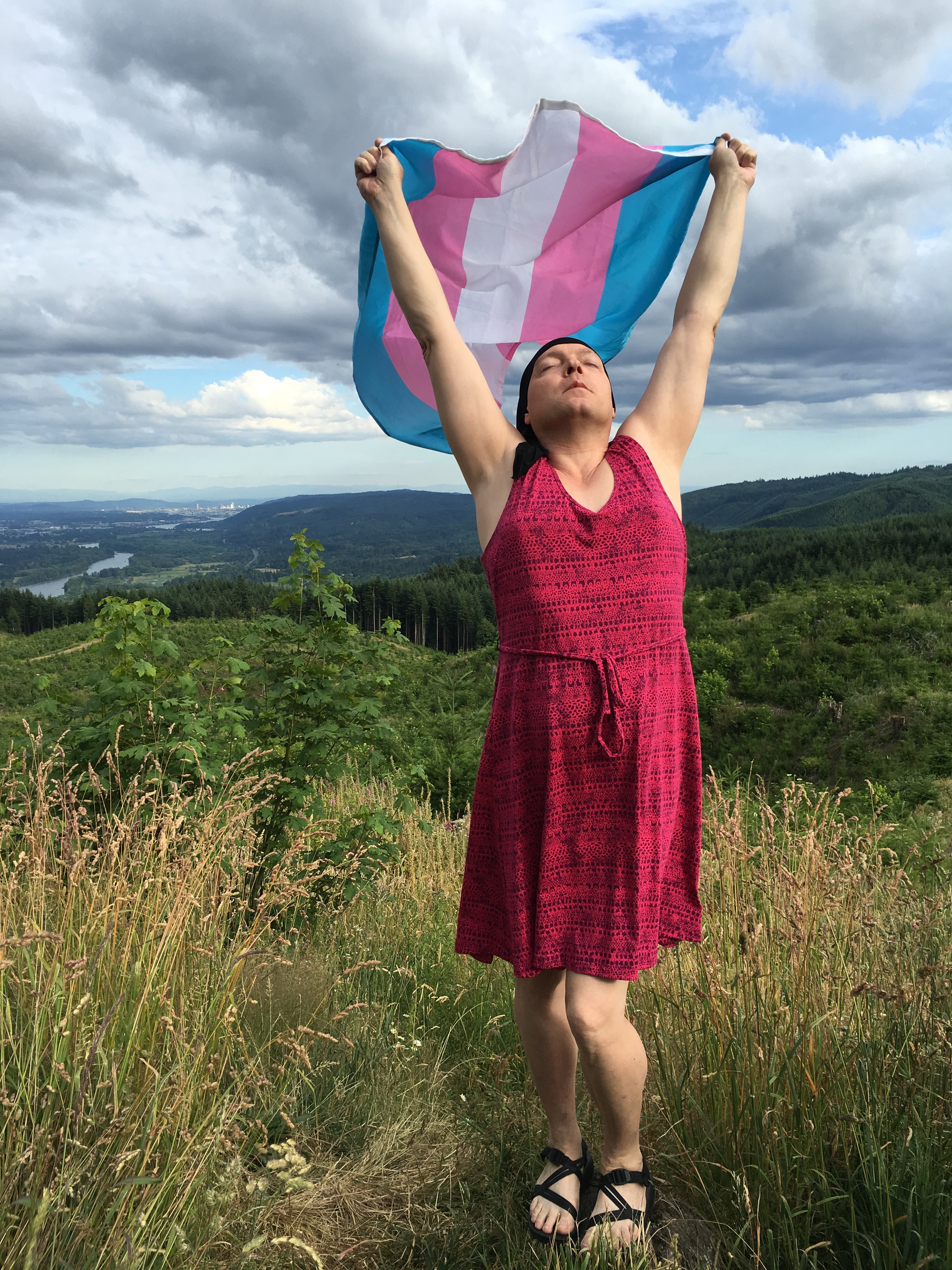
- Shupe holding a transgender flag, 2016
- Born: August 10, 1963; Washington, D.C., U.S.
- Died: January 27, 2025 (aged 61); Syracuse, New York, U.S.
- Military career
- Children: 1
- Allegiance: United States
- Branch: United States Army
- Service years: 1982–2000
- Rank: Sergeant First Class
- Awards: Meritorious Service Medal (2); Army Commendation Medal (4); Army Achievement Medal (8)

Elisa Rae Shupe (August 10, 1963 – January 27, 2025), formerly Jamie Shupe, was a soldier in the United States Army who in 2016 became the first person in the United States to obtain legal recognition of a non-binary gender. In 2019, she (Note: Shupe identified as a non-binary transgender woman and used she/her pronouns at the time of her death.) released a statement explaining that she had "returned to [her] male birth sex". In 2022, she published a statement reclaiming her trans identity and condemning the anti-trans movement due to her story being used to push conversion therapy.

== Early life ==
Assigned male at birth, Shupe was born on August 10, 1963, in Washington, D.C. and grew up in Southern Maryland with seven siblings. She was sexually abused by a relative when she was in elementary school, and her mother physically abused her for behaving like a "sissy" as a young teen. Shupe scored unusually high on the Armed Services Vocational Aptitude Battery and entered the armed forces after graduating from high school.

== Military service ==
Shupe began serving in the U.S. Army before the enactment of "Don't ask, don't tell". During her eighteen years of service, she was prevented from exploring her gender identity and sexual orientation and was often the target of homophobic comments. Shupe retired in 2000 as a sergeant first class with a number of military decorations.

== Gender identity ==
=== Early transition ===
Toward the end of her military service, Shupe's gender dysphoria began intensifying, and she started experimenting with wearing women's clothing at home. After retiring, she moved to Pittsburgh with her wife and began living as a trans woman in 2013. She chose the gender-neutral first name "Jamie" and convinced the Army to change her sex marker to female on military records.

In June 2016, Shupe successfully petitioned a Multnomah County, Oregon, court to change her sex designation to non-binary, in the first legal recognition of a non-binary gender in the United States. That November, she was issued a birth certificate in Washington, D.C., with a sex marker of "unknown". Lambda Legal later cited Shupe's petition as a legal precedent for non-binary gender markers in the passport lawsuit Zzyym v. Pompeo. San Diego Gay and Lesbian News argued that her case was a "significant victory for the trans community".

In 2018, Shupe critiqued gender-affirming surgery, cautioning against what she said were high complication rates. She also expressed opposition to transgender people serving in the military.

=== Detransition ===
In January 2019, Shupe announced that she no longer identified as non-binary and was returning to identifying as male. Shupe expressed an intention to de-transition in an essay in a conservative publication, The Daily Signal. The essay went viral among opponents of transgender rights. Shupe spoke at a Family Policy Alliance event and was then invited to a secretive group of anti-transgender-rights politicians led by Fred Deutsch. Mentally unwell at the time, with a 100 percent disability rating and diagnoses of C-PTSD and borderline personality disorder, Shupe eventually felt exploited by the conservative groups.

=== Retransition ===
In 2021, Shupe began using the name "Lisa Shupe", and in 2022 published a statement that during her detransition she helped sell conversion therapy to the public while privately self-medicating with estrogen, which resulted in a life-threatening blood clot. She stated: "I also authored this to hopefully prevent these groups from further using me as a pawn in their vicious war, legislative and otherwise, against the transgender community. For the record, I have formally renounced my previous ties and allegiance to radical and gender-critical feminists, conservatives, and faith-based groups." Shortly after in 2022, she received a legal name change to "Elisa Rae Shupe".

In March 2023, Shupe leaked over 2,600 pages of emails, spanning a period from 2017 to 2023, between her and a group of what Mother Jones calls "representatives of a network of activists and organizations at the forefront of the anti-trans movement".

== Publication and copyright controversy ==
In 2023, Shupe self-published an autofiction novel titled "AI Machinations: Tangled Webs and Typed Words" that was extensively written using ChatGPT artificial intelligence software.

Upon initial submission of her copyright application, the US Copyright Office (USCO) declined to register her work as their policy does not extend copyright protection to AI-generated content. Subsequently, Shupe sought an appeal, contending that she should be afforded copyright protection under the Americans with Disabilities Act (ADA) on the basis that she used ChatGPT as an assistive technology due to her cognitive disabilities. The appeal further asserted that she should be granted copyright for the selection, coordination, and arrangement of the AI-generated text.

As a result of the appeal, the USCO reversed its initial decision and granted Shupe a limited copyright registration. The USCO acknowledged Shupe as the author of the "selection, coordination, and arrangement of text generated by artificial intelligence", yet did not extend copyright protection to the actual sentences and paragraphs themselves. This effectively allows Shupe to prevent the unauthorized reproduction of the entirety of the book.

The case has attracted commentary from observers who highlight the difficulties faced by the USCO in determining how to handle copyrights for works that incorporate AI.

== Personal life and death ==
Shupe met her future wife, Sandy, while stationed at Fort Knox. The two married in 1987 and have one daughter.

=== Death ===
Shupe died by suicide at a Veterans Affairs hospital building in Syracuse, New York, on January 27, 2025. She was found wrapped in a transgender pride flag. Her death was mourned by LGBTQ+ communities across upstate New York and she was remembered as part of a vigil in Winnipeg. In her suicide note, Shupe refused an American military burial for herself.

== See also ==
- Dana Zzyym, first person to receive a non-binary passport marker in the United States
