= Débora Menezes (politician) =

Brazilian politician (born 1994)

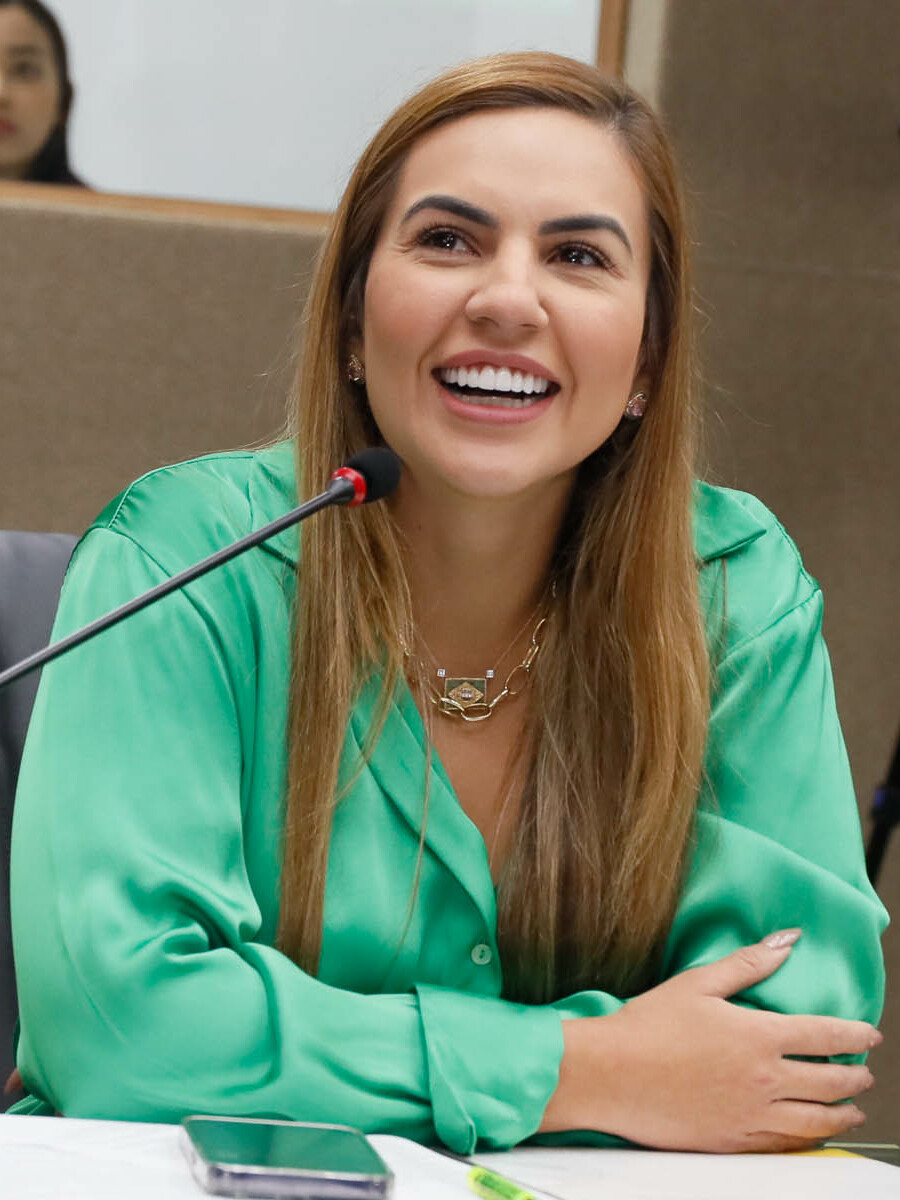
- Menezes in 2023

Member of the Legislative Assembly of Amazonas
- Incumbent
- Assumed office 1 February 2023

Personal details
- Born: 11 July 1994 (age 32)
- Party: Liberal Party (since 2022)

Débora Salgueiro de Menezes (born 11 July 1994) is a Brazilian politician serving as a member of the Legislative Assembly of Amazonas since 2023. She has served as chairwoman of the childhood and adolescence committee since 2025.
