= Non-binary =

Gender identities outside of the gender binary

- Non-binary pride flag
- Classification: Gender identity
- Abbreviations: NB; Enby (Note: The abbreviation "enby" is based on the English phonetic pronunciation of the initialism "NB", standing for "Non-Binary".)

Other terms
- Synonyms: Genderqueer
- Associated terms: Third gender; genderfluid; two-spirit; gender nonconforming

Non-binary (Note: Also spelled nonbinary. The term enby, derived from the abbreviation NB, is also used.) (also written as nonbinary) or genderqueer gender identities are those that are outside the male/female gender binary. Non-binary identities often fall under the transgender umbrella since non-binary people typically identify with a gender that is different from the sex assigned to them at birth, although some non-binary people do not consider themselves transgender.

Non-binary people may identify as an intermediate or separate third gender, identify with more than one gender or no gender, or have a fluctuating gender identity. Gender identity is separate from sexual or romantic orientation; non-binary people have various sexual orientations.

Non-binary people as a group vary in their gender expressions, and some may reject gender identity altogether. Some non-binary people receive gender-affirming care to reduce the mental distress caused by gender dysphoria, such as gender-affirming surgery or hormone replacement therapy.

== Terms and definitions ==
The term genderqueer first appeared in queer zines of the 1980s and early 1990s. It gained prominence in the mid-1990s through activists, such as Riki Anne Wilchins, who used it to describe individuals deviating from traditional gender norms. In a 1995 newsletter published by The Transexual Menace, Wilchins wrote that the new fight against gender oppression was political and:

It's about all of us who are genderqueer: diesel dykes and stone butches, leatherqueens and radical fairies, nelly fags, crossdressers, intersexed, transexuals, transvestites, transgendered, transgressively gendered, and those of us whose gender expressions are so complex they haven't even been named yet.

Similar terms that preceded genderqueer included genderfuck and genderbender. In the context of 1990s early queer activism, genderqueer began as a political stance for resisting the gender binary; the term carried the non-normative and anti-assimilationist connotations of the recently reclaimed word queer. In 2002, the term had further dissemination through the anthology GenderQueer: Voices From Beyond the Sexual Binary.

Genderqueer evolved into both an umbrella term for identities outside the gender binary and an adjective or self-identity term for those who challenge or diverge from conventional gender norms, or who "queer" gender. The rise of the internet and public identification by celebrities brought the term genderqueer into mainstream awareness during the late 2000s and early 2010s.

The term non-binary was not in widespread use until the early 2010s, when it quickly increased in popularity and surpassed genderqueer as the most-used umbrella term for all people who do not exclusively identify as women/girls or men/boys. The popularity of non-binary is sometimes credited to the fact that it has a more neutral and less political connotation than genderqueer to many people. Some critics of non-binary dislike it because the term itself reinforces the concept of a binary.

Today, there is broad overlap in the meaning and usages of genderqueer and non-binary, although they still carry different connotations for many people. As umbrella terms, both are used to encompass a wide range of identities and expressions that transcend the binary gender categories of man and woman.

The term transgender often includes those who are genderqueer or non-binary, reflecting a broad spectrum of gender diversity. This inclusive usage dates back to at least 1992, with significant contributions from figures such as Leslie Feinberg and Kate Bornstein, who emphasized the shared experiences of "gender outlaws."

Other related umbrella terms include gender nonconforming, gender expansive, and gender diverse. Gender nonconforming usually refers to those whose gender expression does not match masculine or feminine gender norms, but it has been alternately used in some contexts (particularly prior to the widespread use of non-binary) to refer to people whose gender identities do not match binary gender norms. Some US organizations such as the Human Rights Campaign and Gender Spectrum use gender expansive to denote a broader range of gender identities and expressions than those typically associated with the binary gender system. Many organizations in Australia and the UK use gender diverse to refer to people who "[do] not conform to their society's norms or values when it comes to their gendered physicality, gendered identity, gender expression or combination of those factors."

The term enby, derived from the English pronunciation of the acronym NB for non-binary, is also sometimes used.

Enbian refers to attraction and relationship between non-binary people, while diamoric is attraction and relationship involving at least one non-binary individual.

Additionally, being non-binary is associated with gender ambiguity. Androgyny (also androgyne) is often used to describe a blend of socially defined masculine and feminine traits. However, not all non-binary individuals are androgynous; some identify with traditionally masculine or feminine traits, use alternative descriptors such as masculine woman or feminine man, or experience or express themselves in ways that fluidly change between feminine and masculine at different times.

Being non-binary is also not the same as being intersex. Most intersex people identify as either men or women, although some identify as only non-binary, some identify as non-binary and genderfluid, while others identify as non-binary men or non-binary women. A national UK survey conducted in 2017 found that, of 1,980 intersex respondents, 38% identified as women, 32% as men, and 25% as non-binary.

== Theories of non-binary gender ==
Gender is often framed as social or psychological and sex as biological; however, it is difficult to draw a clear line between them. For example, Julia Serano argues that gender identity arises from a range of interconnected social and biological determinants. A review of twin studies supports this position: the authors provide evidence that gender identity is a complex trait with a heritable polygenic component, which means that gender involves social determinants and a large number of genes each making a small contribution, rather than a single gender identity gene. Life experiences also shape biology, since learning from experience produces structural changes in the brain.

One approach to understanding non-binary gender is the norm-relevancy account, developed by Katharine Jenkins. The core idea of this account is that the gendered norms people experience as relevant to them, such as how they should dress or behave in social situations, define their gender – regardless of whether they actually comply with those norms. According to this account, someone in a society with dominant male and female genders is non‑binary if they experience elements of both male and female gender norms as relevant, or if neither set of norms feels relevant to them. The norms are not universal; they are assumed to vary across places and over time.

Another account, developed by Robin Dembroff specifically for genderqueer identity, defines genderqueer as an example of a critical gender kind. A critical gender kind is one such that people who are that gender "collectively destabilize one or more core elements of the dominant gender ideology in that society". This contrasts with an uncritical gender kind, which aligns with and perpetuates dominant binary gender norms, such as the assumed link between someone's role in sexual reproduction and their gender. On Dembroff's account, the approach associated with the gender critical movement would count as an uncritical gender kind.

Dembroff emphasises that this destabilization is carried out by genderqueer people as a group rather than individually. Examples of how genderqueer people collectively enact this destabilisation include using they/them or neopronouns; expressing their gender in ways that challenge binary norms, both individually and in how they navigate gender roles in relationships; and alternating between spaces that are socially coded as "male" and "female".

== Identities ==
=== Agender ===
Agender individuals, also known as genderless, gender-free, non-gendered, or ungendered, have no gender at all. This group represents a spectrum of identities that diverge from conventional gender norms. A 2017 analysis of surveys of gender identity found that, of the transgender participants, 14% identified as agender. Gender Census, an international survey of non-binary people, found in 2025 that 25% of participants identified as agender.

According to the Oxford English Dictionary, which added an entry for agender in 2016, the first recorded use of the word was in 1996, as "A-gender", in an article in the Independent. In 2014, the agender flag was created by Salom X, and "agender" and "neutrois" were among the custom gender options added to Facebook and to OkCupid. In 2017, Judge Amy Holmes Hehn ruled that Patch, an agender resident of Portland, could be legally identified as agender.

=== Bigender ===
Bigender individuals possess two distinct gender identities that can manifest simultaneously or fluctuate between masculine and feminine expressions. This differs from genderfluid identities, which may not involve fixed gender states but rather a fluid range across the gender spectrum. The American Psychological Association recognizes bigender identity as part of the broader transgender category. Surveys and studies, including a 1999 San Francisco Department of Public Health survey and a 2016 Harris poll, have documented the prevalence of bigender identification, particularly within younger generations. Trigender people can shift among any three genders, but usually male, female, and a third gender.

=== Demigender ===
Individuals identifying as demigender feel a partial connection to one gender while also identifying with another gender or none at all (agender). Subcategories include demi-boy or demi-man, who partially identify as male and non-binary, and demi-girl or demi-woman, who are partially female and non-binary. Demiflux people experience a stable non-binary identity with varying intensities of other gender identities.

=== Genderfluid ===
Genderfluid individuals do not adhere to a fixed gender identity; their genders change depending on time, place and situation, combining elements from one or more genders at different times. This identity can overlap with bigender, trigender, polygender or pangender expressions.

=== Pangender ===
Pangender individuals identify with multiple or all genders, sometimes experiencing all these identities simultaneously.

=== Polygender ===
Polygender, plurigender or multigender is a non-binary identity in which the person experiences multiple genders. Pangender, bigender, and trigender are examples of multi-gender identities, sometimes along with androgyne, associated with demigender.

=== Two-spirit ===
Originating from a 1990 Indigenous LGBTQ gathering in Winnipeg, the term two-spirit refers to individuals within Indigenous North American communities who embody qualities or fulfill roles across traditional gender distinctions.

=== Xenogender ===
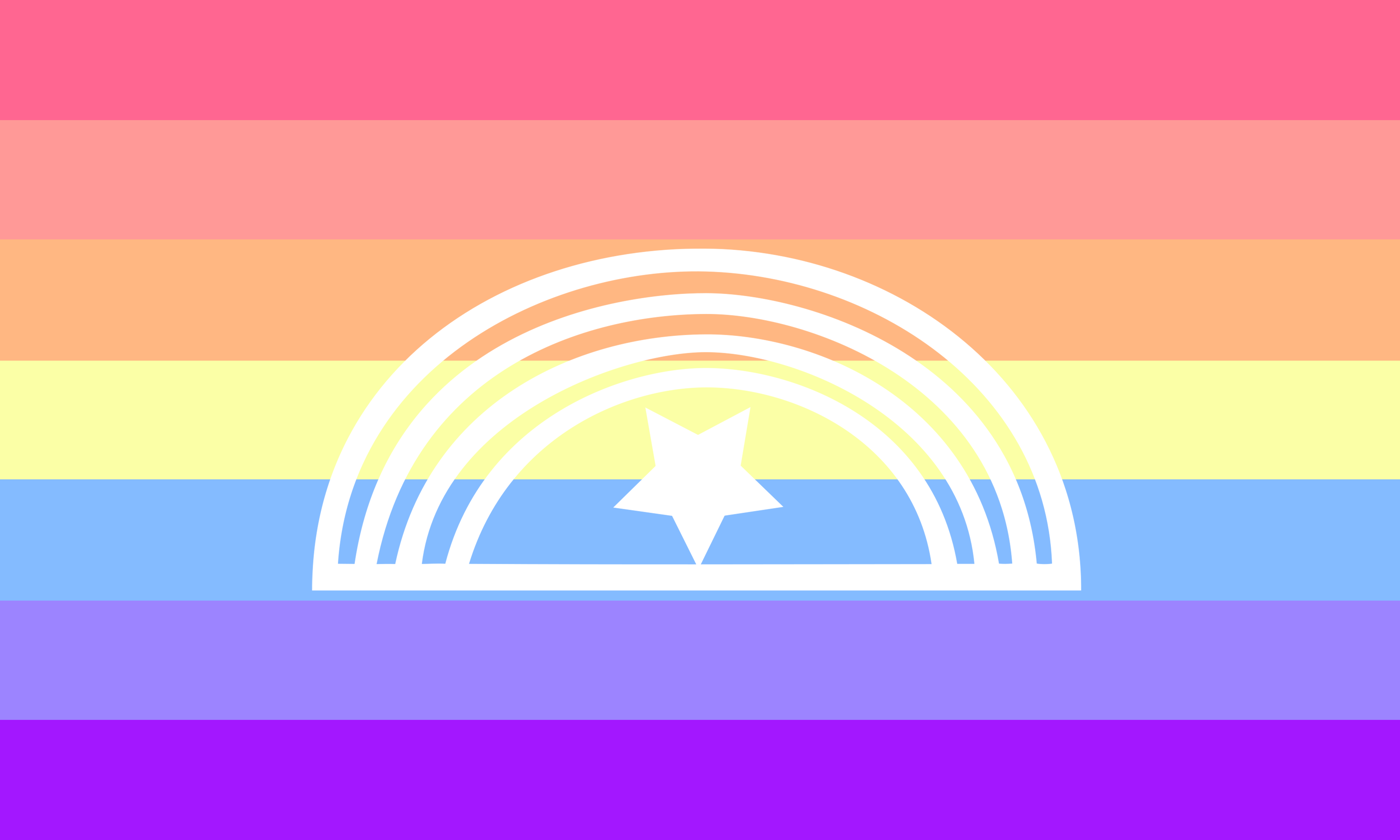
Xenogender flag, designed by DeviantArt user Pastelmemer

Xenogender encompasses a variety of gender identities that are defined using concepts not based on traditional male or female categories, often drawn from natural, inanimate, or abstract sources, representing a departure from the typical human gender binary. People who identify with a xenogender may not have the words to describe their gender, so instead they compare it to something else. The term was coined in 2014 by Tumblr user Baaphomett.

== History ==
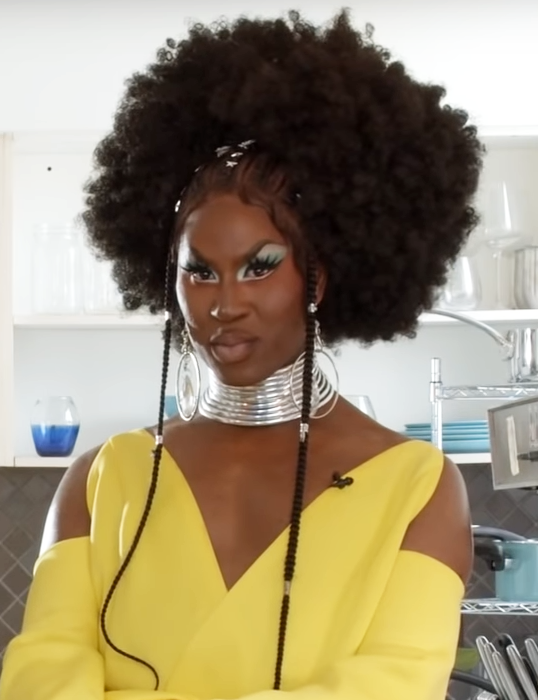
Drag queen and musician Shea Couleé, who identifies as gay and non-binary and uses "they/them" pronouns offstage

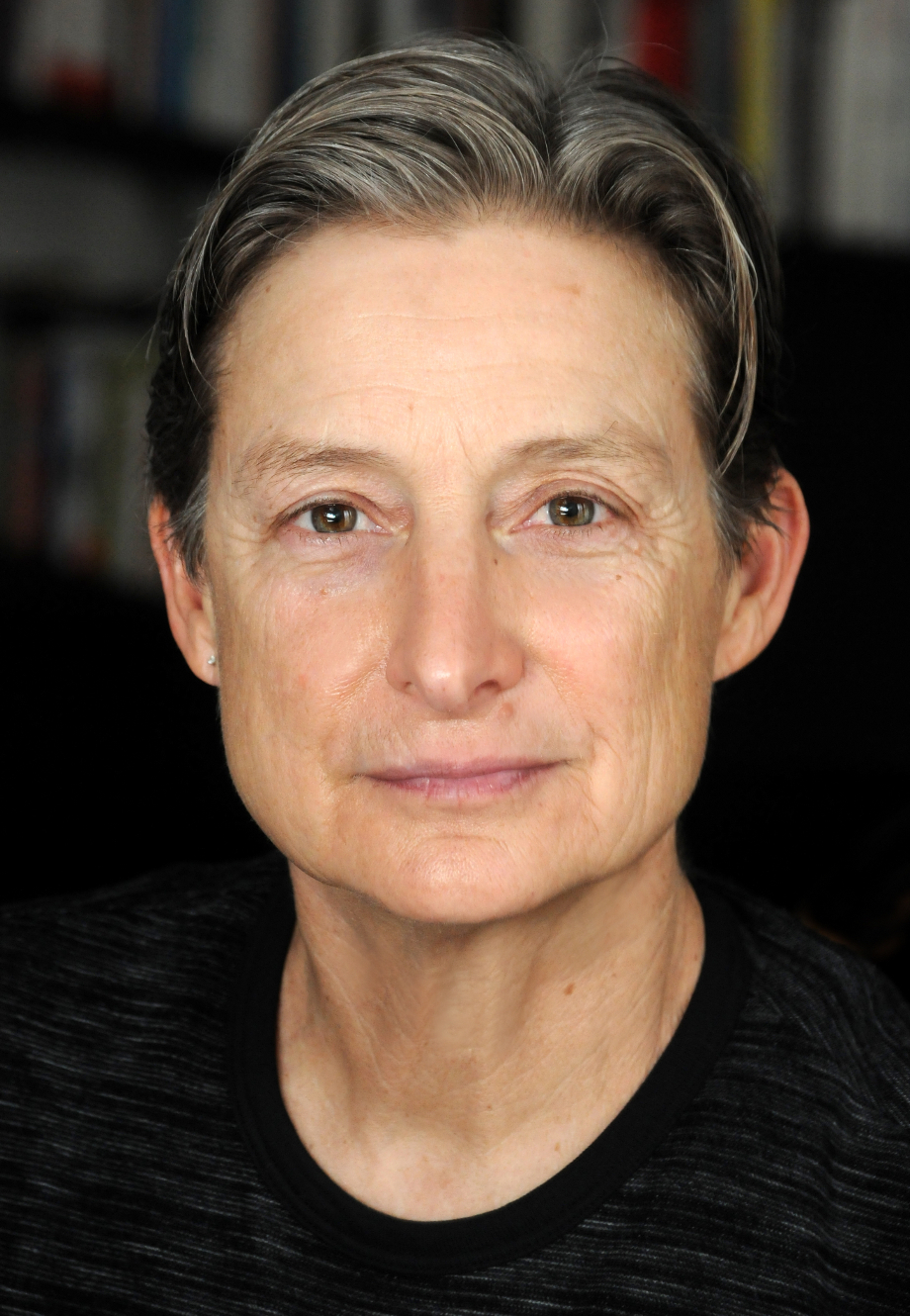
Judith Butler, an American philosopher, who published Gender Trouble in 1990 and publicly came out as non-binary in 2019, is a contemporary figure in the non-binary movement.

Non-binary gender, often included within the concept of third gender, has historical roots that extend well before the modern term was established. For instance, the Public Universal Friend, who emerged in 1776, was a genderless evangelist who renounced their birth name and gendered pronouns, representing an early instance of non-binary gender expression in America.

In 1781, Jens Andersson from Norway, assigned female at birth but identifying as male, faced imprisonment and a trial after marrying a woman. When questioned, Andersson stated, "Hand troer at kunde henhøre til begge Deele" ('He believes he belongs to both parts'), indicating a recognition of his dual gender identity.

Judith Butler's Gender Trouble, published in 1990, challenged the fixed male/female binary and advocated for a broader understanding of gender as a spectrum, a view Butler has expanded upon since coming out as non-binary in 2019.

The term "genderqueer" surfaced in the mid-1990s, notably used by activist Riki Wilchins in the newsletter In Your Face in 1995, and later in their 1997 autobiography. Wilchins contributed significantly to the discourse, particularly with the 2002 anthology GenderQueer: Voices from beyond the Sexual Binary.

Jim Sinclair, an autism-rights activist and a founder of Autism Network International, publicly embraced a gender-neutral identity in 1997, declaring a physical and social neuter status in an introduction to the Intersex Society of North America.

In Japan, the expression "X-gender" (x-jendā) has been recognized since the late 1990s, describing a non-binary identity, with notable individuals such as manga artists Yūki Kamatani and Yuu Watase identifying as such.

In 2012, the Intersex & Genderqueer Recognition Project began advocating for more inclusive gender options on official documents, a milestone realized when Elisa Rae Shupe became the first person in the U.S. to obtain official documents with a non-binary gender marker.

Alberta legislator Estefan Cortes-Vargas openly identified as non-binary during a 2015 legislative session, marking a significant moment in political recognition of non-binary identities.

On January 20, 2025, immediately after being sworn in for his second term, President Donald Trump signed an executive order titled "Defending Women from Gender Ideology Extremism and Restoring Biological Truth to the Federal Government". This order established that the U.S. federal government would recognize only two sexes—male and female—defined strictly by biological characteristics at birth. It explicitly rejected the concept of gender identity as a basis for legal recognition for non-binary people. However, the U.S. Department of State indicated in 2025 that passports with the gender marker X will remain valid until expiration. The ACLU filed a class action lawsuit Orr v. Trump, arguing the policies are discriminatory under the law, including the Equal Protection Clause and constitutes compelled speech.

== Pronouns and titles ==
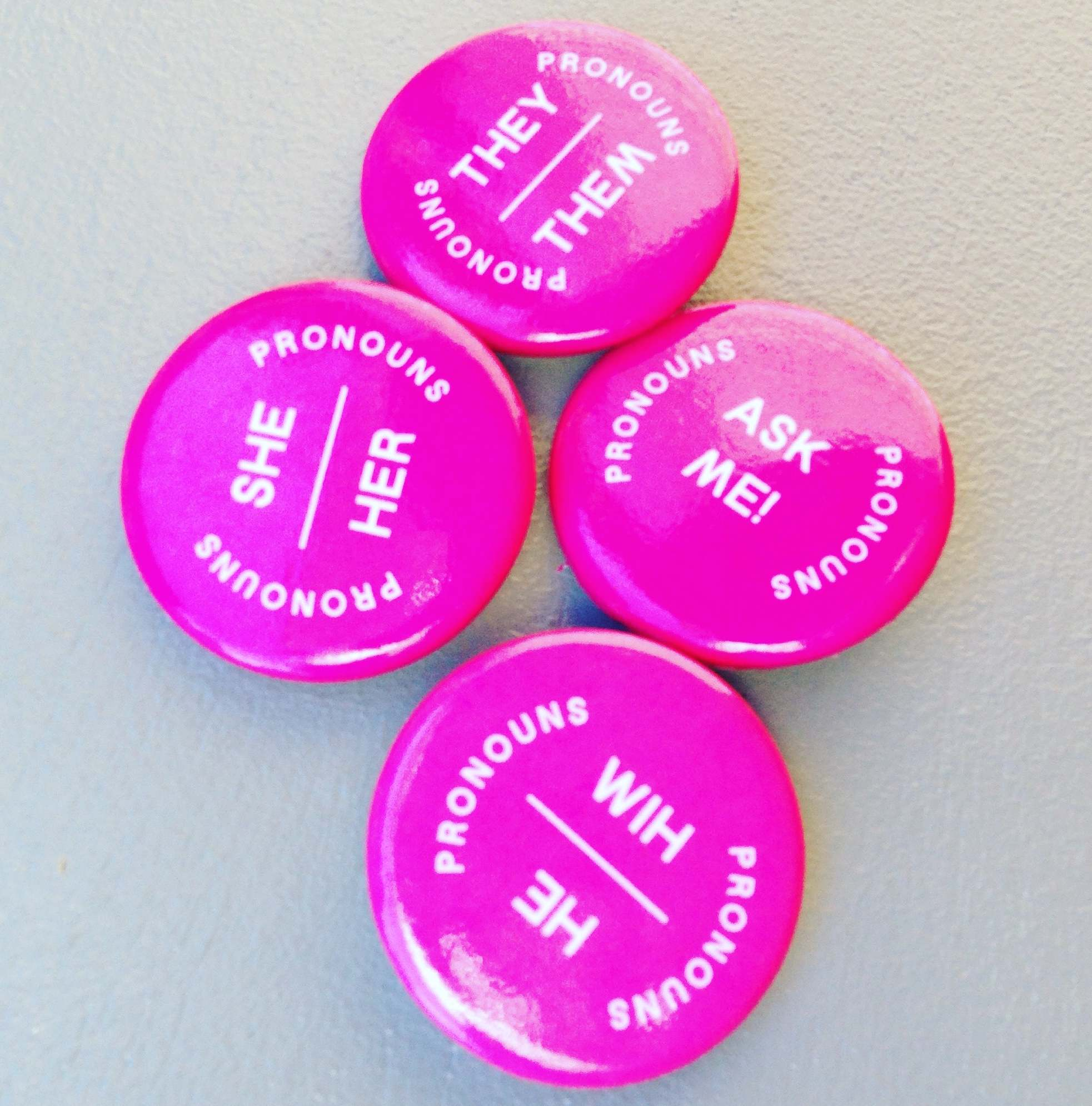
Pronoun pin badges from a 2016 art and tech festival

Many non-binary people use gender-neutral pronouns with the singular "they", "their" and "them" being used most commonly in English. Some non-binary individuals opt for neopronouns such as xe, ze, sie, co, and ey. Others may use traditional gender-specific pronouns such as "he" or "she", switch between them, or prefer to use their name without pronouns. Gender Census, which since 2013 has run a worldwide annual survey of English-speaking non-binary people, surveyed 43,000 people in 2025 and found that the most common pronouns respondents use for themselves were "they/them" (75%), "he/him" (41%), "she/her" (34%), "it/its" (23%), no personal pronouns at all (14%), and any pronouns (14%). Thirty-three percent of respondents reported using a neopronoun such as xe, ze, fae, or ey at least some of the time.

The title Mx. is sometimes used as a gender-neutral honorific. Invented in the 1970s, it began being used by non-binary people in online discussion spaces in the late 1990s and early 2000s and became increasingly popular in the 2010s. According to Gender Census, Mx. has been decreasing in popularity over the last decade; in 2025 only 15% of respondents reported using Mx., while 43% preferred no honorific at all. Smaller numbers of non-binary people use Mr. (11%), Ms. or Miss (9%), or a non-gendered professional, academic, religious, military, or nobility title (9%).

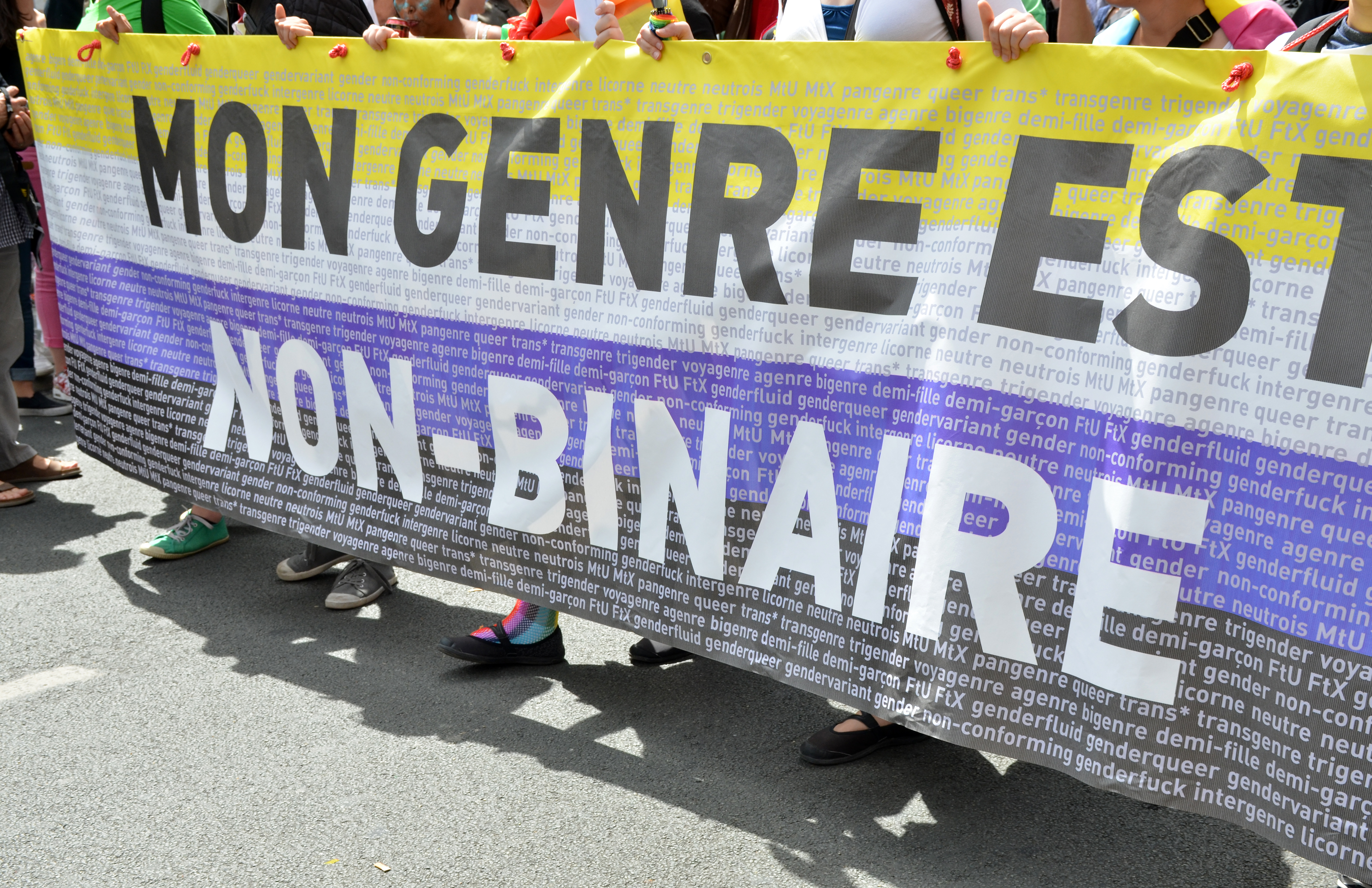
A non-binary pride flag at a parade in Paris reading Mon genre est non-binaire ('My gender is non-binary')

The 2025 Gender Census also found that the five most commonly selected identity labels among people who aren't exclusively women/girls or men/boys were non-binary (62%), queer (56%), trans (47%), transgender (41%), and a category described as a person/human/[my name]/"I'm just me" (40%).

== Legal recognition ==
Third gender recognition world map (2025)

Many non-binary/genderqueer people use the gender they were given at birth to conduct everyday business, as many institutions and forms of identification—such as passports and driver's licenses — accept, in the sense of recorded recognition, only binary gender identities. But with the increasing acceptance of non-binary gender identities and the rise in wider societal recognition, this is slowly changing, as more governments and institutions recognize and allow non-binary identities.

Multiple countries legally recognize non-binary or third gender classifications. Some non-Western societies have long recognized transgender people as a third gender, although this may not (or may only recently) include formal legal recognition. In Western societies, Australia may have been the first country to legally recognize a classification of sex outside of "male" and "female" on legal documentation, with the recognition of Alex MacFarlane's intersex status in 2003. The wider legal recognition of non-binary people—following the recognition of intersex people in 2003—in Australian law followed between 2010 and 2014, with legal action taken against the New South Wales Government Registry of Births, Deaths and Marriages by transgender activist Norrie May-Welby to recognize Norrie's legal gender identity as "non-specific". India's Supreme Court formally recognized transgender and non-binary people as a distinct third gender in 2014, following legal action taken by transgender activist Laxmi Narayan Tripathi. In July 2021, Argentina incorporated non-binary gender in its national ID card, becoming the first country in South America to legally recognize non-binary gender on all official documentation; non-binary people in the country will have the option to renew their ID with the letter "X" under gender.

=== United States ===
Legal recognition of non-binary gender identities in the United States has varied significantly across time and jurisdictions. In June 2016, a court in Oregon issued the first known ruling in the U.S. recognizing a non-binary gender. In subsequent years, several states, beginning with California in 2017, enacted legislation or adopted policies allowing residents to select a non-binary or "X" gender marker on official documents such as driver's licenses and birth certificates. As of early 2025, over 20 states and the District of Columbia continue to offer non-binary gender markers on some state-issued documents.

At the federal level, non-binary recognition advanced during the early 2020s. In 2021, the U.S. Department of State issued the first passport bearing an "X" gender marker, and beginning in April 2022, this option became available to all applicants without medical documentation. However, this policy was reversed in January 2025 when President Donald Trump issued an executive order directing federal agencies to recognize only male and female categories. The U.S. Department of State subsequently suspended all new passport applications requesting an "X" marker, though previously issued passports with an "X" designation remain valid until expiration.

Legal protections for non-binary individuals under U.S. federal law remain limited. While Title VII of the Civil Rights Act of 1964 has been interpreted to prohibit employment discrimination based on gender nonconformity and transgender status, there are no explicit nationwide protections that specifically name non-binary individuals or ensure their rights across areas such as identification, healthcare, housing, or public services. As a result, access to recognition and protection continues to depend heavily on state and local laws and policies.

== Discrimination ==
Various countries throughout history have criminalized transgender and non-binary gender identities.

In the U.S., 13% of respondents to the 2008 National Transgender Discrimination Survey chose "a gender not listed here". (Note: Q3 asked "What is your primary gender identity today?". Possible answers were male, female, "part time as one gender, part time as another", and "a gender not listed here, please specify".) The "not listed here" respondents were more likely than the general sample (36% compared to 27%) to report forgoing healthcare due to fear of discrimination. 90 percent reported experiencing anti-trans bias at work, and 43 percent reported having attempted suicide.

The reported discrimination non-binary people face includes disregard, disbelief, condescending interactions, and disrespect. Non-binary people are also often viewed as partaking in a trend and thus dismissed as insincere or attention-seeking. As an accumulation, erasure is often a significant form of discrimination non-binary people face.

Misgendering, intentional or not, is also a problem that many face. In the case of intentional misgendering, transphobia is a driving force. Additionally, the use of they/them pronouns is lumped into the larger, controversial, subject of safe spaces and political correctness, causing pushback and intentional misgendering by some people.

Non-binary and transgender people also face discrimination in sports participation. Non-binary athletes have an immediate barrier as most sports competitions are divided into men's and women's categories. Harassment when using public bathrooms is also frequent. According to the Trevor Project, 58% of non-binary and transgender youth have been discouraged from using the bathroom corresponding to their gender identity.

== Healthcare ==
Non-binary people may report significantly worse health and general well being than binary transgender people, although current research demonstrates conflicting perspectives on this topic. These health disparities may be exacerbated by minority stress by breaking gender and social norms.

Healthcare professionals are often uninformed about non-binary people's specific health needs, sometimes requiring non-binary patients to educate them. Some providers may believe that non-binary people do not require transition-related treatment, while others may not understand the difference between their identity and the identities of binary transgender patients. Non-binary patients report lower rates of respect from healthcare providers than binary transgender people.

Beliefs that affirm the existence of gender/sex diversity are associated negatively with prejudices toward non-binary people.

=== Transgender health care ===
Some non-binary people desire gender-affirming health care, including gender-affirming hormone therapy or surgery. Others do not, and the ratio of those who desire care to those who do not is unclear. The factors that lead to this decision are complex and unique to each person.

Non-binary people may also have distinct transition goals compared to binary trans individuals, posing several challenges for effective gender-affirming care. In particular, the desire for partial feminization or masculinization poses several challenges for hormone therapy. Masculinizing hormone therapy such as testosterone may be used in significantly lower doses than in binary transgender men to achieve desired results. Feminizing hormone therapy may be used to develop feminine secondary sex characteristics such as breast growth, fat redistribution, and skin changes. For those who desire partial feminization, selective estrogen receptor modulators are being explored as a potential option to minimize breast growth while developing other feminine phenotypes. These medications are typically used alongside an antiandrogen or GnRH agonist to suppress testosterone, as selective estrogen receptor modulators lack the antigonadotropic properties of estrogens. Non-binary hormone therapy is a far more recent development compared to hormone therapy for binary transgender individuals, and this is still a developing field of medicine.

Non-binary patients seeking gender-affirming care typically begin treatment earlier than binary transgender patients.

=== Mental health care ===
Due to the discrimination and harassment they face, non-binary and transgender people are more likely to have worse mental health outcomes than cisgender people. According to the Trevor Project, 54% of non-binary and transgender youth have considered suicide. However, the presence of protective factors, such as acceptance of one's gender diversity, support from family and community, and connection with the broader non-binary community, result in markedly better mental health outcomes for non-binary and transgender people.

== Symbols and observances ==
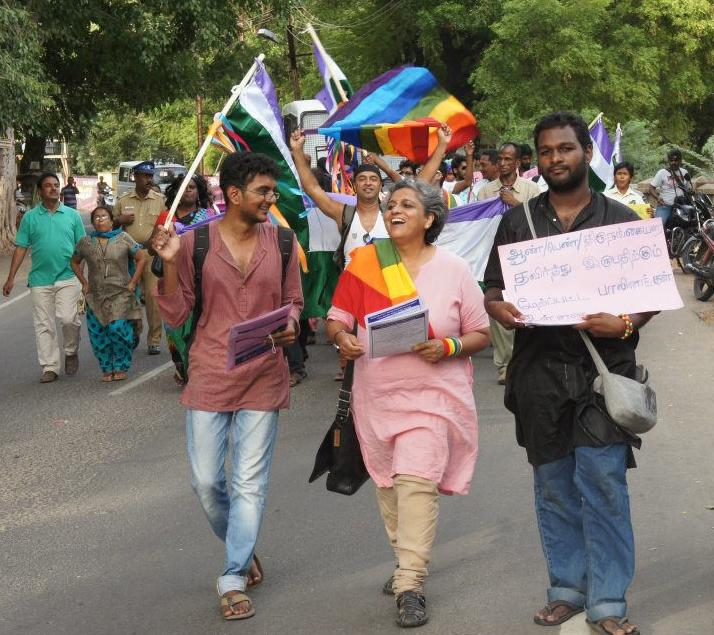
Anjali Gopalan and Gopi Shankar Madurai inaugurating Asia's first Genderqueer Pride Parade at Madurai with a rainbow and genderqueer flag

Many flags have been used in non-binary and genderqueer communities to represent various identities. There are distinct non-binary and genderqueer pride flags. The genderqueer pride flag was designed in 2011 by Marilyn Roxie. Lavender represents androgyny or queerness, white represents agender identity, and green represents those whose identities which are defined outside the binary. The non-binary pride flag was created in 2014 by Kye Rowan. Yellow represents people whose gender exists outside the binary, purple represents those whose gender is a mixture of—or between—male and female, black represents people who have no gender, and white represents those who embrace many or all genders.

Several symbols have been proposed for non-binary people, to complement the Mars symbol for men and Venus symbol for women. One popular symbol is a circle with a stem above it, crossed by an X, in reference to the use of Xs as a gender marker for non-binary people.

Genderfluid people, who fall under the genderqueer umbrella, also have their own flag. Pink represents femininity, white represents lack of gender, purple represents mixed gender or androgyny, black represents all other genders, and blue represents masculinity.

Agender people, who also sometimes identify as genderqueer, have their own flag. This flag uses black and white stripes to represent an absence of gender, and a green stripe to represent non-binary genders.

International Non-Binary People's Day is celebrated on July 14. Other observances with non-binary participation include International Transgender Day of Visibility, observed on March 31, and International Day Against Homophobia, Biphobia, and Transphobia, observed on May 17.

Transgender pride flag, in which white represents non-binary people

Agender pride flag

Bigender pride flag

Genderfluid pride flag

Genderqueer pride flag

Non-binary flag

Trigender pride flag

Pangender pride flag

Non-binary gender symbol

Agender symbol

Genderfluid symbol

== Population figures ==
=== Argentina ===
According to provisional results from Argentina's 2022 national census, 8,293 people (about 0.018% of the total population) identified as non-binary.

=== Brazil ===
A 2021 representative survey estimated that about 1.19% of Brazilian adults identify as non-binary. This corresponds to roughly 1.9 million adults at the time of the survey.

=== Canada ===
Statistics Canada reported that in the 2021 Census, 41,355 Canadians aged 15 or older (about 0.14% of that age group) identified as non-binary.

=== Mexico ===
In 2024, the Williams Institute reported 340,620 Mexicans aged 15 or older identified as non-binary. This corresponds to roughly 0.26% of the population.

=== Switzerland ===
A nationwide survey conducted in late 2021 found that roughly 0.4% of Swiss adults described themselves as non-binary.

=== United Kingdom ===
According to the 2021 census (England and Wales), 30,000 people identified as non-binary, about 0.06% of the population.

=== United States ===
Recent U.S. surveys suggest roughly 1–2% of American adults identify as non-binary. For example, a 2024 Gallup poll found between 1% and 2% of U.S. adults reported a non-binary gender identity.

A 2021 study conducted by the Williams Institute estimated the sexual orientation of non-binary adults in the United States. About 31% identify as queer, 17% bisexual, 17% pansexual, 14% on the asexual spectrum, 10% gay, 6% lesbian, 3% same-gender loving, and 2% another identity.

== See also ==
- Genderqueer fashion
- Gender neutrality
  - Gender-neutral language
    - Gender neutrality in languages with grammatical gender
    - Gender neutrality in genderless languages
    - Gender neutrality in English
    - Gender marking in job titles
    - Gender-specific and gender-neutral pronouns
- Gender transitioning
- Gender variance
- Include Mx
- List of fictional non-binary characters
- List of people with non-binary gender identities
- Postgenderism
