= Mx. =

Gender-neutral honorific title

Mx. (American English) or Mx (British English; /mɪks/ or /məks/) is an English-language neologistic honorific that does not indicate gender. Created as an alternative to gendered honorifics (such as Mr. and Ms.) in the late 1970s, it is used by non-binary people and people who do not wish to imply a gender in their titles.

== Etymology ==
The word was first proposed in the late 1970s. The x is intended to stand as a wildcard character, and does not necessarily imply a "mixed" gender.

== Usage ==
In 2015, Mx. was included in a New York Times article about Bluestockings. Its casual usage in the paper was picked up by popular news sites and blogs. The Times's standards editor Phil Corbett later responded to the usage of the title. Later the same year, Mx. was included in the Oxford English Dictionary.

In December 2020, the Provincial Court of British Columbia, Canada issued guidance to lawyers and litigants about court introductions, calling for court participants, when introducing themselves, to state the pronouns and courtesy title that should be used for them. "Mx." was one of the titles that participants were invited to use.

Although Mx. remains uncommon in the United States, in April 2016 it was added to the Merriam-Webster Unabridged Dictionary.

Indian airlines Vistara and AirAsia India, both Tata Group companies, added Mx. as a third option for passengers booking flights from June 2022.

In 2025, Donald Trump ordered federal agencies in the United States to limit or avoid several words and expressions, Mx. included.

=== United Kingdom ===
In 2013, Brighton and Hove City Council in Sussex, England, voted to allow the use of Mx. on council forms, and in 2014 the Royal Bank of Scotland included the title as an option for customers. In 2015, recognition spread more broadly across UK institutions, including the Royal Mail, government agencies responsible for documents such as driving licenses, most major banks, several other companies, and UK charity Battersea Dogs & Cats Home.

The title is now accepted by the Department for Work and Pensions, HM Revenue and Customs, the National Health Service and many councils, universities, insurance companies and utility retailers in the United Kingdom. The House of Commons of the United Kingdom confirmed in 2015 that it would accept the use of Mx. by MPs.

In 2016, Metro Bank became the first bank in the United Kingdom to offer Mx. on its forms (though other banks had amended records to Mx. on request prior to this). In 2017, banks of the HSBC Group announced the addition of Mx. alongside several other gender-neutral titles as options for their customers. HSBC's 30 March announcement coincided with the International Transgender Day of Visibility, celebrated the following day.

In March 2021, Oscar Davies, a non-binary barrister from the United Kingdom, became the first person to use Mx. (instead of Mr./Ms.) on the board of their chambers.

== Pronunciation ==
An informal study in 2023 found that 68% of 2,426 participants worldwide who use the title pronounced it /mɪks/, while 24% pronounced it /məks/. Mixter is sometimes treated as a long form of the title (like Mister is of Mr).

== See also ==
- Accidental gap § Semantic gaps
- Gender neutrality in English
- Include Mx
- Latinx
