= LGBTQ rights in Sergipe =

LGBTQ rights in a state of Brazil

- Legal status: Legal since 1830, age of consent equalised
- Gender identity: Gender change allowed, official standard for altering legal sex doesn't require surgery since 2018
- Military: Allowed to serve openly
- Discrimination protections: Yes, since 1989 for sexual orientation; since 2019 for gender identity

Family rights
- Recognition of relationships: Same-sex marriage since 2012
- Adoption: Legal since 2010

Lesbian, gay, bisexual, transgender and queer (LGBTQ) people in the Brazilian state of Sergipe enjoy many of the same legal protections available to non-LGBTQ people. Homosexuality is legal in the state.

== Recognition of same-sex unions ==
On 5 July 2012, Brazilian State's Judiciary Power of Sergipe issued "Provimento nº 06/2012" regulating same-sex marriage throughout the state.

== Laws against discrimination ==
Sergipe was among the first states in Brazil to enact a state constitution banning discrimination on the basis of sexual orientation, doing so in 1989 alongside Mato Grosso do Sul. In 2019, discrimination based on gender identity was banned through a decision by the Supreme Federal Court.

On 17 December 2025, Sergipe became the first Brazilian state to prohibit discrimination based on gender identity in its constitution, through Constitutional Amendment No. 59, proposed by state representative Linda Brasil (PSOL).

== Gender identity and expression ==
The Supreme Federal Court of Brazil ruled on 1 March 2018, that a transgender person has the right to change their official name and sex without the need of surgery or professional evaluation, just by self-declaration of their psychosocial identity.

Since 2025, Sergipe has allowed individuals to change their gender marker on documents to "non-binary".

On 28 August 2025, the Court of Justice of Sergipe announced that it would install gender-neutral restrooms in the courthouse.

On 17 November 2025, the Federal University of Sergipe approved the creation of affirmative action quotas for trans people.

== Education ==
On 1 December 2020, state representative Rodrigo Valadares (UNIÃO) introduced a bill to prohibit gender-neutral language in state schools.
