= LGBTQ rights in Brazil =

- Brazil
- Legal status: Legal since 1830, age of consent equal
- Gender identity: Gender change allowed, surgery not required since 2018
- Military: All LGBT people are allowed to serve openly
- Discrimination protections: Explicit legal protections nationwide on the basis of sexual orientation and gender identity since 2019

Family rights
- Recognition of relationships: Same-sex marriage legal nationwide since 2013
- Adoption: Starting in 2010; Full adoption rights since 2015

Brazilian pride flag

Lesbian, gay, bisexual, transgender, and queer (LGBTQ) rights in Brazil rank among the highest in the world. Same-sex couples in Brazil have enjoyed the same rights guaranteed to heterosexual ones since May 16, 2013, including marriage and adoption. On June 13, 2019, the Brazilian Supreme Court ruled that discrimination on the basis of sexual orientation and gender identity is a crime akin to racism.

On May 5, 2011, the Supreme Federal Court voted in favor of granting same-sex couples the same 112 legal rights as couples in stable union. The decision was approved by a 10–0 vote with one abstention – one justice abstained because he had spoken publicly in favor of same-sex unions when he was attorney general. The ruling gave same-sex couples in stable unions the same financial and social rights enjoyed by those in opposite-sex relationships. On October 25, the Superior Court of Justice ruled that two women can legally marry. Differently from the U.S. Supreme Court's "stare decisis", the Superior Court decision would only reach the authors of the demand, but stood as a precedent that could be followed in similar cases. It was the highest court in Brazil to uphold a same-sex marriage. This overturned two lower courts' rulings against the women. The Court ruled that the Brazilian Constitution guarantees same-sex couples the right to marry and that the current Civil Code does not prohibit the marriage of two people of the same sex.

In 2019, the Brazilian Supreme Federal Court ruled that discrimination and violence on the basis of sexual orientation and gender identity constitute a crime equivalent to racism under the Law 7.716/1989, making homophobia and transphobia punishable by imprisonment and fines.

These decisions paved the way for future legalization on same-sex matrimonial rights. Consequently, on May 14, 2013, the National Council of Justice legalized same-sex marriage in the entire country in a 14–1 vote by issuing a ruling that orders all civil registers of the country to license and perform same-sex marriages and convert any existing stable unions into marriages if the couples so desire. Joaquim Barbosa, then president of the Council of Justice and the Supreme Federal Court, said in the decision that notaries cannot continue to refuse to "licensing and performance of a civil marriage or the conversion of a stable union into a marriage between two people of the same sex". The ruling was published on May 15 and took effect on May 16, 2013.

The status of LGBTQ rights in Brazil has expanded since the end of the military dictatorship in 1985, and the creation of the new Constitution of Brazil of 1988.

== Timeline of LGBTQ history in Brazil ==
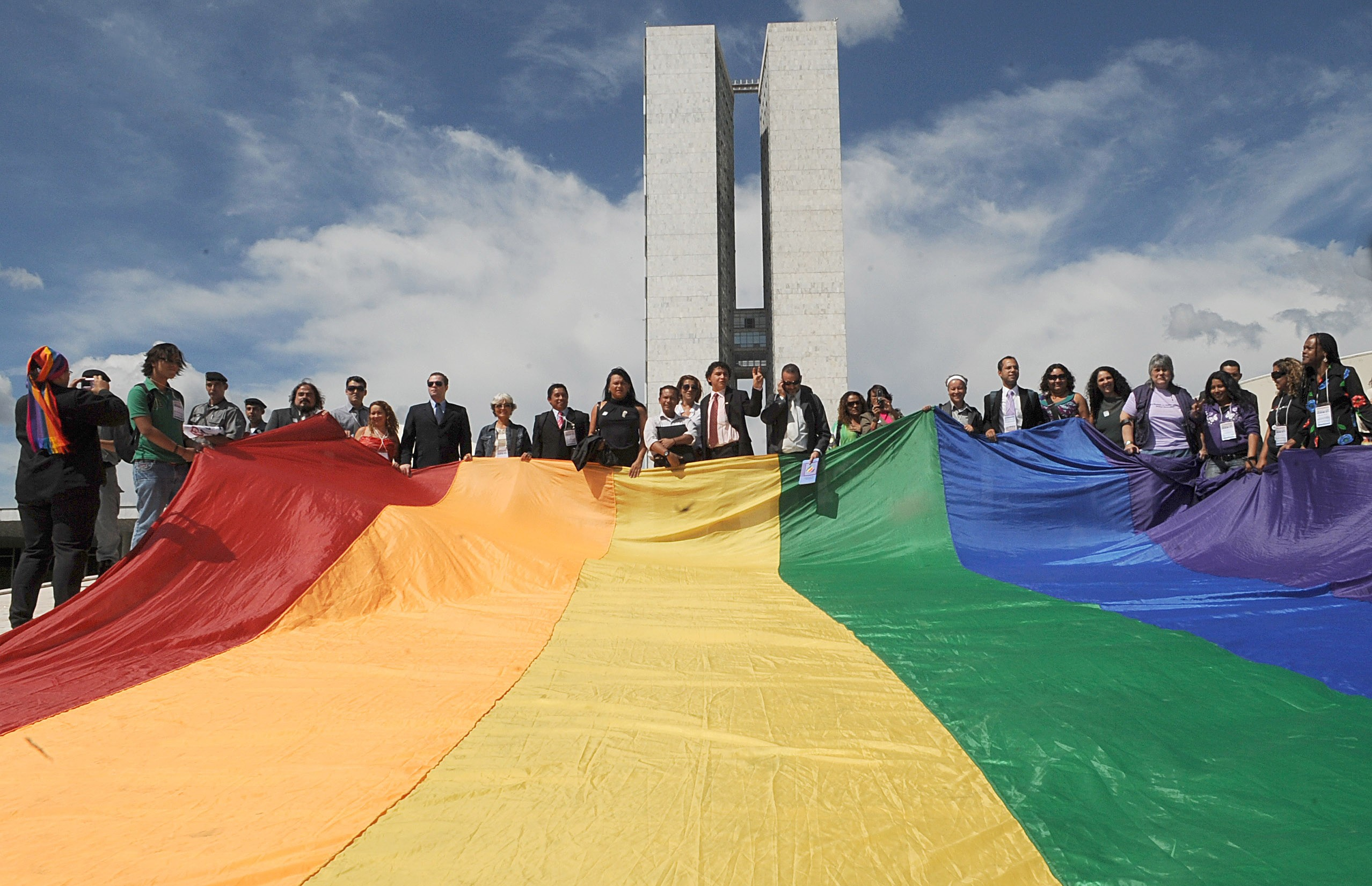
Protest in front of the National Congress of Brazil in Brasília

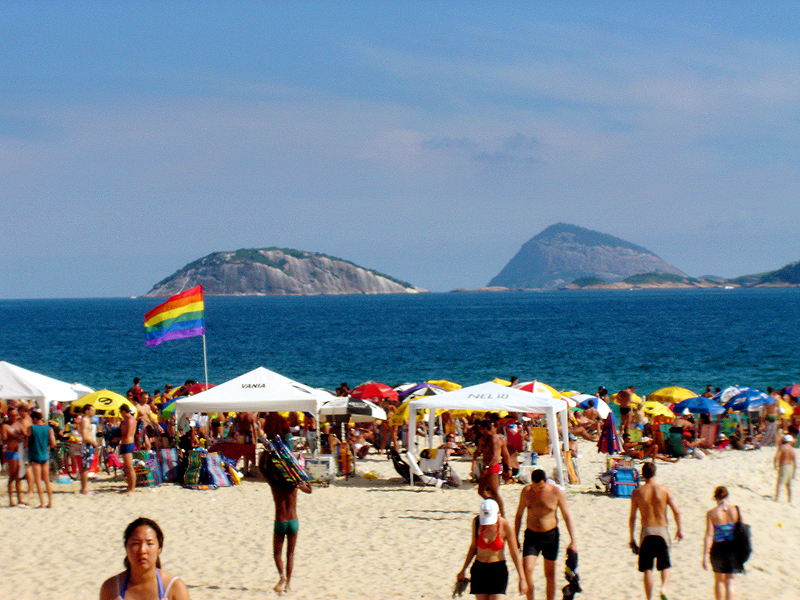
LGBTQ part of Ipanema Beach in Rio de Janeiro

- 1830: Dom Pedro I signed into law the Imperial Penal Code. It eliminated all references to sodomy.
- 1971: Dr. Roberto Farina performs the first male-to-female gender affirming surgery in Brazil. He would be subsequently tried and acquitted for the treatment.
- 1979: O Lampião da Esquina, a gay magazine, with contributions by many famous authors, like João Silvério Trevisan, Aguinaldo Silva and Luiz Mott, was launched. It survived for just a year.
- 1980: Grupo Gay da Bahia, the oldest gay rights organization in Brazil, was founded in the city of Salvador, together with SOMOS, another organization in the city of São Paulo.
- 1983: Uprising at Ferro's Bar when its lesbian clientele was denied entrance. This led to the 19th of August being recognised as National Day of Lesbian Pride.
- 1989: The constitutions of Mato Grosso and Sergipe states are signed into law. They explicitly forbid discrimination on the ground of sexual orientation.
- 1995: Congresswoman Marta Suplicy proposed Bill project No. 1151 concerning civil unions.
- 1995: Brazil's first pride parade on Copacabana Beach in Rio de Janeiro
- 1997: G Magazine, the first gay-oriented erotic magazine, was published enjoying large and national distribution until its final issue in 2013.
- 2004: Rio Grande do Sul began allowing same-sex partners to register stable unions in a generic civil law notary after a court decision in March 2004.
- 2006: A lesbian couple from Rio Grande do Sul was the first to successfully adopt.
- October, 2006: Fashion designer and television presenter Clodovil Hernandes became the first openly gay person to be elected as a congressman in Brazil, with 494,000 votes.
- June 10, 2007: In its eleventh edition, the São Paulo Gay Pride Parade broke its own record as the biggest parade in the world and attracted 3.5 million people.
- June 25, 2007: The Richarlyson affair occurred in which a judge was brought before the Justice Council of São Paulo for stating in court that soccer is a "virile, masculine sport and not a homosexual one." However, afterwards, the same judge apologized and decided to annul the decision he wrote.
- 2008: A national LGBTQ conference was held. The event, the first in the world to be organized by a government, was a result of demands made by civil society and the Brazilian Government's support of LGBTQ rights.
- 2010: Presidential Decree Nº 7.388 of Luiz Inácio Lula da Silva and Human Rights Secretary Paulo Vannuchi establishes the National Council for Combating Discrimination and Promoting the Rights of Lesbians, Gays, Bisexuals, Transvestites and Transsexuals (CNCD/LGBT).
- 2011: On May 5, the Supreme Federal Court unanimously extended stable unions (Portuguese: união estável) to same-sex couples nationwide by redefining the laic definition of the family and providing 112 rights to these couples. This decision paved the way for future legalization on same-sex matrimonial rights.
- 2011: On June 27, the first same-sex stable union was converted into a same-sex marriage in Brazil. The conversion was ordered by a São Paulo judge. Since this case, many other stable unions have been converted into full marriages.
- 2011: On October 25, the Superior Court of Justice ruled that two women can legally marry. Differently from the U.S. Supreme Court's "stare decisis", the Superior Court decision would only reach the authors of the demand, but stood as a precedent that could be followed in similar cases. It's the highest court in Brazil to uphold a same-sex marriage. It overturned two lower courts' rulings against the women. The Court ruled that the Constitution guarantees same-sex couples the right to marry and that the current Civil Code does not prohibit the marriage of two people of the same sex. This decision paved the way for future legalization on same-sex matrimonial rights.
- 2013: On May 14, the Justice's National Council of Brazil legalized same-sex marriage in the entire country in a 14–1 vote by issuing a ruling that orders all civil registers of the country to license and perform same-sex marriages and convert any existing stable unions into marriages if such a couple desires.
- 2015: In March 2015, Supreme Court Justice Cármen Lúcia ruled that same-sex couples can adopt children.
- 2018: On March 1, the Brazilian Supreme Court ruled that transgender people may change their legal gender without undergoing surgery, hormonal therapy or receiving a medical diagnosis.
- 2018: In October, following the 2018 Brazilian general election, Fabiano Contarato was elected as the country's first openly gay senator and Érica Malunguinho as the first trans woman state representative.
- 2019: On February 1, David Miranda, a black gay representative, replaced Jean Wyllys, as Wyllys announced in January 2019 that he had left the country due to death threats. This was the first time that a gay representative was replaced by another gay representative in Brazil.
- 2019: On June 13, the Brazilian Supreme Court ruled that discrimination on the basis of sexual orientation and gender identity is a crime akin to racism.
- 2020: Supreme Court permits MSM to donate blood with no deferral period.
- 2021: A rule of the National Council of Justice allows to register intersex children with the ignored sex on birth certificates.
- 2022: In October, following the 2022 Brazilian general election, Duda Salabert and Erika Hilton were elected as the country's first transgender women federal representatives. Robeyoncé Lima also received more than 80.000 votes and was almost elected the country's first black transgender woman federal representative in the state of Pernambuco.
- 2023: The CNCD/LGBT is re-established by Lula as a 38-member body under the Ministry of Human Rights and Citizenship. Symmy Larrat is appointed as the first National Secretary for the Promotion and Defense of the Rights of LGBTQIA+ People under the Ministry.
- 2024: The Supreme Federal Court ruled that public and private schools must fight discrimination based on sexual orientation and gender identity and sexist bullying (against cisgender and transgender girls) and homotransphobic (against gays, lesbians, bisexuals and transgender people).
- 2025: The Superior Court of Justice decided that it is possible to rectify the civil registry to include the neutral gender. The Superior Court's decision only affects the plaintiff, but serves as a precedent that can be followed in similar cases.

== Recognition of same-sex relationships ==
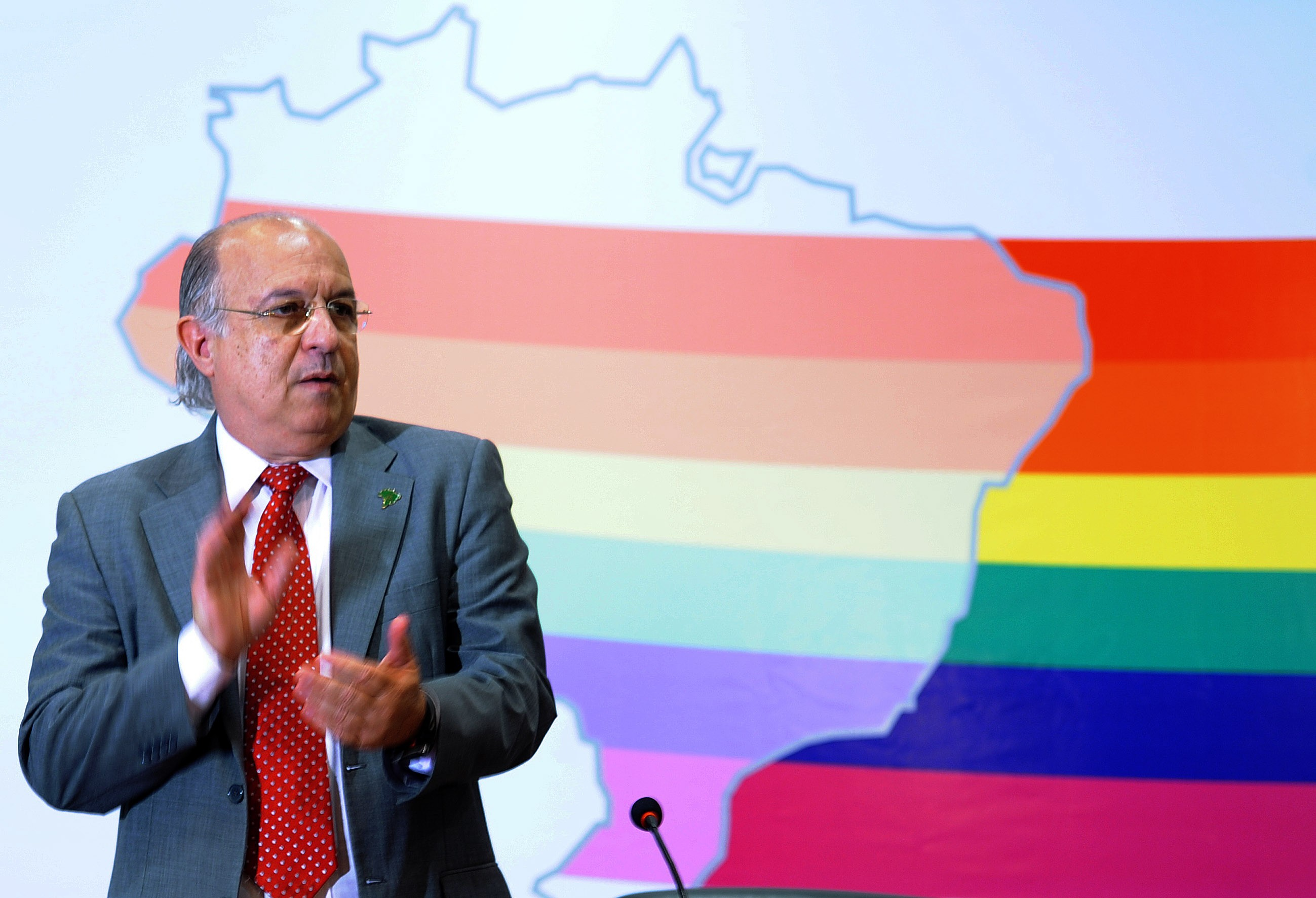
Paulo Vannuchi, Minister of the Special Secretariat for Human Rights, promoting LGBT rights in March 2009

On October 25, 2011, the Superior Court of Justice ruled that two women can legally marry. Differently from the U.S. Supreme Court's "stare decisis", the Superior Court decision would only reach the authors of the demand, but stood as a precedent that could be followed in similar cases. It's the highest court in Brazil to uphold a same-sex marriage. It overturned two lower courts' rulings against the women. The Court ruled that the Constitution guarantees same-sex couples the right to marry and that the current Civil Code does not prohibit the marriage of two people of the same sex. This decision paved the way for future legalization on same-sex matrimonial rights.

Consequently, on May 14, 2013, the Justice's National Council of Brazil legalized same-sex marriage (Portuguese: casamento homoafetivo [kazɐˈmẽtu õmu.afeˈtʃivu], also commonly casamento gay, casamento igualitário [iɡwaliˈtaɾi.u]) in the entire country in a 14–1 vote by issuing a ruling that orders all civil registers of the country to license and perform same-sex marriages and convert any existing stable unions into marriages if such a couple desires. Joaquim Barbosa, president of the Council of Justice and the highest court of constitutional law in Brazil - the Supreme Federal Court - said in the decision that notaries cannot continue to refuse to "licensing and performance of a civil marriage or the conversion of a stable union into a marriage between two people of the same sex".

On December 16, 2003, Brazil announced that it would recognize legal same-sex unions that were performed abroad. It was the first legal action to the recognition of same-sex couples.

According to the Grupo Gay da Bahia (Gay Group of Bahia; GGB), the Instituto Nacional de Segurança Social (National Institute of Social Security; INSS) recognizes stable unions as a means for sharing inheritance, receiving a pension, and other rights similar to marriage.

Many Brazilian cities have also instituted a Register of Homosexual Stable Union. In 2009, one of the offices of the city of São Paulo recorded 202 same-sex stable unions. Stable unions grant many legal rights, such as the right to be recognized as a couple in legal issues, common ownership of property acquired jointly, including transmittance and inheritance, recognition of the partner as a dependent at the National Institute of Social Security, on health plans and with insurers. Also included is the right to transfer the bank account of one partner to another in case of death or illness of the holder.

De facto unions may be registered at a civil law notary throughout the country (there are specific ordinances about it in Rio Grande do Sul, Roraima and Piauí, but the right is federal and registration is possible in others places too).

Prior to the nationwide legalisation of same-sex marriage, several binational same-sex couples won the right to live permanently in Brazil. One such case is the case of a binational couple who was forced to leave Brazil and move to Chicago so they could live together. U.S. citizen Chris Bohlander won the right to live permanently in Brazil with his partner Zemir Magalhães. The couple left Chicago three years prior to live together in Goiânia. A Brazilian judge allowed Bohlander to obtain a permanent residency visa, which is normally only given to the foreign spouse of a Brazilian, based on their stable union, which was recognized by a Goiás judge in 2008. In Brazil, the couple's victory was seen as important especially because the ruling is based on the fundamental rights and protections guaranteed under the country's Constitution.

=== Same-sex couple rights ===
A bill was proposed in National Congress of Brazil in 1995 to change federal law and allow the recognition of same-sex unions, but it faced strong opposition and was not voted on. Since the late 1990s, however, many concessions have been granted to same-sex couples. Same-sex couples were determined to be de facto partners by the Superior Justice Tribunal in 2006. This gave some rights to same-sex couples through stable unions.

Many independent judicial decisions in Brazil since 1998 have recognized same-sex partnerships in this category under common law and granted various rights to the individuals concerned. There is no actual definition or consensus on what constitutes a stable union. In the state of Rio de Janeiro, the partners of government employees receive the same benefits as married couples. In the state of Rio Grande do Sul in Southern Brazil, judges have determined that same-sex relationships should also be legally recognised. All judges and justices of the peace are now bound to approve stable unions "between persons of sound mind and independent sexual orientation" in the state.

== Catholic Church's Influence ==
The Catholic church has had a prominent influence on the culture within Brazil. Three quarters of the population within Brazil identify as being Catholic. The Catholic church has had a long history of discrimination, specifically when it comes to the LGBTQ community.In the Catholic faith, Pope Francis recently said that “the view that is gender ideology is highly dangerous as it is driven by foreign economic, educational, and legal agendas, which ultimately result in a cultural revolution that undermines human dignity”. On top of this many Catholics in Brazil identify themselves as participants in far-right groups. According to Jay Sosa, "Catholic leaders and Evangelical pastors regularly spoke out against PLC 122 in the press".PLC 122 was an anti-racism law that LGBTQ+ were added to, under the protected class. However, in 2015 the bill failed to pass the Senate in Brazil.

During the 2015 Sao Paulo Pride Parade, Viviany Belebony, a trans woman, was seen mimicking the crucifixion during the parade. She did to call attention to the violence suffered by trans people in Brazil. Catholics and lawmakers were appalled by this.The LGBTQ community argued that lawmakers were only protecting Catholics and their beliefs, through creating a law banning "Cristofiobia".Therefore, because the beliefs of Catholics are protected through this law, tensions continue to grow between the two communities.

Recently, in 2025 in the Brazil Bishop Conference, national bishops appointed one of their members to work with Brazil’s network of Catholic LGBTQ+ groups. Additionally, in 2016 the first ever bishop was appointed to be specifically in charge ensuring equality within the church for LGBTQ+ members in Brazil, this was led by Pope Francis.

== Adoption and parenting ==
Same-sex adoption is legal in Brazil, because Brazilian laws do not specifically prohibit it. Consequently, several judges have given favorable rulings for adoptions by same-sex couples.

In 2010, in a landmark trial, the 4th Class of the Superior Court of Justice of Brazil (STJ) acknowledged, unanimously, that same-sex couples have the right to adopt children. The court, consisting of five judges, discussed a case of two women who had been given the right to adopt by the Federal Court of Rio Grande do Sul. The State Public Prosecutor, however, appealed to the STJ. The court denied the public prosecutor's request, saying that for such cases, the child's will must be respected. "This trial is historic because it gives to human dignity, the dignity of minors and the two women", said the reporter, Luis Felipe Solomon. "We affirm that this decision is an orientation that in cases like that, you should always serve the interests of the child, that is being adopted", the minister João Otávio de Noronha said. The Superior Court of Justice decision creates a legal precedent that allows same-sex couples to apply to adopt and foster children.

For attorney Adriana Galvão, counsellor of the "Ordem dos Advogados do Brasil" (Bar Association of Brazil), and part of the study group of the institution about sexual diversity, the opinion demonstrates a legal and also social advancement. "It was a new interpretation. The Supreme Court found that it can break paradigms and demonstrated that the judiciary is trying to open their vision to our social reality in order to guarantee the rights of people," she said.

In 2010, Minister Marco Aurélio Mello, of the Supremo Tribunal Federal (Supreme Federal Court of Brazil), ruled in favor of a binational English-Brazilian same-sex couple in the state of Paraná, allowing the couple to adopt any child, regardless of the age or sex of the child. The decision of the Supreme Federal Court opens the way for other same-sex couples to receive the same rights in the country.

In March 2024, Brazil's Supreme Court ruled to extend paid paternity leaves, which are five days long, to the non-pregnant mothers from lesbian couples.

== Discrimination protections ==
The states of Brazil are prohibited from creating discriminatory laws, according to the national Constitution. While the Constitution prohibits discrimination on a variety of characteristics, such as "origin, race, sex, colour [and] age", sexual orientation is not explicitly mentioned. The Constitution does forbid "any other forms of discrimination".

Traditional images of Latin America "machismo" and the resulting homophobia are changing now that individual rights, including one's right in accordance with one's sexual orientation, enjoy the protection of the law. Brazil adopted a liberal Constitution in 1988, and continues to provide more protections for all of its citizens. Shortly after electing Luiz Inácio Lula da Silva as Brazil's president, various states took serious measures ensuring that no one would be discriminated against because of their sexual orientation. As of 2003, discrimination on the basis of sexual orientation was prohibited in 73 municipal statutes. Provisions were later enacted in the laws and regulations of the states of Acre (2017), Alagoas (2001/13), Amapá (2009), Amazonas (2006), Bahia (2007/14), the Brazilian Federal District (1997/17), Ceará (2009/14), Espírito Santo (2012/16), Goiás (2008), Mato Grosso (1989/17), Mato Grosso do Sul (2005), Maranhão (2006), Minas Gerais (2002), Pará (2007), Paraíba (2003/17), Paraná (2013), Pernambuco (2012/13), Piauí (2004/17), Rio de Janeiro (2000/10), Rio Grande do Norte (2007), Rio Grande do Sul (2002/16), Rondônia (2018), Roraima (2013), Santa Catarina (2002), São Paulo (2001), Sergipe (1989), and Tocantins (2013). These policies vary by state. Some states (Alagoas, Bahia, the Brazilian Federal District, Ceará, Espírito Santo, Mato Grosso, Pará, Piauí, Santa Catarina, and Sergipe) list sexual orientation among the non-discrimination grounds in their state constitutions. Several states have also established public taskforces and commissions to investigate reports of discrimination. Legal prohibitions of discrimination against transgender people varies from state to state. Many states enacted protections for gender identity at the same time as for sexual orientation, while others did so some years later. As of 2019, Amapá, Minas Gerais, Pará, Santa Catarina and Sergipe do not address discrimination against transgender people.

... the law shall include penalties of an administrative, economic and financial nature for entities that discriminate based on national origin, race, color, sex, age, marital status, religious belief, sexual orientation or political or philosophical beliefs, or any other status, regardless of the judicial measures provided for by law. (Note: Portuguese: ... a lei cominará sanções de natureza administrativa, econômica e financeira a entidades que incorrerem em discriminação por motivo de origem, raça, cor, sexo, idade, estado civil, crença religiosa, orientação sexual ou de convicção política ou filosófica, e de outras quaisquer formas, independentemente das medidas judiciais previstas em lei;)

— Constitution of the State of Santa Catarina (Constituição do Estado de Santa Catarina).

The State and Municipalities shall ensure, within their territory and within the limits of their competence, the fullness and guarantee of the rights and social principles provided for in the Federal Constitution and in the international treaties in force in [Brazil], including those concerning urban, rural workers and public servants, as well as the prohibition of discrimination based on religious belief or sexual orientation. (Note: Portuguese: O Estado e os Municípios assegurarão, em seu território e nos limites de sua competência, a plenitude e a inviolabilidade dos direitos e garantias sociais e princípios previstos na Constituição Federal e nos tratados internacionais vigentes em nossa Pátria, inclusive as concernentes aos trabalhadores urbanos, rurais e servidores públicos, bem como os da vedação de discriminação por motivo de crença religiosa ou orientação sexual.)

— Constitution of the State of Espírito Santo (Constituição do Estado do Espírito Santo).

No one shall be discriminated against or harmed by reason of birth, age, ethnicity, race, color, sex, genetic characteristics, marital status, rural or urban work, religion, political or philosophical beliefs, sexual orientation, physical, immunological, sensory or mental disability, in accordance with the Federal Constitution. (Note: Portuguese: Ninguém será discriminado ou prejudicado em razão de nascimento, idade, etnia, raça, cor, sexo, características genéticas, estado civil, trabalho rural ou urbano, religião, convicções políticas ou filosóficas, orientação sexual, deficiência física, imunológica, sensorial ou mental, por ter cumprido pena, nem por qualquer particularidade ou condição, observada a Constituição Federal.)

— Organic Law of the Federal District (Lei Orgânica do Distrito Federal)

On November 30, 2000, the City Council of Niterói, in the state of Rio de Janeiro, passed an ordinance prohibiting discrimination based on sexual orientation in public places and institutions as well as in businesses. Many Brazilian cities and states have anti-discriminatory legislation that explicitly includes sexual orientation. Some of them provide specific sanctions and penalties for those who engage in discrimination.

In 2007, the Ministry of Labour and Employment issued Executive Order (Portaria) No. 41/2007, which prohibits employers from requesting documents or information related to an employee's sexuality.

A 2008 survey found that 70% of Brazilians were in favour of banning discrimination against LGBTQ people. Divided by religion, 54% of Evangelicals supported banning such discrimination, while 70% of Catholics and 79% of atheists also expressed support. Those aged between 16 and 30 were also more likely to support legislation to ban LGBTQ discrimination.

As of 2019, a federal anti-discrimination law is pending approval on the Brazilian Senate. The Constitution does not have any specific laws on discrimination based on sexual orientation, but it does have a generic anti-discrimination article that can be considered to include such cases. This fact is constantly used by the opposition of the anti-discrimination law to show that there is no need for specific laws. The defenders of the new law, however, argue that without clear designation, this will still be considered somewhat of a lesser crime. Some conservative Catholic and Protestant senators argue that the law would be an aggression on religious freedom granted by the Constitution. Senator Fátima Cleide (PT–RO) said that the law should be approved because "the country has the tragic mark that a homosexual is murdered every two days." Former Evangelical priest and Senator Marcelo Crivella (PRB–RJ) criticized the text, saying homosexuals will receive a protection that "should have been given to women, the elderly and children." In March 2018, the Senate Constitution and Justice Commission approved the federal anti-discrimination law. The bill would need to be approved by the full Senate and Chamber of Deputies before becoming law.

In February 2019, the Federal Supreme Court (Supremo Tribunal Federal) began proceedings to criminalize homophobia and transphobia. The court handed down its ruling on May 23, criminalizing homophobia and transphobia under the country's anti-racism law (Portuguese: Lei do Crime Racial - Lei n.º 7.716/1989). Six of the Supreme Court's 11 judges voted in favor of the measure, while the five other judges were granted more time to make their decision. Eventually, on 13 June, the Supreme Court issued its final ruling, in an 8–3 vote. Judge Luiz Fux described homophobic crimes as "alarming" and an "epidemic".

On February 27, 2025, the Supreme Federal Court ruled that the Maria da Penha Law can also be applied to transgender women and male same-sex couples.

In July 2026, the Chamber of Deputies' Committee on Human Rights, Minorities, and Racial Equality approved a bill to criminalize transphobia in the country. The bill proposes a 30-year prison sentence for cases of transphobia resulting in death.

=== In schools ===
Multiple colleges, universities and schools have established guidelines and policies regarding LGBTQ students. These include, among others, preventing and prohibiting bullying, creating support programmes and using a transgender student's preferred name. The 2004 government initiative, Brasil Sem Homophobia, seeks to further protect LGBTQ students from discrimination.

Since 2020, the Supreme Federal Court has been overturning state and municipal laws which banned "gender and sexuality courses" in schools.

Since 2023, the Supreme Federal Court has been overturning state and municipal laws which decree banning the use of gender-neutral language by schools.

On August 21, 2023, the Supreme Federal Court ruled 9–1 that anti-LGBTQ hate speech is equivalent to the crime of racial insult.

In June 2024, the Supreme Federal Court ruled that public and private schools must fight discrimination based on sexual orientation and gender identity and sexist bullying (against cisgender and transgender girls) and homotransphobic (against gays, lesbians, bisexuals and transgender people).

== Gender identity and expression ==
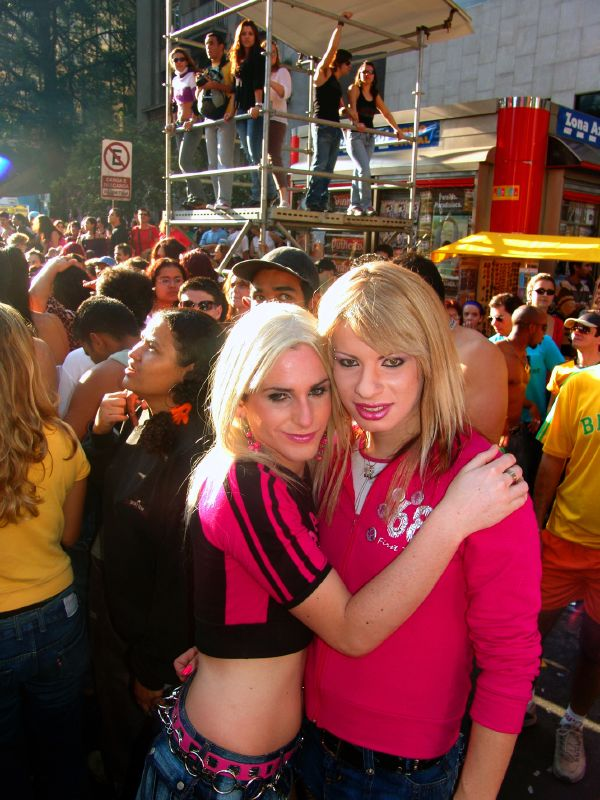
Brazilian travestis

The term transgender as used in the United States and Europe also encompasses all gender-variant individuals in Brazil. Transfeminine people in Brazil generally fall into two categories: "travestis" and transsexuals, although for Brazilians the two terms are interchangeable. Travesti, as a social marker, started to be used as a way to define transfeminine people across Latin American countries before the spread of contemporary terms. The word also used to have a pejorative nuance when used, but the term has been reclaimed and appropriated by the Latin American transgender community. Nowadays, travesti is considered a gender identity for people assigned male at birth that express femininity. Therefore, travestis are considered transgender.

The formal labor market is largely closed to transgender people. An extremely small minority of travestis have university educations or professional qualifications. With few exceptions, the only professions open to them are nursing, domestic service, hairdressing, gay entertainment, and prostitution. In some cases, even those who work as hairdressers, gay nightclub artists and domestic servants also double as sex workers. In the central, north and northeastern regions of Brazil, transgender people from extremely poor families sometimes begin working as prostitutes as early as 12 years of age, especially if they have been expelled from home by their families.

In the south and southeastern regions and in the major capitals, such as São Paulo and Rio de Janeiro, it is common to find travestis as young as 16 or 17 working in the streets. Despite being included in Brazil's acronym in the struggle for LGBT rights, transgender people receive little outreach from the more mainstream gay and lesbian groups. There are, however, associations of transgender people in several Brazilian states and cities. One program in Rio de Janeiro focuses on the reintegration of travestis into society through training and employment opportunities.

Brazil's public health system provides free sex reassignment surgery. Federal prosecutors from the state of Rio Grande do Sul had argued that sex reassignment surgery is covered under a constitutional clause guaranteeing medical care as a basic right. In 2007, the 4th Regional Federal Court agreed, saying in its ruling that "from the biomedical perspective, transsexuality can be described as a sexual identity disturbance where individuals need to change their sexual designation or face serious consequences in their lives, including intense suffering, mutilation and suicide." The Health Ministry said it would be up to local health officials to decide who qualifies for the surgery and what priority it will be given compared with other operations within the public health system. Patients must be at least 21 years old and diagnosed as transsexuals with no personality disorders and must undergo a psychological evaluation for at least two years, the ministry said. Gay activists applauded the decision. So far, the measure has not prompted any opposition. Brazil's public health system offers free health care to all Brazilians, including a variety of surgeries and free AIDS medication. But long lines and poorly equipped facilities mean that those who can afford it usually choose to pay for private hospitals and clinics. The Health Ministry said that since 2000 through 2007, about 250 sex reassignment surgeries had been performed at three university hospitals.

In July 2026, the 3rd Panel of the Superior Court of Justice ruled that health insurance plans are obligated to cover facial feminization surgeries.

=== March 2018 rulings ===
Two landmark transgender rights rulings were handed down on 1 March 2018. First, the Superior Electoral Court ruled that transgender people may run in an election under their preferred name. Transgender advocates hailed the decision, as elections were held in October 2018. Second, the Brazilian Supreme Court unanimously ruled that transgender people may change their legal gender without undergoing surgery or hormonal therapy, which were previously requirements. A transgender individual seeking to change their gender to reflect their gender identity can now simply apply to do so at a registry post in the country, without the need of a judicial document or any medical report.

=== Healthcare ban ===
In April 2025, Brazil's Federal Council of Medicine (CFM) passed a resolution banning gender-affirming care for minors, but reduced the age for gender affirming surgical procedures from 25 to 21. As justification for the latter, the CFM cited a new law passed in 2022, which lowered the minimum age limit for sterilization procedures such as tubal ligation and vasectomies in the country from 25 to 21. A few days later, LGBTQ+ advocates filed an ADI (Direct Action of Unconstitutionality) to the Supreme Court in an attempt to get the ban on gender-affirming care for minors overturned.

On July 25, 2025, the Federal Court of Acre blocked the Federal Council of Medicine's resolution, restoring gender-affirming care for minors nationwide.

On October 2, 2025, Supreme Court Justice Flávio Dino overturned the Court's decision and reinstated the resolution.

=== Non-binary gender ===
==== Federal ====
There is no recognition of a third gender option nationwide, but since 2020 non-binary and intersex people have been getting court authorizations to register their sex as "unspecified", "non-identified", "intersex", or "non-binary" in the civil registry. On 6 May 2025, the Superior Court of Justice decided that it is possible to rectify the civil registry to include the neutral gender. The Superior Court's decision only affects the plaintiff, but serves as a precedent that can be followed in similar cases.

For the purpose of filling out and printing the Identity Card, the gender field must follow the ICAO standardization, with 1 character, M, F or X (for non-binary people). Since January 11, 2024, issuing bodies in the States and the Federal District have been obliged to adopt these Identity Card standards established by the Federal Government. The information in the gender field can be self-determined and self-declared by the person when filling in the data, at the Identification Institutes.

While requesting a new passport, Brazilians are able to select an unspecified sex. Following the international standard, the "unspecified" option is represented in the passport with the letter X, instead of the letters M or F, for male or female, respectively. The gender option contained in the passport must reflect the information expressed in the birth certificate or other official identification document. I.e, whenever the information expressed on the certificate is different from "male" or "female", the alternative will be used. The use of option X, or "not specified", comes from the international standard ICAO (International Civil Aviation Organization), which specifies the printing of the "Gender of the holder" by "use of the initial letter commonly used in the country of origin", being "capital letter F for feminine, M for masculine, or X for unspecified".

==== By federative unit ====
Non-binary option on birth certificates
| State/District | Recognized? | | Date | Notes |
| State/District | individually | by law | Date | Notes |
| Acre | Yes | Yes | 2025 | Government allowed Ariel Sebastos to rectify their gender. Law allows non-binary people to change, however it requires judicial actions still. |
| Alagoas | Yes | ? | 2021 | Through judicial actions. |
| Amapá | Yes | ? | 2022 | Positive requests are given for non-binary people to rectify their genders. |
| Amazonas | ? | — | | While non-binary people are receiving name change in their documents. But gender options are still binary. |
| Bahia | Yes | Yes | 2022 | Without costs, non-binary people can change name and gender statewidely. |
| Ceará | Yes | — | 2024 | Notaries allowed to grant non-binary registry. Justice acknowledged in 2024. |
| Espírito Santo | Yes | ? | 2024 | Justice is allowing people to rectify non-binarily. |
| Federal District | Yes | Yes | 2022 | Provision recognizes, and it's possible to rectify directly in notaries. |
| Goiás | Yes | — | 2023 | People are receiving positive requests. |
| Maranhão | Yes | issued | 2024 | Public Defender is granting non-binary people their rights. |
| Mato Grosso | ? | — | | |
| Mato Grosso do Sul | ? | — | | |
| Minas Gerais | Yes | ? | 2023 | Interesteds must be of legal age and present a birth certificate, RG, CPF, voter registration card, and proof of address. Registration is free. |
| Pará | Yes | ? | 2025 | Judicial actions allow non-binary legal gender. |
| Paraíba | Yes | Yes | 2023 | Extrajudicial and administrative acts are allowing anyone to change their gender. Provision exists since 2023. |
| Paraná | Yes | rerecognized | 2021 | In 2021, a non-binary person from Foz do Iguaçu changed their sex in civil registry to "indeterminate". Law from 2025 allows registry for sex as "undefined". |
| Pernambuco | Yes | ? | 2023 | Judicial action recognized. |
| Piauí | Yes | ? | 2021 | Judicial recognition. |
| Rio de Janeiro | Yes | —N/a | 2020 | First effective judicial recognition allowing Aoi Berriel to register their gender as non-binary. And since 2022, non-binary people can change to "não binárie", using gender-neutral neologistic desinence. |
| Rio Grande do Norte | Yes | Yes | 2023 | Law from 2023 points individuals can change their gender with no requirements of a reason. |
| Rio Grande do Sul | Yes | revoked | 2021 | Collective actions happen since 2021. Recognized through provision since 2022, the law was revoked in 2023. |
| Rondônia | Yes | ? | 2022 | People can change their gender to non-binary. |
| Roraima | Yes | ? | 2025 | Free action permits trans and non-binary people to rectify. |
| Santa Catarina | Yes | ? | 2020 | People from Santa Catarina and residents are receiving documents constating non-binary gender judicially, or directly in notarial offices, however unprescribed from a specific law. |
| São Paulo | Yes | —N/a | 2021 | 3rd Chamber of Private Law of the TJ/SP authorized the change of the civil registry, favorabilizing the inclusion of the terms "non-binary", "agender", and/or "unspecified" in the "sex" field. |
| Sergipe | Yes | Yes | 2025 | Law recognizes non-binary people. |
| Tocantins | Yes | Yes | 2022 | Judiciary provision allows the exclusion of the female or male gender annotation and the inclusion of the expression "non-binary", upon request of the party at the time of the request. |

=== Sports ===
In August 2026, a federal court dismissed a lawsuit filed by the Association of Women, Mothers, and Workers of Brazil (Matria) that sought to ban trans women from competing in women’s sports.

== Military service ==
There is no law forbidding LGBTQ people from serving in the Brazilian Armed Forces. Sexual orientation and gender identity cannot be an obstacle for entry into the police force or the military in Brazil. All sexual acts are disallowed between members of the forces, be it heterosexual or homosexual.

The Constitution of Brazil prohibits any form of discrimination in the country. The Brazilian Armed Forces do not permit desertion, sexual acts or congeners in the military, whether heterosexual or homosexual. They claim that it is not a homophobic rule, but a rule of discipline that also includes the opposite sex.

In 2008, during a disappearance of a military gay couple, the Ministry of Defence of Brazil spoke: the sergeant is to be questioned about alleged desertion from the military and there is no question of discrimination." The two soldiers said they had been in a stable relationship for ten years in the Brazilian military. In 2012, was published an official note by Brazilian Armed Forces: "The Brazilian army does not discriminate against (...) sexual orientation (...).

Following the Supreme Federal Tribunal decision in favor of stable unions, Defense Minister Nelson Jobim guaranteed the Ministry's compliance with the decision and mentioned that spousal benefits can be accorded to same-sex spouses of military personnel.

According to a survey conducted by the Institute of Applied Economic Research (IPEA) in 2012, 63.7% of Brazilians supported the entry of LGBTQ people in the Brazilian Armed Forces.

The Army announced that the situation of non-binary individuals would be treated in the same manner as that of intersex individuals, so that any Brazilian in the draft cohort who expresses a gender identity other than male and holds a final, unappealable court ruling or a civil registry amendment will be considered exempt from mandatory military service, as they do not meet the requirements set forth in the Federal Constitution, the Military Service Law, its implementing regulations, and the 2024 General Conscription Plan.

On 12 November 2025, the Superior Court of Justice ruled that it is illegal to discharge transgender people from the military after they have begun gender transition and that they also have the right to use their chosen name.

== Conversion therapy ==
Conversion therapy has been forbidden by the Federal Psychology Council since 1999. In September 2017, a federal judge in Brasília approved the use of conversion therapy by a psychologist to "cure" people of homosexuality, overruling the 1999 decision. However, in December 2017, the same judge changed his decision, keeping the "treatment" banned. In April 2019, Supreme Court Justice Cármen Lúcia issued an injunction overturning the judge's decisions. Subsequently, the Federal Supreme Court decided to ban conversion therapy. In January 2018, the Federal Psychology Council established norms of performance for psychologists in relation to transsexuals and travestis, also banning any conversion therapy.

== Blood donation ==
Prior to 2020, under Ministry of Health guidelines, gay and bisexual men were only allowed to donate blood after 12 months without same-sex sexual activity.

However, in May 2020, during the COVID-19 pandemic, the Federal Supreme Court ("Supremo Tribunal Federal") declared the limitation unconstitutional and struck out the restrictions. Consequently, Brazil became one of the first Latin American countries to permit gay and bisexual men to donate blood under terms equal to heterosexual men.

== Population ==
In 2009, a survey conducted by University of São Paulo in ten state capitals, showed that the Brazilian gay male population was of 7.8% and the bisexual male population was 2.6% (total of 10.4% of the total male population). The lesbian population was of 4.9% and the bisexual women another 1.4% (total of 6.3% of the female population).

A 2019 survey conducted by the Brazilian Institute of Geography and Statistics (IBGE), indicated that out of a total of 108.000 households (representing the entire population), 2.9 million Brazilians self-identify as homosexual or bisexual (1.8% of the population aged 18 and over). According to the Guinness World Records, the São Paulo Gay Pride Parade is the world's largest LGBTQ Pride celebration, with 4 million people attending in 2009. Brazil had 60,002 same-sex couples living together and 37,5 million heterosexual couples, according to the 2010 Brazilian Census carried out by IBGE. The country has about 300 active LGBT organizations. According to a 2022 Datafolha survey, the percentage of Brazilians who think homosexuality should be accepted by society had increased from 64% in 2014 to 79% in 2022. However, Brazil is reported to have the highest absolute number of LGBTQ murders, alongside Mexico and the United States, with more than 380 murders in 2017 alone, an increase of 30% compared to 2016. There is strong criticism regarding the methodology behind such figures, and there appears to be no basis for international comparisons, as stated by institutes linked to the LGBTQ+ community itself. That same year, Brazil also reported the highest homicide rate in its history.

In 2010, a survey conducted by Rio de Janeiro State University and University of Campinas revealed that by age of 18, 95% of homosexual youth in Brazil had already revealed their homosexuality, with many acknowledging it by the time they were 16. For the 1980s generation, homosexuality was usually revealed after they were 21 years old. Prejudice had also decreased according to data from a survey of Ibope. The same survey found that 60% of Brazilians considered homosexuality as natural.

The male population of the city of Rio de Janeiro was 19.3% of gays and bisexual males. And the female population of the city of Manaus had 10.2% of lesbians and women bisexuals.

In 2009 survey conducted by Projeto Sexualidade (Prosex) with a total of 8.200 people from 10 state capitals has indicated that 7.8% of the interviewed males identified as gay and 2.6% identified as bisexual. Out of the interviewed females, 4.9% identified as lesbians and bisexual women comprised 1.4%

In 2022, based on data collected by the National Health Survey in 2019, the IBGE estimated that there are 2.9 million gay, lesbian or bisexual Brazilians, representing 1.8% of the population.

=== Proportion of self-reported homosexual or bisexual persons, by U.F. ===
Federation units with the proportion of Brazilians self-reported as homosexual or bisexual greater than the national average:

| Rank | U.F. | Percentage of LGB population |
|---|---|---|
| 1 | Distrito Federal | 2.9% |
| 2 | Amapá | 2.8% |
| 3 | Amazonas | 2.3% |
| 4 | Rio de Janeiro | 2.3% |
| 5 | São Paulo | 2.3% |
| 6 | Paraná | 2.0% |
| 7 | Mato Grosso do Sul | 2.0% |
| 8 | Rondônia | 1.9% |
| 9 | Pará | 1.9% |
| 10 | Rio Grande do Sul | 1.9% |

== LGBT immigration ==
=== To Brazil ===
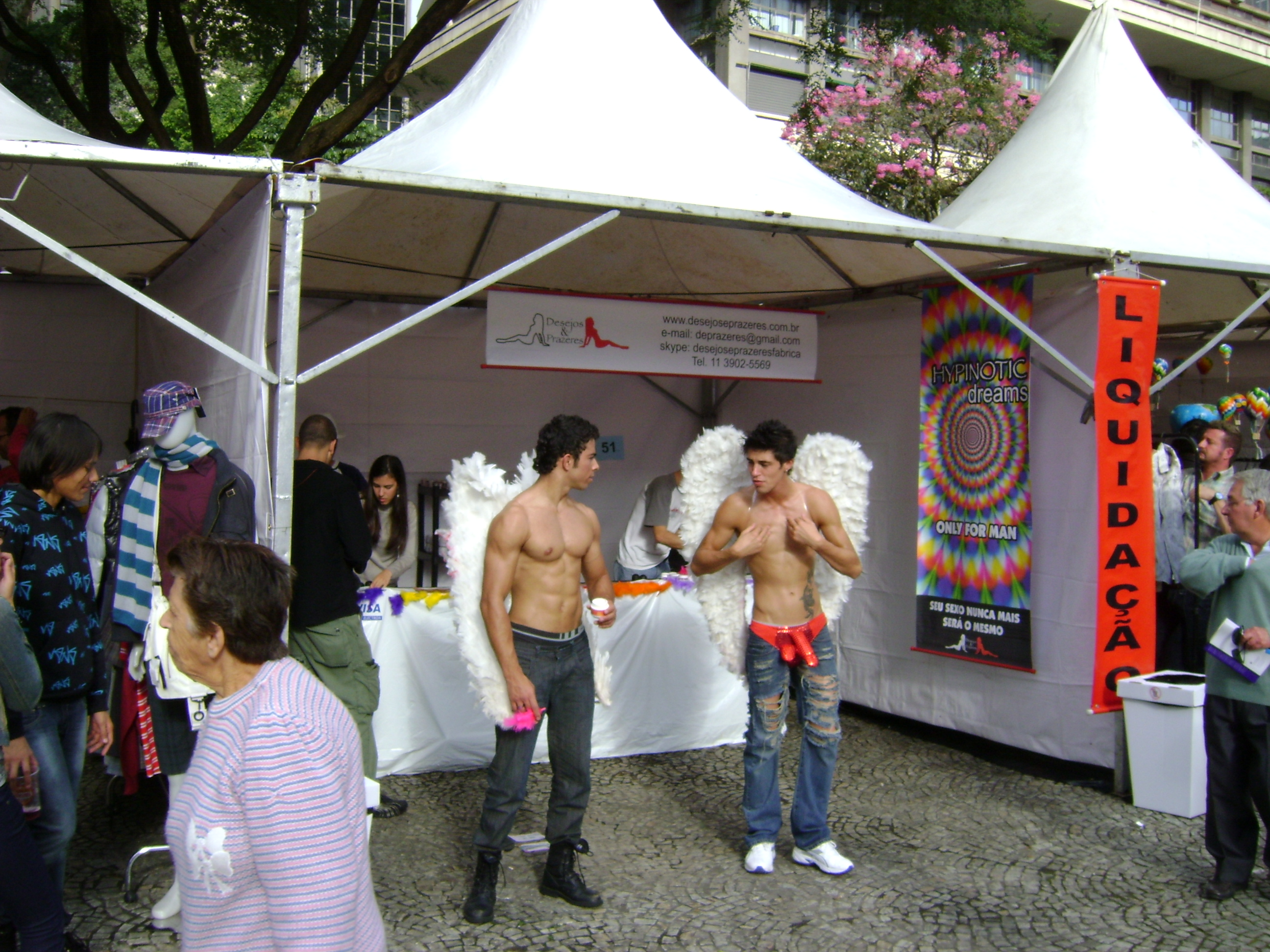
A gay couple, during the Brazilian LGBT Cultural Fair

A watershed decision issued on November 25, 2003, by Brazilian Judge Ana Carolina Morozowski of the 5th Civil Court of Curitiba, Paraná recognized the same-sex relationship of national gay activist Toni Reis with British citizen David Ian Harrad, granting Harrad permanent residency in Brazil. A week later, the National Immigration Council instituted the Administrative Resolution Number 3, 2003, which "disposes of the criteria for the concession of temporary or permanent visa, or of definitive permanence to the male or female partner, without distinction of sex."

In the city of Florianópolis, Judge Marjôrie Cristina Freiberger Ribeiro da Silva of the 1st Civil Court prevented the Brazilian immigration departments from deporting an Italian citizen who had lived more than ten years in a stable relationship with a lesbian Brazilian. The judge said she believed that "homosexual union creates the same rights as a union between man and woman."

Brazil was the first country in Latin America to recognize same-sex unions for immigration benefits. Following Brazil's example, other countries in South America have made major advances in the recognition of same-sex relationships, including immigration rights, for example, Colombia in 2009.

However, the Brazilian Government was slow in cabling its consulates regarding this decision. Thus, many same-sex couples who sought to move to Brazil to take advantage of this new policy were left confused by the lack of clarity by the Government and unable to receive the benefits this policy was intended to provide. In February 2004, in a joint meeting at the Brazilian consulate in New York, Immigration Equality and the Brazilian Rainbow Group asked the consular officials to clarify the application procedures regarding the new immigration policy. Despite ongoing confusion, the Brazilian Rainbow Group obtained copies of Administrative Resolution No. 3 and accompanying regulations that clarify the rules for same-sex binational couples where one partner is a Brazilian citizen.

We are thrilled to report that clear procedures are now available to binational same-sex couples who seek to immigrate to Brazil, says Eryck Duran, Executive Director of the Brazilian Rainbow Group, and he adds: We are proud that Brazilis committed to end discrimination of gays and lesbians as the government has recognized that extending immigration to same-sex partners or spouses of Brazilian citizens is licit and sanctioned by the Constitution.

=== In Brazil ===
Historically, migration by homosexuals from other parts of the country to larger cities has been a common phenomenon, even discounting economic factors in the towns and cities of origin. Factors driving this migration include the perception of increased liberty and independence in large cities as well as many options of entertainment for this demographic. The cities of São Paulo, Rio de Janeiro, Salvador, Brasília, Belo Horizonte, Recife, Porto Alegre, Curitiba, and others, receive large influxes annually.

== Social conditions ==
=== Anti-LGBT violence ===
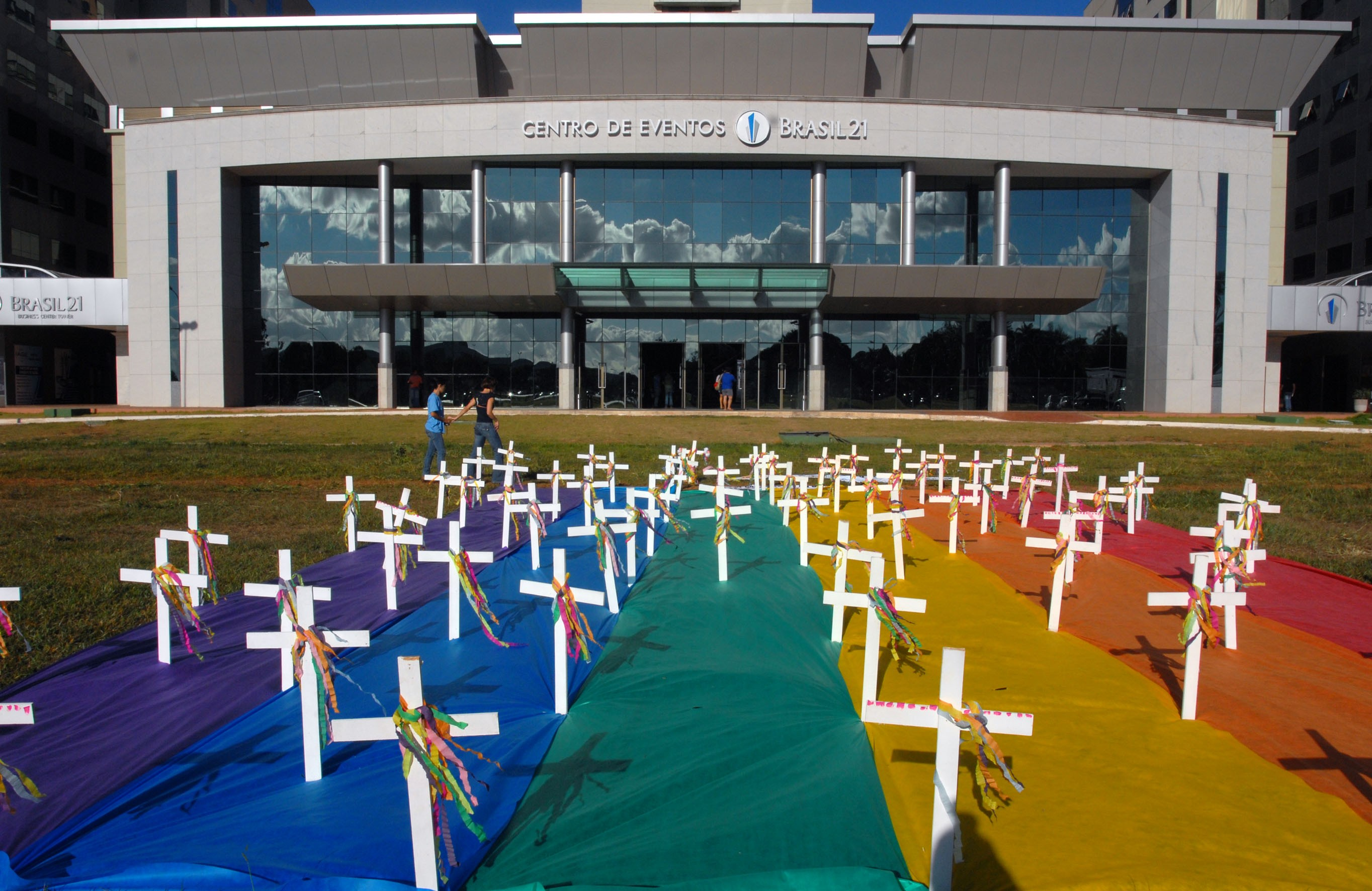
Crosses representing the dead people in the LGBT flag

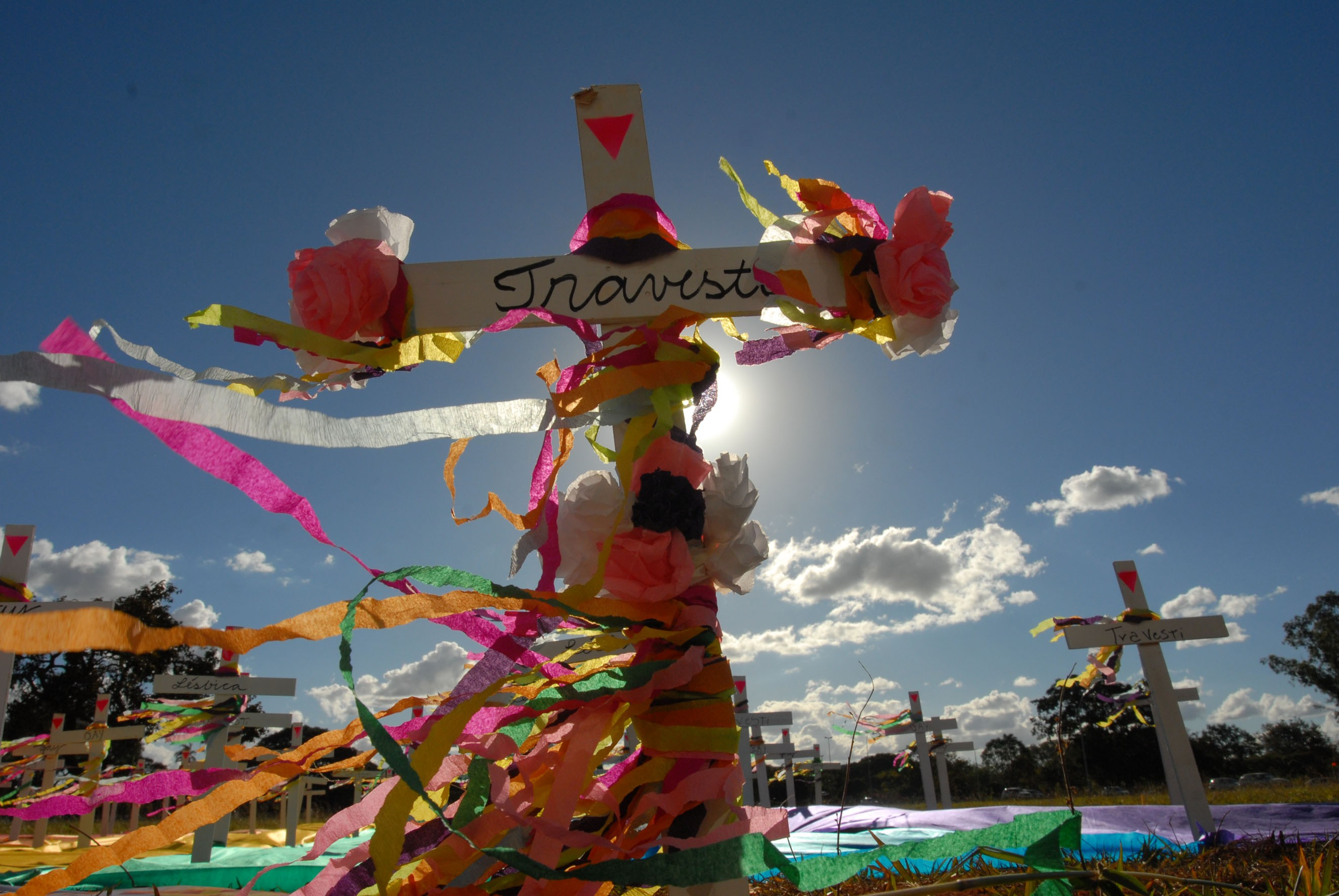
A cross representing a travesti

In 2004, the Grupo Gay da Bahia released a list with the names of 159 murdered members of the LGBT community that year. There is also a list with the names of people that allegedly suffered from human rights abuses that same year; some deaths caused directly by homophobia. In 2012, 77% of Brazilians supported the explicit criminalization of homophobia.

In mid-2006, Brazil launched Brazil Against Homophobia, an anti-homophobia campaign including television advertisement and billboards. According to a 2007 BBC article, activists estimate that between 1980 and 2006 some 2,680 gay people were murdered in Brazil, the majority thought to have been killed because of their sexuality.

The numbers produced by the Grupo Gay da Bahia (GGB) have been contested in multiple occasions on the grounds that they include all murders of LGBTQ people reported in the media – that is, not only those motivated by prejudice against homosexuals. Reinaldo de Azevedo, columnist of the Veja magazine, Brazil's most-read weekly publication, called the GGB's methodology "unscientific" based on the above objection.

Another criticism leveled at the numbers released by the GGB and organizations such as ANTRA (National Association of Transvestites and Transsexuals) is that, even assuming the data collection is credible, there is no basis for international comparison. Very few countries collect data on homophobic and transphobic violence, and the criminalization of homosexuality in many of them appears to preclude fair comparisons. According to a range of analyses in the field of Social Sciences, direct global comparisons regarding the murders of trans people, for instance, are flawed because the figures actually reflect each country's documentation capacity and the work of local organizations, rather than the total number of crimes committed. Consequently, the methodology behind this type of analysis is frequently criticized for having structural limitations and for penalizing supportive countries that collect data to formulate public policies for this demographic.

Sexualidade e Crimes de Ódio (Sexuality and Hate Crimes), produced by Vagner de Almeida and Richard Parker, is the first documentary film about brutalities committed against homosexuals in Brazil. In the directors' view, the hate crimes come from different segments of society, and that the Catholic Church and radical evangelical groups are also responsible for the rising intolerance, when they actively fight against the civil rights of non-heterosexuals. The film exposes life in metropolitan Rio de Janeiro, where various perpetrators murder members of the LGBTQ community with impunity. In the first months of 2008, there were 45 officially registered homicides against gays; some of the crimes included mutilations. Among the victims were gay men and lesbians, but also a large number of transsexuals.

A Brazilian gay blog that has investigated a few of the murders of gay people reported in the media – including some used by the GGB in its national statistic report – determined that the majority of murders from their chosen sample were committed by the partners of the victims or those who were otherwise sexually involved with them (e.g., male prostitutes), with some others being killed due to unpaid debts with gangs involved in drug trafficking. The blog also criticized the GGB for not publishing the names of all of the victims the GGB includes in its report to calculate the murder rate so that the motives of the crimes could be independently assessed.

According to Grupo Gay da Bahia, 343 LGBTQ people were murdered in Brazil in 2016, 387 in 2017, and 420 in 2018. This was an increase compared to 2001 (130 murders) and 2008 (187 murders). Of the 420 victims in 2018, 39% were gay men, 36% were transsexuals, 12% were lesbians and 2% were bisexuals. When divided by race, 213 were white (58.4%), 107 were mestizo (29.3%) and 45 were black (12.3%). Firearms were the most commonly used instruments in these crimes. The northern and central-western parts of Brazil recorded the most homicides, with the state of Alagoas registering the highest percentage of murders.

According to association Transgender Europe, Brazil has the highest number of murdered transgender people, with 900 homicides between 2008 and 2016, far ahead of Mexico (271), and nearly half of 2.264 registered murders in the world.

== Politics ==
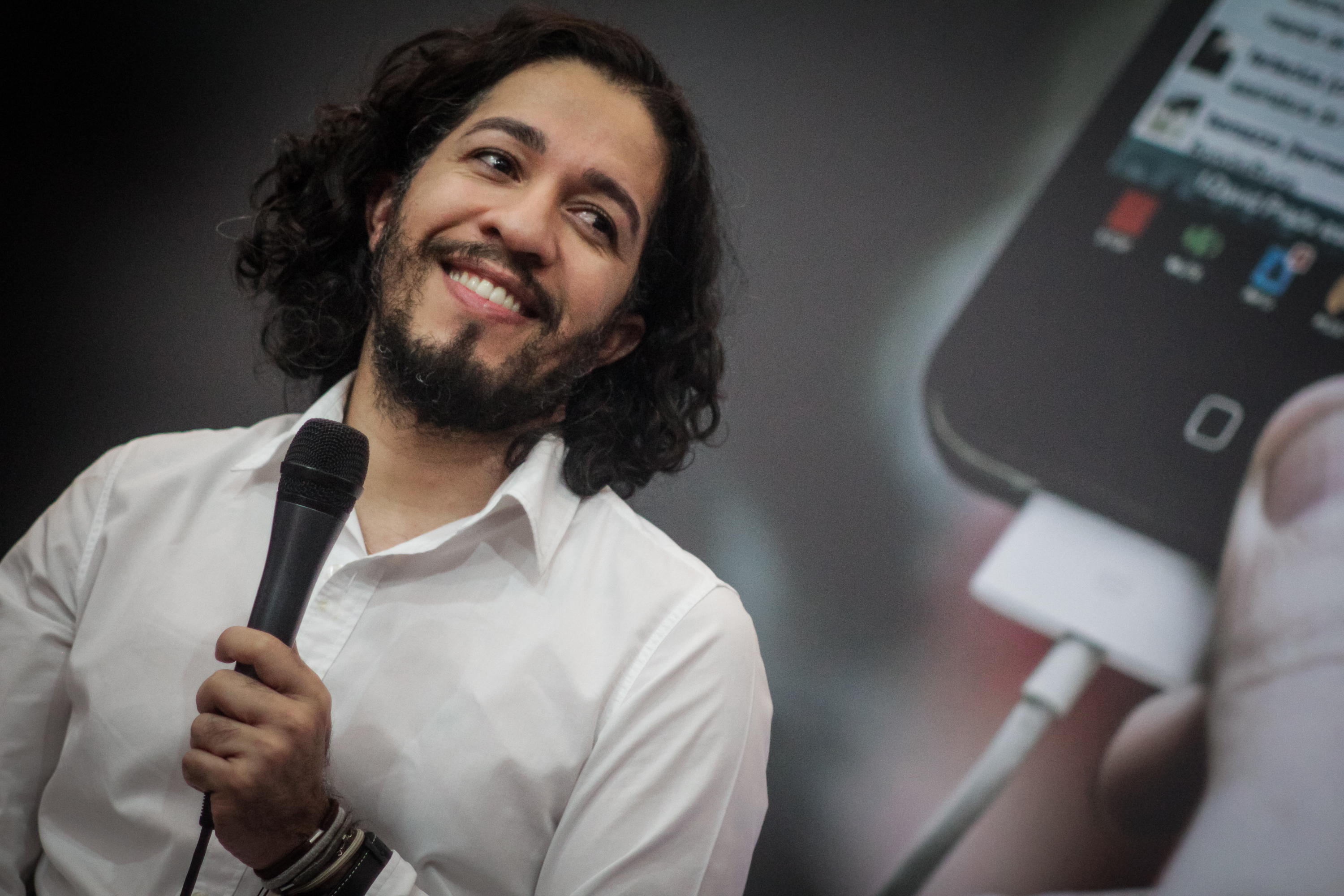
Jean Wyllys, an openly gay former congressman, and one of the leading advocates of the gay cause in Brazil

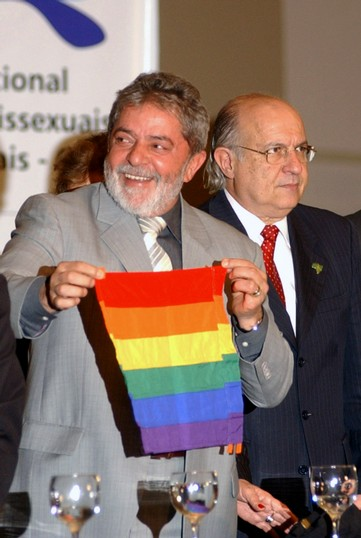
President Lula and the LGBT flag

There are many pro-LGBTQ political parties in Brazil; the most influential are the Socialism and Liberty Party, the Workers' Party and the Communist Party of Brazil. The most influential pro-LGBTQ politicians in Brazil are Marta Suplicy Smith, Eduardo Suplicy and Jean Wyllys. During the 2010 presidential elections in Brazil, all five presidential candidates were favorable to same-sex stable unions, including the elected President Dilma Rousseff.

In 2010, there were 190 political candidates who signed the Brazilian Association of Gays, Lesbians, Bisexuals and Transsexuals's "Declaration of Commitment". Those elected included 1 governor, 1 senator, 17 congressmen/congresswomen and 25 state representatives.

The Brazilian executive power has guaranteed many rights to LGBT Brazilians, such as the same social security pension benefits that heterosexual couples receive; the creation of the federal LGBTQ Council; prison visitation by same-sex couples; same income tax benefits that heterosexual couples receive; federal government recognition of same-sex marriages or same-sex stable unions for immigration purposes; health benefits for same-sex couples and mandatory health plans in the country; and LGBTQ people have a special place in Brazilian prisons, separate from other prisoners. Transsexuals have the right to be called by social name and not by birth name and be forwarded to women's prisons. LGBTQ people in prisons also have the right to choose male or female clothing.

One of the candidates for the City Council of Salvador, Bahia, the third largest city in Brazil, was Léo Kret (Republican Party (PR-BA)), a travesti club dancer who was the most voted for of the candidates. When she took office, she defied the dress code norms insisting that her wardrobe would be strictly feminine and insisted on using the women's restroom. Leo Kret received 12,861 votes in the city in the municipal elections of 2008. On election day, she said that she will defend LGBTQ rights. She has aspirations to become the President of Brazil one day.

Moacyr Sélia, a transexual hairdresser, sought reelection as a Nova Venécia councilmember, in the north of the state of Espírito Santo, representing the Republican Party. She was already the president of the Chamber of Parliament in two occasions.

Former President Jair Bolsonaro, elected to the Brazilian presidency in October 2018, has drawn controversy for his homophobic rhetoric. As "a self-declared homophobe", Bolsonaro has said he would prefer a dead son than a gay one. On January 2, 2019, just hours after his inauguration, he removed concerns regarding the LGBTQ community from being considered by the Human Rights Ministry and named no other federal agency to consider such issues. Bolsonaro also removed the HIV prevention task force after they began a campaign towards educating transgender Brazilians. There is also a risk that Bolsonaro will attempt to remove the 2013 decision to legalize same-sex marriage as he declared the decision "a blow to family unity and family values."

Following the 2018 Brazilian general election, Fabiano Contarato was elected as the first openly gay federal senator and Érica Malunguinho as the first trans woman representative. On February 1, 2019, David Miranda, a black gay representative, replaced Jean Wyllys, as Wyllys announced in January 2019 that he had left the country due to death threats.

Notwithstanding such progress, the Human Rights Measurement Initiative points out that 45% of human rights experts identified LGBTQIA+ people as being at risk of having the right to participate in government violated.

=== LGBT plan and conference ===
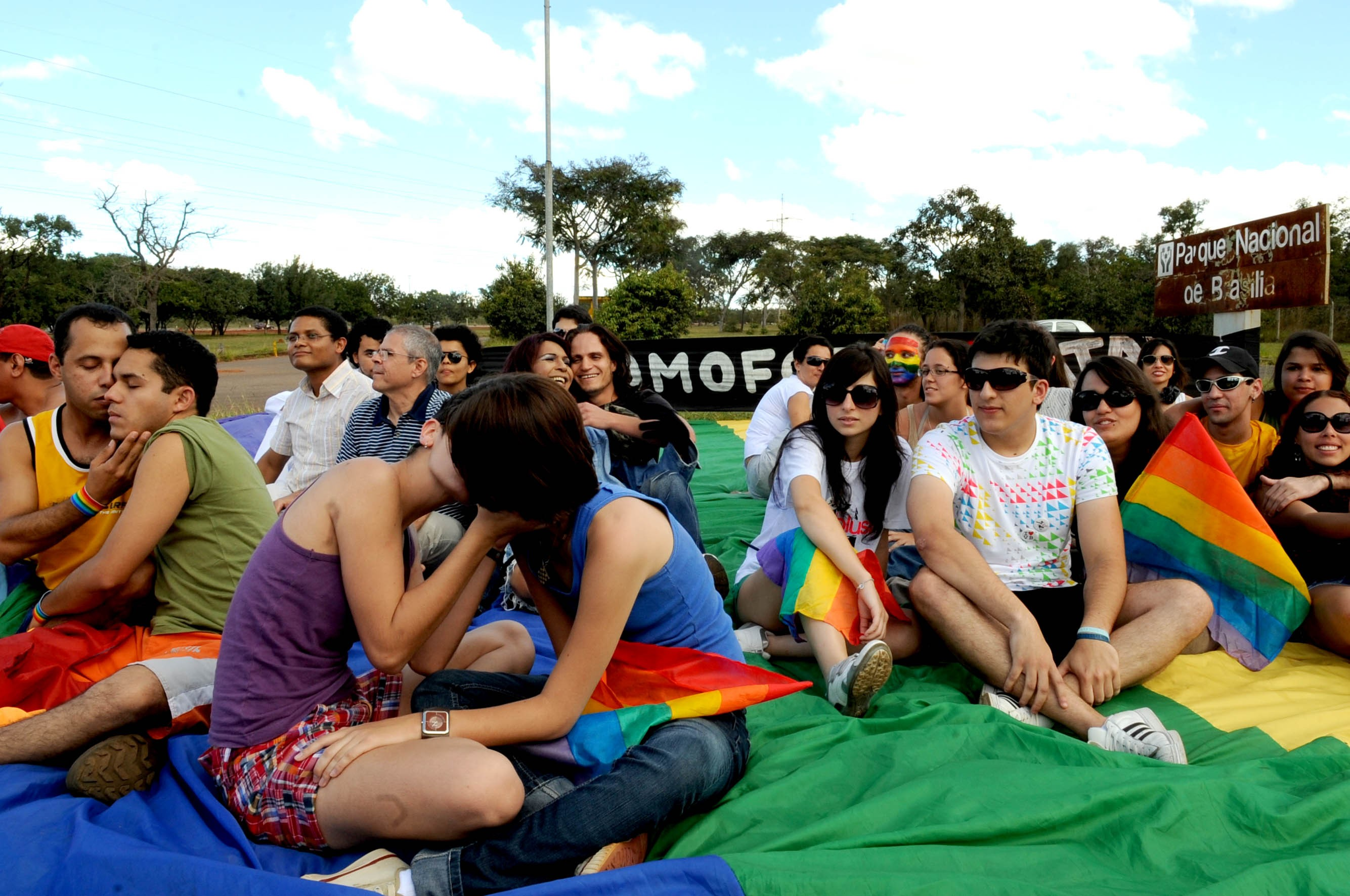
An anti-discrimination protest during the 2008 LGBT conference

==== Plan ====
The Federal Government of Brazil released in 2009 the National Plan of Promotion of the Citizenship and Human Rights of LGBT (Plano Nacional de Promoção da Cidadania e Direitos Humanos de LGBT), a groundbreaking national plan to promote the rights of gays, lesbians, bisexuals and transgender people. The plan may also play an important role in the approval of a law which would criminalize homophobic acts. The plan is composed of 51 key policies developed in June 2008 at the National LGBT Conference.

==== Conference ====
The first National Conference for Lesbians, Gay Men, Bisexuals, Travestis and Transsexuals (LGBT) was launched in 2008 by Brazilian Government, in the federal capital of Brasília. The event, the first in the world to be convened by a government, is a result of demands made by civil society and the Brazilian Government's support of LGBTQ rights. The Conference adopted the theme "Human rights and public policies: the way forward for guaranteeing the citizenship of Lesbians, Gay Men, Bisexuals, Travestis and Transsexuals."

During the conference, public policies were defined for this segment of the population and a National Plan for the Promotion of LGBT Citizenship and Human Rights was prepared. An evaluation was made of the 2004 federal government programme Brazil Without Homophobia to combat violence and discrimination against the LGBTQ population.

The holding of the conference coincided with the commemoration of the 60th anniversary of the Universal Declaration of Human Rights and reaffirmed the Federal Government's commitment to the issue of LGBTQ human rights. Marta Suplicy, Tourism Minister and a longstanding supporter of LGBTQ rights, commemorated the initiative. "At long last, after so many years, we are finally able to hold this Conference. It's a giant's stride forward for Brazil." For the Justice Minister, Tarso Genro, the LGBTQ Conference was a demonstration of respect for human rights. "A human rights agenda that does not contemplate this issue is incomplete," he declared. Also present at the opening ceremony were the Minister of the Special Department for Human Rights, Paulo Vannuchi, Senator Fátima Cleide of the Parliamentary Front for LGBT Citizenship, Minister of the Department for Racial Equality Policies Edson Santos, Minister of the Special Department for Women's Policies Nilcéa Freire, and the directors of the Ministry of Health's National Sexually Transmitted Disease and AIDS Programme, Mariângela Simão and Eduardo Barbosa.

Prior to the National Conference, conferences were held in Brazil's 27 states, convened by the state governors, in order to develop complementary proposals for the national policy document, define state-level policies and elect the delegates to the National Conference. More than 100 conferences were held at a municipal level.

== Religion and LGBT rights ==
Brazil is a secular state, in which there exists a separation of church and state. The country's most followed religion is Catholicism.

The Catholic Church teaches that homosexual acts are disordered and immoral, but some more progressive bishops in Brazil have a hard time divulging it publicly. Many Protestant churches hold the same basic position as the Catholic Church. In mainline liberal Protestant denominations, there is an effort to avoid homophobia.

Among evangelicals, there are some campaigns to reach out to homosexual men and women. Movimento pela Sexualidade Sadia (Social Movement for a Healthy Sexuality), an evangelical group headed by an ex-homosexual, leads efforts to evangelize in gay parades, talking about Christianity to participants and delivering leaflets featuring the testimonials of "ex-gays" and "ex-lesbians".

There may be a religious factor in Brazilian homosexuality. A minority of the Brazilian population adheres to Candomblé and other Afro-Brazilian religions (similar to Santería), where homosexuality is commonly accepted. For a comparison, there are some 19,000 recognized Catholic parishes in Brazil. Informal Candomblé temples are supposed to number some 12,000 in Rio de Janeiro alone. In Candomblé, many priests and priestesses are homosexual. Luiz Mott, the leader of the gay movement in Brazil, is a firm adherent of Candomblé. Many famous Brazilians turn to Afro-Brazilian religions in search of miracles to solve personal or family problems. Even former President Fernando Henrique Cardoso, though an atheist, had sympathy for and sometimes visited Candomblé rituals. Another minority of the Brazilian LGBTQ population adheres to alternative pagan groups, like Wicca, where homosexuality is also accepted.

In June 2018, the General Synod of Anglican Episcopal Church of Brazil voted to change its marriage canon to allow same-sex couples to get married.

=== Opposition ===
The main opponents of the advances of the gay rights movement in Brazil have generally been conservatives. Religion is the most cited reason for opposing gay rights. Regionally, opposition to the gay rights movement has been strongest in rural interior regions.

A national study from 2005 found that 80% of the Brazilian population opposed homosexuality and another survey in 2010 found that 63% of the population opposed stable unions between homosexual couples. Followers of the Catholic and Protestant faiths, specifically the Pentecostal and historical Protestant denominations, are the most likely to oppose homosexuality. However, followers of spiritist or Afro-Brazilian, along with religious "nones" are the least likely to oppose homosexuality and homosexual stable unions.

Catholic and evangelical politicians have also been trying to counter gay rights through the introduction of bills. Among them were Bill 2279/03 put forward by Representative Elimar Damasceno. It strove to ban public kissing between people of the same sex. Bill 2177/03, authored by Representative Neucimar Fraga, would have created an assistance program for sexual reorientation of persons who voluntarily opt for changing their sexual orientation from homosexuality to heterosexuality.

State representative Edino Fonseca, an Assembly of God government minister, introduced a bill in the Legislative Assembly of Rio de Janeiro to establish social services to support men and women wanting to "leave" homosexuality. He also introduced a bill to protect evangelical groups offering assistance to such men and women from discrimination and harassment. The latter bill faced severe opposition as well. It says: "No divulging of information on the possibility of support and/or the possibility of sexual reorientation of homosexuals is to be considered prejudice."

None of these bills has been made into law.

== Brazilian gay culture ==
=== Gay parades ===
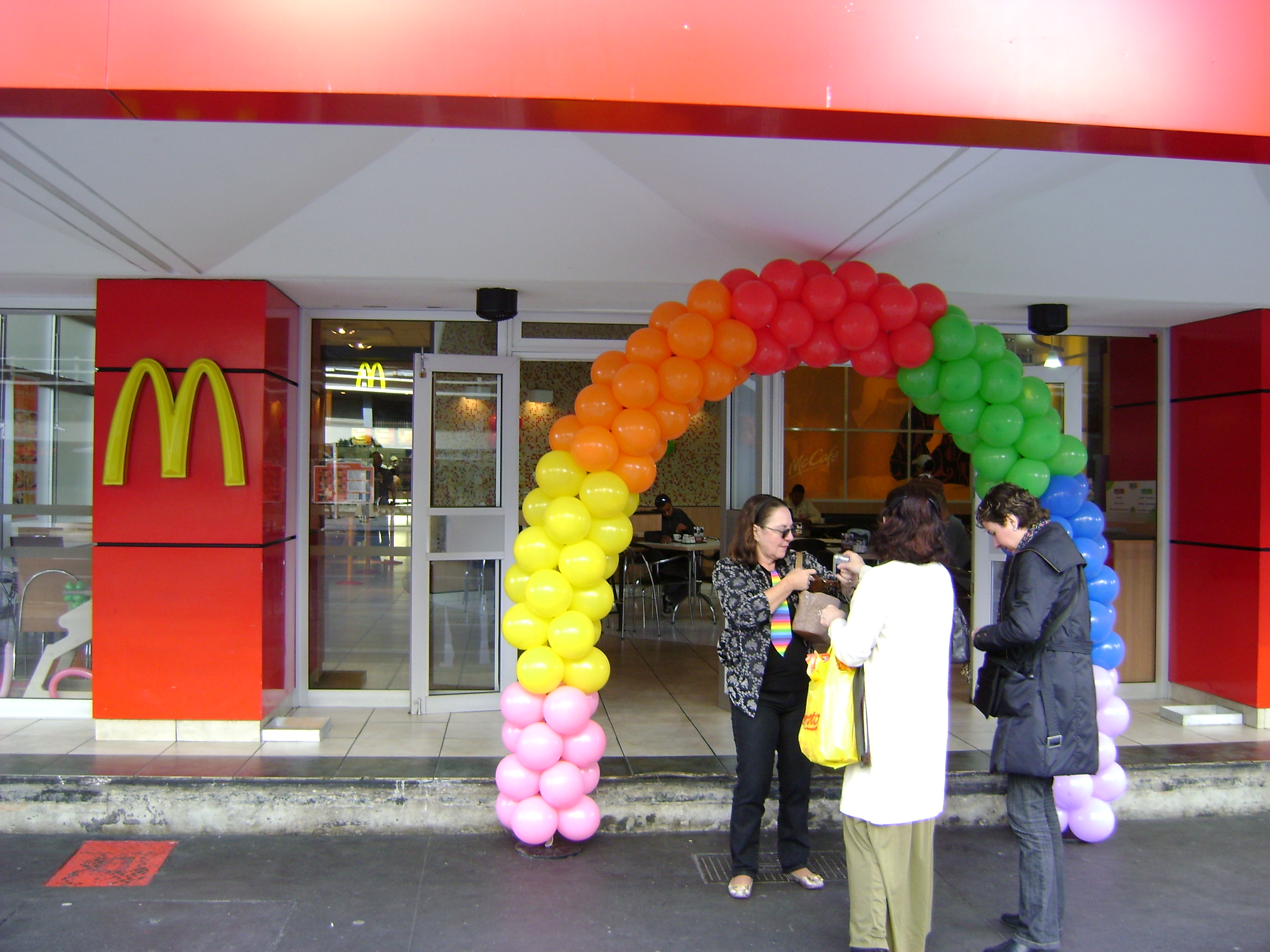
Brazilian McDonald's celebrating LGBT rights

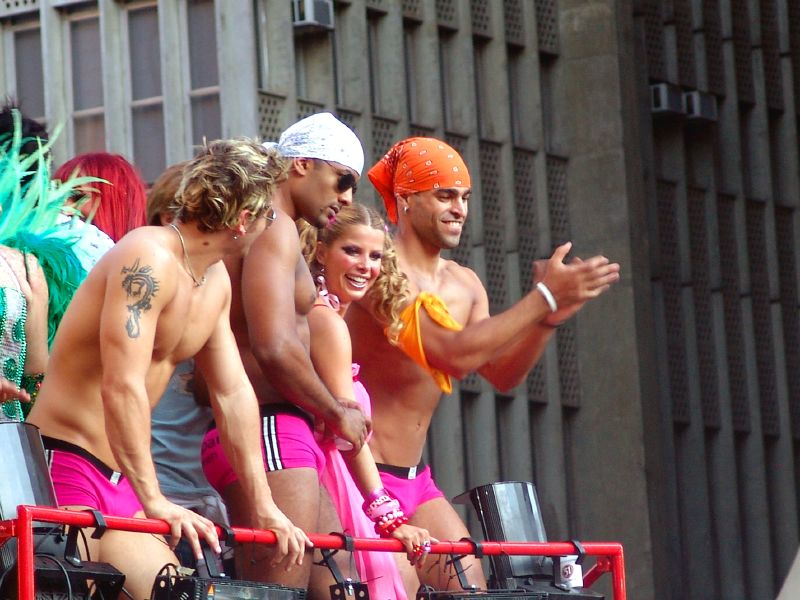
Brazilian actress Karina Bacchi celebrating at a pride parade with go-go boys

The São Paulo Gay Pride Parade is one of the biggest Pride Parades in the world. During the parade, LGBTQ people "unite and help build bridges and guarantee the plenitude of their rights".

More activities have been added to the event, such as the Cycle of Debates, the LGBT Cultural Fair, the Citizenship Award in Respect of Diversity, and the successful Gay Day, that happens on the Saturday before the main parade. The Cultural Fair has been part of the pride parade since 2001. APOGLBT (Associação da Parada do Orgulho LGBT de São Paulo) has recognized political and cultural initiatives which value the citizenship of LGBTQ people, every year since 2001.

Besides the São Paulo parade, several other Brazilian cities organize their own LGBTQ parades, mainly in the capitals of the states, such as Rio de Janeiro with about 1.5 million people, and Salvador with around 800,000 people.

Annual pride parades and events are held in all states, Acre (Rio Branco), Alagoas (Maceió, Arapiraca), Amapá (Macapá), Amazonas (Manaus, Parintins, Manacapuru), Bahia (Salvador), Ceará (Fortaleza, Juazeiro do Norte), the Federal District, Espírito Santo (Vitória), Goiás (Goiânia, Aparecida de Goiânia, Anápolis), Maranhão (São Luís), Mato Grosso (Cuiabá), Mato Grosso do Sul (Campo Grande, Dourados), Minas Gerais (Belo Horizonte, Uberlândia, Contagem, Juiz de Fora, Betim), Pará (Belém, Ananindeua), Paraíba (João Pessoa), Paraná (Curitiba, Londrina, Maringá), Pernambuco (Recife, Olinda, Caruaru), Piauí (Teresina, Parnaíba), Rio de Janeiro (Rio de Janeiro, São Gonçalo, Duque de Caxias, Nova Iguaçu, Niterói), Rio Grande do Norte (Natal), Rio Grande do Sul (Porto Alegre, Caxias do Sul, Pelotas), Rondônia (Porto Velho), Roraima (Boa Vista), Santa Catarina (Florianópolis), São Paulo (São Paulo, Guarulhos, Campinas, São Bernardo do Campo, Santo André), Sergipe (Aracaju), and Tocantins (Palmas), among numerous other cities.

== Brazilian LGBT activists ==
=== Jean Wyllys ===
Jean Wyllys is a prominent gay activist in Brazil. Wyllys was born in 1974 in a small town near Bahia. He was one of seven children and had to start working at the age of 10 to help his family financially. He earned his degree and became a journalist after moving to Salvador and Rio de Janeiro. He first found fame on the television show Big Brother in Brazil and soon became a popular gay rights activist in the country.

Wyllys was elected federal MP for the Socialism and Liberty party in 2010 and then was elected in 2011 to the Brazilian Chamber of Deputies as the first openly gay congressman. He served two terms in this position. His last election in October 2018 was supposed to start his third term in office, however he decided to quit this position and leave Brazil before the term began. He made this decision as the result of rising death threats to him and his family and after his close friend, Marielle Franco, an openly gay congresswoman, was killed in March 2018. Wyllys stated in an interview that the decision to leave the country and his job was difficult but also stated he wanted to live to continue fighting for the gay rights movement, saying in an interview "...we will do much more when the new time comes."

=== Míriam Martinho ===
Míriam Martinho is an important figure in the feminist and lesbian rights movement in Brazil. Martinho began her activism by working on a publication called ChanacomChana, a newspaper that focused on lesbianism and feminism. The group that published this newspaper, the Lesbian-Feminist Movement, disbanded and later became the Lesbian-Feminist Action Group (GALF). Martinho was a part of the "Brazilian Stonewall" movement in 1983 where activists from GALF protested against discrimination at Ferro's bar, which was a popular bar in the lesbian community at the time. Since the mid-1990s, the date of the "Brazilian Stonewall" event, August 19, has become the Day of Lesbian Pride.

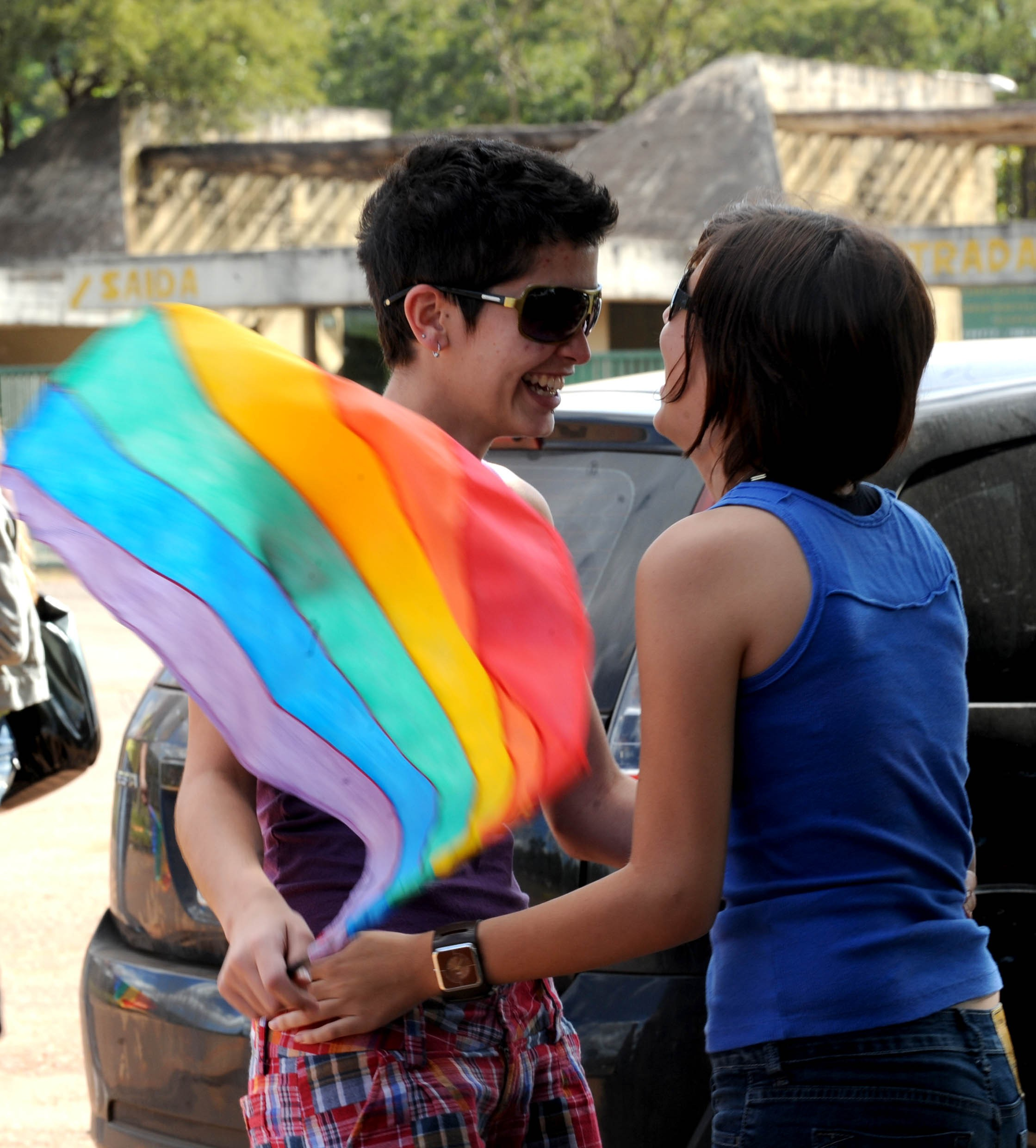
Lesbians embracing at a Pride Parade in Brazil in 2009

Martinho has remained heavily involved in the lesbian and feminist movement in Brazil and has written several publications on lesbianism and the gay rights movement. One of her publications was included in the report by the Immigration and Refugee Board of Canada discussing lesbian discrimination in Brazil. She now works as a journalist and editor-in-chief for the website "Um Outro Olhar," that focuses on the LGBTQ movement around the world with a focus on lesbian issues. She also writes on the blogs "Contra o Coro dos Contentes" and "Memória/História MHB-MLGBT."

== Summary table ==
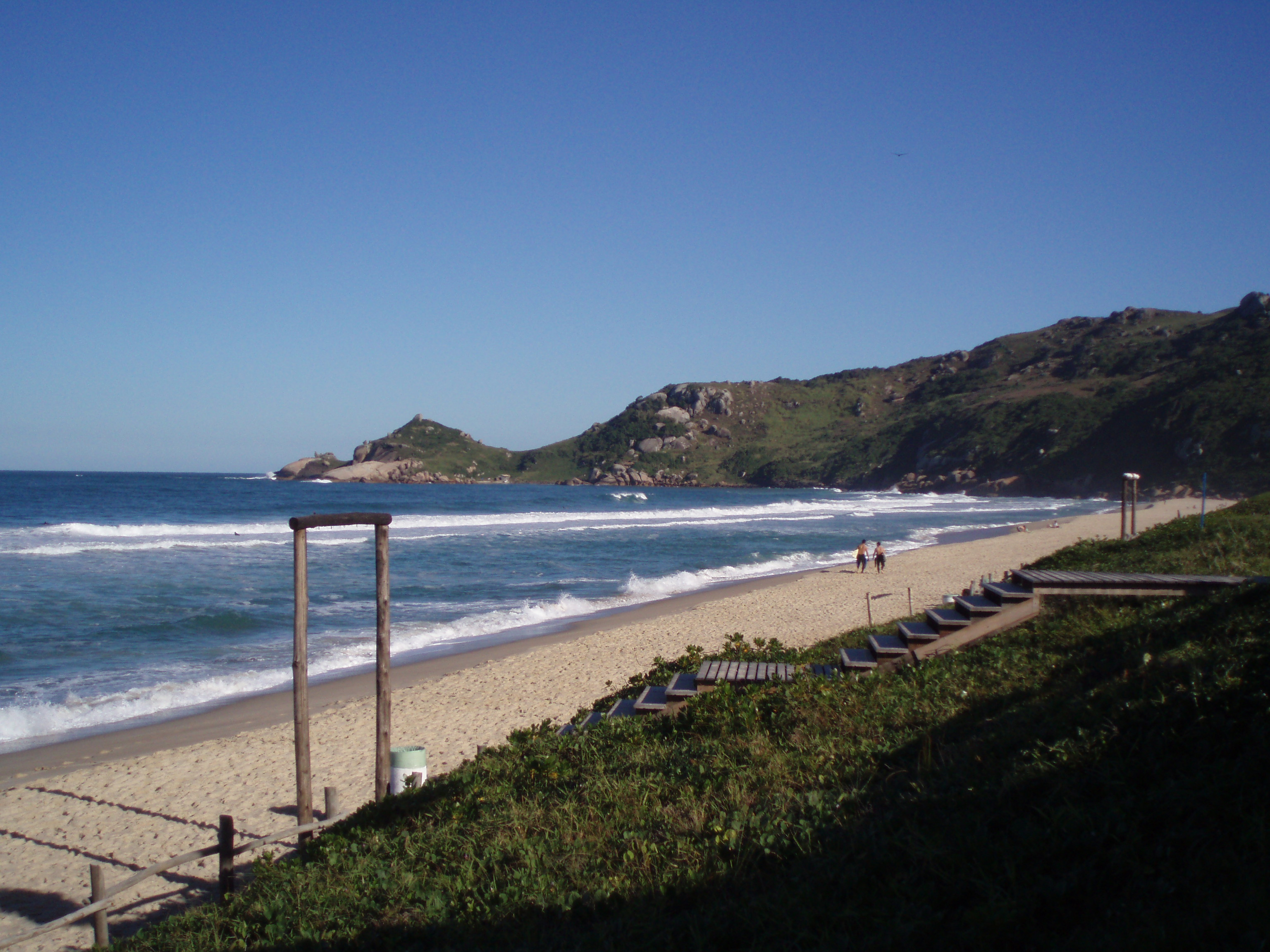
View of Mole Beach, the LGBT Beach in the city of Florianópolis

| Same-sex sexual activity legal | Yes (Since 1830) |
| Equal age of consent (14) | Yes (Since 1830) |
| LGBTQ people allowed to serve openly in the military | Yes |
| Homosexuality declassified as an illness | Yes (Since 1985) |
| Conversion therapy banned | Yes (Since 1999 for homosexuals and since 2018 for transgender people) |
| Right to change legal gender | Yes (Gender change allowed since 2009, surgery not required since 2018) |
| Stepchild adoption and joint adoption by same-sex couples | Yes (Starting in 2010; full adoption rights since 2015) |
| Recognition of same-sex couples | Yes (Stable unions performed starting in 2004, and all rights as recognized family entities available nationwide since 2011) |
| Same-sex marriage | Yes (Starting in 2011; nationwide since 2013) |
| Access to IVF for lesbians and altruistic surrogacy for gay male couples | Yes (Since 2013) |
| Automatic parenthood for both spouses after birth | Yes (Since 2016) |
| Transexuality declassified as an illness | Yes (Since 2018) |
| Gender-affirming health care for minors | No (Since 2025; repeal pending) |
| Anti-discrimination laws for sexual orientation and gender identity in employment, provision of goods and services, and all other areas (including indirect discrimination, hate speech) | Yes (Nationwide since 2019, by decision of the Supreme Federal Court, but not federal law) |
| Transgender people allowed to use restrooms and other gender-segregated spaces that correspond with their gender identity | Yes / No (Varies by region; Supreme Court decision pending) |
| MSM allowed to donate blood | Yes (Since 2020) |
| Third option 'ignored sex' for intersex children on birth certificates | Yes (Since 2021) |
| Third gender option for non-binary people on birth certificates | Yes / No (Varies by region) |
| Intersex minors protected from invasive surgical procedures | Yes (Since 2023) |
| Recognition of sexual orientation and gender identity for asylum requests | Yes (Since 2023) |
| LGBTQ anti-bullying law in public and private schools | Yes (Since 2024) |
| Public documents with gender-neutral parenthood | Yes (Since 2024) |
| Legal access to single gender-neutral bathrooms | No / Yes (Proposed at federal level; already existing in some institutions) |
| Commercial surrogacy for gay male couples | No (Banned regardless of sexual orientation) |

== See also ==
- Same-sex marriage in Brazil
- LGBTQ rights in Bahia
- LGBTQ rights in São Paulo (state)
- LGBTQ rights in Amazonas
- LGBTQ rights in Rio de Janeiro (state)
- Human rights in Brazil
- Beyond Carnival by James N. Green.
- João W. Nery

General:

- LGBT rights in the Americas
