= LGBTQ rights in the Federal District =

- Legal status: Legal since 1830, age of consent equalised
- Gender identity: Gender change allowed, official standard for altering legal sex doesn't require surgery since 2018
- Military: Allowed to serve openly
- Discrimination protections: Yes, since 2000 for sexual orientation; since 2019 for gender identity

Family rights
- Recognition of relationships: Same-sex marriage since 2012
- Adoption: Legal since 2010

Lesbian, gay, bisexual, transgender and queer (LGBTQ) people in the Brazilian Federal District enjoy many of the same legal protections available to non-LGBTQ people. Homosexuality is legal in the state. However, in 2023, the Federal District was ranked as the Brazilian federative unit with the highest number of reports of homophobia and transphobia.

== Recognition of same-sex unions ==
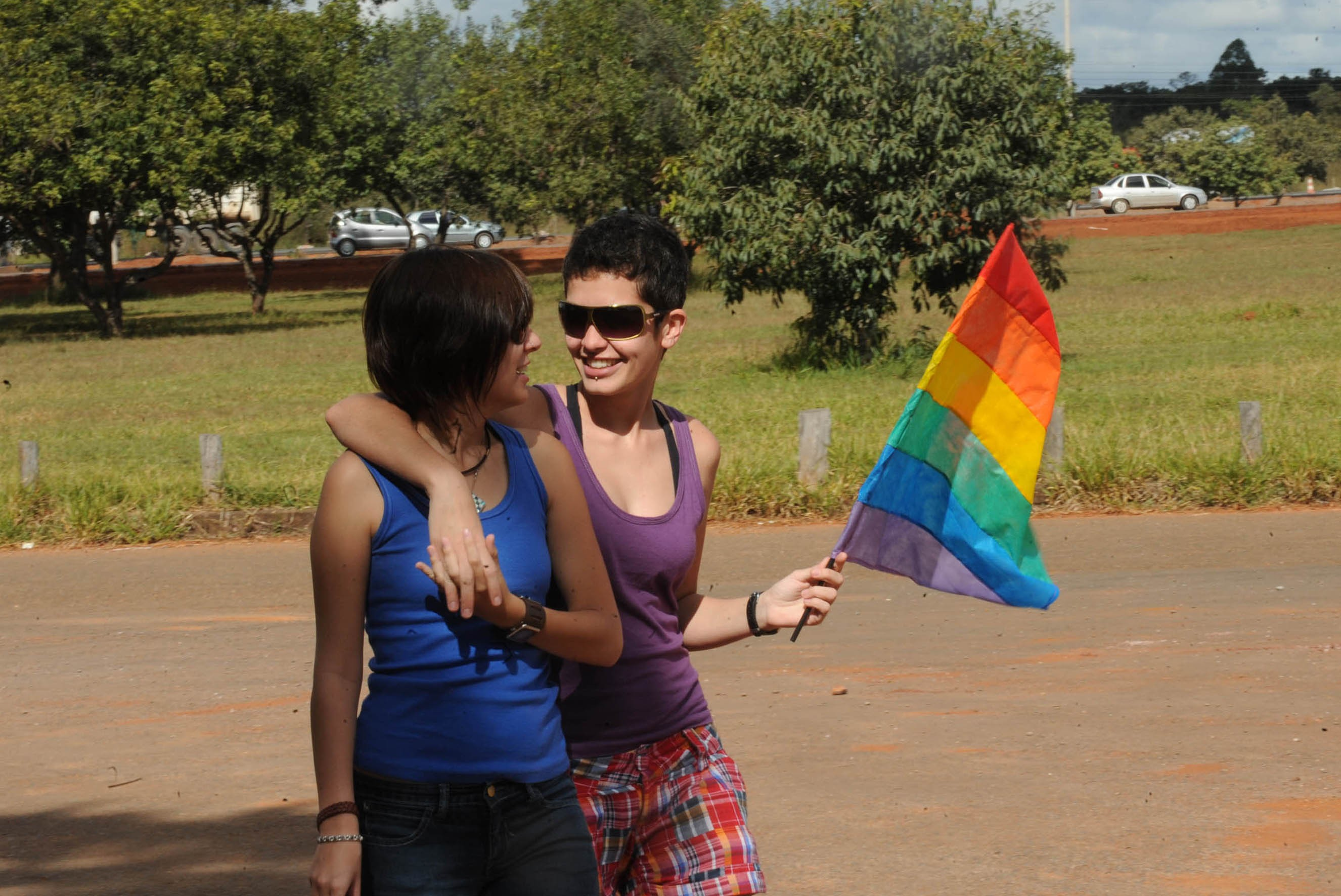
Lesbian couple in Brasília.

On 1 December 2012, the Court of Public Registers of the Brazilian Federal District (DF), ruled that, effective immediately, same-sex marriage licenses should be granted without a judge's intervention.

== Gender identity and expression ==
The Supreme Federal Court of Brazil ruled on 1 March 2018, that a transgender person has the right to change their official name and sex without the need of surgery or professional evaluation, just by self-declaration of their psychosocial identity.

On 21 August 2023, the Court of Justice of the Federal District ruled that non-binary people can change their documents to reflect their gender identity directly at the registry office, without needing a court decision.

On 17 October 2024, the University of Brasília approved a resolution to establish quotas for trans people, reserving 2% of its openings for travestis, trans women, trans men, transmasculine people, and non-binary individuals. On 6 August 2025, the university announced the rules for the 2026 entrance exam, including quotas for trans individuals.

In November 2025, the Associação Matria filed a lawsuit against the university, arguing that the requirement for the gender self-identification could facilitate fraud and that the university lacked the authority to establish such quotas. On 8 October 2026, Judge Francisco Valle Brum, of the 21st Federal Court of the Federal District, dismissed the lawsuit.

== Discrimination protections ==
On 26 October 2000, the president of the Legislative Chamber of the Federal District, Edimar Pireneus, sanctioned Law No. 2,615, prohibiting discrimination based on sexual orientation. On 8 May 2013, Federal District Governor Agnelo Queiroz signed a decree regulating the law (Note: The 2000 law had been passed by the Chamber, vetoed by the state governor, and subsequently enacted by the Chamber president after the Chamber overrode the governor's veto. The law required the executive branch to sign a decree regulating the law's implementation.) and establishing a fine of 50,000 reais for discrimination based on sexual orientation in commercial establishments; however, the decree was revoked by the governor on May 9.

In January 2017, the Federal District Public Prosecutor's Office filed a lawsuit against the district government over the failure to regulate the 2000 law. On June 23, Governor Rodrigo Rollemberg signed a decree to regulate the law, drawing criticism from conservative politicians. That same month, the Chamber voted 9–6 to overturn the decree. In July, Rollemberg and the Socialism and Liberty Party filed a lawsuit with the Supreme Federal Court challenging the Chamber's decision; the Court unanimously overturned that decision in November 2020.

Since 2019, discrimination based on gender identity has been prohibited nationwide in Brazil, through a decision by the Supreme Federal Court.

== Conversion therapy ==
Conversion therapy has been forbidden by the Federal Council of Psychology since 1999. In September 2017, a federal judge in Brasília approved the use of conversion therapy by a psychoogist to "cure" people of homosexuality, overruling the 1999 decision. However, in December 2017, the same judge changed his decision, keeping the “treatment” banned. Subsequently, the Supreme Federal Court decided to ban conversion therapy. In January 2018, the Federal Council of Psychology established norms of performance for psychologists in relation to transsexuals and travestis, also banning any conversion therapy.

On 2 December 2025, the Legislative Chamber of the Federal District approved a bill to criminalize conversion therapies.
