= LGBTQ rights in Bahia =

- Legal status: Legal since 1830, age of consent equalised
- Gender identity: Gender change allowed, official standard for altering legal sex doesn't require surgery since 2018
- Military: Allowed to serve openly
- Discrimination protections: Sexual orientation since 1997; Gender identity since 2019

Family rights
- Recognition of relationships: Same-sex marriage since 2012
- Adoption: Legal since 2010

Lesbian, gay, bisexual, transgender and queer (LGBTQ) rights in Bahia have been the subject of advances over the last few decades, driven by social movements, public policies and specific legislation. The Brazilian state is often cited as a pioneer in implementing initiatives aimed at promoting citizenship and protecting the rights of the community, in addition to acting to combat discrimination and violence.

== Legality ==
Same-sex sexual activity has been legal in Bahia, as well as throughout Brazil, since 1830.

=== Recognition of same-sex unions ===
Same-sex marriages have been recognized by notaries in the state of Bahia since November 26, 2012.

==== Statistics ====
According to the Grupo Gay da Bahia (Gay Group of Bahia – GGB), the book of homosexual stable union, instituted years ago, states that do not recognize registration of marriages in the registry, the Instituto Nacional de Segurança Social – INSS (National Institute of Social Security) still recognizes this document as a means for, occasionally, sharing inheritance, receiving a pension, etc. There are already 30 legal cases in the State of Bahia between gays and lesbians. This includes a case in which the companion died and the surviving spouse received the pension.

=== Adoption and parenting ===
On March 9, 2010, a court in Salvador authorized the adoption of a child by a lesbian couple.

== Discrimination protections ==
Bahia was the first Brazilian state to enact an anti-discrimination ordinance in 1997.

On June 1, 2022, the Legislative Assembly of Bahia passed a bill to ban discrimination based on sexual orientation and gender identity in the state. On June 30, 2022, the Speaker of the Assembly, Adolfo Menezes, signed the bill into law. The bill was named the "Millena Passos Law" in honor of transgender activist Millena Passos.

== Gender identity and expression ==
Transgender people have been able to change their name and legal gender since 2008, and gender self-determination has been permitted since 2018. The Bahia Public Defender's Office, in partnership with other agencies, carries out joint efforts to facilitate the process of document rectification for transgender people.

On May 23, 2017, Governor of Bahia Rui Costa signed a decree granting transgender people the right to use their social name instead of their legal name. According to the decree, the social name must be accompanied by the legal name on official documents. Minors require authorization from their guardians.

On May 11, 2022, the Court of Justice of the State of Bahia has allowed a third gender option on documents.

On December 26, 2024, the Governor of Bahia, Jerônimo Rodrigues, sanctioned Law 14,806 (Portuguese: Lei 14.806), which establishes exemption from costs for protest certificates, making the process of rectifying documents free of charge for transgender people.

== Education ==
On December 17, 2025, the Salvador City Council approved a bill banning the teaching of gender identity in schools. On March 26, 2026, the city's mayor, Bruno Soares Reis (UNIÃO), signed the bill into law.

== Life conditions ==
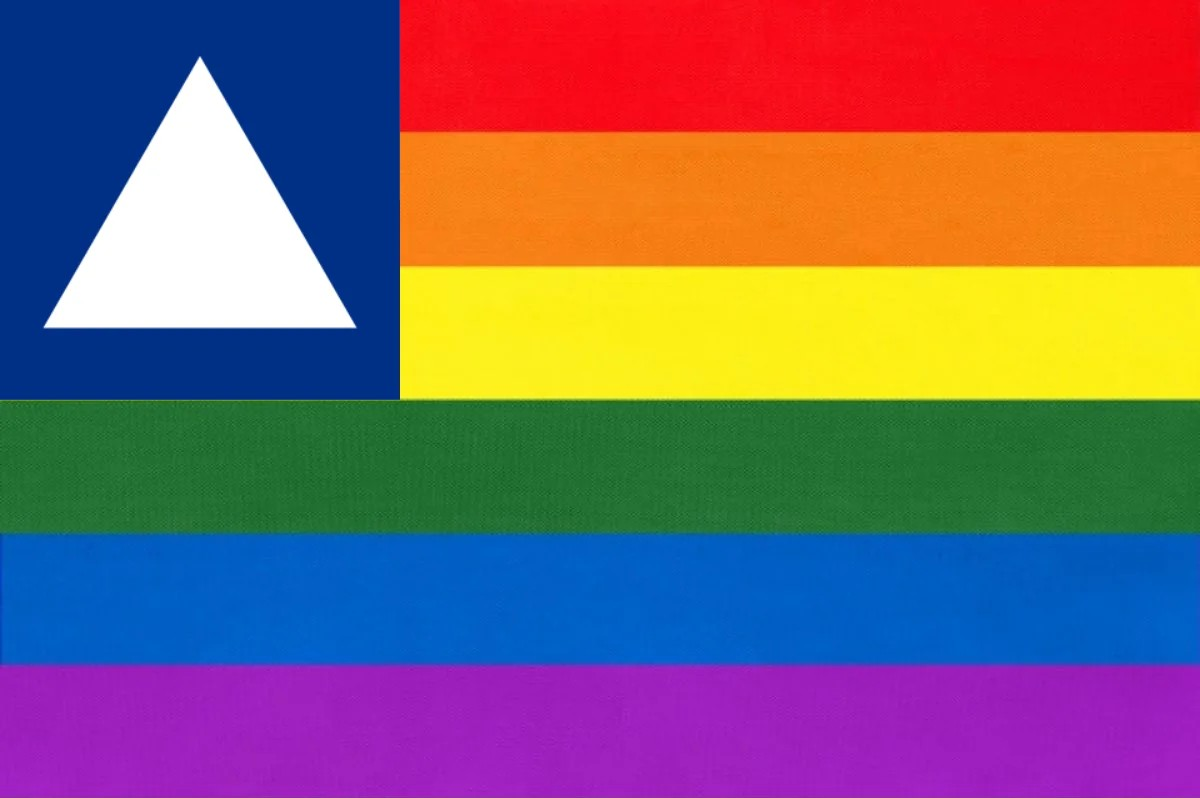
Unofficial flag of the LGBTQ community of Bahia.

=== Activism and advocacy ===
Grupo Gay da Bahia, the oldest gay rights organization in Brazil, was founded in Salvador, Bahia in 1980.

=== Events ===
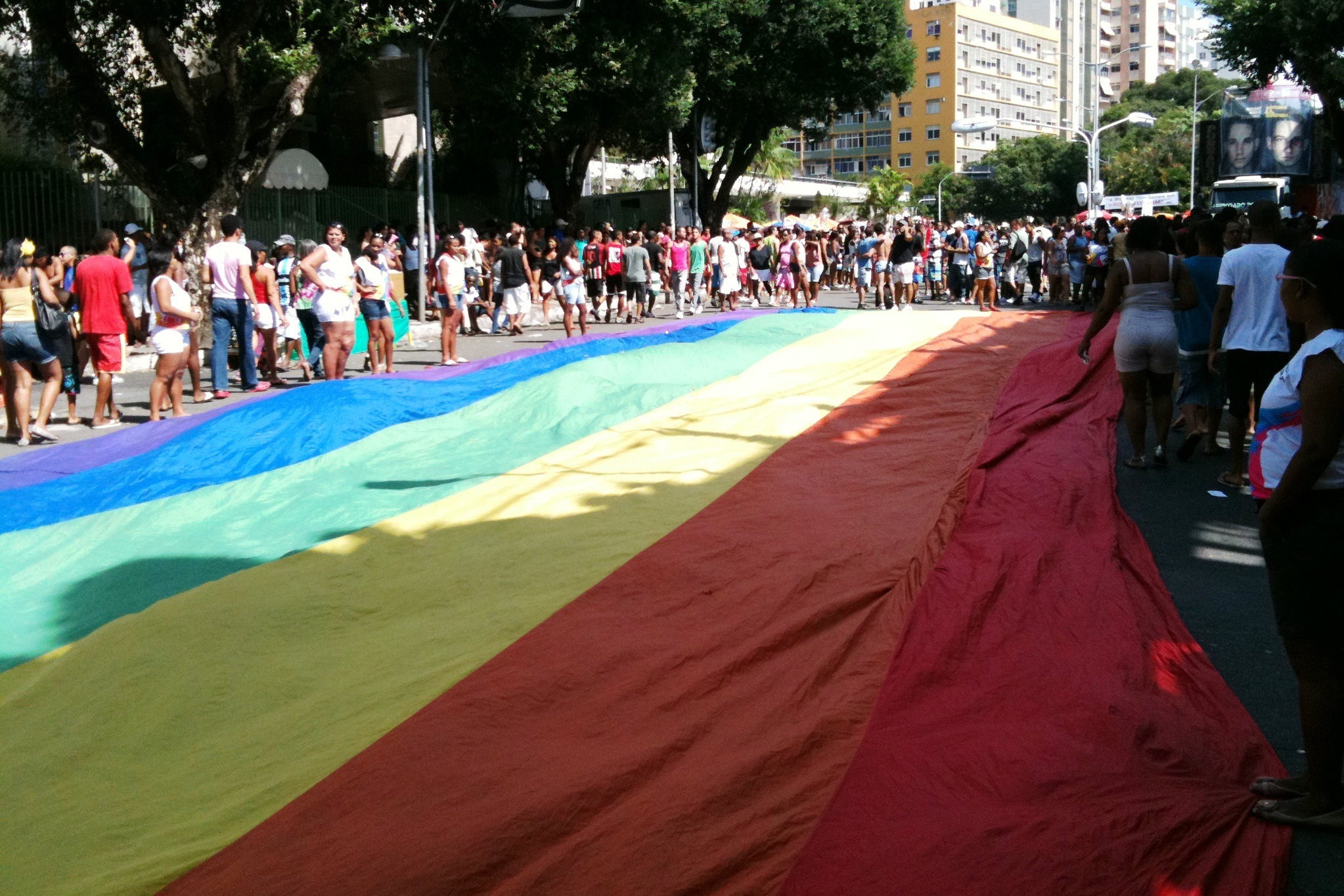
Salvador Pride Parade in 2011.

Salvador plays host to an annual Pride parade every September with 800,000 people having attended in 2010.

=== Homophobia ===
In 2004, Grupo Gay da Bahia released a list with the names of 159 murdered members of the LGBTQ community in that year. There is also a list with the names of people that allegedly suffered from human rights abuses in the same year. Some deaths caused directly by homophobia. A notorious case of homophobia occurred in 2022 when a teenager was the victim of attacks in Camaçari. The episode generated national repercussions and mobilized state authorities.

=== Healthcare ===
The preventative program for transvestite sex workers of Bahia with STD/AIDS resulted successfully: after research on the local community, a booklet, a folder and a poster were produced. All with realistic language and images peculiar to this subculture. Every week safe sex workshops and interventions with the transvestites in different areas of sex work are accomplished. In six months, the program recorded 900 interventions, and distributed 14,400 condoms. Advocates of STD/AIDS education, together with transvestite sex workers, must incorporate elements of the local subculture and depend on the trust of the social actor in order to be successful.

=== Politics ===
One of the candidates for city council of Salvador, Bahia, the third largest city in Brazil, that won the seat, was Léo Kret, a travesti club dancer and was the most voted for of the candidates. So when she took office, she defied the dress code norms insisting that her wardrobe would be strictly feminine and insisted on using the women's restroom.

Leo Kret received 12,861 votes in the city, by the Republican Party (PR-BA) in the municipal elections of 2008. In the day of election, she said that she will defend the LGBTQ rights. She has aspirations to become the president of Brazil one day.

== Summary table ==
Same-sex sexual activity legal	Yes (Since 1830)
Equal age of consent	Yes (Since 1830)
Anti-discrimination laws in employment only	Yes (Since 1997 for sexual orientation; Since 2019 for gender identity)
Anti-discrimination laws in the provision of goods and services	Yes (Since 1997 for sexual orientation; Since 2019 for gender identity)
LGBTQ subjects free from censorship in education	Yes / No (Mentions of gender identity banned in Salvador since 2026)
Anti-discrimination laws in all other areas (Incl. indirect discrimination, hate speech)	Yes (Since 1997 for sexual orientation; Since 2019 for gender identity)
Same-sex marriages	Yes (Since 2012)
Recognition of same-sex couples	Yes (Since 2011)
Stepchild adoption by same-sex couples	Yes (Since 2010)
Joint adoption by same-sex couples	Yes (Since 2010)
LGBTQ people allowed to serve openly in the military	Yes
Right to change legal gender	Yes (Since 2008)
Third gender option	Yes (Since 2022)
Conversion therapy by medical professionals banned	Yes (Since 1999 for homosexuals and since 2018 for transgender people)
Access to IVF for lesbians	Yes
Commercial surrogacy for gay male couples	No (Illegal for any couple regardless of sexual orientation)
MSMs allowed to donate blood	Yes (Since 2020)

== See also ==
- Grupo Gay da Bahia - Bahia-based LGBTQ organization
- Dendê Futebol Clube - a gay Bahia-based sports club that promotes LGBTQ inclusion
- LGBTQ rights in Brazil
