= LGBTQ rights in Roraima =

LGBTQ rights in a state of Brazil

- Legal status: Legal since 1830, age of consent equalised
- Gender identity: Gender change allowed, official standard for altering legal sex doesn't require surgery since 2018
- Military: Allowed to serve openly
- Discrimination protections: Yes, since 2019

Family rights
- Recognition of relationships: Same-sex marriage since 2012
- Adoption: Legal since 2010

Lesbian, gay, bisexual, transgender and queer (LGBTQ) people in the Brazilian state of Roraima enjoy many of the same legal protections available to non-LGBTQ people. Homosexuality is legal in the state.

== Legality of same-sex sexual activity ==
Same-sex sexual activity has been legal in Brazil since 1830.

== Recognition of same-sex unions ==
Same-sex marriage has been legal in Roraima since 2013 via a decision by the National Council of Justice, in compliance with a previous decision of the Supreme Federal Court in 2011.

== Adoption and parenting ==
Since 2010, same-sex adoption has been officially permitted in the state through a decision by the Supreme Federal Court.

== Hate crimes and discrimination law ==
In Roraima, there is a law that combats homophobia, namely State Ordinance No. 1,797/2023.

In 2019, discrimination based on sexual orientation and gender identity was banned through a decision by the Supreme Federal Court.

== Gender identity and expression ==
The Supreme Federal Court of Brazil ruled on 1 March 2018, that a transgender person has the right to change their official name and sex without the need of surgery or professional evaluation, just by self-declaration of their psychosocial identity.

On 9 August 2023, a law was published in the Official Gazette of Boa Vista prohibiting transgender athletes from participating in sports according to their gender identity. The law had been approved by Mayor Genilson Costa, of the Solidarity party.

== Education ==
On 7 November 2023, the mayor of Boa Vista, Arthur Henrique, of the Brazilian Democratic Movement party, signed a law prohibiting the use of gender-neutral language in the city's schools.
