= LGBTQ rights in Paraíba =

- Legal status: Legal since 1830, age of consent equalised
- Gender identity: Gender change allowed, official standard for altering legal sex doesn't require surgery since 2018
- Military: Allowed to serve openly
- Discrimination protections: Yes, since 2003 for sexual orientation; since 2017 for gender identity

Family rights
- Recognition of relationships: Same-sex marriage since 2013
- Adoption: Legal since 2012

Lesbian, gay, bisexual, transgender and queer (LGBTQ) rights in the Brazilian state of Paraíba have had significant legal advances in recent decades.

== Legality ==
In 1830, Brazilian Emperor Dom Pedro I sanctioned the Imperial Penal Code, removing all references to sodomy from Brazilian law.

=== Recognition of same-sex unions ===
On April 26, 2013, Judge Márcio Murilo da Cunha Ramos, of the General Court of Justice of Paraíba, published Provision CGJ No. 006, authorizing the registration of civil unions and same-sex marriages in the state.

== Discrimination protections ==
On January 10, 2003, the Governor of Paraíba, Cássio Cunha Lima, sanctioned Law No. 7,309, which prohibits discrimination based on sexual orientation.

On June 8, 2017, the governor of Paraíba, Ricardo Coutinho, signed Law No. 10909, amending Law No. 7,309 to prohibit discrimination based on gender identity.

== Gender identity and expression ==
The Supreme Federal Court of Brazil ruled on 1 March 2018, that a transgender person has the right to change their official name and sex without the need of surgery or professional evaluation, just by self-declaration of their psychosocial identity.

In January 2023, the Court of Justice of Paraíba (TJPB) published Provision CGJ-TJPB nº 89 authorizing the alteration of the sex marker to "X" without a court order.

In April 2026, the João Pessoa City Council approved a bill aimed at banning transgender women from competing in women's sports. As of May 10, 2026, the bill has not yet been approved or vetoed by the city's mayor, Leo Bezerra (PSB).

On May 26, 2026, the Legislative Assembly of Paraíba published a law in the state's Official Gazette prohibiting trans women from competing in women's sports in the state. The law was proposed by Representative Wallber Virgolino (PL).

=== Bathroom access ===
On May 25, 2020, the mayor of Campina Grande, Romero Rodrigues (PSD), signed a law prohibiting trans people from using restrooms that correspond to their gender identity in the city schools.

On September 26, 2022, the Public Prosecutor's Office of Paraíba, the Federal Public Prosecutor's Office, and the Labor Prosecution Service signed a resolution recommending that transgender individuals use restrooms corresponding to their gender identity in public offices and schools across the state. The notice was sent to state prosecutors on the 29th.

On December 18, 2023, the Federal University of Paraíba approved a resolution allowing trans people to use university restrooms in accordance with their gender identity.

On July 23, 2024, the Court of Justice of Paraíba ordered a shopping mall in João Pessoa to pay 15,000 reais in compensation to a trans woman after denying her access to the women's restroom. According to the case records, the woman was prevented from using the women's restroom by a mall employee, who also called her a "traveco" ("tranny") and a "veado" ("faggot").

== Censorship ==
=== Gender-neutral language ban ===
On December 5, 2017, the Sousa City Council approved bill 051/2017, which prohibits teaching about sexual orientation and gender identity in the city's schools.

Other cities in the state, such as Patos and Campina Grande, have also approved similar bills.

=== Pride parades ===
On November 7, 2023, the João Pessoa City Council approved bill number 1,527, which aims to prohibit the participation of children and adolescents in LGBTQ pride events in the city. The Public Prosecutor's Office of Paraíba (MPPB) recommended that the city's mayor, Tarcísio Jardim, veto the bill.

== Summary table ==
Same-sex sexual activity legal	Yes (Since 1830)
Equal age of consent	Yes (Since 1830)
Anti-discrimination laws in employment only	Yes (Since 2003 for sexual orientation; since 2017 for gender identity)
Anti-discrimination laws in the provision of goods and services	Yes (Since 2003 for sexual orientation; since 2017 for gender identity)
Anti-discrimination laws in all other areas (Incl. indirect discrimination, hate speech)	Yes (Since 2003 for sexual orientation; since 2017 for gender identity)
Same-sex marriages	Yes (Since 2013)
Recognition of same-sex couples	Yes (Since 2010)
Stepchild adoption by same-sex couples	Yes (Since 2010)
Joint adoption by same-sex couples	Yes (Since 2010)
LGBTQ people allowed to serve openly in the military	Yes
Right to change legal gender	Yes (Since 2008; gender self-identification since 2018)
Third gender option	Yes (Since 2023)
Transgender athletes allowed to participate in single-sex sports	No (Banned since 2026)
Transgender people allowed to use restrooms and other gender-segregated spaces that correspond with their gender identity	Yes / No (Banned in Campina Grande since 2020)
Conversion therapy by medical professionals banned	Yes (Since 1999 for homosexuals and since 2018 for transgender people)
Access to IVF for lesbians	Yes (Since 2013)
Commercial surrogacy for gay male couples	No (Banned for any couple regardless of sexual orientation)
MSMs allowed to donate blood	Yes (Since 2020)
