= LGBTQ rights in Pará =

- Legal status: Legal since 1830, age of consent equalised
- Gender identity: Gender change allowed, official standard for altering legal sex doesn't require surgery since 2018
- Military: Allowed to serve openly
- Discrimination protections: Yes, since 2007 for sexual orientation; since 2019 for gender identity

Family rights
- Recognition of relationships: Same-sex marriage since 2012
- Adoption: Legal since 2012

Lesbian, gay, bisexual, and transgender and queer (LGBTQ) people in the Brazilian state of Pará enjoys many of the same legal protections available to non-LGBTQ people. Homosexuality is legal in the state since 1830.

== Legality ==
In 1830, Brazilian Emperor Pedro I sanctioned the Imperial Penal Code, removing all references to sodomy from Brazilian law.

On December 21, 2011, a court in Belém authorized the adoption of a two-year-old child by a lesbian couple.

On June 28, 2012, in the state of Pará, 28 same-sex couples got married in a ceremony, that took place in Belém.

== Discrimination protections ==
Since 2007, through a constitutional amendment, the Constitution of the State of Pará prohibits discrimination based on sexual orientation. In 2019, discrimination based on gender identity was banned through a decision by the Supreme Federal Court.

On April 21, 2009, the Governor of Pará Ana Julia Carepa signed Law No. 7,261, which establishes the State Day to Combat Homophobia (Portuguese: Dia Estadual de Combate à Homofobia).

On June 11, 2024, the Governor Helder Barbalho signed Law No. 10,570, which establishes the State Day of Bisexual Visibility (Portuguese: Dia Estadual da Visibilidade Bissexual).

On April 8, 2024, the Governor Helder Barbalho signed Decree No. 3,831, which establishes the State Council for Sexual Diversity, part of the State Secretariat for Racial Equality and Human Rights (SEIRDH).

== Gender identify and expression ==
In 2008, the State Department of Education (SEDUC) published Decree no. 016, which guarantees the right of transgender people to use their social name in schools.

On June 21, 2025, Ember Alves Oliveira became the first person in the state to obtain a birth certificate with an "X" sex marker, through an action by the Public Defender's Office of the State of Pará (DPE-PA). The Public Defender's Office sent an official letter to the registry office in Ananindeua requesting the rectification of Ember's name and gender. However, the request for a gender change was denied based on Provision No. 73 of the National Council of Justice (CNJ), which does not provide for a third gender option. The change of first name was also denied, without any legal justification. Faced with repeated refusals from the registry office, the Public Defender's Office filed a lawsuit to obtain the rectification. The institution emphasized that maintaining documentation that does not reflect gender identity represents "a source of suffering and anguish, which constitutes a violation of human dignity."

On July 14, 2026, the governor of Pará, Hana Ghassan (MDB), signed a law authorizing religious temples and schools to restrict bathroom use based on biological sex. Before the law was enacted, the Federal Public Prosecutor's Office had recommended that the governor veto it, arguing that it would violate the rights of transgender people and the principle of secularism. On July 15, 2026, the Socialism and Liberty Party announced that it had filed a lawsuit against the law.

== Summary table ==
Same-sex sexual activity legal	Yes (Since 1830)
Equal age of consent	Yes (Since 1830)
Anti-discrimination laws in employment only	Yes (Since 2007 for sexual orientation; Since 2019 for gender identity)
Anti-discrimination laws in the provision of goods and services	Yes (Since 2007 for sexual orientation; Since 2019 for gender identity)
Anti-discrimination laws in all other areas (Incl. indirect discrimination, hate speech)	Yes (Since 2007 for sexual orientation; Since 2019 for gender identity)
Transgender people allowed to use restrooms and other gender-segregated spaces that correspond with their gender identity	Yes / No (Religious temples and religious schools have been authorized to ban people from using restrooms based on their gender identity since 2026)
Same-sex marriages	Yes (Since 2013)
Recognition of same-sex couples	Yes (Since 2012)
Stepchild adoption by same-sex couples	Yes (Since 2010)
Joint adoption by same-sex couples	Yes (Since 2010)
LGBTQ people allowed to serve openly in the military	Yes
Right to change legal gender	Yes (Since 2008; gender self-identification since 2018)
Third gender option	Yes / No (Only in a specific case)
Conversion therapy by medical professionals banned	Yes (Since 1999 for homosexuals and since 2018 for transgender people)
Access to IVF for lesbians	Yes (Since 2013)
Commercial surrogacy for gay male couples	No (Banned for any couple regardless of sexual orientation)
MSMs allowed to donate blood	Yes (Since 2020)
