= LGBTQ rights in Tocantins =

- Legal status: Legal since 1830, age of consent equalised
- Gender identity: Gender change allowed, official standard for altering legal sex doesn't require surgery since 2018
- Military: Allowed to serve openly
- Discrimination protections: Yes, since 2019

Family rights
- Recognition of relationships: Same-sex marriage since 2013
- Adoption: Legal since 2010

Lesbian, gay, bisexual, transgender and queer (LGBTQ) people in the Brazilian state of Tocantins enjoy many of the same legal protections available to non-LGBTQ people. Homosexuality is legal in the state.

== Legality ==
Same-sex sexual activity has been legal in Brazil since 1830.

Same-sex marriage has been legal in Tocantins since 2013 via a decision by the National Council of Justice, in compliance with a previous decision of the Supreme Federal Court in 2011.

Since 2010, same-sex adoption has been officially permitted in the state through a decision by the Supreme Federal Court.

== Hate crimes and discrimination law ==
There is no state law against discrimination against LGBT people in Tocantins.

In 2019, discrimination based on sexual orientation and gender identity was banned through a decision by the Supreme Federal Court.

== Gender identity and expression ==
The Supreme Federal Court of Brazil ruled on 1 March 2018, that a transgender person has the right to change their official name and sex without the need of surgery or professional evaluation, just by self-declaration of their psychosocial identity.

In August 2022, the Public Defender's Office of Tocantins submitted a request to the state's General Inspectorate of Justice to authorize the inclusion of the term "non-binary" in documents.

In 2023, the General Inspectorate of Justice published a resolution authorizing non-binary individuals to change their documents to include a third gender option.

On 29 January 2026—National Trans Visibility Day in Brazil—the state Public Defender's Office published an article explaining the process for trans people to change their names and gender markers in their documents.

== Education ==
On 14 March 2016, the mayor of Palmas, Carlos Amastha (PSB), signed a provisional measure (Brazilian Portuguese: medida provisória) amending Law No. 2,238 to ban the use of teaching materials on sexual diversity in the city's schools. On the 15th, the City Council voted to uphold the measure.

On 27 August 2018, Supreme Court Justice Luís Roberto Barroso issued an injunction suspending the measure.

On 26 January 2021, Councilman Filipe Martins (PL) introduced a bill in the Palmas City Council to ban gender-neutral language in the city's schools. The City Council approved the bill on 14 December 2022, and it was vetoed by Mayor Cinthia Ribeiro (PSDB) on 15 February 2023. On 22 March 2023, the City Council voted to uphold the mayor's veto.
