= Rodrigo Valadares =

Brazilian politician (born 1989)

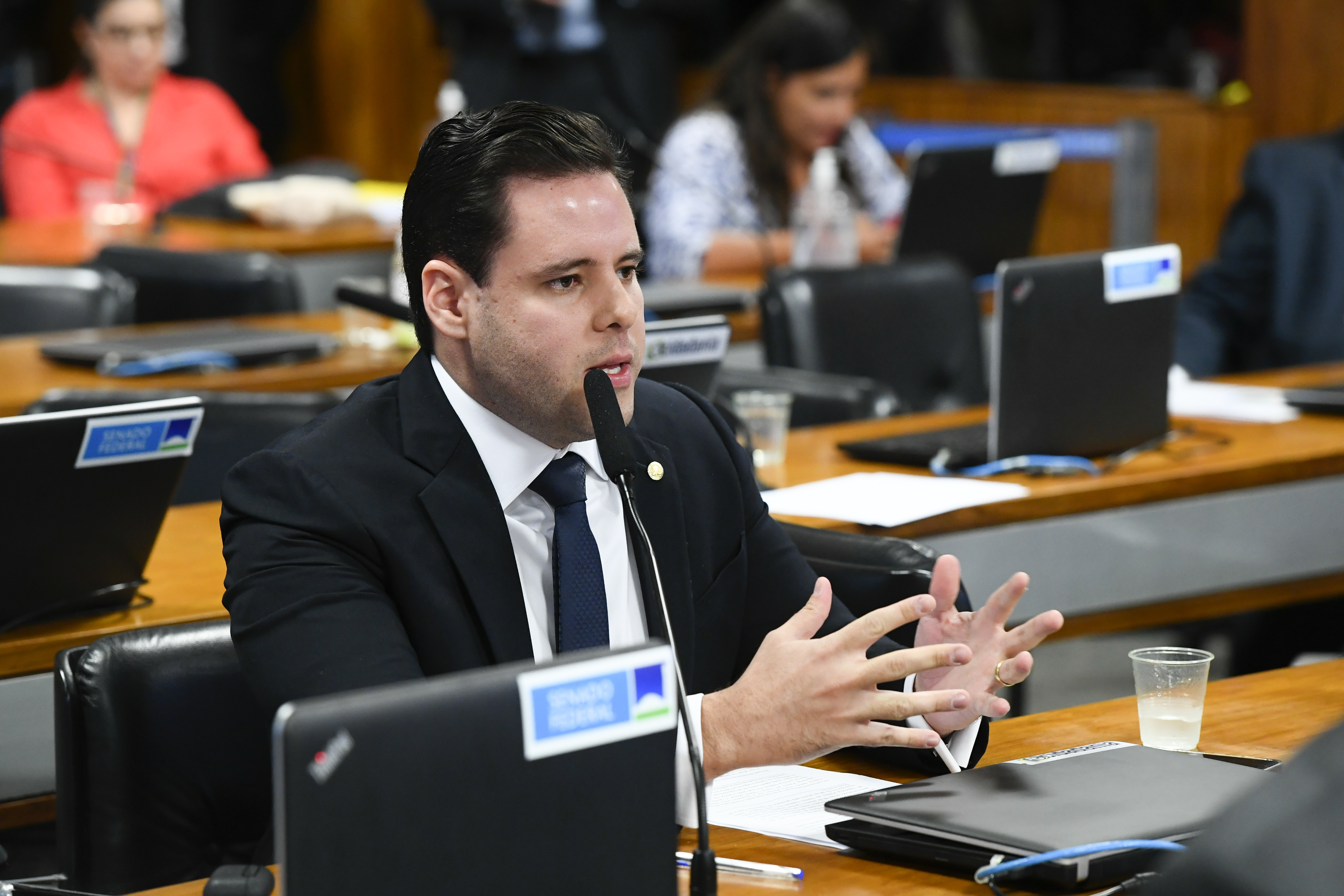
- Valadares in 2023

Member of the Chamber of Deputies
- Incumbent
- Assumed office 1 February 2023
- Constituency: Sergipe

Personal details
- Born: 6 August 1989 (age 37)
- Party: Brazil Union (since 2022)
- Parent: Pedro Valadares (father)

Rodrigo Santana Valadares (born 6 August 1989) is a Brazilian politician serving as a member of the Chamber of Deputies since 2023. From 2019 to 2022, he was a member of the Legislative Assembly of Sergipe. He is the son of Pedro Valadares.
