= Robeyoncé Lima =

Brazilian politician

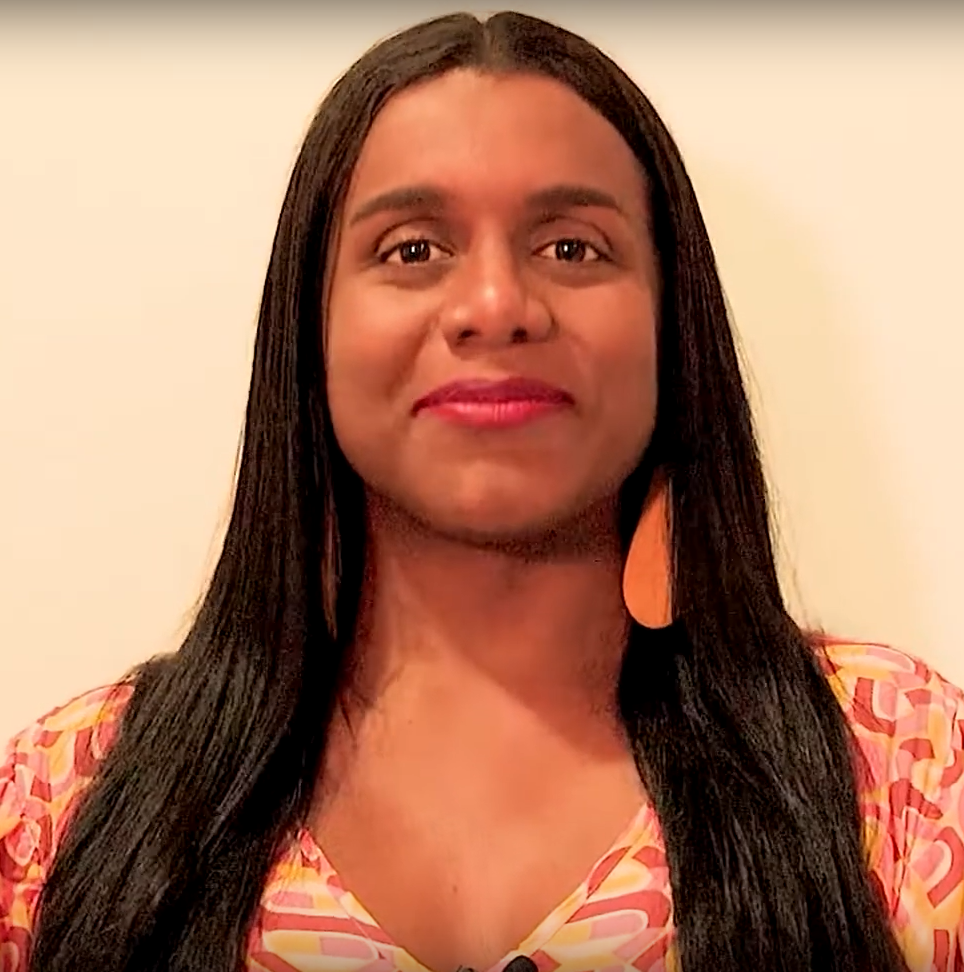
- Constituency: Pernambuco

Personal details
- Born: Recife, Pernambuco, Brazil
- Party: PSOL (2016–present)
- Education: Federal University of Pernambuco
- Occupation: Lawyer, activist and politician
- Website: Robeyoncé Lima

Robeyoncé Lima is a Brazilian lawyer, activist, and politician. She was elected state deputy for Pernambuco in 2018 and is the first trans woman elected official in the state. She was elected as part of the collective candidacy of JUNTAS 50180, which includes Carol Vergolino, Joelma Carla, Kátia Cunha, and Jô Cavalcanti. Her stated legislative goals center public safety, particularly for trans women. She has spoken out against Bolsonaro's negative comments about sexual minorities and the "intensification of oppression" that has occurred since his election.

Lima is Afro-Brazilian and was born in Recife and raised in Pernambuco. She received her law degree from the Federal University of Pernambuco and currently works at the university. After passing the bar, she provided legal advocacy to LGBTQ people, frequently pro bono. She is the first trans woman to practice law in Pernambuco.

== Biography ==
Born in Recife, Robeyoncé Lima was a student in the Pernambuco state public school system. During her childhood, she faced family problems and was abandoned by her father, who was addicted to crack cocaine. Her mother was a domestic worker and, due to her heavy workload, couldn't spend much time with Lima, who was cared for by her grandmother. In an interview, she said that she used to be rejected by other children for being different, which is why she started reading comic books as a hobby.

Lima graduated in law at the age of 27 from the Federal University of Pernambuco, an institution she described as "a breezy environment where she could develop." During her studies, she interned at various public institutions, such as the Federal Court and Petrobras.

In 2016, the Recife Law School named her graduating class Turma Robeyoncé Lima in her honor. This fact received national media attention, raising the profile of the recent graduate in society. At the time, Lima stated that her graduation represented an exception to the rule.

In 2017, she passed the OAB exam and became the first transgender woman to practice law in the North and Northeast regions of Brazil.

== Activism ==
=== Collective candidacy Juntas ===
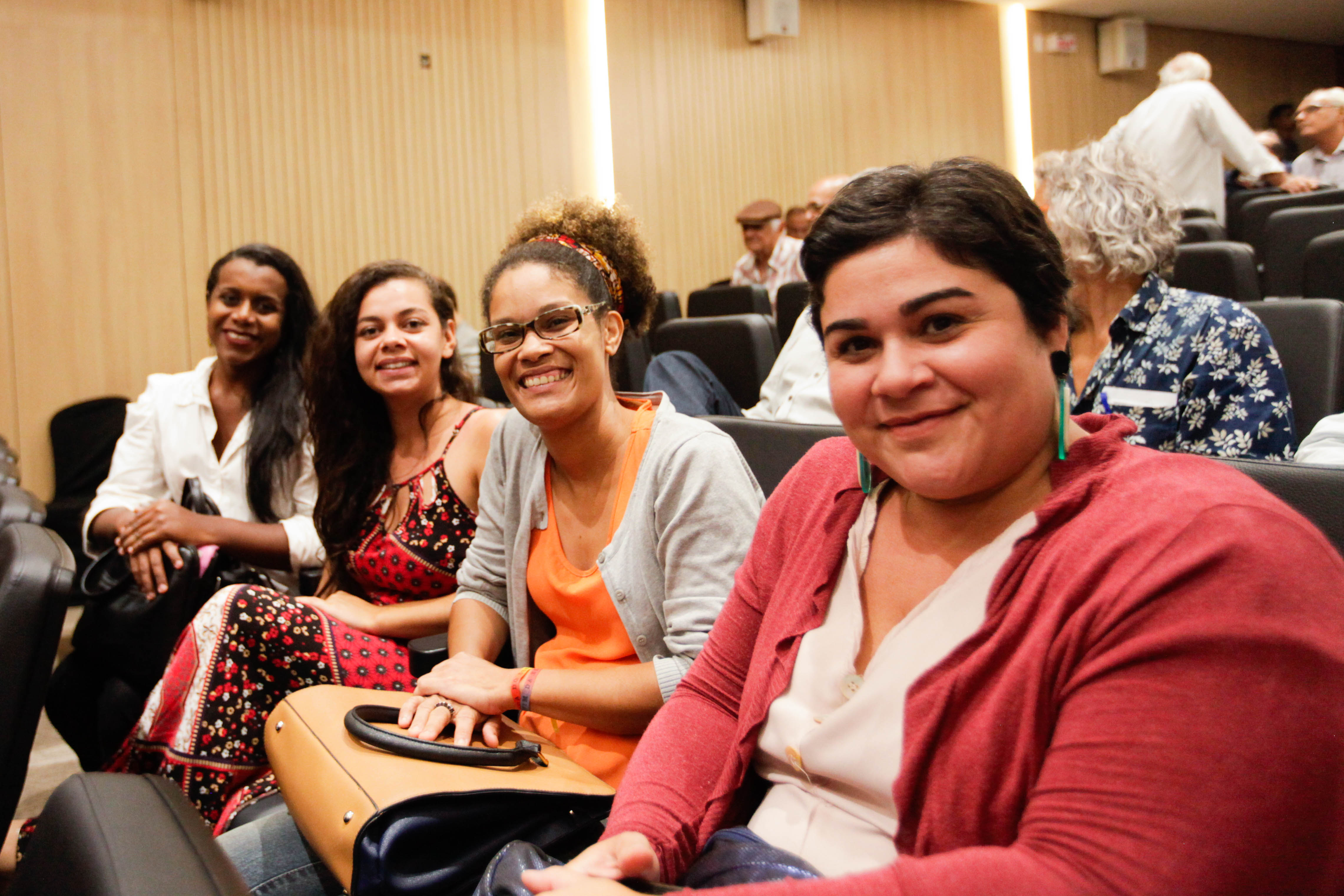
Robeyoncé (left) and other members of the Juntas candidacy at the Legislative Assembly (2019).

In 2018, she launched her campaign as a member of the collective candidacy Juntas, headed by Jô Cavalcanti, who was elected as a state deputy in the Legislative Assembly of Pernambuco after receiving 39,000 votes. Due to the success of the collective candidacy in the election, Lima was described as the first transgender woman to be part of a state-level collective candidacy.

Although she was not officially sworn in as a state representative, Lima was referred to as a "state co-representative" by the press and, during the collective candidacy, stated that she would focus her efforts on improving public safety in Pernambuco, in order to guarantee the safety of LGBTQIA+ people and, in particular, the defense of transgender and travesti people.

After taking office, the candidacy sought to build public policies focused on women, LGBTQIA+ people, and social movements in Pernambuco. The candidacy's decisions were guided by the five members, represented by Jô Cavalcanti, who chaired the Human Rights and Popular Participation Committee of the Legislative Assembly of Pernambuco with the aim of strengthening anti-discrimination policies.

=== Criticism of Jair Bolsonaro and transphobia ===
In 2019, Lima spoke out against Jair Bolsonaro's discriminatory comments about sexual minorities and the "intensification of oppression" that has taken place since the former president came to power. When questioned about the derogatory comments she received on social media, Lima responded that these demonstrate the trivialization of violence against transgender people.

In interviews, Lima stated that Brazil has been at the top of the ranking for assaults and deaths against transgender people for over 10 years. According to her:

Through education, we will begin to be seen as normal people. What we want most is the right to be [...]

=== International impact and the establishment of the Global Equality Caucus at the United Nations ===
On 21 June 2019, at the United Nations headquarters in New York, she was one of the founders of the Global Equality Caucus, an international network of parliamentarians engaged in combating discrimination against LGBTQIA+ people. Along with a delegation of legislative members from various countries, Lima signed the New York Declaration in support of minority rights.

Given the impact of her work as an activist, Lima has been invited by international media to give interviews about the issues she advocates for.

Lima's trajectory and statements were reported by various media outlets based outside of Brazil, such as the US magazine Ms. Magazine, the Reuters agency and the Argentine newspaper La Nación.

=== Vice-President of the Special Truth Commission on Black Slavery in Brazil ===
In June 2022, Lima was sworn in as vice-president of the Special Truth Commission on Black Slavery in Brazil, established by the Pernambuco section of the Brazilian Bar Association. The commission's objective is to discuss the responsibilities for the events that took place during slavery, as a way to support and strengthen public policies for racial equity.

=== Candidacy for federal deputy ===
In the 2022 elections, she ran for federal deputy for Pernambuco, obtaining approximately 80,000 votes. Lima was not elected due to the electoral quotient. During the campaign, she raised issues such as the fight against racism, sexism, LGBTphobia, workers' rights, among other causes.
