= LGBTQ topics in Brazil =

LGBTQ topics in Brazil include:

- LGBTQ culture in Brazil
- LGBTQ history in Brazil
- LGBTQ literature in Brazil
- LGBTQ movements in Brazil
- LGBTQ people in Brazil
- LGBTQ rights in Brazil
  - Acre
  - Alagoas
  - Amapá
  - Amazonas
  - Bahia
  - Ceará
  - Espírito Santo
  - Federal District
  - Goiás
  - Mato Grosso
  - Mato Grosso do Sul
  - Minas Gerais
  - Pará
  - Paraíba
  - Paraná
  - Pernambuco
  - Piauí
  - Rio de Janeiro
  - Rio Grande do Norte
  - Rio Grande do Sul
  - Rondônia
  - Roraima
  - São Paulo
  - Santa Catarina
  - Sergipe
  - Tocantins
- LGBTQ tourism in Brazil
- Same-sex adoption in Brazil
- Same-sex immigration policy in Brazil
- Same-sex marriage in Brazil
