= Anti-discrimination laws in Brazil =

Anti-discrimination laws in Brazil are present in the Constitution of Brazil, in the labour law, in the child and adolescent law, in the ageing law, and in the penal code.

The Brazilian Constitution prohibits all forms of discrimination (age, race, color, national origin, disability, religion, sex, marital status, political affiliation, pregnancy, gender identity, sexual orientation, gender and citizenship) by federal and state governments and the country's population.

== Labour law ==
=== Discriminatory practices ===
Article 1: It is prohibited the adoption of discriminatory practices and for the purpose of limiting access to the employment relationship, or its maintenance by reason of sex, origin, race, colour, marital status, family status or age, except in this case the chances of child protection provided for in paragraph XXXIII art. 7 of the Federal Constitution.

=== Penalty ===
Article 2: the following discriminatory practices constitute a crime:

I - the requirement for testing, examination, investigation, report, certificate, statement or any other procedure relating to sterilization or pregnancy status; II - the adoption of any measure, an initiative of the employer who configure;

a) induce or incite genetic sterilization; b) promotion of birth control, thus not considered offering advice or services and family planning, conducted by public or private institutions, subject to the rules of the Unified Health System (SUS).

Penalty: imprisonment from one to two years and fine.

Single Paragraph. Are active subjects of the crimes referred to in this article:

I - the individual employer; II - the legal representative of the employer, as defined in labor laws; III - the official, directly or by delegation of public and government authorities direct, indirect and foundational to any of the powers of the Union, States, Federal District and Municipalities.

=== Fine ===
Article 3: Notwithstanding the provisions of article previous violations of this law are liable to combinations of the following:

I - administrative fine of ten times the value of the highest salary paid by the employer, in fifty percent higher in case of recidivism; II - prohibition on loans or obtain funding from government financial institutions.

=== Readmission ===
Article 4: The severance of the employment relationship by discriminatory act, under the terms of this law, gives the employee a choice between:

I - readmission to provide full compensation for any period of absence, upon payment of remunerations, corrected monetarily, plus legal interest; II - the perception, double, the remuneration of the cooling off period, adjusted for inflation and plus statutory interest.

== Child and adolescent law ==
=== Preliminary provisions ===
Article 5: No child or adolescent will be subject to any form of neglect, discrimination, exploitation, violence, cruelty and oppression, be punished as any violation of law, by act or omission, their fundamental rights.

=== The rights ===
Article 15: Children and adolescents have the right to freedom, respect and dignity as human persons in the development process and as subjects of civil, human and social rights guaranteed in the Constitution and laws.

Article 17: The right to respect consists in the inviolability of physical, mental and moral development of children and adolescents, including the preservation of image, identity, autonomy, values, ideas and beliefs, and personal spaces.

Section 18: It is the duty of ensuring the dignity of all children and adolescents, putting them safe from any inhuman, violent, terrifying, harassing or embarrassing.

=== Prevention ===
Article 70: It is the duty of all to prevent the occurrence or threat of violation of rights of children and adolescents.

Article 71: Children and adolescents have the right to information, culture, leisure, sports, entertainment, shows and products and services that meet the specific condition of a developing person.

Article 72: The obligations under this Law shall not exclude other special prevention under the principles adopted by it.

Article 73: Failure to meet standards for preventing import of responsibility of the person or entity under this Act.

== Ageing law ==
=== Preliminary provisions ===
Article 4: The No subject shall be subjected to any kind of negligence, discrimination, violence, cruelty or oppression, and any violation of their rights by action or omission, shall be punished as provided by law.

§ 1: It is the duty of all to prevent the threat or violation of the rights of the elderly.

§ 2: The obligations under this Law shall not exclude others deriving from the prevention of principles adopted by it.

Article 5: The failure to meet standards for preventing matter in liability to the person or entity under the law.

Article 6: The every citizen has the duty to notify the competent authority any form of violation of this Law who has witnessed or has knowledge.

=== The rights ===
Article 10: The State and society, to ensure elderly freedom, respect and dignity as human beings and subject to civil, political, individual and social rights, guaranteed in the Constitution and laws.

§ 2: The right to respect consists in the inviolability of physical, mental and moral, including the preservation of image, identity, autonomy, values, ideas and beliefs, of space and personal objects.

§ 3: It is the duty of all protect the dignity of the elderly, putting him safe from any inhuman, violent, terrifying, harassing or embarrassing.

=== Professionalization and the labour ===
Article 26: The elderly are entitled to the exercise of professional activity, respect for their physical, intellectual and psychological.

Article 27: On admission to the elderly in any work or employment, is prohibited from discrimination and the setting of upper age limit, including public examination, except in cases where the nature of the position requires.

Single Paragraph. The first tie-breaker in a public examination is age, with preference being given to the higher age.

Article 28: The Government will create and foster programs:

I - professional expertise to the elderly, taking advantage of their potentials and abilities to regular activities and are paid; II - preparing employees for retirement, with a minimum of 1 year, by stimulating new social projects, according to their interests, and clarification on social rights and citizenship; III - to encourage private companies to admission of the elderly to work.

=== Crimes in general ===
Article 96: Discriminate against the elderly by preventing or hindering their access to banking facilities, means of transport, the right to hire or by any other means or instrument necessary for the exercise of citizenship by reason of age.

Penalty: imprisonment from 6 months to 1 year and a fine.

§ 1: The same penalty who despise, humiliate, belittle or discriminate against the elderly, for any reason.

§ 2: The penalty will be increased from 1/3 if the victim is under the care or responsibility of the agent.

Article 97: Failure to assist the elderly, when possible to do so without personal risk, in situations of imminent danger, or refuse, delay or hamper their health care, without cause, or not to ask these cases, the help of public authority.

Penalty: detention of 6 months to 1 year and a fine.

Single Paragraph. The penalty is increased by half if the omission resulting serious bodily injury, and tripled if death results.

Article 98: Leave the elderly in hospitals, nursing homes, long stay entities, or the like, or do not meet their basic needs, when required by law or court.

Penalty: detention of 6 months to 3 years and fine.

Article 99: Expose to danger the health and wellbeing, physical or mental, the elderly, subjecting him to inhuman or degrading conditions or depriving them of food and care needed when required to do so, or subjecting him to overwork or inadequate.

Penalty: imprisonment from 2 months to 1 year and a fine.

§ 1: If the fact results serious bodily injury.

Penalty: imprisonment of 1 to 4 years.

§ 2: If death results.

Penalty: imprisonment from 4 to 12 years.

Article 100: Constitutes a crime punishable by imprisonment of 6 months to one 1 year and a fine:

I - obstruct someone's access to any public office by reason of age; II - to deny someone because of age, employment or work; III - deny, delay or hamper treatment or fail to provide health care, without cause, the elder; IV - fail to comply, delay or frustrate without due cause, the execution of a court order issued in a civil action to which this Law refers; V - deny, delay or omit the technical data essential to the commencement of civil action object of this Act, when requested by the prosecutor.

Article 101: Failure to comply with, delay or frustrate without due cause, the execution of a court order issued in actions in which it is party or intervener the elderly.

Penalty: imprisonment from 6 months to 1 year and fine.

Article 102: Appropriating or diverting assets, earnings, pension or other income of the elderly, giving them differently from application of its purpose.

Penalty: imprisonment of 1 to 4 years and fine.

Article 103: Denying the host or the elderly to stay as warm, by refusing to grant this authority to the proxy service.

Penalty: detention of 6 months to 1 year and a fine.

Article 104: Hold the magnetic card bank account on benefits, or pension income of the elderly as well as other documents for the purpose of ensuring receipt or recovery of debt.

Penalty: detention of 6 to 2 years and fine.

Article 105: View or vehicle by any means of communication, information or pictures derogatory or insulting the person of aging.

Penalty: detention of 1 to 3 years and fine.

Article 106: Induce elderly without understanding of their acts to grant powers of attorney for asset management or dispose of them.

Penalty: 2 to 4 years.

Article 107: Coerce, in any event, the senior to donate, recruit, test, or grant powers of attorney.

Penalty: imprisonment from 2 to 5 years.

Article 108: Plow notarial act involving elder undiscerning of their acts without proper legal representation.

Penalty: imprisonment from 2 to 4 years.

== LGBTQ people ==
The states of Brazil are prohibited from creating discriminatory laws, according to the national Constitution. While the Constitution prohibits discrimination on a variety of characteristics, such as "origin, race, sex, colour [and] age", sexual orientation is not explicitly mentioned. The Constitution does forbid "any other forms of discrimination".

Traditional images of Latin America "machismo" and the resulting homophobia are changing now that individual rights, including one's right in accordance with one's sexual orientation, enjoy the protection of the law. Brazil adopted a liberal Constitution in 1988, and continues to provide more protections for all of its citizens. Shortly after electing Luiz Inácio Lula da Silva as Brazil's president, various states took serious measures ensuring that no one would be discriminated against because of their sexual orientation. As of 2003, discrimination on the basis of sexual orientation was prohibited in 73 municipal statutes. Provisions were later enacted in the laws and regulations of the states of Acre (2017), Alagoas (2001/13), Amapá (2009), Amazonas (2006), Bahia (2007/14), the Brazilian Federal District (1997/17), Ceará (2009/14), Espírito Santo (2012/16), Goiás (2008), Mato Grosso (1989/17), Mato Grosso do Sul (2005), Maranhão (2006), Minas Gerais (2002), Pará (2007), Paraíba (2003/17), Paraná (2013), Pernambuco (2012/13), Piauí (2004/17), Rio de Janeiro (2000/10), Rio Grande do Norte (2007), Rio Grande do Sul (2002/16), Rondônia (2018), Roraima (2013), Santa Catarina (2002), São Paulo (2001), Sergipe (1989/2025), and Tocantins (2013). These policies vary by state. Some states (Alagoas, Bahia, the Brazilian Federal District, Ceará, Espírito Santo, Mato Grosso, Pará, Santa Catarina, and Sergipe) list sexual orientation among the non-discrimination grounds in their state constitutions. Sergipe is the first and only Brazilian state to ban discrimination based on gender identity in its constitution. Several states have also established public taskforces and commissions to investigate reports of discrimination. Legal prohibitions of discrimination against transgender people varies from state to state. Many states enacted protections for gender identity at the same time as for sexual orientation, while others did so some years later. As of 2019, Amapá, Minas Gerais, Pará, and Santa Catarina do not address discrimination against transgender people.

... the law shall include penalties of an administrative, economic and financial nature for entities that discriminate based on national origin, race, color, sex, age, marital status, religious belief, sexual orientation or political or philosophical beliefs, or any other status, regardless of the judicial measures provided for by law. (Note: Portuguese: ... a lei cominará sanções de natureza administrativa, econômica e financeira a entidades que incorrerem em discriminação por motivo de origem, raça, cor, sexo, idade, estado civil, crença religiosa, orientação sexual ou de convicção política ou filosófica, e de outras quaisquer formas, independentemente das medidas judiciais previstas em lei;)

— Constituição do Estado de Santa Catarina.

The State and Municipalities shall ensure, within their territory and within the limits of their competence, the fullness and guarantee of the rights and social principles provided for in the Federal Constitution and in the international treaties in force in [Brazil], including those concerning urban, rural workers and public servants, as well as the prohibition of discrimination based on religious belief or sexual orientation. (Note: Portuguese: O Estado e os Municípios assegurarão, em seu território e nos limites de sua competência, a plenitude e a inviolabilidade dos direitos e garantias sociais e princípios previstos na Constituição Federal e nos tratados internacionais vigentes em nossa Pátria, inclusive as concernentes aos trabalhadores urbanos, rurais e servidores públicos, bem como os da vedação de discriminação por motivo de crença religiosa ou orientação sexual.)

— Constituição do Estado do Espírito Santo.

No one shall be discriminated against or harmed by reason of birth, age, ethnicity, race, color, sex, genetic characteristics, marital status, rural or urban work, religion, political or philosophical beliefs, sexual orientation, physical, immunological, sensory or mental disability, in accordance with the Federal Constitution. (Note: Portuguese: Ninguém será discriminado ou prejudicado em razão de nascimento, idade, etnia, raça, cor, sexo, características genéticas, estado civil, trabalho rural ou urbano, religião, convicções políticas ou filosóficas, orientação sexual, deficiência física, imunológica, sensorial ou mental, por ter cumprido pena, nem por qualquer particularidade ou condição, observada a Constituição Federal.)

— Lei Orgânica do Distrito Federal

On November 30, 2000, the City Council of Niterói, in the state of Rio de Janeiro, passed an ordinance prohibiting discrimination based on sexual orientation in public places and institutions as well as in businesses. Many Brazilian cities and states have anti-discriminatory legislation that explicitly includes sexual orientation. Some of them provide specific sanctions and penalties for those who engage in discrimination.

In 2007, the Ministry of Labour and Employment issued Executive Order (Portaria) No. 41/2007, which prohibits employers from requesting documents or information related to an employee's sexuality.

A 2008 survey found that 70% of Brazilians were in favour of banning discrimination against LGBTQ people. Divided by religion, 54% of Evangelicals supported banning such discrimination, while 70% of Catholics and 79% of atheists also expressed support. Those aged between 16 and 30 were also more likely to support legislation to ban LGBTQ discrimination.

As of 2019, a federal anti-discrimination law is pending approval on the Brazilian Senate. The Constitution does not have any specific laws on discrimination based on sexual orientation, but it does have a generic anti-discrimination article that can be considered to include such cases. This fact is constantly used by the opposition of the anti-discrimination law to show that there is no need for specific laws. The defenders of the new law, however, argue that without clear designation, this will still be considered somewhat of a lesser crime. Some conservative Catholic and Protestant senators argue that the law would be an aggression on religious freedom granted by the Constitution. Senator Fátima Cleide (PT–RO) said that the law should be approved because "the country has the tragic mark that a homosexual is murdered every two days." Former Evangelical priest and Senator Marcelo Crivella (PRB–RJ) criticized the text, saying homosexuals will receive a protection that "should have been given to women, the elderly and children." In March 2018, the Senate Constitution and Justice Commission approved the federal anti-discrimination law. The bill would need to be approved by the full Senate and Chamber of Deputies before becoming law.

In February 2019, the Federal Supreme Court (Supremo Tribunal Federal) began proceedings to criminalize homophobia and transphobia. The court handed down its ruling on May 23, criminalizing homophobia and transphobia under the country's anti-racism law (Portuguese: Lei do Crime Racial - Lei n.º 7.716/1989). Six of the Supreme Court's 11 judges voted in favor of the measure, while the five other judges were granted more time to make their decision. Eventually, on 13 June, the Supreme Court issued its final ruling, in an 8–3 vote. Judge Luiz Fux described homophobic crimes as "alarming" and an "epidemic".

== Afro-Brazilian and indigenous peoples ==
The Afro-Brazilian and Indigenous History and Culture Law (Law No. 11.645/2008) is a Brazilian law mandating the teaching of Afro-Brazilian and Indigenous History and Culture which was passed and entered into effectiveness on March 10, 2008. It amends Law No. 9.394, of December 20, 1996, modified by Law No. 10.639, of January 9, 2003, which established the guidelines and bases of Brazilian national education, to include in the official curriculum of the education system the mandatory theme of Afro-Brazilian and Indigenous History and Culture.

== See also ==
- List of anti-discrimination acts
- Labour law
- Criminal law
- Constitutional law
- Anti-discrimination law
- Employment discrimination law in the United States
- Employment discrimination law in the United Kingdom
