= Transgender rights in Brazil =

Transgender rights in Brazil include the right to change one's legal name and sex without the need of surgery or professional evaluation, and the right to sex reassignment surgery provided by Brazil's public health service, the Sistema Único de Saúde. According to data from 2015 to 2025 from Nexus – Research and Data Intelligence, 664 bills on transgender rights were introduced in the country, with 416 in favor and 248 against.

Brazil transgender flag

== Gender recognition ==
=== History ===
Before 2009

In 1993, the first Brazilian national meeting was held among transgender individuals. This meeting was known as the National Meeting of Travestis and Liberated People. By 1995, gay and lesbian national meetings were being attended by transgender activist groups. Then, in 1996, the National Meeting of Travestis and Liberated People Fighting Against AIDS was held.

Brazil participated in the drafting of the Statement on Human Rights, Sexual Orientation and Gender Identity. This document was presented in December 2008. Brazil helped organize the launch of the Yogyakarta Principles in 2007.

==== Since 2009 ====
Changing legal gender assignment in Brazil is legal according to the Superior Court of Justice of Brazil, as stated in a decision rendered on 17 October 2009.

Unanimously, the 3rd Class of the Superior Court of Justice approved allowing the option of name and gender change on the birth certificate of a transgender person who has undergone sex reassignment surgery.

The understanding of the ministers was that it made no sense to allow people to have such surgery performed in the free federal health system and not allow them to change their name and gender in the civil registry.

The ministers followed the vote of the rapporteur, Nancy Andrighi, who argued that "if Brazil consents to the possibility of surgery, it should also provide the means for the individual to have a decent life in society". In the opinion of the rapporteur, preventing the record change for a transgender person who has gone through sex reassignment surgery could constitute a new form of social prejudice, and cause more psychological instability. She explained:

"The issue is delicate. At the beginning of compulsory civil registry, distinction between the two sexes was determined according to the genitalia. Today there are other influential factors, and that identification can no longer be limited to the apparent sex. There is a set of social, psychological problems that must be considered. Vetoing this exchange would be putting the person in an untenable position, subject to anxieties, uncertainty, and more conflict."

According to Minister João Otávio de Noronha of the Superior Court of Justice, transgender people should have their social integration ensured with respect to their dignity, autonomy, intimacy and privacy, which must therefore incorporate their civil registry.

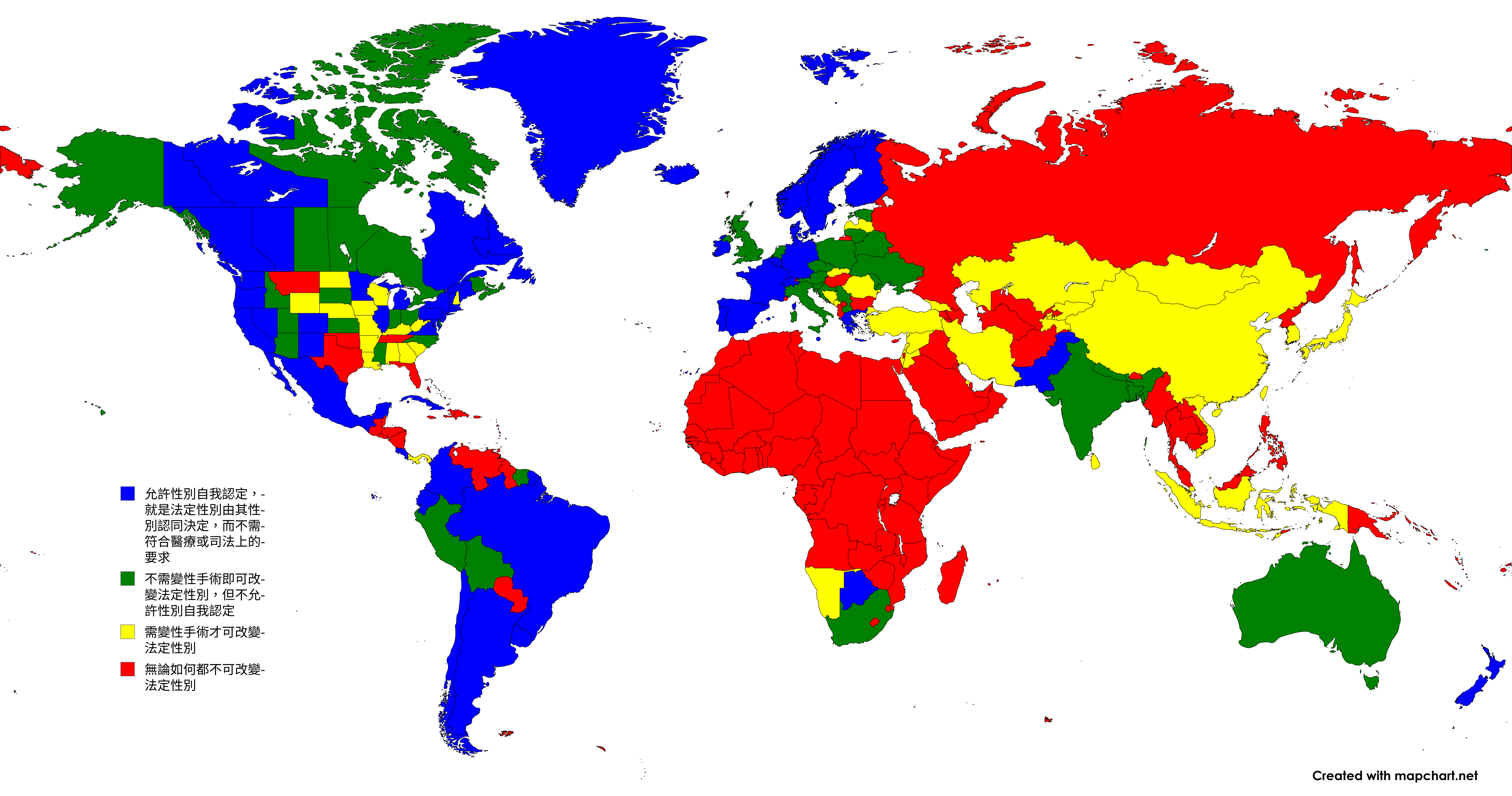
Laws concerning gender identity-expression by country or territory in 2025: Gender self-identification Legal identity change, surgery not required, but not gender self-identification Legal identity change, surgery required No legal identity change

==== Since 2018 ====
The Supreme Federal Court ruled on 1 March 2018, that a transgender person has the right to change their official name and sex without the need of surgery or professional evaluation, just by self-declaration of their psychosocial identity. On 29 June, the Corregedoria Nacional de Justiça, a body of the National Justice Council published the rules to be followed by registry offices concerning the subject.

In 2020, a study was conducted to understand the quality of life of Brazilian transgender children. 32 participants were involved in the study, and they were either interviewed or placed into focus groups to gather their perspective.

=== Social name ===
The term social name (Brazilian Portuguese: nome social) is the designation by which someone identifies and is socially recognized, replacing the name given at birth or civil registry. At the federal level, the main law that guarantees the use of the corporate name is from April 2016. This decree regulated the use of the social name by bodies and entities of the direct, autonomous, and foundational federal public administration. This includes bodies such as the INSS, Receita Federal (CPF), hospitals and universities. Since then, the social name has been recognized in various contexts, including the SUS, banks, and education systems.

=== Non-binary recognition ===
Federative units that legally recognize a non-binary gender (July 2025) Recognized by provision Recognition through judicial action No legal recognition

There is no recognition of a third gender option nationwide, but since 2020 non-binary and intersex people have been getting court authorizations to register their sex as "unspecified", "non-identified", "intersex", or "non-binary" in the civil registry.

For the purpose of filling out and printing the Identity Card, the gender field must follow the ICAO standardization, with 1 character, M, F or X (for non-binary people). Since January 11, 2024, issuing bodies in the States and the Federal District have been obliged to adopt these Identity Card standards established by the Federal Government. The information in the gender field can be self-determined and self-declared by the person when filling in the data, at the Identification Institutes. In the current context, of the 3,502,816 IDs issued, there are 192 National Identity Cards, that is, 0.0005% defined in the gender field as "X".

While requesting a new passport, Brazilians are able to select an unspecified sex. According to the Federal Police, the body responsible for issuing Brazilian passports, in response to the requirement for access to registered information, the "not specified" option, in these terms, was implemented in the application form passport application in 2007, with the advent of the "New Passport", popularly known as the "blue cape model". Before that, however, the option already existed, and was declared on printed and typed forms in the old "cover model" notebooks green". Following the international standard, the "unspecified" option is represented in the passport with the letter X, instead of the letters M or F, for male or female, respectively. The gender option contained in the passport must reflect the information expressed in the birth certificate or other official identification document. I.e, whenever the information expressed on the certificate is different from "male" or "female", the alternative will be used. The use of option X, or "not specified", comes from the international standard ICAO (International Civil Aviation Organization), which specifies the printing of the "Gender of the holder" by "use of the initial letter commonly used in the country of origin", being "capital letter F for feminine, M for masculine, or X for unspecified". Following ICAO standards, among others, is precisely what confers recognition of a passport by other countries.

Since 12 September 2021, by decision of the National Justice Council, notaries must register intersex children with the sex ignored on birth certificates.

The state of Rio de Janeiro, thanks to the work of the State Public Defender's Office, has been allowing non-binary people to register their birth certificates and identity cards with the "non-binary" gender in gender-neutral language.

On April 22, 2022, Rio Grande do Sul Justice assured non-binary people to change their first name and sex in their birth record, according to their self-perceived identity, regardless of judicial authorization, allowing include the expression "non-binary" in the sex field upon a request made by the interested party to a notary's office.

On May 9, 2022, Bahia Justice published a provision allowing the inclusion of “non-binary” gender in the Civil Registry.

In 2023, Paraíba, Paraná, Tocantins, and Federal District recognized non-binary gender markers. However, in October 2023, the National Justice Council, at the request of the TJES, issued a document precluding "non-binary" as a gender marker. The document quotes Luiz Fux, who claimed that “(…) There is no third gender, nor is this the claim”. In November 2023, TJPR revoked non-binary recognition, establishing that the right to administrative replacement of first name and sex in civil registration does not cover the possibility of expanding genders, limited to “male” and “female”. TJRS, in December 2023, also revoked the provision that recognized non-binary rectification in the state of Rio Grande do Sul.

In January 2024, a public civil action by the Federal Court of Paraná determined that the Federal Revenue must include the options "unspecified", "non-binary" and "intersex" in the sex field of the CPF, guaranteeing the right to rectification to those who interest.

On 6 May 2025, the Superior Court of Justice decided that it is possible to rectify the civil registry to include the neutral gender. The Superior Court's decision only affects the plaintiff, but serves as a precedent that can be followed in similar cases.

Non-binary option on birth certificates, by federative unit
State/District	Recognized?		Date	Notes
State/District	individually	by law	Date	Notes
Acre	Yes	Yes	2025	Government allowed Ariel Sebastos to rectify their gender. Law allows non-binary people to change, however it requires judicial actions still.
Alagoas	Yes	?	2021	Through judicial actions.
Amapá	Yes	?	2022	Positive requests are given for non-binary people to rectify their genders.
Amazonas	?	—		While non-binary people are receiving name change in their documents. But gender options are still binary.
Bahia	Yes	Yes	2022	Without costs, non-binary people can change name and gender statewidely.
Ceará	Yes	—	2024	Notaries allowed to grant non-binary registry. Justice acknowledged in 2024.
Espírito Santo	Yes	?	2024	Justice is allowing people to rectify non-binarily.
Federal District	Yes	Yes	2022	Provision recognizes, and it's possible to rectify directly in notaries.
Goiás	Yes	—	2023	People are receiving positive requests.
Maranhão	Yes	issued	2024	Public Defender is granting non-binary people their rights.
Mato Grosso	?	—		
Mato Grosso do Sul	?	—		
Minas Gerais	Yes	?	2023	Interesteds must be of legal age and present a birth certificate, RG, CPF, voter registration card, and proof of address. Registration is free.
Pará	Yes	?	2025	Judicial actions allow non-binary legal gender.
Paraíba	Yes	Yes	2023	Extrajudicial and administrative acts are allowing anyone to change their gender. Provision exists since 2023.
Paraná	Yes	rerecognized	2021	In 2021, a non-binary person from Foz do Iguaçu changed their sex in civil registry to "indeterminate". Law from 2025 allows registry for sex as "undefined".
Pernambuco	Yes	?	2023	Judicial action recognized.
Piauí	Yes	?	2021	Judicial recognition.
Rio de Janeiro	Yes	—N/a	2020	First effective judicial recognition allowing Aoi Berriel to register their gender as non-binary. And since 2022, non-binary people can change to "não binárie", using gender-neutral neologistic desinence.
Rio Grande do Norte	Yes	Yes	2023	Law from 2023 points individuals can change their gender with no requirements of a reason.
Rio Grande do Sul	Yes	revoked	2021	Collective actions happen since 2021. Recognized through provision since 2022, the law was revoked in 2023.
Rondônia	Yes	?	2022	People can change their gender to non-binary.
Roraima	Yes	?	2025	Free action permits trans and non-binary people to rectify.
Santa Catarina	Yes	?	2020	People from Santa Catarina and residents are receiving documents constating non-binary gender judicially, or directly in notarial offices, however unprescribed from a specific law.
São Paulo	Yes	—N/a	2021	3rd Chamber of Private Law of the TJ/SP authorized the change of the civil registry, favorabilizing the inclusion of the terms "non-binary", "agender", and/or "unspecified" in the "sex" field.
Sergipe	Yes	Yes	2025	Law recognizes non-binary people.
Tocantins	Yes	Yes	2022	Judiciary provision allows the exclusion of the female or male gender annotation and the inclusion of the expression "non-binary", upon request of the party at the time of the request.

== Transgender healthcare ==
Sistema Único de Saúde (SUS), the public health system in Brazil, provides processo transexualizador (lit. 'Transsexualization process'). This includes psychological counseling, hormone therapy, and sex reassignment surgeries.

Since 2008, the SUS has offered sex reassignment surgeries free of charge, in accordance with a court ruling that recognizes the importance of these procedures for the health and well-being of trans people. In addition, Ordinance No. 2,803 of 2013 redefined and expanded the Transsexualization Process, ensuring a more comprehensive and inclusive approach. And it made adjustments in 2023.

A resolution from Federal Council of Medicine in 2019, after the official releasing of ICD-11 recognized other identity expressions related to gender diversity as part of gender incongruence.

ADPF 787, a case from STF in 2024, ruled that transgender people should have access to traditionally gendered care, such as gynecology and urology, regardless of their gender entry in electronic systems or documents. In the same year, Ministry of Health announced expanding the number of services aimed at the trans population, following resolution of the Federal Council of Medicine. However, right-wing politicians threaten to block the project.

In July 2026, the 3rd Panel of the Superior Court of Justice ruled that health insurance plans are obligated to cover facial feminization surgeries.

=== Healthcare for minors ===
In April 2025, Brazil's Federal Council of Medicine (CFM) passed a resolution banning gender-affirming care for minors, but reduced the age for gender affirming surgical procedures from 25 to 21. As justification for the latter, the CFM cited a new law passed in 2022, which lowered the minimum age limit for sterilization procedures such as tubal ligation and vasectomies in the country from 25 to 21. A few days later, LGBTQ+ advocates filed an ADI (Direct Action of Unconstitutionality) to the Supreme Court in an attempt to get the ban on gender-affirming care for minors overturned. On 25 July 2025, a Federal Court in Acre blocked the Federal Council of Medicine's resolution, restoring gender-affirming care for minors nationwide.

On August 18, the Federal Regional Court of the 1st Region denied the CFM's appeal against the decision. In October, Supreme Court Justice Flávio Dino overturned the Acre court's ruling via an injunction, claiming that the issue should be analyzed by the Supreme Federal Court.

On 17 July 2026, a federal court authorized the use of puberty blockers for a 13-year-old transgender girl. According to Appellate Judge Roger Raupp Rios, the ban cannot be applied to all patients without considering each case individually.

=== Gender reassignment surgery ===
The first male-to-female gender-affirming surgery in Brazil was Performed by Dr. Roberto Farina in the 1970s. He was prosecuted for his actions but was eventually acquitted of all charges in 1979.

In 2008, Brazil's public health system started providing free sex reassignment surgery in compliance with a court order. Federal prosecutors had argued that gender reassignment surgery was covered under a constitutional clause guaranteeing medical care as a basic right.

The Regional Federal Court agreed, saying in its ruling:

"from the biomedical perspective, transsexuality can be described as a sexual identity disturbance where individuals need to change their sexual designation or face serious consequences in their lives, including intense suffering, mutilation and suicide."

Patients must be at least 18 years old and diagnosed as transgender with no personality disorders, and must undergo psychological evaluation with a multidisciplinary team for at least two years, begins with 16 years old. The national average is of 100 surgeries per year, according to the Ministry of Health of Brazil.

== Transgender discrimination ==
Brazil has had the highest amount of transgender murder victims in the world since 2008, making up 40% of all murders of transgender individuals from 2008 to 2018, according to Transgender Europe. There were about 200 homicides of transgender individuals in Brazil in 2017, according to the Brazilian National Transgender Association. More recently, the number of transgender women murdered in Brazil went up 45% in 2020, and in 2022–2023 Brazil made up 31% of recorded killings of transgender people. This has led to the average lifespan of a transgender Brazilian being less than half that of a cisgender Brazilian.

São Paulo city and Belo Horizonte council members Erika Hilton and Duda Salabert, the first transgender woman to be elected to the federal deputies, received death threats and, as a result, had to change her habits for safety reasons.

Professor of psychology Jaqueline Gomes de Jesus has argued that structural and interpersonal violence directed at transgender people in Brazil would satisfy articles 2(a) to 2(d) of the Genocide Convention if this were viewed as genocide.

Activists in Brazil have also described the targeting of transgender people, particularly Afro-Brazilian transgender women, as a genocide. The neologism transgenerocídio (meaning transgendercide) has been adopted as a term used in Brazil to classify transgender genocide.

== Gender quotas ==
As of 2024, one in three universities offer transgender quotas, such as Federal University of Southern Bahia, Federal University of Bahia, Federal University of ABC, Fluminense Federal University, Federal University of Santa Catarina, and University of Brasília.

== See also ==
- Processo transexualizador
- LGBT rights in the Americas
- LGBT rights in Brazil
- Legal status of transgender people
- List of transgender-related topics
