= LGBTQ rights in Rio de Janeiro =

- Legal status: Legal since 1830, age of consent equalised
- Gender identity: Gender change allowed, official standard for altering legal sex doesn't require surgery since 2018
- Military: Allowed to serve openly
- Discrimination protections: Explicit legal protection nationwide

Family rights
- Recognition of relationships: Same-sex marriage since 2013
- Adoption: Legal since 2010

Lesbian, gay, bisexual, transgender and queer (LGBTQ) people in the Brazilian state of Rio de Janeiro enjoy many of the same legal protections available to non-LGBTQ people. Same-sex marriage is legal in the state since 2013.

== Legality ==
In 1830, Brazilian Emperor Dom Pedro I sanctioned the Imperial Penal Code, removing all references to sodomy from Brazilian law.

=== Recognition of same-sex unions ===
On 17 April 2013, the General Magistrate of Justice of Rio de Janeiro, Judge Valmir de Oliveira Silva, published a legal ruling authorizing same-sex marriage in the state if local judges agree. Same sex weddings are poised to begin in the coming days. According to the ruling (25/2013), a couples' request must be registered by civil registry officers, who have to give 15 days for the district to decide if they agree. If they don't agree, the marriage cannot proceed.

=== Adoption and parenting ===
- August 24, 2007 - the Justice of the city of Rio de Janeiro authorized the adoption of a child by a lesbian couple.
- May 21, 2009 - the Justice of the city of Rio de Janeiro authorized the adoption of two children by a lesbian couple.
- February 22, 2010 - the Justice of the city of Rio de Janeiro, Rio de Janeiro authorized the adoption of a child by a lesbian couple.

== Gender identity and expression ==
The Supreme Federal Court of Brazil ruled on 1 March 2018, that a transgender person has the right to change their official name and sex without the need of surgery or professional evaluation, just by self-declaration of their psychosocial identity.

In 2020, Rio de Janeiro became the first Brazilian state to authorize a non-binary person to change their gender marker to "unspecified" through a court decision. On 5 April 2022, the Public Defender's Office of the State of Rio de Janeiro announced that non-binary people could change their documents to reflect their gender identity.

=== Bathroom ban in Petrópolis ===
On 11 June 2025, the Petrópolis City Council passed a law banning transgender people from using restrooms according to their gender identity in the city. The bill's author, Councilman Octavio Sampaio (PL), said the law's objective is to "protect the physical and psychological integrity of women, children, and adolescents, ensuring safety and privacy in public restrooms."

On April 17, councilwoman Benny Briolly (PSOL) launched a campaign against the bill.

=== Unisex restrooms ===
On 26 March 2026, the Legislative Assembly of Rio de Janeiro approved a bill by Representative Índia Armelau (PL) to allow the installation of unisex restrooms and changing rooms for transgender, non-binary people, and those who have not undergone gender-affirming surgery.

The bill was criticized by Representative Dani Balbi (PCdoB), who argued that it allowed the segregation of transgender people and recommended that the state governor, Ricardo Couto, veto it.

On 22 June 2026, Couto vetoed the bill, arguing that it would perpetuate segregation.

== Discrimination protections ==
On July 15, 2015, the governor of Rio de Janeiro, Luiz Fernando Pezão, signed Law No. 7041, which prohibits discrimination based on sexual orientation in the state.

Since 2019, discrimination based on gender identity has been prohibited nationwide in Brazil, through a decision by the Supreme Federal Court.

== Censorship ==
In February 2016, the mayor of Nova Iguaçu, Nelson Bomier, signed a law prohibiting the use of educational materials about "sexual diversity" in the city's schools. The law was challenged by the Prosecutor General of the Republic, however, Supreme Court Justice Alexandre de Moraes, the case's rapporteur, denied the continuation of the lawsuit due to legal issues.

=== Comic book case ===
On 4 September 2019, during the Rio de Janeiro Book Biennial, the city's mayor, Marcelo Crivella, ordered the removal of the comic book Avengers: The Children's Crusade because it featured a same-sex couple—the characters Wiccan and Hulkling—kissing. Crivella claimed that the book contained "sexual content for minors" and stated that his decision was intended to "protect children." Following Crivella's order, it was confirmed on September 6 that the book had sold out. That same day, the Rio de Janeiro Court of Justice granted an injunction overturning Crivella's decision. On 7 September 2019, YouTuber Felipe Neto organized an initiative to distribute 10,000 books containing LGBTQ-themed content at the Biennial. On the same day, following an appeal by Crivella, the Chief Judge of the Court, Claudio de Mello Tavares, set aside the previous injunction and authorized the city government to remove the book, asserting that the decision was based on the Statute of the Child and Adolescent. On 8 September 2019, following an appeal by the Prosecutor General of the Republic, Raquel Dodge, the Chief Justice of the Supreme Federal Court, Dias Toffoli, overturned Tavares' decision. Toffoli stated that the move violated the principle of equality. In September 2025, the Rio de Janeiro Court of Justice ordered Crivella to pay 100,000 reais in compensation for collective moral damages. Crivella attempted to appeal, but the Court of Justice denied the appeal in March 2026. Lawyer and LGBTQ rights activist Paulo Iotti noted that, although the court's decision is subject to appeal, it is unlikely to be overturned.

== Summary table ==
Same-sex sexual activity legal	Yes (Since 1830)
Equal age of consent	Yes (Since 1830)
Anti-discrimination laws in employment only	Yes (Since 2015 for sexual orientation; since 2019 for gender identity)
Anti-discrimination laws in the provision of goods and services	Yes (Since 2015 for sexual orientation; since 2019 for gender identity)
Anti-discrimination laws in all other areas (Incl. indirect discrimination, hate speech)	Yes (Since 2015 for sexual orientation; since 2019 for gender identity)
LGBTQ subjects free from censorship in education	Yes / No (Banned in Nova Iguaçu since 2016)
Same-sex marriages	Yes (Since 2013)
Recognition of same-sex couples	Yes (Since 2011)
Stepchild adoption by same-sex couples	Yes (Since 2010)
Joint adoption by same-sex couples	Yes (Since 2010; starting in 2007)
LGBTQ people allowed to serve openly in the military	Yes
Right to change legal gender	Yes (Since 2008; gender self-identification since 2018)
Third gender option	Yes (Since 2022, by court order)
Conversion therapy by medical professionals banned	Yes (Since 1999 for homosexuals and since 2018 for transgender people)
Access to IVF for lesbians	Yes (Since 2013)
Commercial surrogacy for gay male couples	No (Banned for any couple regardless of sexual orientation)
MSMs allowed to donate blood	Yes (Since 2020)
