= LGBTQ rights in Maranhão =

- Legal status: Legal since 1830, age of consent equalised
- Gender identity: Gender change allowed, official standard for altering legal sex doesn't require surgery since 2018
- Military: Allowed to serve openly
- Discrimination protections: Yes, since 2019

Family rights
- Recognition of relationships: Same-sex marriage since 2013
- Adoption: Legal since 2010

Lesbian, gay, bisexual, transgender and queer (LGBTQ) people in the Brazilian state of Maranhão enjoy many of the same legal protections available to non-LGBTQ people. In 2023, the governor of Maranhão, Carlos Brandão (PSB) vetoed 3 anti-LGBTQ bills, but one of his vetoes was overridden by the state Legislative Assembly. According to data from 2015 to 2025 from the Nexus agency, Maranhão has approved both bills in favor of and against transgender rights.

== Legality ==
In 1830, Brazilian Emperor Pedro I sanctioned the Imperial Penal Code, removing all references to sodomy from Brazilian law.

Same-sex marriage has been legal in Maranhão since 2013 via a decision by the National Council of Justice, in compliance with a previous decision of the Supreme Federal Court in 2011.

== Discrimination protections ==
On 31 June 2006, the governor of Maranhão, José Reinaldo, signed Law No. 8444, which prohibits discrimination based on sexual orientation.

On 13 June 2019, the Supreme Federal Court ruled that discrimination on the basis of gender identity is a crime akin to racism.

On 28 September 2022, Governor Carlos Brandão signed Law No. 11,827, which establishes the mandatory installation of signs regarding discrimination based on sexual orientation and gender in establishments in the state. The law was criticized on social media, with claims that it would mandate the installation of unisex bathrooms, but the governor denied this. On December 21, the Legislative Assembly approved a bill to repeal the law, which sparked protests from LGBTQ rights organizations, who urged the governor to veto the bill. In January 2023, the governor vetoed the bill.

== Gender identity and expression ==
In March 2018, the Brazilian Supreme Federal Court unanimously ruled that transgender people may change their legal gender without undergoing surgery or hormonal therapy, which were previously requirements. A transgender individual seeking to change their gender to reflect their gender identity can now simply apply to do so at a registry post in the country, without the need of a judicial document or any medical report.

On 21 December 2022, the Legislative Assembly of Maranhão approved a bill to prohibit the installation of unisex restrooms in the state. Governor Carlos Brandão vetoed the bill in 2023.

On 15 April 2025, the São Luís City Council approved a bill to ban transgender women from using women's restrooms and changing rooms. The Human Rights Center of the Public Defender's Office of Maranhão expressed opposition to the bill. The law was passed by the City Council on 13 May 2026, after the mayor neither approved nor vetoed it. On 3 June 2026, the Court of Justice of Maranhão struck down the law, following a lawsuit filed by the state's Public Defender's Office.

=== Third gender option ===
On 31 October 2024, following a lawsuit filed by the state's Public Defender's Office, the first document rectification for a non-binary person in the state took place in the city of Imperatriz. Other lawsuits were filed by the Public Defender's Office in 2025.

On 16 June 2026, the Court of Justice of Maranhão ordered the state government to recognize non-binary people. The court cited decisions by the Supreme Federal Court and the Superior Court of Justice regarding transgender people.

== Education ==
In January 2023, Governor Carlos Brandão vetoed a bill that would have prohibited gender-neutral language in schools. The Legislative Assembly overrode the veto in October 2023.

== Summary table ==
Same-sex sexual activity legal	Yes (Since 1830)
Equal age of consent	Yes (Since 1830)
Anti-discrimination laws in employment only	Yes (Since 2006 for sexual orientation; Since 2019 for gender identity)
Anti-discrimination laws in the provision of goods and services	Yes (Since 2006 for sexual orientation; Since 2019 for gender identity)
Anti-discrimination laws in all other areas (Incl. indirect discrimination, hate speech)	Yes (Since 2006 for sexual orientation; Since 2019 for gender identity)
LGBTQ subjects free from censorship in education	Yes / No (Gender-neutral language banned since 2023)
Same-sex marriages	Yes (Since 2013)
Recognition of same-sex couples	Yes (Since 2011)
Stepchild adoption by same-sex couples	Yes (Officially permitted since 2010)
Joint adoption by same-sex couples	Yes (Officially permitted since 2010)
LGBTQ people allowed to serve openly in the military	Yes
Right to change legal gender	Yes (Since 2008; gender self-identification since 2018)
Third gender option	Yes (Starting in 2024; Statewide since 2026)
Conversion therapy by medical professionals banned	Yes (Since 1999 for homosexuals and since 2018 for transgender people)
Access to IVF for lesbians	Yes (Since 2013)
Commercial surrogacy for gay male couples	No (Banned for any couple regardless of sexual orientation)
MSMs allowed to donate blood	Yes (Since 2020)
