= LGBTQ rights in Santa Catarina =

- Legal status: Legal since 1830, age of consent equalised
- Gender identity: Gender change allowed, official standard for altering legal sex doesn't require surgery since 2018
- Military: Allowed to serve openly

Family rights
- Recognition of relationships: Same-sex marriage since 2013

Lesbian, gay, bisexual, transgender and queer (LGBTQ) people in the Brazilian state of Santa Catarina enjoy many of the same legal protections available to non-LGBTQ people. Same-sex marriage has been legally performed in the state since April 2013, before national legalization by the Supreme Federal Court. Despite this, according to research by Agência Diadorim, as of 2025, 19 anti-LGBTQ bills had been introduced in the state's Legislative Assembly, with 11 of them being authored by the Liberal Party (PL). Santa Catarina is also considered one of the most conservative states in Brazil.

== Legality ==
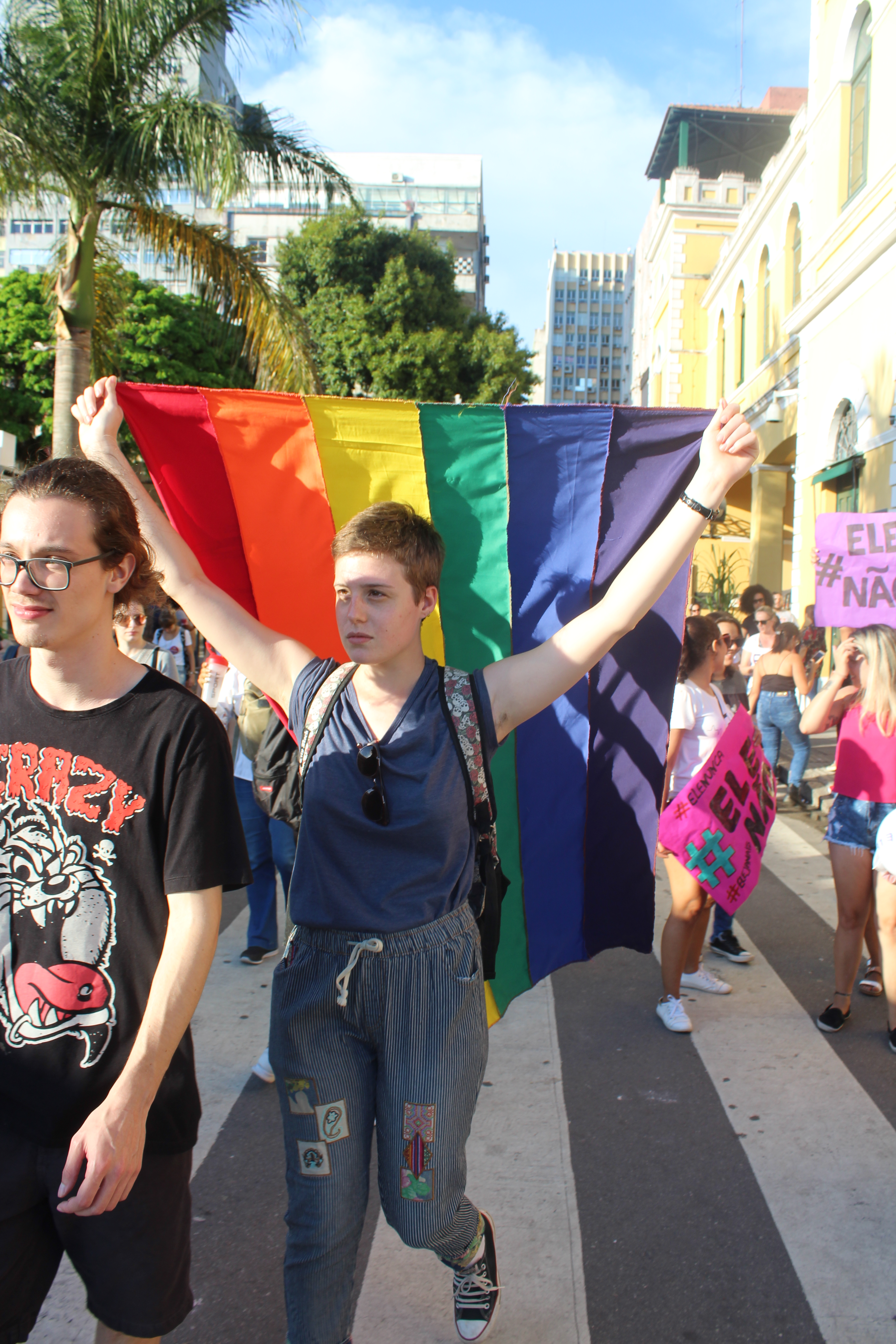
Pride flag at a protest in Florianópolis.

Same-sex sexual activity has been legal in Brazil since 1830.

In May 2011, the Supreme Federal Court (STF) recognized same-sex unions as family units throughout Brazil, ensuring the same rights and responsibilities as those of heterosexual couples. On 29 April 2013, the General Inspectorate of Justice of Santa Catarina published a resolution allowing same-sex marriage statewide.

== Hate crimes and discrimination law ==
On 4 April 2003, the Legislative Assembly of Santa Catarina enacted State Law No. 12,534, which prohibits discrimination based on sexual orientation and gender identity in the state. On 8 October 2015, the law was repealed by Complementary Law No. 656.

On 28 December 2010, the state governor, Leonel Pavan, signed Complementary Law No. 527, prohibiting discrimination based on sexual orientation and gender identity. In 2015, the state governor Raimundo Colombo filed a lawsuit against the law in the Supreme Federal Court, arguing that only the federal government can legislate on labor law. On 11 October 2018, the Supreme Federal Court partially overturned the law.

In 2019, discrimination based on sexual orientation and gender identity was banned through a decision by the Supreme Federal Court.

== Gender identity and expression ==
The Supreme Federal Court of Brazil (STF) ruled on 1 March 2018, that a transgender person has the right to change their official name and sex without the need of surgery or professional evaluation, just by self-declaration of their psychosocial identity.

A 2026 report showed that there were 271 unconstitutional laws processed in the legislative houses of Santa Catarina against women's rights or LGBTQ rights since 2015. About 70% involve the trans and travesti community. The data were gathered by the office of the councilor of Florianópolis Leonel Camasão (PSOL), it reported proposals from the Legislative Assembly of the State of Santa Catarina (Alesc) and municipal councils. 41% of the topics were ruled as unconstitutional by STF.

In 2021, Idris Kawabe became the second non-binary person in Brazil and the first in the state to judicially change their documents to reflect a neutral gender. Judicial actions are still required, without a state law recognizing it, with debates often pointing to the legislative vacuum. Legal sex is still required in birth certificates.

In December 2023, the Constitution and Justice Committee (CCJ) of the Legislative Assembly of Santa Catarina approved a bill prohibiting transgender women from participating in women's sports. The bill is still being reviewed by the assembly, as of 18 August 2026.

The Army announced that the situation of non-binary individuals would be treated in the same manner as that of intersex individuals, so that any Brazilian in the draft cohort who expresses a gender identity other than male and holds a final, unappealable court ruling or a civil registry amendment will be considered exempt from mandatory military service, as they do not meet the requirements set forth in the Federal Constitution, the Military Service Law, its implementing regulations, and the 2024 General Conscription Plan.

=== Access to restrooms ===
On 21 January 2026, Governor of Santa Catarina Jorginho Mello (Liberal Party) signed State Law No. 19,686/2026. All educational institutions (preschool, elementary, middle, high school, vocational, and higher education), whether public or private, are required to maintain strictly separate restrooms and changing rooms for males and females.

The Federal University of Santa Catarina installed signs in restrooms indicating that they may be used by people in accordance with their gender identity, with the first sign being installed on 18 June 2026.

In 2014, a trans woman sued a shopping mall in Florianópolis after being denied access to the women's restroom. A lower court ordered the mall to pay 15,000 reais in compensation for pain and suffering, but the decision was overturned by the Court of Justice of Santa Catarina. The woman appealed to the Supreme Federal Court in 2015, but the proceedings were halted by Justice Luiz Fux's request for more time to review the case. On 6 June 2024, the Supreme Court voted 8–3 to reject the woman's appeal, ruling that the case did not involve a constitutional issue.

On 7 July, lawyer Paulo Iotti published an article in CartaCapital criticizing the Supreme Court's decision. On the same day, Representative Paulo Bilynskyj posted on X claiming that the Supreme Court had banned transgender people from using restrooms corresponding to their gender identity—a claim debunked by the fact-checking agency Aos Fatos.

In August 2025, Paulo Iotti, together with the Associação Nacional de Travestis e Transexuais, the Associação Brasileira de Lésbicas, Gays, Bissexuais, Travestis, Transexuais e Intersexos, and other LGBTQ rights organizations, filed an extraordinary appeal against the Supreme Court and the Court of Justice of Santa Catarina with the Inter-American Court of Human Rights.

=== University policies ===
On 8 August 2023, the University Council of the Federal University of Santa Catarina approved the creation of affirmative action policies for trans people, allocating 1% of positions in public competitive examinations to trans individuals, travestis, non-binary people, and transmasculine individuals. In March 2025, the association Matria – Mulheres Associadas, Mães e Trabalhadoras do Brasil (lit. 'Associated Women, Mothers, and Workers of Brazil') filed a lawsuit against the university, arguing that the policies were not based on sufficient data. On 15 April 2025, Judge Alcides Vettorazzi, of the 2nd Federal Court of Florianópolis, upheld the quotas.

On 1 July 2026, the university approved a Gender Equity Policy, prohibiting discrimination based on gender identity and reserving up to 8% of available spots for women who have been victims of domestic violence, including trans women and travestis. In September 2026, Congresswoman Julia Zanatta, of the Liberal Party, introduced a legislative decree proposal to halt the university's policy, arguing that the university lacked the authority to establish such a resolution and that doing so would require a law passed by the National Congress.

== Education ==
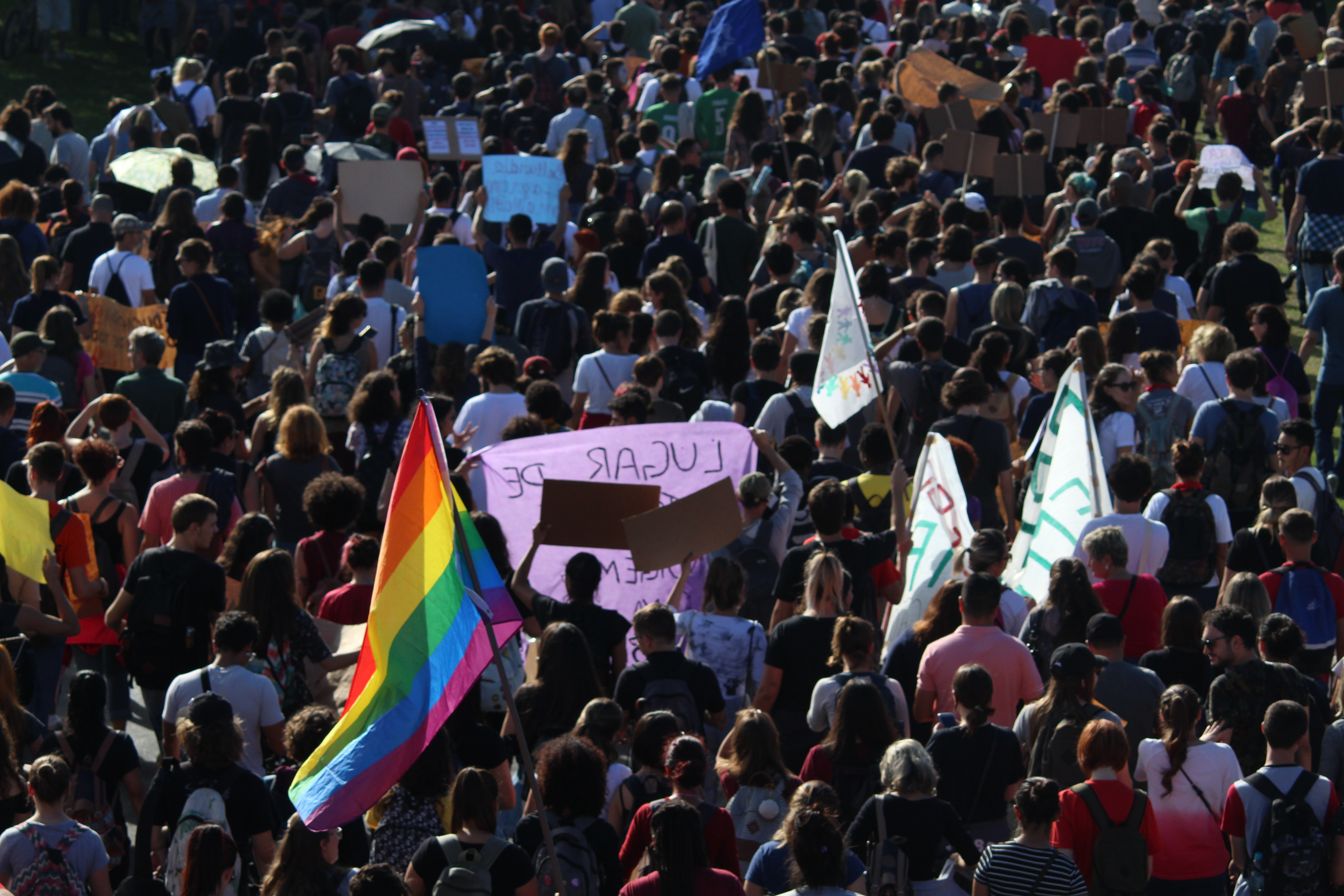
LGBTQ flag at 2019 National Education Day (May 15)

In 2015, the mayor of Blumenau, Napoleão Bernardes, signed into law an education plan for the city that prohibited the teaching of "gender identity," "gender ideology," and "gender orientation" in schools. In June 2017, the Office of the Attorney General of the Union submitted an opinion to the Supreme Court opposing the law, deeming it unconstitutional. In December 2019, Justice Edson Fachin issued an injunction suspending the law, following a legal challenge by the Federal Prosecution Office. On 28 June 2024, the Supreme Court voted unanimously to strike down the law.

During 2020 International Non-Binary People's Day, a coordinatory group at Federal University of Santa Catarina streamed a live named Non-Binariety: languages, gender technologies and (in)visibility among LGBTQIA+ movements. This generated backlash with Legislative Assembly of Santa Catarina, which moved a repudiation and an applause in the same day.

On 15 June 2021, Governor Carlos Moisés (Social Liberal Party) signed a decree banning the use of gender-neutral language in state schools. According to O Globo newspaper, the Attorney General of the Union and the Ministry of Education expressed their support for the decree. In July of the same year, the Workers' Party (PT) filed a lawsuit in the Supreme Federal Court against the decree. On 6 May 2025, the Supreme Federal Court overturned the decree.

On 1 April 2026, Governor Jorginho Mello (Liberal Party) signed a law allowing parents to prohibit their children from participating in classes on LGBTQ topics. The law was published in the Official Gazette on the 6th. On 17 April, the Court of Justice of Santa Catarina voted unanimously to strike down the law.

On 20 December 2021, the mayor of Joinville, Adriano Silva (New Party), signed a law banning gender-neutral language in the city's public office. The bill had been proposed by Councilman Wilian Tonezi (Podemos party) and approved by the City Council in an 18–1 vote. On 3 August 2022, the law was struck down by the Court of Justice of Santa Catarina.

In May 2021, city councilor Carlos Souza Fernandes—known as "Kaká"—introduced a bill to ban gender-neutral language in schools in the city of Balneário Camboriú. On 12 December 2023, the bill was approved by the City Council by a vote of 14–2. In May 2024, LGBTQ rights organizations filed a lawsuit challenging the law. In December 2024, it was struck down by the Supreme Federal Court.

On 15 October 2025, the Supreme Federal Court struck down a 2015 law from Tubarão that prohibited the teaching of gender and sexual orientation in schools.

== Life conditions ==
=== Discrimination ===
In 2024, the Brazilian Public Security Yearbook reported 85 cases of intentional bodily injury against LGBTQ individuals. That same year, the Associação Nacional de Travestis e Transexuais recorded three murders of trans people. According to a report by Agência Diadorim, the low rates of violence against LGBTQ individuals in the state are the result of underreporting.

On 3 September 2026, the Court of Justice of Santa Catarina ordered the parents of a gay teenager in Jaguaruna to pay 100,000 reais in compensation after they had kicked him out of the house and exposed his sexual orientation on social media.

=== Politics ===
According to data from Agência Diadorim, 19 anti-LGBTQ and 4 pro-LGBTQ bills were introduced in the state Legislative Assembly. Of the 19 anti-LGBTQ bills, 11 were presented by representatives from the Liberal Party, with 8 of these authored by representatives Jessé Lopes and Ana Campagnolo. Ten of the bills concerned gender-neutral language or the transsexualization process.

On 8 August 2024, Governor Jorginho Mello stated in a post on X that the state would not sponsor the Florianópolis Pride Parade. He claimed that the decision was based on "technical criteria" and that only "strictly cultural" projects would be supported by the government.

Jorginho Mello
(@jorginhomello)
tweeted:

Portuguese:

O Governo de Santa Catarina reafirma seu compromisso com a cultura.

A decisão de não patrocinar a Parada LGBT de Florianópolis foi baseada em critérios técnicos. Somente projetos estritamente culturais receberão apoio.

Não financiaremos pautas ideológicas. #VamoQVamo

Translation:

The Government of Santa Catarina reaffirms its commitment to culture. The decision not to sponsor the Florianópolis LGBT Pride Parade was based on technical criteria. Only strictly cultural projects will receive support. We will not finance ideological agendas. #KeepOn

8 August 2024

== Summary table ==
Same-sex sexual activity legal	Yes (Since 1830)
Equal age of consent	Yes (Since 1830)
Anti-discrimination laws in employment only	Yes (Since 2010)
Anti-discrimination laws in the provision of goods and services	Yes (Since 2010)
Anti-discrimination laws in all other areas (Incl. indirect discrimination, hate speech)	Yes (Since 2010)
LGBTQ subjects free from censorship in education	Yes (Since 2026)
Gender-neutral bathrooms	Yes / No (Banned in schools since 2026)
Same-sex marriages	Yes (Since 2013)
Recognition of same-sex couples	Yes (Since 2011)
Stepchild adoption by same-sex couples	Yes (Officially permitted since 2010)
Joint adoption by same-sex couples	Yes (Officially permitted since 2010)
LGBTQ people allowed to serve openly in the military	Yes
Right to change legal gender	Yes (Since 2008; gender self-identification since 2018)
Third gender option	Yes / No (Allowed in some cases, without specific legislation)
Conversion therapy by medical professionals banned	Yes (Since 1999 for homosexuals and since 2018 for transgender people)
Access to IVF for lesbians	Yes (Since 2013)
Commercial surrogacy for gay male couples	No (Banned for any couple regardless of sexual orientation)
MSMs allowed to donate blood	Yes (Since 2020)
