= LGBTQ rights in Mato Grosso =

- Legal status: Legal since 1830, age of consent equalised
- Gender identity: Gender change allowed, official standard for altering legal sex doesn't require surgery since 2018
- Military: Allowed to serve openly
- Discrimination protections: Yes, since 1989 for sexual orientation; since 2019 for gender identity

Family rights
- Recognition of relationships: Same-sex marriage since 2013
- Adoption: Legal since 2010

Lesbian, gay, bisexual, transgender and queer (LGBTQ) people in the Brazilian state of Mato Grosso enjoy many of the same legal protections available to non-LGBTQ people. Homosexuality is legal in the state.

== Legality of same-sex sexual activity ==
Same-sex sexual activity has been legal in Brazil since 1830.

== Recognition of same-sex unions ==
Same-sex marriage has been legal in Mato Grosso since 2013 via a decision by the National Council of Justice, in compliance with a previous decision of the Supreme Federal Court in 2011.

== Adoption and parenting ==
Since 2015, same-sex adoption has been officially permitted in the state through a decision by the Supreme Federal Court.

== Hate crimes and discrimination law ==
The 1989 Constitution of Mato Grosso prohibits discrimination based on sexual orientation. Article 10, item III establishes that the state must guarantee:

The implementation of measures to ensure that no one will be harmed or privileged on account of birth, race, color, sex, marital status, nature of their work, age, religion, sexual orientation, political or philosophical beliefs, physical or mental disability, and any other particularity or condition. (Note: In Brazilian Portuguese: a implantação de meios assecuratórios de que ninguém será prejudicado ou privilegiado em razão de nascimento, raça, cor, sexo, estado civil, natureza de seu trabalho, idade, religião, orientação sexual, convicções políticas ou filosóficas, deficiência física ou mental e qualquer particularidade ou condição)

In 2019, discrimination based on gender identity was banned through a decision by the Supreme Federal Court.

== Gender identity and expression ==
The Supreme Federal Court of Brazil ruled on 1 March 2018, that a transgender person has the right to change their official name and sex without the need of surgery or professional evaluation, just by self-declaration of their psychosocial identity.

On 4 February 2025, Cuiabá Councilman Beal Ranalli, of the Liberal Party, introduced a bill to establish biological sex as the sole criterion for athlete participation in competitions in the city. In an interview with TV Centro América, Ranalli stated that trans women should compete in men's sports.

On 19 August 2025, the Cuiabá City Council passed a bill banning trans athletes from competing in women's sports in the city. The law was signed by Mayor Abilio Brunini, of the Liberal Party, and published in the Official Gazette on 15 September 2025. The Mato Grosso LGBTQIA+ Pride Parade Association and the state Public Defender's Office filed a lawsuit seeking to overturn the law and obtain 600,000 reais in damages for moral harm, but the case was dismissed by the Court for Collective Actions on 30 October 2025. According to the news site G1, the Mato Grosso LGBTQIA+ Pride Parade Association stated that it would appeal the decision to the Court of Justice of Mato Grosso. On 11 June 2026, the Court of Justice unanimously struck down the law, stating that the city lacked the authority to enact legislation on the subject.

On 1 November 2025, a trans woman was expelled from a pizzeria in Feliz Natal after using the women's restroom. The pizzeria owner was taken to the police station for gender identity discrimination but was released on November 2 following a custody hearing. As of 16 September 2026, the case is under investigation by the Civil Police.

== Censorship ==
=== SUS Conference case ===
On 30 July 2025, Professor Maria Inês da Silva, from the Federal University of Mato Grosso, left the Municipal Conference of the Unified Health System in Cuiabá after being interrupted by the city's mayor, Abilio Brunini, for using gender-neutral language. Health organizations, women's rights groups, and Black rights organizations condemned the mayor's action.

=== Education ===
On 20 August 2018, the Água Boa City Council approved a bill to institute the Escola sem Partido program in the city's schools. The city's mayor, Mauro Rosa da Silva, signed the bill into law on September 21.

On 9 March 2022, the mayor of Sinop, Roberto Dorner, of the Republicans party, signed a law prohibiting the distribution of educational materials containing "gender ideology." The law went into effect on March 14. On November 10, the law was struck down by the Court of Justice of Mato Grosso. Appellate Judge Maria Aparecida Ribeiro stated that the law violated both the Federal and State Constitutions.

In 2023, the city of Rondonópolis enacted a law to ban gender-neutral language in schools. In June 2024, Supreme Court Justice Flávio Dino struck down the law via an injunction. On 6 August 2024, the full Supreme Court upheld Dino's decision.

On 14 April 2026, the Governor of Mato Grosso, Otaviano Pivetta, of the Republicans party, signed into law a ban on the teaching of "gender ideology" in the state's public schools. In August 2026, the law was struck down by the Court of Justice following a lawsuit filed by the Workers' Party.

=== Pride events ===
On 4 February 2025, Councilman Beal Ranalli introduced a bill to ban the participation of minors in Cuiabá's Pride events.
