= LGBTQ rights in Minas Gerais =

- Legal status: Legal since 1830, age of consent equalised
- Gender identity: Gender change allowed, official standard for altering legal sex doesn't require surgery since 2018
- Military: Allowed to serve openly
- Discrimination protections: Yes, since 2002 for sexual orientation; since 2019 for gender identity

Family rights
- Recognition of relationships: Same-sex marriage since 2013
- Adoption: Legal since 2015

Lesbian, gay, bisexual, transgender and queer (LGBTQ) rights in the Brazilian state of Minas Gerais have had significant legal advances in recent decades. Homosexuality has been legal in the state, as well as throughout Brazil, since 1830.

== Legality ==
In 1830, Brazilian Emperor Dom Pedro I sanctioned the Imperial Penal Code, removing all references to sodomy from Brazilian law.

Same-sex marriage has been legal in of Minas Gerais since 2013 via a decision by the National Council of Justice, in compliance with a previous decision of the Supreme Federal Court in 2011.

=== Adoption and parenting ===
On 24 May 2011, the Court of Justice of Minas Gerais authorized the adoption of a three-year-old child by a lesbian couple, that are residing in the city of Patos de Minas. The biological mother, that is heterosexual, gave evidence in the Court of Justice, demonstrating a desire to give her child up for adoption by the lesbian couple.

Since 2015, same-sex adoption has been legal nationwide through a decision by the Supreme Federal Court.

== Hate crimes and discrimination law ==
On 15 January 2002, the Governor of Minas Gerais, Itamar Franco, signed Law No. 14,170, prohibiting discrimination based on sexual orientation in the state.

On 3 January 2007, State Governor Aécio Neves signed Law No. 16,636, establishing May 17 as the State Day Against Homophobia.

On 15 December 2017, State Governor Fernando Pimentel issued Decree No. 47,306, creating the Social Name Card (Brazilian Portuguese: Carteira de Nome Social), authorizing trans and travesti individuals to use their social names for identification purposes.

In 2019, the Supreme Federal Court ruled that discrimination based on sexual orientation and gender identity is illegal nationwide.

=== Municipal ordinances ===
On 12 May 2000, the mayor of Juiz de Fora, Tarcísio Delgado, signed Law No. 9791, prohibiting discrimination based on sexual orientation and gender identity in the city.

On 11 September 2001, the mayor of Alfenas, José Wurtemberg, signed Law No. 3,277, prohibiting discrimination based on sexual orientation and gender identity in the city. The law, also known as the "Pink Law" (Brazilian Portuguese: Lei Rosa), was proposed by the LGBTQ rights organization Movimento Gay de Alfenas (MGA).

On 12 December 2007, the mayor of São João del-Rei, Sidney Antônio, signed Law No. 4,172, prohibiting discrimination based on sexual orientation and gender identity in the city.

On 18 May 2009, the mayor of Alfenas, Pompilio de Lourdes Carnavez, signed Law No. 4,120, establishing 17 May as the Municipal Day of Struggle against Homophobia.

On 29 January 2001, Law No. 8176 was enacted in Belo Horizonte, prohibiting discrimination based on sexual orientation in the city. In 2021, Councilwoman Duda Salabert (PDT) introduced a bill to include discrimination based on gender identity in the law.

On 10 January 2002, the mayor of Contagem, Ademir Lucas Gomes, signed Law No. 3506, prohibiting discrimination based on sexual orientation in the city.

On 11 December 2003, Belo Horizonte Mayor Fernando Pimentel signed Law No. 8719, prohibiting discrimination based on sexual orientation in the city.

== Gender identity and expression ==
The Supreme Federal Court of Brazil ruled on 1 March 2018, that a transgender person has the right to change their official name and sex without the need of surgery or professional evaluation, just by self-declaration of their psychosocial identity.

Since 2023, during Pride Month, the Public Defender's Office of the State of Minas Gerais began holding free initiatives to assist non-binary individuals in the state with name and gender marker changes. On 29 May 2025, Tai Barreto became one of the first non-binary people to change their name and gender on their documents in the state, through a lawsuit filed by the Public Defender's Office with the Court of Justice of Minas Gerais. Despite lawsuits filed by the Public Defender's Office, non-binary individuals still face challenges changing their documents in the state.

=== Bathroom access ===
On 12 September 2022, the Uberaba City Council approved a bill banning unisex restrooms by a vote of 11–6. On 7 October, the law was enacted—after Mayor Elisa Araújo (Solidariedade) neither vetoed nor signed it—and published in the Official Gazette. The Public Defender's Office of Minas Gerais filed a lawsuit against the law in 2023, and it was struck down by the state's Court of Justice in 2024.

On 4 October 2023, the Belo Horizonte City Council approved—by a vote of 26 in favor, 13 against, and one abstention—a bill authorizing religious institutions to prohibit transgender people from using restrooms that correspond to their gender identity. Mayor Fuad Noman (PSD) signed the bill into law on 20 November 2023. The law was struck down by a preliminary injunction from the Court of Justice in August 2025.

In August 2026, the Court of Justice ordered a shopping mall in Contagem to pay 2,000 reais in compensation to a trans woman after denying her access to the women's restroom. The incident occurred in 2019, when the woman was approached by a security guard after using the women's restroom. According to reports, the guard told the woman to "use common sense" and "think about mothers with children," and asked for a document proving her "sex change." At the time, the mall issued an apology but denied the allegations of discrimination. A court in Contagem had initially rejected the claim for compensation, ruling that there was insufficient evidence of discrimination. The woman appealed to the Court of Justice, which ruled in her favor.

== Education ==
In 2015, the city of Ipatinga enacted a law establishing the Escola sem Partido program, banning instruction on gender diversity and sexual orientation in schools. On 18 October 2019, the law was blocked by a preliminary injunction issued by Justice Gilmar Mendes. On 28 May 2020, the Supreme Federal Court struck down the law.

On 16 September 2021, the Divinópolis City Council approved a bill to ban gender-neutral language in schools. The bill was signed into law on 23 September by the city's mayor, Gleidson Azevedo (PSC). On November 18, Azevedo defended the law, stating that he "would rather die than defend gender ideology."

On 18 January 2022, the mayor of Betim, Vittorio Medioli, signed a law banning the use of gender-neutral language in schools. On 11 May 2026, the Supreme Federal Court struck down the law by a 7–3 vote.

On 2 December 2022, Uberlândia Mayor Odelmo Leão signed a bill into law banning gender-neutral language in schools. The bill had been proposed by Councilman Cristiano Caporezzo. On 3 February 2025, the Supreme Federal Court struck down the law.

In 2022, the city of Ibirité enacted a law banning gender-neutral language in schools. The law was blocked by a preliminary injunction issued by Justice Alexandre de Moraes on 17 May 2024. On 24 February 2026, the Supreme Federal Court voted to strike down the law.

== Restrictions on pride parades ==
On 11 July 2023, the Betim City Council passed a bill banning minors from attending pride parades in the city. The Public Defender's Office and the Public Prosecutor's Office recommended that the city mayor veto the bill. On 27 July, the mayor vetoed the bill. In August, the City Council overrode the veto, resulting in the bill being signed into law and published in the Official Gazette on October 9.

On 10 November, the Public Defender's Office filed a lawsuit against the law.

== Life conditions ==
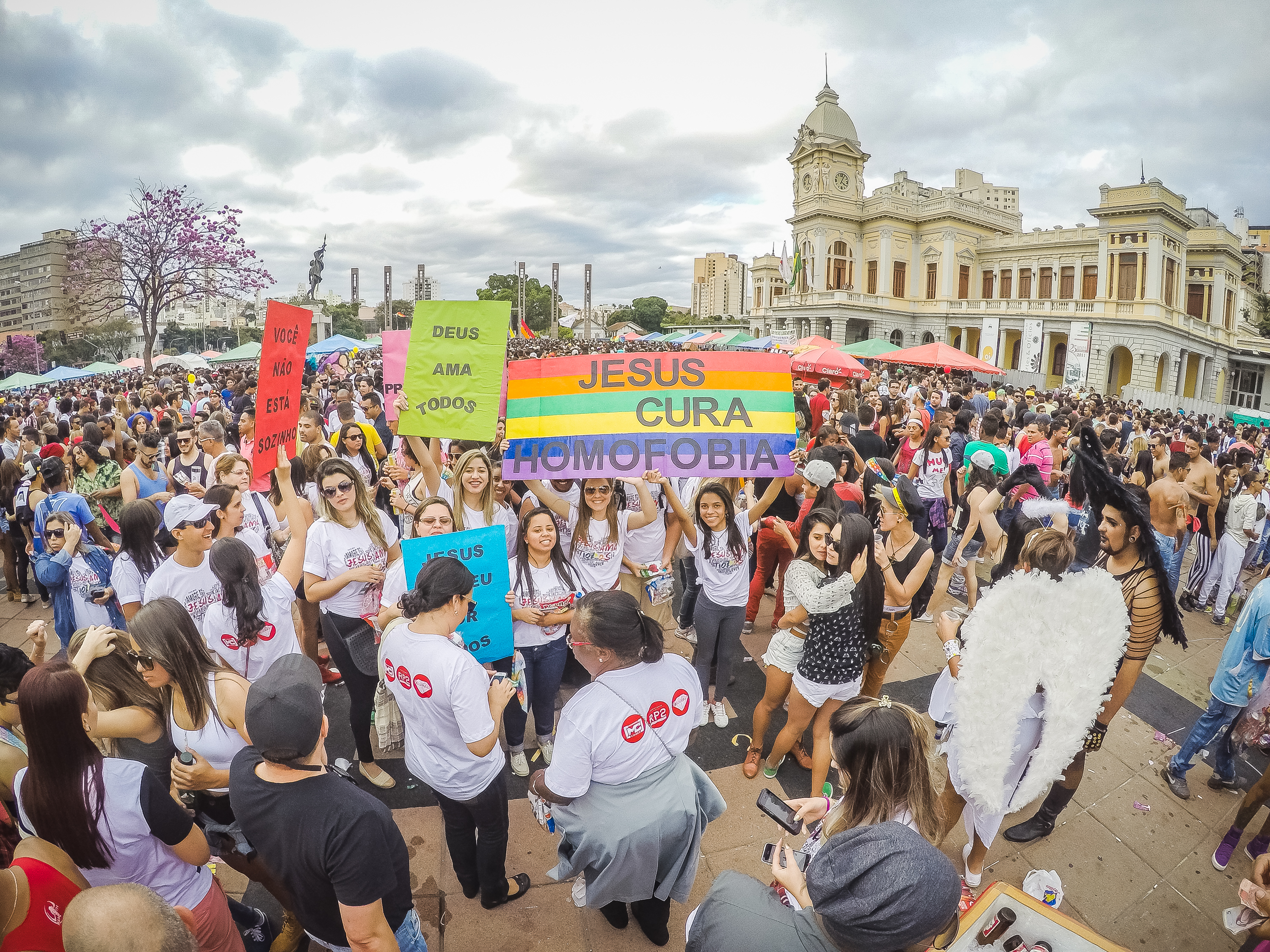
18th edition of the Belo Horizonte Pride Parade, on 19 July 2015.

In Minas Gerais, the main Pride events take place in the cities of Belo Horizonte, Contagem, Divinópolis, Juiz de Fora, Montes Claros, Ouro Preto, Pouso Alegre, Teófilo Otoni, Uberlândia, and Vespasiano.

The 26th edition of the Belo Horizonte Pride Parade in 2025 generated 42.7 million reais in revenue for the city's economy, according to data from Grupo Diverso and the Federal University of Minas Gerais. The first edition of the parade—known at the time as the Gay Pride Parade—took place in 1997 and was founded by the Associação Lésbica de Minas (lit. 'Lesbian Association of Minas Gerais'; Além). On 17 August 2025, a judge from the Court of Justice of Minas Gerais issued a preliminary injunction limiting the city government's funding for the parade from 450,000 reais to 100,000 reais, following a lawsuit filed by city councilors Uner Augusto (PL) and Phablo Almeida (PL). The decision was reversed by another judge of the Court of Justice on 22 July.

The LGBTQ organization Movimento Gay de Alfenas (MGA) was founded in 2000 in the city of Alfenas and officially registered in 2003. The organization advocated for the rights of people living with HIV, even establishing a gym specifically for them that operated from 2008 to 2009. The organization was honored by the Legislative Assembly of Minas Gerais on 25 May 2026, following a request by Representative Ana Paula Siqueira (PT). The organization celebrated its 25th anniversary in 2025 at the Alfenas Pride Parade, an event the organization has held since 2004.

=== Violence against LGBTQ people ===
Despite anti-discrimination measures, violence against LGBTQ people is frequent in the state. According to data from the Grupo Gay da Bahia, Minas Gerais ranked as the Brazilian state with the second-highest number of cases of violence against LGBTQ people in 2017.

According to a study by the Federal University of Minas Gerais in partnership with the state Public Prosecutor's Office, released on 1 July 2024, 60% of deaths involving trans people and travestis in the state resulted from violence. The data also indicated that 74% of the victims were identified as Black or Pardo.

In 2025, according to data from the Associação Nacional de Travestis e Transexuais, Minas Gerais ranked—alongside Ceará—as the Brazilian state with the highest number of murders of trans people and travestis.

On 15 July 2026, the Court of Justice of Minas Gerais, in partnership with the National Council of Justice, held an event in Belo Horizonte regarding violence against women and LGBTQ individuals. The event featured the launch of an incident reporting mechanism for cases of violence against LGBTQ people.

== Summary table ==
Same-sex sexual activity legal	Yes (Since 1830)
Equal age of consent	Yes (Since 1830)
Anti-discrimination laws in employment only	Yes (Since 2002 for sexual orientation; Since 2019 for gender identity)
Anti-discrimination laws in the provision of goods and services	Yes (Since 2002 for sexual orientation; Since 2019 for gender identity)
Anti-discrimination laws in all other areas (Incl. indirect discrimination, hate speech)	Yes (Since 2002 for sexual orientation; Since 2019 for gender identity)
LGBTQ subjects free from censorship in education	Yes / No (Gender-neutral language banned in Divinópolis since 2021)
Same-sex marriages	Yes (Since 2013)
Recognition of same-sex couples	Yes (Since 2011)
Stepchild adoption by same-sex couples	Yes (Allowed nationwide since 2015)
Joint adoption by same-sex couples	Yes (Allowed nationwide since 2015; allowed in one case in 2011)
LGBTQ people allowed to serve openly in the military	Yes
Right to change legal gender	Yes (Since 2008; gender self-identification since 2018)
Third gender option	Yes / No (No state law; since 2023, through court decisions)
Conversion therapy by medical professionals banned	Yes (Since 1999 for homosexuals and since 2018 for transgender people)
Access to IVF for lesbians	Yes (Since 2013)
Commercial surrogacy for gay male couples	No (Banned for any couple regardless of sexual orientation)
MSMs allowed to donate blood	Yes (Since 2020)
