= LGBTQ rights in Alagoas =

- Legal status: Legal since 1830, age of consent equalised
- Gender identity: Gender change allowed, official standard for altering legal sex doesn't require surgery since 2018
- Military: Allowed to serve openly
- Discrimination protections: Yes, since 2019

Family rights
- Recognition of relationships: Same-sex marriage since 2011
- Adoption: Legal since 2010

Lesbian, gay, bisexual, transgender and queer (LGBTQ) people in the Brazilian state of Alagoas enjoy many of the same legal protections available to non-LGBTQ people. It was the first Brazilian state to recognize same-sex marriages without requiring judicial approval.

== Recognition of same-sex unions ==
On December 7, 2011, the Court of Alagoas legalized same-sex marriage throughout the state of Alagoas, being the first Brazilian state to do so. Same-sex couples don't need to have judge's approval to have a marriage license.

== Gender identity and expression ==
In March 2018, the Brazilian Supreme Federal Court unanimously ruled that transgender people may change their legal gender without undergoing surgery or hormonal therapy, which were previously requirements. A transgender individual seeking to change their gender to reflect their gender identity can now simply apply to do so at a registry post in the country, without the need of a judicial document or any medical report.

On October 15, 2021, Fênix da Silva Leite became the first non-binary person to change their documents in the state, through a court decision.

== Discrimination protections ==
In March 22, 2001, the Legislative Assembly of Alagoas enacted Constitutional Amendment No. 23, prohibiting discrimination based on sexual orientation.

Since 2019, discrimination based on gender identity has been prohibited nationwide in Brazil, through a decision by the Supreme Federal Court.

== Censorship ==
On May 5, 2016, Alagoas enacted a law establishing the Escola Livre program (lit. 'Free School'), which prohibits "ideological and political indoctrination" in the state's schools. On March 21, 2017, Supreme Court Justice Luís Roberto Barroso suspended the law through a preliminary injunction.

On March 3, 2026, the Legislative Assembly of Alagoas enacted a law prohibiting the participation of children and adolescents in pride parades in the state. The law was challenged in the Supreme Federal Court by LGBTQ rights organizations.

== Summary table ==
Same-sex sexual activity legal	Yes (Since 1830)
Equal age of consent	Yes (Since 1830)
Anti-discrimination laws in employment only	Yes (Since 2001 for sexual orientation; since 2019 for gender identity)
Anti-discrimination laws in the provision of goods and services	Yes (Since 2001 for sexual orientation; since 2019 for gender identity)
Anti-discrimination laws in all other areas (Incl. indirect discrimination, hate speech)	Yes (Since 2001 for sexual orientation; since 2019 for gender identity)
LGBTQ subjects free from censorship in education	Yes (Since 2017; ban revoked)
Freedom of expression	Yes / No (Restricted at pride parades since 2026)
Same-sex marriages	Yes (Since 2011)
Recognition of same-sex couples	Yes (Since 2011)
Stepchild adoption by same-sex couples	Yes (Officially permitted since 2010)
Joint adoption by same-sex couples	Yes (Officially permitted since 2010)
LGBTQ people allowed to serve openly in the military	Yes
Right to change legal gender	Yes (Since 2008; gender self-identification since 2018)
Third gender option	Yes / No (Allowed in one case by court order)
Conversion therapy by medical professionals banned	Yes (Since 1999 for homosexuals and since 2018 for transgender people)
Access to IVF for lesbians	Yes (Since 2013)
Commercial surrogacy for gay male couples	No (Banned for any couple regardless of sexual orientation)
MSMs allowed to donate blood	Yes (Since 2020)
