= Processo transexualizador =

Gender affirming therapy by Unified Health System in Brazil

Processo transexualizador (English: Transsexualization process) is a set of procedures and forms of care provided to the LGBTQ community in Brazil. It includes a complex of multidisciplinary services and forms of care offered by the Unified Health System (SUS), directed toward the care of this population who wish to make changes to their physical bodies and sexual characteristics. These also include assistance to enable the use of a social name, and psychological support among others. It was established in August 2008, and later expanded in November 2013.

== Lack of access ==
The transgender population in Brazil often lives in extremely vulnerable situations across different social spheres, including barriers to healthcare access for this population. It is estimated that the life expectancy of the transsexual and transvestite population in Brazil is 35 years. This population has higher rates of depression, anxiety, suicide, and exposure to sexually transmitted infections (STIs), and human immunodeficiency virus (HIV). It is estimated that at least 42% of transgender people in Brazil have attempted suicide, making it increasingly a public health issue. When an easily accessible gender transition is not provided, procedures are carried out illegally and dangerously, putting lives at risk. These population frequently expose themselves to risks in order to carry out bodily transformations, for example, the injection of industrial silicone.

== Transsexualization ==
The processo transexualizador ("Transsexualization process" was evolved as a set of procedures and forms of care provided to the LGBTQ community. It includes a set of multidisciplinary services and forms of care offered by the Unified Health System (SUS), the public healthcare agency of Brazil. It is directed towards the care of the LGBTQ population who wish to make changes to their physical bodies and sexual characteristics, including hormone therapy, mastectomy, breast augmentation, and gender-affirming surgery among others. It also includes assistance for the use of social name, and psychological support.

The process was established after pressure through social movements over the years. It was instituted by ordinance No.1,707 and No. 457 of August 2008, and was subsequently expanded by ordinance No. 2,803 of November 2013.

The expansion and strengthening of the care network for this population helps reduce inequality in terms of access to healthcare and provides historical reparation to those who are systematically subjected to violence within current social structure. The SUS has ten accredited and locally functioning services, in addition to outpatient clinics specifically dedicated to this process. Currently, the minimum age for undergoing these surgeries is 18 years.

On 16 April 2026, the Federal Council of Medicine approved a resolution to ban gender-affirming hormone therapy for children and adolescents and sterilization surgeries for those under 21 years of age.

== Depathologization ==
Pathologization refers to the act of considering human conditions as a disease or anomaly, even when it is not. Depathologization refers to the process of listening to such conditions and their subsequent deconstruction to enable them to be declassified as diseases or anomalies.

Resolution No. 1 enacted in December 2018 by the Federal Council of Psychology, emerged as a pioneering milestone in the struggle for and defense of the depathologization of genders and sexualities, because it calls upon the people in the psychology profession and other forms of care to move towards a more ethical practice. The World Health Organization removed the category of transsexuality from that of a mental disorder, and defined it as a "condition related to sexual health", which indicated the earlier continued psychopatologization of the conditions related to transsexuals.

== See also ==
- Transgender rights in Brazil
