= LGBTQ rights in Pernambuco =

LGBTQ rights in a state of Brazil

- Legal status: Legal since 1830, age of consent equalised
- Gender identity: Gender change allowed, official standard for altering legal sex doesn't require surgery since 2018
- Military: Allowed to serve openly
- Discrimination protections: Yes, since 2019

Family rights
- Recognition of relationships: Same-sex marriage since 2013
- Adoption: Legal since 2010

Lesbian, gay, bisexual, transgender and queer (LGBTQ) people in the Brazilian state of Pernambuco enjoy many of the same legal protections available to non-LGBTQ people. Homosexuality is legal in the state.

== Legality ==
Same-sex sexual activity has been legal in Brazil since 1830.

Same-sex marriage has been legal in Pernambuco since 2013 via a decision by the National Council of Justice, in compliance with a previous decision of the Supreme Federal Court in 2011.

== Adoption and parenting ==
On 9 October 2008, a decision of judge Élio Braz of the 2nd Court of Childhood and Adolescence in Recife, permitted the adoption of two sisters by a male homosexual couple of Natal, Rio Grande do Norte to be entered in the register of adoption. The girls, who were in a shelter, were given new birth certificates on which they appear as children of two parents. The Public Prosecutor agreed with the court ruling and declined to take further action. The judge said the decision is unique due to the joint request of two persons of one sex with an entry in the register, in the same manner as a heterosexual couple.

Since 2010, same-sex adoption has been officially permitted in the state through a decision by the Supreme Federal Court.

On 2 March 2012, a court in Recife authorized the adoption of a baby by a gay couple, being the first gay couple to register a child with both fathers' names in the country.

== Discrimination protections ==
Since 2019, discrimination based on sexual orientation and gender identity has been prohibited nationwide in Brazil, through a decision by the Supreme Federal Court.

On 13 July 2024, the president of the Legislative Assembly of Pernambuco signed Law No. 18,634, which establishes the State Policy for Combating Violence against LGBTQIA+ People.

In June 2026, state representative João Paulo (PT) presented a bill to prohibit discrimination based on sexual orientation and gender identity in the Unified Health System.

== Gender identity and expression ==
The Supreme Federal Court of Brazil ruled on 1 March 2018, that a transgender person has the right to change their official name and sex without the need of surgery or professional evaluation, just by self-declaration of their psychosocial identity.

On 4 July 2018, the mayor of Petrolina, Miguel Coelho, signed a decree allowing trans people and travestis to use their social name on documents.

In 2023, following a lawsuit filed by the Public Defender's Office of Pernambuco in 2022, the Court of Justice of Pernambuco authorized Tarlazza Messina to change their documents to reflect their gender identity, making them the first non-binary person to do so in the state.

== Education ==
On 7 December 2017, the Petrolina City Council approved, by a vote of 12–2, a bill prohibiting discussions on "gender ideology" in schools. The bill was signed into law by Mayor Miguel Coelho on 19 December 2017. On 18 July 2018, Justice Marco Aurélio Mello ordered the city government to provide an explanation regarding the law. On 15 October 2025, the law was struck down by the Supreme Federal Court, alongside a similar law in Garanhuns.

On 13 December 2017, the mayor of Garanhuns, Izaías Régis, signed a law prohibiting "gender ideology" in the city's schools. On 15 October 2025, the Supreme Federal Court struck down the law, after lawsuits filed by the Prosecutor General of the Republic and the Socialism and Liberty Party.
