= LGBTQ rights in Ceará =

- Legal status: Legal since 1830, age of consent equalised
- Gender identity: Gender change allowed, official standard for altering legal sex doesn't require surgery since 2018
- Military: Allowed to serve openly
- Discrimination protections: Yes, since 2019

Family rights
- Recognition of relationships: Same-sex marriage since 2013
- Adoption: Legal since 2010

Lesbian, gay, bisexual, transgender and queer (LGBTQ) people in the Brazilian state of Ceará enjoy many of the same legal protections available to non-LGBTQ people. Same-sex marriage is legal in the state since 2013. Attempts to ban "gender ideology" have been proposed in cities across the state, such as Fortaleza, Sobral, Juazeiro do Norte, Crato, and Quixadá.

== Recognition of same-sex unions ==
On 7 March 2013, Ceará's state general attorney, Francisco Sales Neto, ruled in decision 02/2013 that all notaries statewide are obligated to accept same-sex marriages. The decision took effect on 15 March 2013.

== Discrimination protections ==
On 16 November 2006, the governor of Ceará, Lúcio Alcântara signed a law that mandates the inclusion of educational materials on sexual orientation in the training of the state's Civil and Military Police. The law was published in the Official Gazette on the 26th.

On 13 June 2019, the Supreme Federal Court ruled that discrimination on the basis of sexual orientation and gender identity is a crime akin to racism.

On 19 May 2021, governor of Ceará Camilo Santana (PT) signed Law No. 17,480, which establishes the mandatory installation of notices against discrimination based on sexual orientation and gender identity in establishments.

== Gender identity and expression ==
The Supreme Federal Court of Brazil ruled on 1 March 2018, that a transgender person has the right to change their official name and sex without the need of surgery or professional evaluation, just by self-declaration of their psychosocial identity.

On 22 May 2024, the Court of Justice of Ceará (TJCE) authorized Brune Bonassi to rectify their documents to reflect a neutral gender, making them the first non-binary person in the state to do so.

== Education ==
On 30 May 2016, Governor Camilo Santana signed Law No. 16.025 into effect, establishing the State Education Plan. Article XV prohibits "the use of gender ideology in state education."

On 12 December 2017, the Sobral City Council approved a bill to ban the teaching of gender issues in the city's schools. The bill was vetoed by Mayor Ivo Gomes, and the City Council voted to uphold the veto.
