= LGBTQ rights in Amapá =

- Location of Amapá in Brazil
- Legal status: Legal since 1830, age of consent equalised
- Gender identity: Gender change allowed, official standard for altering legal sex doesn't require surgery since 2018
- Military: Allowed to serve openly
- Discrimination protections: Since 2019

Family rights
- Recognition of relationships: Same-sex marriage since 2012
- Adoption: Legal since 2010

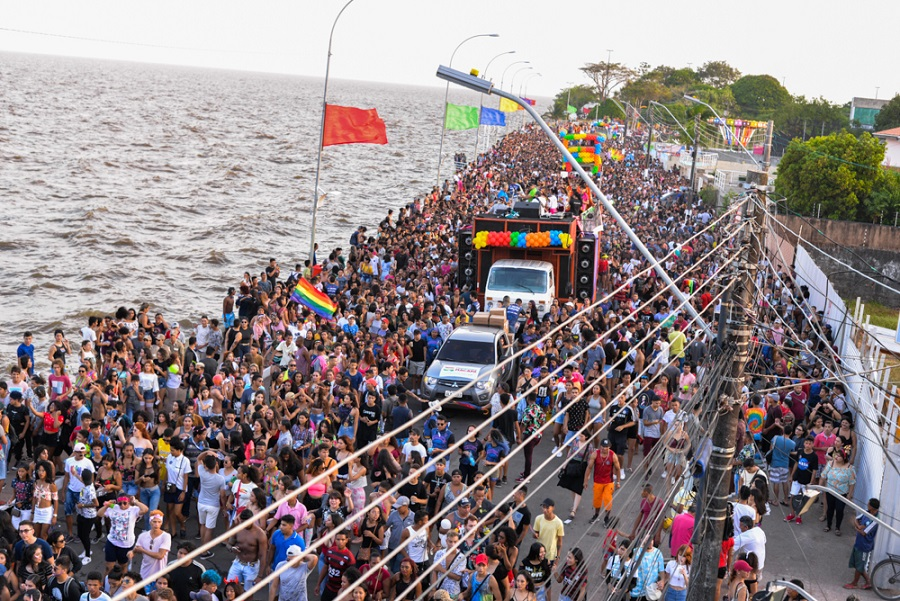
2019 LGBT Pride Parade of Macapá

Lesbian, gay, bisexual, transgender and queer (LGBTQ) rights in the Brazilian state of Amapá have had relevant legal advances in the 21st century.

== Legality of same-sex sexual activity ==
In 1830, Brazilian Emperor Dom Pedro I sanctioned the Imperial Penal Code, removing all references to sodomy from Brazilian law. Amapá was disputed by France as the Republic of Independent Guiana, but sodomy laws were repealed in 1791 during the French Revolution. Before becoming a federative unit of Brazil in 1943, Amapá was incorporated into the state of Pará as Araguari.

== Recognition of same-sex unions ==
Same-sex marriage has been legal in Amapá since 2013 via a decision by the National Council of Justice, in compliance with a previous decision of the Supreme Federal Court in 2011.

Before 2013, there were no formal state-level legal provisions recognizing same-sex marriage or civil unions in Amapá, though some couples lived in stable same-sex unions, as noted by IBGE data from that year. In 2015, Justice Court of Amapá State organized the first same-sex collective wedding of the North Region, and it happened again in subsequent years, including Afro-religious ceremonial wedding in 2025.

== Adoption and parenting ==
Since 2010, same-sex adoption has been officially nationwide through a decision by the Supreme Federal Court.

There are public records of adoption concessions in the Amapaense Court, such as the case that occurred in 2016, in which a homosexual couple from the municipality of Santana managed, after six years of judicial proceedings, to adopt a child.

In 2017, the Legislative Assembly of Amapá approved a bill that extends the benefits of maternity or paternity leave for same-sex couples who adopt children, ensuring labor rights equivalent to those of heteroaffective families.

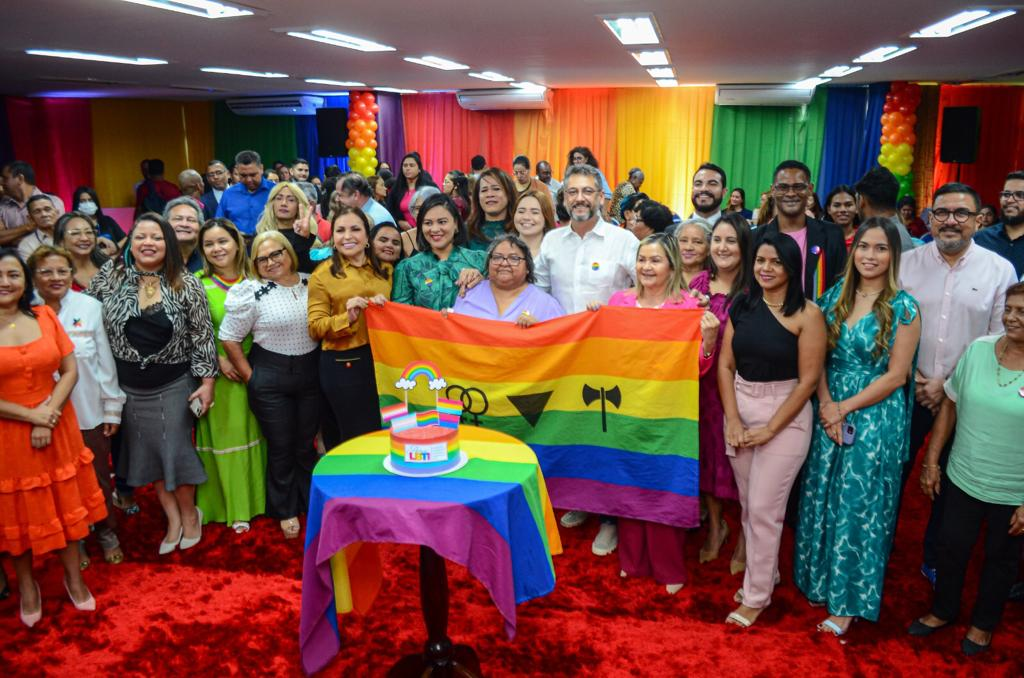
Clécio Luis at the creation of the Special Commission of Diversity Promotion, 2023 International Pride Day in Palácio do Setentrião

In mid-2025, the Court of Justice of Amapá (TJAP) launched the campaign "Every form of love can also be family". The initiative follows CNJ Resolution No. 532/2023 and aims to ensure that same-sex couples and transgender people do not suffer any kind of discrimination during the adoption qualification process in the state.

The TJAP also has records of promotion to the recognition of these families, having promoted events such as the "Wedding in the Community" for same-sex couples (held in 2019), which strengthens legal certainty for future joint adoptions.

== Hate crimes and discrimination law ==
Law No. 1,417/2009 establishes administrative sanctions for those who practice discrimination motivated by sexual orientation and gender identity within the state public service. State Law No. 1,680/2012 established the State Day to Combat Homophobia, which was celebrated annually on May 27.

In 2019, discrimination based on sexual orientation and gender identity was nationwide banned through a decision by the Supreme Federal Court.

The state government has also campaigns promoting the State Law No. 2,790/2022, which makes discrimination based on sexual orientation and gender identity a crime. State legislation, through Ordinary Law No. 2,710/2022, prohibits and typifies as administrative offense any act of racism and anti-LGBTQ discrimination practiced in state sports places, such as football stadiums.

In addition to the laws, Amapá has public policies and defense bodies, such as the State Council for Combating Discrimination and CELGBT, which act in the formulation of awareness campaigns and in repudiation of discriminatory actions against the LGBTQIAPN+ population.

== Gender identity and expression ==
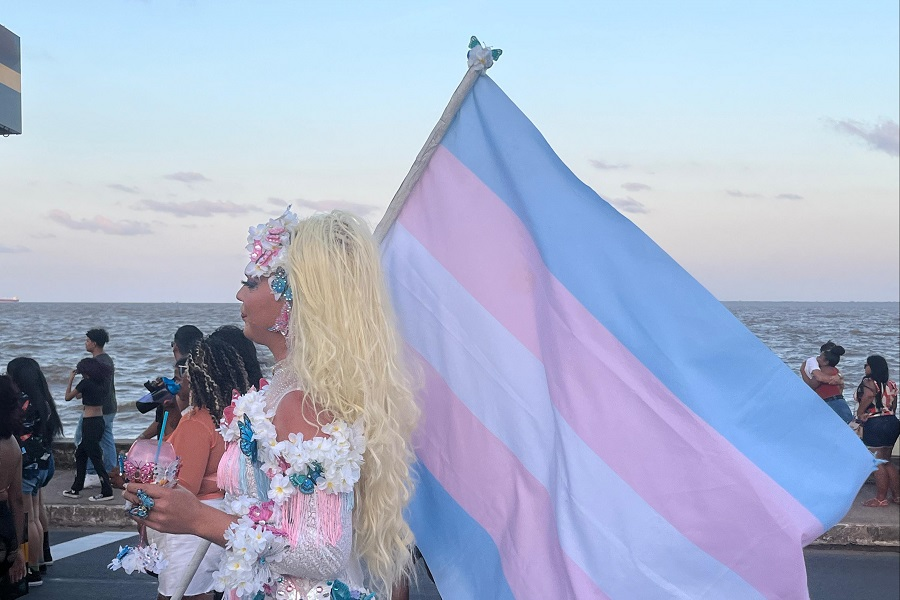
Trans flag hold at the 2023 Macapá LGBT Pride Parade

The Supreme Federal Court of Brazil ruled on 1 March 2018, that a transgender person has the right to change their official name and sex without the need of surgery or professional evaluation, just by self-declaration of their psychosocial identity.

State University of Amapá (UEAP) has transgender quotas for undergraduation since 2019.

Since 2022, Public Defender of Amapá made it accessible for non-binary people to legally change their gender.

Macapá City Hall launched in 2025 the first Municipal Trans Outpatient Clinic for assisting public gender-affirming care through the Unified Health System. Statewide, Amapá assist gender-affirming services through University Hospital, of Federal University of Amapá, and AMA-LBTI Center (Portuguese: Centro de Referência em Acolhimento às Mulheres Lésbicas, Bissexuais, Travestis, Transexuais e Intersexo).

The Army announced that the situation of non-binary individuals would be treated in the same manner as that of intersex individuals, so that any Brazilian in the draft cohort who expresses a gender identity other than male and holds a final, unappealable court ruling or a civil registry amendment will be considered exempt from mandatory military service, as they do not meet the requirements set forth in the Federal Constitution, the Military Service Law, its implementing regulations, and the 2024 General Conscription Plan.
