= LGBTQ rights in Goiás =

LGBTQ rights in Goías
- Legal status: Legal since 1830, age of consent equalised
- Gender identity: Gender change allowed, official standard for altering legal sex doesn't require surgery since 2018
- Military: Allowed to serve openly
- Discrimination protections: Yes, since 2019

Family rights
- Recognition of relationships: Same-sex marriage since 2013
- Adoption: Legal since 2015

Lesbian, gay, bisexual, transgender and queer (LGBTQ) people in the Brazilian state of Goías enjoy many of the same legal protections available to non-LGBTQ people. Homosexuality is legal in the state.

== Legality ==
Same-sex sexual activity has been legal in Brazil since 1830.

Same-sex marriage has been legal in Goiás since 2013 via a decision by the National Council of Justice, in compliance with a previous decision of the Supreme Federal Court in 2011.

Since 2015, same-sex adoption has been officially permitted in the state through a decision by the Supreme Federal Court.

== Hate crimes and discrimination law ==
In 2019, discrimination based on sexual orientation and gender identity was banned through a decision by the Supreme Federal Court.

The state of Goiás has decrees, such as Decree No. 9,755/2020, that establish guidelines and define LGBTphobic violence (including discrimination, bullying, and cyberbullying).

== Gender identity and expression ==
The Supreme Federal Court of Brazil ruled on 1 March 2018, that a transgender person has the right to change their official name and sex without the need of surgery or professional evaluation, just by self-declaration of their psychosocial identity.

On 3 July 2014, the Goiás State Board of Education approved a rule authorizing transgender and travesti students to use their social names in schools.

In 2015, the city of Novo Gama enacted a law prohibiting transgender people from using public restrooms in accordance with their gender identity. The law was challenged by the Associação Nacional de Travestis e Transexuais, prompting Supreme Court Justice Cármen Lúcia to set a deadline of 11 June 2024, for the municipal government to provide an explanation regarding the law.

=== Third gender option ===
In February 2020, Mar Dias, a non-binary person, sought assistance from the Public Defender's Office of the State of Goiás to change their documents to reflect their gender identity. After the registry offices initially denied the Public Defender's request, the Public Defender's Office petitioned the Court of Justice of Goiás to rectify Mar's documents. The Court issued a favorable decision on 28 August 2023.

On 29 January 2025, Kali Julie Dias sought assistance from the state's Public Defender's Office to change her name and gender marker on her documents. Following a lawsuit filed by the Public Defender's Office, a court in Goianira authorized the name change, but not the gender change, citing the absence of a specific law for the recognition of non-binary individuals. The Public Defender's Office appealed to the Court of Justice, which authorized the change of gender marker on 12 December 2025.

== Education ==
On 20 February 2020, Supreme Court Justice Alexandre de Moraes issued a preliminary injunction striking down a 2015 law from the city of Novo Gama that banned the teaching of "gender ideology" in the city's schools. The Supreme Court voted unanimously to struck down the law on April 25.

On 12 December 2021, the mayor of Águas Lindas de Goiás, Lucas de Carvalho Antonietti, signed a law prohibiting the use of gender-neutral language in the city's schools. The law was overturned by a preliminary injunction issued by Justice Alexandre de Moraes in May 2024, and struck down by the Supreme Federal Court in March 2026.

On 24 August 2022, the Legislative Assembly of Goiás approved a bill to ban discussions on sexuality and gender—referred to as "gender ideology"—in the state's schools. The bill has not yet been signed into law or vetoed by the state governor.

== Summary table ==
Same-sex sexual activity legal	Yes (Since 1830)
Equal age of consent	Yes (Since 1830)
Anti-discrimination laws in employment only	Yes (Since 2019)
Anti-discrimination laws in the provision of goods and services	Yes (Since 2019)
Anti-discrimination laws in all other areas (Incl. indirect discrimination, hate speech)	Yes (Since 2019)
LGBTQ subjects free from censorship in education	Yes (Since 2026)
Transgender people allowed to use restrooms and other gender-segregated spaces that correspond with their gender identity	Yes / No (Banned in Novo Gama since 2015)
Same-sex marriages	Yes (Since 2013)
Recognition of same-sex couples	Yes (Since 2011)
Stepchild adoption by same-sex couples	Yes (Nationwide since 2015)
Joint adoption by same-sex couples	Yes (Nationwide since 2015)
LGBTQ people allowed to serve openly in the military	Yes
Right to change legal gender	Yes (Since 2008; gender self-identification since 2018)
Third gender option	Yes / No (Allowed in some cases, without specific legislation)
Conversion therapy by medical professionals banned	Yes (Since 1999 for homosexuals and since 2018 for transgender people)
Access to IVF for lesbians	Yes (Since 2013)
Commercial surrogacy for gay male couples	No (Banned for any couple regardless of sexual orientation)
MSMs allowed to donate blood	Yes (Since 2020)
