= ADPF 787 =

Trans' rights case of the Supreme Court of Brazil

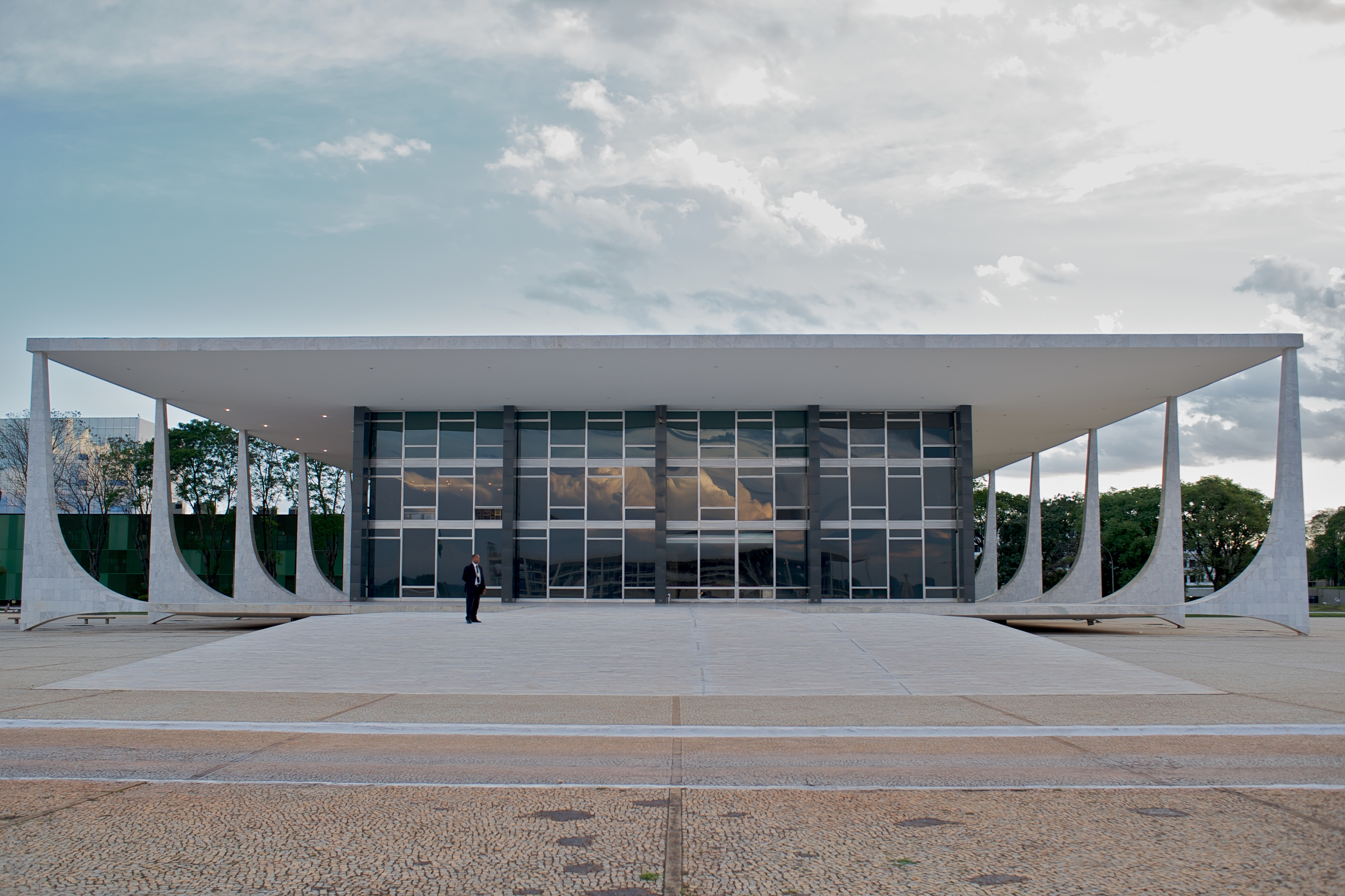
- Court: Supreme Federal Court
- Full case name: Arguição de Descumprimento de Preceito Fundamental 787 (Workers' Party (PT) v. Minister of Health of Brazil)
- Started: 28 June 2021 (3 years ago)
- Decided: 28 June 2024

Court membership
- Judges sitting: President Luiz Fux Justices: Gilmar Mendes; Roberto Barroso; Edson Fachin; Ricardo Lewandowski; Cármen Lúcia; Nunes Marques; André Mendonça; Alexandre de Moraes; Dias Toffoli; Rosa Weber

Case opinions
- Decision by: Mendes
- Concurrence: Barroso, Fachin, Fux, Lewandowski, Lúcia, Marques, Mendonça, de Moraes, Toffoli, Weber

Keywords
- Transgender rights in Brazil

ADPF 787 was a case of the Supreme Court of Brazil concerning ease of access of transgender people to public healthcare in Brazil, provided by the Sistema Único de Saúde (SUS). The case's rapporteur, minister Gilmar Mendes, cast the initial vote asserting the right of any person, regardless of gender, to access healthcare they require, and the Court unanimously agreed.

Specifically, the case concerned ease of access of transgender people to traditionally gendered care, such as gynecology and urology. Computer systems in place would sometimes prevent requests for appointments by people with the "incorrect" gender, which disproportionally affected transgender people. The Court unanimously ruled that such systems must be altered and improved to prevent further exclusions.

== Background ==
The case was requested by the Workers' Party in objection to obstacles encountered by transgender people, during the presidency of Jair Bolsonaro, while attempting to access the country's public healthcare system.

According to the Workers' Party, transgender people who alter their name in civil records to reflect their gender identities haven't had access to health services corresponding to their biological sex. That is, transsexual men and transmasculine people with their names already rectified, but that maintain the feminine reproductive apparatus, do not have access to appointments and treatment with gynecologists and obstetricians, while transsexual women and transvestites also have been denied access to medical specialties such as urology and proctology.

— Supreme Court press release

Minister Gilmar Mendes, as the case's rapporteur, cast the initial vote asserting the right of any person, regardless of gender, to access healthcare they require. Additionally, Mendes required the Ministry of Health implement a series of changes. Among them:

- The adaptation of SUS to allow for exams and appointments of all specialties, regardless of the patient's gender, avoiding bureaucratic procedures that may cause embarrassment or difficulty of access to transsexual persons;
- That changes are not restricted to appointments of SUS, but apply to all information systems in the public health network;
- That the Ministry of Health inform state and municipal governments of changes made to SUS' systems, and that it also aid in the local systems' transition.

In May 2024, in response to the case, the Ministry of Health officially removed gender requirements from 271 medical procedures, including vasectomies and childbirth.

Ministers Alexandre de Moraes, Ricardo Lewandowski and Rosa Weber all concurred, but voting was halted as Nunes Marques requested a review of the case. Lewandowski and Weber have both since retired and been replaced by Cristiano Zanin and Flávio Dino, respectively; new ministers are usually not expected to recast their seats' vote.

Voting resumed with ministers Edson Fachin and Dias Toffoli's concurring votes, forming a majority. On 28 June 2024, ministers Roberto Barroso, Luiz Fux, Cármen Lúcia, Nunes Marques and André Mendonça all voted with the rapporteur, bringing the Court to a unanimous concurrence.

Minister Marques concurred in part, arguing there had been no omission by the State, but that the proposed changes are necessary. Ministers Fachin, Lúcia and Barroso concurred and additionally proposed that the Live Birth Declaration (Portuguese: Declaração de Nascido Vivo, DNV) (Note: In Brazil, the Live Birth Declaration is a document prepared by a doctor reporting on the circumstances of a successful birth. The document must then be brought to a Notary Office in order to issue a birth certificate.) should include the parents' gender identification.

== High Court decision ==
=== Judiciary representation ===
Supreme Court members	Ministers	Yes	No
Gilmar Mendes	1	1	
Roberto Barroso	1	1	
Edson Fachin	1	1	
Luiz Fux	1	1	
Ricardo Lewandowski	1	1	
Cármen Lúcia	1	1	
Nunes Marques	1	1	
André Mendonça	1	1	
Alexandre de Moraes	1	1	
Dias Toffoli	1	1	
Rosa Weber	1	1	
Total	11	11	00

== See also ==
- Transgender rights in Brazil
- Healthcare in Brazil
