= LGBTQ rights in Piauí =

- Legal status: Legal since 1830, age of consent equalised
- Gender identity: Gender change allowed, official standard for altering legal sex doesn't require surgery since 2018
- Military: Allowed to serve openly
- Discrimination protections: Since 2019

Family rights
- Recognition of relationships: Same-sex marriage since 2013
- Adoption: Legal since 2010

Lesbian, gay, bisexual, transgender and queer (LGBTQ) people in Piauí, a state of Brazil located in the country's Northeast Region enjoy many of the same legal protections available to non-LGBTQ people. Homosexuality is legal in the state.

== Recognition of same-sex marriages ==
- On December 14, 2012, the Court of Justice of Piauí began granting same-sex couples marriage licenses through all notaries statewide, thus ending a long struggle for marriage equality in state. Now, couples do not need to have a judge's approval to get married. This change was published officially in the Diário de Justiça of this state on December 17, 2012.

== Adoption and parenting ==
=== Cases ===
2012: Judge Maria Luiza de Moura de Melo e Freitas, of the 1st Children and Youth Court, granted adoption rights to a lesbian couple who had been living together in a stable union since 2007.

== Gender identity and expression ==
In March 2018, the Brazilian Supreme Federal Court unanimously ruled that transgender people may change their legal gender without undergoing surgery or hormonal therapy, which were previously requirements. A transgender individual seeking to change their gender to reflect their gender identity can now simply apply to do so at a registry post in the country, without the need of a judicial document or any medical report.

On November 10, 2009, the Legislative Assembly of Piauí enacted Ordinary Law No. 5,916, which authorizes transgender and travesti individuals to use their chosen name on official documents.

On July 20, 2021, the Court of Justice of Piauí authorized, for the first time, a non-binary person to rectify their documents to reflect their gender identity.

On June 17, 2026, the Teresina City Council approved, by a vote of 12 in favor, 5 against, and one abstention, a bill to prohibit transgender women and travestis from using women's public restrooms. LGBTQ rights activists protested against the bill's approval, claiming it is unconstitutional. On July 30, the city's mayor, Sílvio Mendes (UNIÃO), signed the bill into law.

== Laws against discrimination ==
On December 29, 2004, the Governor of Piauí signed Ordinary Law No. 5,431, banning discrimination based on sexual orientation.

Since 2019, discrimination based on gender identity has been prohibited nationwide in Brazil, through a decision by the Supreme Federal Court.

== Life conditions ==
=== Anti-LGBTQ violence ===
In a 2015 report by the Grupo Gay da Bahia, Piauí was listed as the second Brazilian state with the highest risk of LGBTQ people being murdered.

=== Pride parades ===
On September 4, 2025, the Legislative Assembly of Piauí enacted Law No. 8,808, which declares the Teresina Diversity Parade an intangible cultural heritage. On May 9, 2024, the governor of Piauí, Rafael Fonteles, signed Law No. 8.371/2024, which declares the Parnaíba Pride Parade an intangible cultural heritage.

The 23rd edition of the Teresina Diversity Parade, in 2025, featured a performance by singer Linn da Quebrada.
