= Gilvan da Federal =

Brazilian police officer and politician

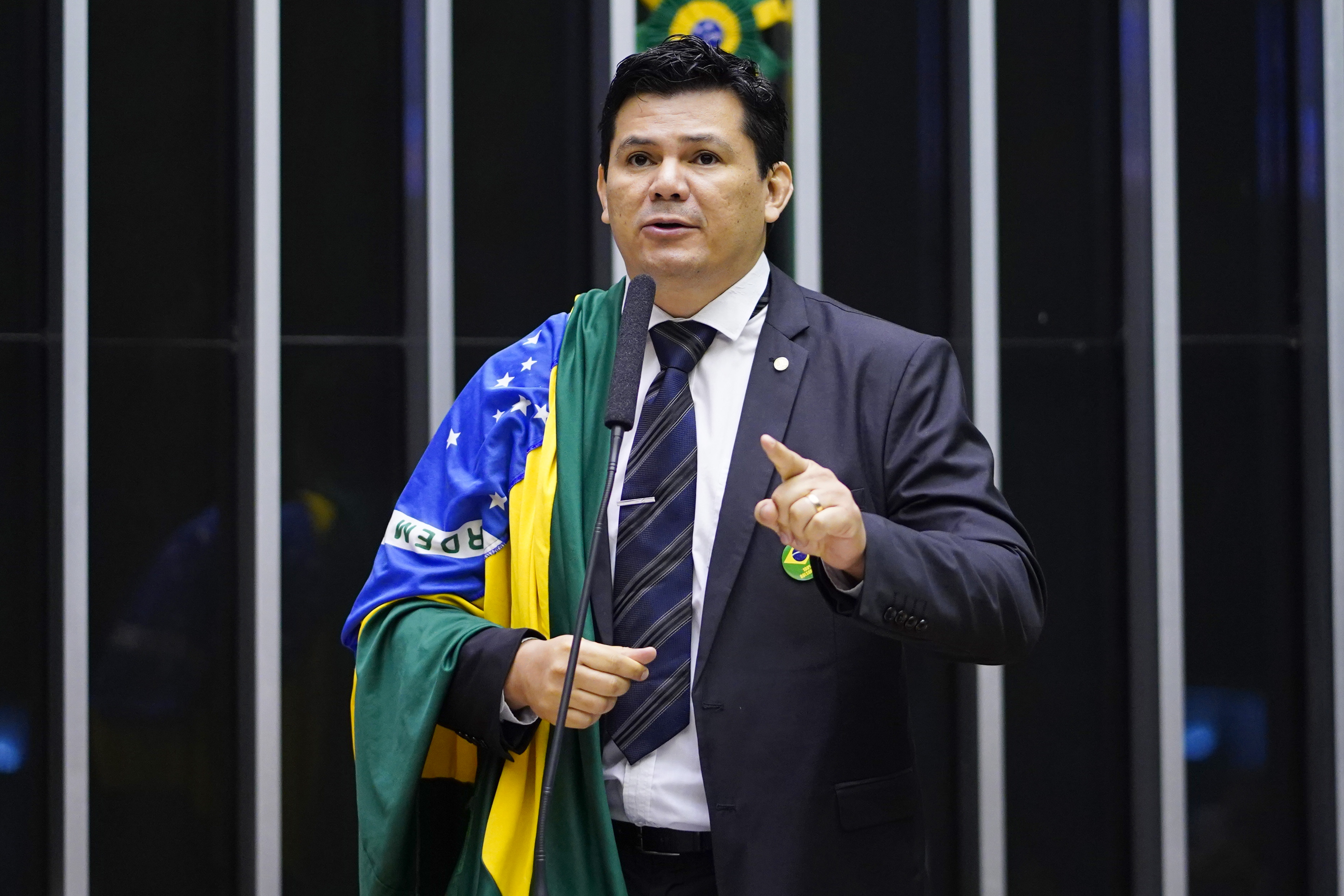

Federal Deputy for Espirito Santo
- Incumbent
- Assumed office February 1, 2023

Personal details
- Born: Gilvan Aguiar Costa; September 24, 1976 (age 50) Araioses, Maranhao, Brazil
- Party: PL (2022–present)
- Profession: Police officer Politician

Gilvan Aguiar Costa, also officially known as Gilvan da Federal' (born in Araioses, September 24, 1976) is a Brazilian federal police officer of the Federal Highway Police and a politician, affiliated with the Liberal Party (PL).

He has been a federal deputy for Espírito Santo since 2023. He obtained 87,994 of the votes (4.22%).

He was a city councilor of the city of Vitória from 2020 to 2022.
