= LGBTQ rights in Espírito Santo =

Lesbian, gay, bisexual, transgender and queer (LGBTQ) people in the Brazilian state of Espírito Santo enjoy many of the protections available to non-LGBTQ people. Despite this, according to data from the Agência Diadorim, the number of anti-LGBTQ bills has been growing in the state.

== Recognition of same-sex unions ==
On 3 August 2012, a judge in Colatina authorized Ediana Calixto and Kamila Roccon, a lesbian couple, to register their marriage, making it the first same-sex marriage to be recognized in the state. The state Public Prosecutor's Office appealed the decision, causing the recognition of the marriage to be revoked on August 15. On September 20, the state Court of Justice reversed the decision and authorized the recognition of the couple.

On 15 August 2012, the General Inspectorate of Justice of the State of Espírito Santo issued a Circular Letter stating that all Civil Regestries of that State should address same-sex marriage the same way they would do it regarding that for opposite-sex couples, making it the third Brazilian State to deal with this subject in its State jurisdiction.

== Discrimination protections ==
On 17 July 2007, the mayor of Colatina, João Guerino Balestrassi, signed a law prohibiting discrimination based on sexual orientation and gender identity.

In 2012, the Legislative Assembly of Espírito Santo enacted a constitutional amendment to prohibit discrimination based on sexual orientation.

On 13 January 2019, the Supreme Federal Court ruled that discrimination based on sexual orientation and gender identity is illegal nationwide.

== Gender identity and expression ==
The Supreme Federal Court of Brazil (STF) ruled on 1 March 2018, that a transgender person has the right to change their official name and sex without the need of surgery or professional evaluation, just by self-declaration of their psychosocial identity.

On 6 June 2022, the Vitória City Council approved a bill to ban the installation of unisex restrooms in the city. The bill has not yet been vetoed or signed into law by the city's mayor.

On 14 April 2024, the Legislative Assembly of Espírito Santo approved a bill to restrict athletes' participation in competitions based on biological sex. On April 28, the bill was vetoed by Governor Renato Casagrande (PSB).

On 22 January 2025, the Public Defender's Office of Espírito Santo filed a lawsuit to secure the right to name and gender rectification for a non-binary person from Vitória. The court granted the Public Defender's Office's request and authorized the rectification.

On 27 June 2025, the Legislative Assembly of Espírito Santo, in partnership with the state Public Defender's Office, held a free event to facilitate name and gender changes on official documents for trans, non-binary, and travesti individuals.

== Education ==
In 2015, the city of Cachoeiro de Itapemirim passed a law prohibiting "ideological indoctrination" in schools.

On 21 June 2025, the Legislative Assembly of Espírito Santo approved a law allowing parents to prohibit their children from participating in classes on LGBTQ topics. LGBTQ rights organizations have filed a lawsuit against the law in the Supreme Federal Court (STF). On 30 July 2025, the case rapporteur, Justice Cármen Lúcia, granted a 5-day deadline for the state government and the Legislative Assembly to provide an explanation regarding the law. On 4 August, the Legislative Assembly sent a document in response, signed by the Speaker of the House, Marcelo Santos, stating that the law was not intended to be discriminatory and that the teaching of gender could be perceived by families as an ideology. On 21 November of the same year, the Supreme Court began hearing the case.

In May 2026, the Supreme Court struck down the state law by an 8–2 vote. Justice Cármen Lúcia stated that the law violated the Brazilian Constitution.

== Life conditions ==
During a session of the Vitória City Council held on 5 April 2022, councilman Gilvan da Federal opposed the inclusion of trans councilwoman Deborah Sabará in a motion of commendation for International Women's Day, stating that "God made man and woman; the rest are alligators." In June 2022, the 10th Criminal Court of Vitória accepted the Public Prosecutor's Office's charges against da Federal. On 9 December 2025, he was sentenced to 2 years and 11 months in prison and ordered to pay R$20,000.00 in compensation for transphobia.

According to data from the Brazilian Public Security Yearbook, released on 20 July 2023, Espírito Santo was the state with the largest increase in homicides of LGBTQ individuals in Brazil, with the number rising from 2 in 2021 to 9 in 2022—an increase of 350%. There was also an increase in rapes of LGBTQ individuals, which rose from 7 cases in 2021 to 19 in 2022, an increase of 171.4%.

Data from the 2025 Brazilian Public Security Yearbook indicated that reports of crimes against LGBTQ individuals increased by 64%, with 102 complaints of homophobia and transphobia, 491 of bodily injury, and 30 of rape.

On 16 March 2023, a court in Espírito Santo ordered prosecutor Santo Clóvis Barbosa Figueira to pay R$ 12,700 in damages to Senator Fabiano Contarato and his husband, following homophobic remarks made in 2017 during the adoption process for one of their children.
