= Federal Council of Medicine =

Brazilian independent public agency

- Conselho Federal de Medicina
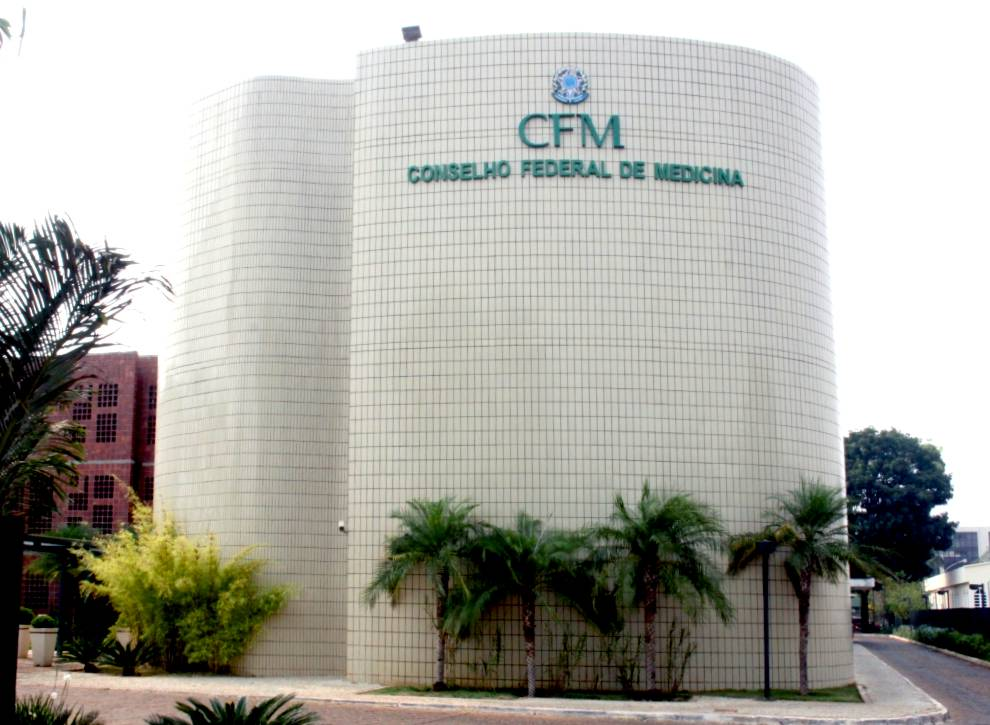
- Council's headquarters in Brasília
- Abbreviation: CFM
- Formation: 26 January 1951; 75 years ago
- Purpose: "To be recognized nationally as an institution capable of acting with excellence through good ethical and technical practice in the provision of medical services."
- Professional title: Professional association
- Headquarters: SGAS 616, Conjunto D, Lote 115, L2 Sul, Brasília, Federal District, Brazil
- Region served: Brazil
- Official language: Brazilian portuguese
- President: José Hiran Gallo (PDB)
- Revenue: R$ 35.3 million (2022)
- Website: portal.cfm.org.br

The Conselho Federal de Medicina (CFM, Portuguese for Federal Council of Medicine) is the Brazilian independent public agency of the Ministry of Work and Employment officially in charge of professional regulation and medical licensing in the area of medicine in the country. It is headquartered in Brasília, in the federal district.

The CFM is represented by a regional council in each Brazilian state, which have essentially the same mission as the federal council at state level, including issuing the annual license to practice medicine to physicians, which is valid within that state only. The councils are supported by annual contributions required of all those practicing medicine in Brazil. The councilors are necessarily doctors, who are elected by their peers for a purely honorary office, without any remuneration.

In addition to the notary functions, such as professional registration of doctors and their titles, the Federal Council and the Medical Board are, under law, the supervisory bodies of professional ethics, which it must ensure and work, by all means at its disposal, toward the perfect performance of ethical medicine and the prestige and good reputation of the profession.

To fulfill its statutory functions, the regional councils function as courts, hearing complaints against physicians and establishing the ethical and professional punishments when there is evidence of ethical violations. The penalties, as provided by law, may consist of confidential warnings, private censure, public censure, suspension of professional practice for 30 days, and forfeiture of professional practice. The decisions of regional councils can be appealed to the Federal Council.

The Federal Council of Medicine is governed by an elected executive board and a council. It has dozens of technical committees in charge of studying and issuing recommendations and decrees related to the practice of medicine.
