= Paulo Iotti =

Brazilian lawyer

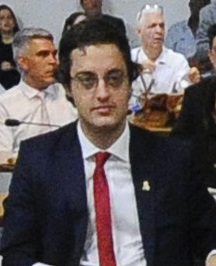
- Born: Paulo Roberto Iotti Vecchiatti; São Paulo, Brazil
- Education: Mackenzie Presbyterian University University Center of Bauru
- Occupations: Lawyer, activist

Paulo Roberto Iotti Vecchiatti (born in São Paulo) is a Brazilian lawyer and political activist. An LGBTQ rights activist, he has filed lawsuits seeking the criminalization of homophobia in Brazil.

== Biography ==
Born in São Paulo, Paulo Iotti holds a law degree from Mackenzie Presbyterian University and a master's and doctorate in constitutional law from the University Center of Bauru.

In 2019, as a lawyer, he argued before the Supreme Federal Court for the application of the anti-racism law to cases of homophobia and transphobia, a thesis that was accepted by the court.

Iotti was elected by Guia Gay São Paulo as one of the most influential LGBTQ people in Brazil in 2019.
