= Same-sex adoption in Brazil =

Child adoption for same-sex couples in Brazil

Legal status of adoption by same-sex couples around the world. Joint adoption and stepparent adoption legal Stepparent adoption legal

Same-sex adoption in Brazil is legal according to the Superior Court of Justice of Brazil, as stated in a court decision on April 27, 2010. The change was a milestone in the country's LGBTQ history.

The ministers (Justices) underlined that neither the Statute of Children and Adolescents of 1990, nor the Civil Code of 2002, much less the Federal Constitution of 1988, define any restrictions as to gender, marital status or sexual orientation of the adopter.

On August 16, 2010, the minister (Justice) Marco Aurélio Mello, of the STF (Supreme Federal Court of Brazil), ruled in favor of a same-sex couple, formed by a British citizen and a Brazilian, in the state of Paraná. This allowed the couple to adopt any child, regardless of age or sex of the child. The decision of the Supreme Federal Court opened the way for other same-sex couples to be accorded the same right in the country.

Adoption by homosexual individuals started in Brazil in 1996, the first recorded case occurring in the state of Rio de Janeiro. After this, several cases occurred in the rest of the country. Joint homosexual adoption started in Brazil in 2005. The first recorded case occurred in the state of Rio Grande do Sul, and subsequent cases have occurred in all five Regions of Brazil. The favorable decision by the Superior Court of Justice only solidified the cases which were already approved. In Brazil, 20% of same-sex couples have children. In the United States is 16%.

== History ==
Legal status of adoption by same-sex couples in South America Gay adoption legal Stepparent adoption legal Gay adoption illegal Homosexuality illegal Unknown/ambiguous

Examples of adoption by same-sex couples:

November 11, 2005 − the first LGBT adoption in Brazil, by a lesbian couple from the city of Bagé, Rio Grande do Sul. The judge of the Childhood and Youth of Bagé, Marcos Danilo Edon Franco, permitted the adoption of two brothers by a lesbian couple. The women had been living in a stable union for seven years. One of them had been responsible for the guardianship of the boys since their birth.

April 6, 2006 − a second adoption by a lesbian couple, and one "provisional guardianship". The adoption occurred in the State of Rio Grande do Sul, by a lesbian couple. Same-sex couples in committed relationships were allowed to register at any notary public office. Although it did not affect federal rights, it gave same-sex couples more equality in many areas. Same-sex couples who register have the right to jointly own property, establish custody of children, and claim the right to pensions and property when one partner dies.

November 23, 2006 − the Justice of the city of Catanduva, São Paulo authorized the adoption of a five-year-old child by a gay couple.

May 12, 2007 − the Justice of the city of Ribeirão Preto, São Paulo authorized the adoption of four children, all brothers and sisters, by a gay couple. Because the Law of Brazil does not allows the separation of siblings in adoption, so they all had to be adopted by the same couple, heterosexual or homosexual.

August 24, 2007 – the Justice of the city of Rio de Janeiro, Rio de Janeiro authorized the adoption of a child by a lesbian couple.

May 30, 2008 − In Acre, Judge Luana Cláudia de Albuquerque Campos of the Civil Court of the District of Senador Guiomard rendered a favorable decision involving a gay couple adopting a child. The child had already been adopted by one member of the couple at the age of one year. The couple had been living in a stable relationship for eight years.

October 9, 2008 − a decision of judge Élio Braz of the 2nd Court of Childhood and Adolescence in Recife, Pernambuco permitted the adoption of two sisters by a male homosexual couple of Natal, Rio Grande do Norte to be entered in the register of adoption. The girls, who were in a shelter, were given new birth certificates on which they appear as children of two parents. The Public Prosecutor agreed with the court ruling and declined to take further action. The judge said the decision is unique due to the joint request of two persons of one sex with an entry in the register, in the same manner as a heterosexual couple.

May 13, 2009 − a lesbian couple formed by an analyst and university professor Michele Kaners, 31, and Carla Regina Cumiotto, 37, from the city of Blumenau, in the State of Santa Catarina, won in court the right to adopt one girl and one boy. The decision allowed children to receive the surnames Kaners and Cumiotto, inherited from both partners. The same-sex adoption guarantees equal rights to those of biological children.

May 14, 2009 − a gay couple was the first to win in court the right of adoption in the Brazilian State of Paraná. A decision of the 2nd Court of Childhood, Youth and Adoption, changed the life of a homosexual couple who live in Curitiba. Two years previously, the gay couple had attempted to adopt a child. They had their request granted by a judge who ruled that the couple were living in a stable and affectionate union, and were able to raise a child of either sex and age in a healthy environment.

May 21, 2009 – the Justice of the city of Rio de Janeiro, Rio de Janeiro, authorized the adoption of two children by a lesbian couple.

June 10, 2009 − a lesbian couple was the first to win in court the right of adoption in the Brazilian State of Goiás. Since April 2008, a federal employee, 49, and a librarian, 34, had custody of a girl aged two years and ten months. The unprecedented decision was made by Judge Maurício Porfírio of the Juvenile Court of Childhood and Youth in Goiânia. To compensate for the lack of specific law on the issue, the magistrate relied on the precedent of the Court of Rio Grande do Sul.

July 23, 2009 − the Justice of the State of Mato Grosso granted the same-sex couple Júlio Castilho, 40, and Paulo Ciliato, 35, the adoption of two brothers, aged six and eight. The decision was declared by Judge Douglas Romão of the Court of Childhood and Youth of the District of Juara, a city located 690 km (428 mi) from Cuiabá, the capital of the state.

November 30, 2009 − the Justice of the city of Joinville, Santa Catarina, authorized the adoption of a three-year-old child by a lesbian couple. A birth certificate with the names of two mothers was ready 15 days later.

February 22, 2010 – the Justice of the city of Rio de Janeiro, Rio de Janeiro authorized the adoption of a child by a lesbian couple.

March 9, 2010 – the Justice of the city of Salvador, Bahia, authorized the adoption of a child by a lesbian couple.

April 27, 2010 − the Superior Court of Justice of Brazil decided to approve LGBT adoption in Brazil. In the case, a lesbian couple from the city of Bagé, Rio Grande do Sul, the physiotherapist Lídia Brignol Guterres and the psychologist Luciana Reis Maidana, had their right to share the adoption of two sons recognized. The physiotherapist and psychologist had been together for thirteen years and adopted two boys in 2002 and 2003.

April 29, 2010 − the Justice of the city of Cuiabá, Mato Grosso, authorized the adoption of a child by a gay couple in the city of Tangará da Serra. As a result of the adoption, the couple's daughter will enjoy food, property and inheritance benefits of both parents.

October 27, 2010 − the Justice of the city of Cascavel, Paraná, authorized the adoption of an eight-year-old child with cerebral palsy by a gay couple who had been living together for twelve years. The authorization is irreversible, according to Judge Sergio Luiz Kreuz, who granted the application for adoption based on the decision of the Superior Court of Justice.

November 16, 2010 − the Justice of the city of Boa Vista, Roraima, authorized the adoption of a two-year-old child by a gay couple, the course instructor Múcio Rosendo da Silva and the hairdresser Alexandre Lúcio de Farias. The biological mother gave evidence in the Court of Roraima, demonstrating a desire to give her daughter up for adoption by the couple.

April 19, 2011 – the Justice of the city of Araranguá, Santa Catarina, authorized the adoption of a two-year-old child by a lesbian couple.

May 24, 2011 – the Justice of the city of Belo Horizonte, Minas Gerais, authorized the adoption of a three-year-old child by a lesbian couple, that are residing in the interior city of Patos de Minas. The biological mother, that is heterosexual, gave evidence in the Court of Minas Gerais, demonstrating a desire to give her child up for adoption by the lesbian couple.

June 3, 2011 – the Justice of the city of Pelotas, Rio Grande do Sul, authorized the adoption of a four-year-old child by a gay couple. The biological mother, gave evidence demonstrating a desire to give her child up for adoption by the gay couple.

June 30, 2011 – the Justice of the city of Itapetininga, São Paulo, authorized the adoption of five children, three male and two female, by a gay couple.

August 30, 2011 – the Justice of the city of Jandira, São Paulo, authorized the adoption of a three-year-old child by a lesbian couple.

September 16, 2011 – the Justice of the city of Maringá, Paraná authorized the adoption of two children by a lesbian couple.

December 21, 2011 – the Justice of the city of Belém, Pará authorized the adoption of a two-year-old child by a lesbian couple.

January 11, 2012 – the Justice of the city of São Paulo authorized the adoption of a child by a lesbian couple.

March 2, 2012 – the Justice of the city of Recife, Pernambuco authorized the adoption of a baby by a gay couple.

November 11, 2012 – the Justice of the city of Manaus, Amazonas authorized the adoption of a child by a gay couple.

April 18, 2013 – the Justice of the city of Marituba, Pará authorized the adoption of a child by a lesbian couple.

April 19, 2013 – the Justice of the city of Aparecida de Goiânia, Goiás authorized the adoption of a child by a lesbian couple.

May 23, 2013 – the Justice of the city of Maceió, Alagoas authorized the adoption of four children by four same-sex couples.

== See also ==
- LGBT rights in the Americas
- LGBT rights in Brazil
- LGBT parenting
