= Legal status of homosexuality in Brazil =

During the Portuguese colonization of Brazil, homosexuality was illegal in the country between 1533 and 1830, due to the imposition of the Portuguese Penal Code, which was influenced by the British Buggery Act 1533.

In 1830, eight years after the end of the Portuguese domain, sodomy laws were eliminated from the new Penal Code of Brazil.

After the French overseas territories located in the Americas, Brazil was the first country in the New World and Southern Hemisphere to legalize homosexuality. Today in South America only Guyana, a former British colony, considers homosexuality illegal.

Since 1985 the Federal Council of Medicine of Brazil does not consider homosexuality as deviant. In 1999, the Federal Council of Psychology published a resolution that has standardized the conduct of psychologists face the question: "... psychologists did not collaborate with events or services proposing treatment and cure of homosexuality." In 1990, five years after Brazil removed homosexuality from its list of mental illnesses, the General Assembly of the World Health Organization (WHO), with headquarters in Geneva, Switzerland, removed homosexuality, in the International Classification of Diseases (ICD).

== See also ==
- LGBT rights in the Americas
- LGBT rights in Brazil
- LGBT rights by country or territory
- Sodomy laws
