= Ana Lúcia Martins =

Brazilian politician (born 1966)

Councilwoman for Joinville
- Incumbent
- Assumed office 1 January 2021

Personal details
- Born: 19 September 1988 (age 38) Joinville, Santa Catarina, Brazil
- Party: PT (1994–present)
- Spouse: Maurício Rosskamp
- Children: 2

Ana Lúcia Martins Rosskamp (born 20 August 1966) is a Brazilian literacy activist, physical education teacher, Black movement activist, professor, and politician. She was elected as councilwoman to the city of Joinville, in Santa Catarina state, during the 2020 municipal elections as part of the Workers' Party (PT), being the party's lone representative in the municipal chamber. She is the first Black woman to become councilor in the city's history. Soon after being elected, Martins was the target of death threats and racist attacks online. The intimidation and harassment she faced had national repercussions.

== Early life and career in education ==
Martins was born on 20 August 1966 in the Floresta neighborhood of Joinville. She is the daughter of Acácio Martins, a tractor driver and public servant, and Onélia Durvalina Martins, a domestic worker and operator. During her youth, she had a son, Alison, and due to this she had to stop her studies to work and support her child. She worked as a maid, a cleaner, and a store clerk.

In 1984, Martins concluded her teaching courses and began a career in education. In 1986, she began teaching in municipal schools in Joinville as a teacher in early childhood education. In 1990, she graduated with a degree in physical education. In 1992, she began to study African and Afro-Brazilian cultures and began to take part in the Black rights movement inside the Setorial do Negro of the Catholic organization Igreja Cristo Ressuscitado.

Martins is the widow of Maurício Eduardo Rosskamp, with whom she had a child. He had been a legislative consultant for the municipal council chamber since 1995. In December 2018, Rosskamp was killed in the Paranaguamirim neighborhood after having a stone thrown at his head during a robbery. In April 2019, the two responsible were sentenced to 30 years in prison for the murder.

== Political career ==
Martins began her political career in 1992, when she became a representative of the base of the Public Servants Union of Joinville (SINSEJ). In 1994, she became affiliated with the PT. In 2009, Martins participated in the creation of the Joinville Council of the Promotion of Racial Equality and also participated in the Committee of Racial Equality.

During the 2020 municipal elections, Martins ran to become a city councilor for the PT in Joinville and was elected with 3,126 votes, becoming the fourth most voted for candidate and the lone candidate from her party who was elected. The last time a left-wing candidate was elected to the municipal council was in 2012.

She took office on 1 January 2021. In her inaugural speech, she asked for permission from her ancestors and thanked the legacy of Rio de Janeiro city councilor Marielle Franco, declaring that "I am her seed". On the topic on what she would defend in the chamber, Martins pointed to her main legislative priorities such as education, culture, and the defense of human rights.

On 18 January 2021, she invited an official from the municipal secretary of health to advocate for the inclusion of homeless people and people from quilombola communities as priority groups for COVID-19 vaccinations, since they had not been expressly written into both municipal and state plans for immunization programs. After the request, the healthy secretary of Joinville, Jean Rodrigues da Silva, confirmed that people from the quilombolas would be included as a priority group. However, on 3 February, the municipal secretary rescinded the policy and said that they would follow the vaccination schedule laid out by the state and federal governments, which did not include people from the quilombolas.

== Racist threats and attacks ==
Martins became known nationally due to being the target of racist attacks and death threats by email and on social media, beginning after she was elected in 2020.

The Civil Police of Santa Catarina started an inquiry and the case has been under the purview of offenses of racial harm and threats. On 22 November 2020, police identified a 22 year old white man as the main suspect behind the threats. Police investigations indicated that the attack was orchestrated by a neo-Nazi cell that had also made identical threats to transgender councilpeople Duda Salabert (PDT), from Belo Horizonte, and Benny Briolly (PSOL), from Niterói, Rio de Janeiro. According to professor Lola Aronovich, the threats follow the same standard as those made on the now defunct far-right imageboard Dogolachan.

In December 2020, the Civil Police solicited help from Interpol to collaborate with the investigations after discovering that one of the emails used in the threats and attacks was registered on a Swiss email server.

=== Repercussions ===
On 20 November 2020, protesters in Joinville participated in anti-racist acts in support of Martins and in defense of her mandate. There were also references made to Black Awareness Day, celebrated on the same day.

Santa Catarina state government received almost 5,000 requests for them to offer security personnel for Martins. People from all over the country sent emails to figures including former governor Carlos Moisés, the State Secretary of Public Safety and the State Public Ministry, requesting a car with tinted windows and an escort for the councilwoman, as well as making haste on the investigations.

After the case gained more national attention, the Santa Catarina Public Ministry announced the formation of a task-force specifically for the confrontation of racism in the state. Various entities, institutions, and political figures repudiated the threats suffered by Martins.

On 29 October 2021, she was sent a letter by the United Nations denouncing threats against Black female deputies, councilwomen, and candidates during that year's elections. In it, other acts of violence that year were cited, and the writers of the letter expressed worry for Martins' safety.

== See also ==
- Antonieta de Barros
- Marielle Franco
- Racism in Brazil
