= Cachoeira (disambiguation) =

Cachoeira (Portuguese meaning waterfall) may refer to several places in Brazil:

- populated places:
  - Cachoeira, a city in Bahia state
  - Cachoeira Alta, Goiás
  - Cachoeira do Arari, Pará
  - Cachoeira do Campo, Minas Gerais
  - Cachoeira Dourada, Goiás, Goiás
  - Cachoeira Dourada, Minas Gerais, Minas Gerais
  - Cachoeira de Goiás, Goiás
  - Cachoeira Grande, Maranhão
  - Cachoeira dos Índios, Paraíba
  - Cachoeira de Minas, Minas Gerais
  - Cachoeira de Pajeú, Minas Gerais
  - Cachoeira Paulista, São Paulo
  - Cachoeira do Piriá, Pará
  - Cachoeira da Prata, Minas Gerais
  - Cachoeira do Sul, Rio Grande do Sul
  - Cachoeiras de Macacu, Rio de Janeiro
  - Cachoeirinha, a neighborhood of Belo Horizonte
  - Carmo da Cachoeira, Minas Gerais
  - Nova Cachoeirinha, a neighborhood of Belo Horizonte
  - São Gabriel da Cachoeira, Amazonas
  - Três Cachoe, Rio Grande do Sul
- rivers:
  - Cachoeira River (disambiguation), several rivers

== See also ==
- Cachoeiras (disambiguation)
- Cachoeirinha
