= Guanabara =

Guanabara may refer to:

- Guanabara (state), a former state in Brazil
- Guanabara Bay, a bay in Brazil
- Guanabara (Joinville), a neighborhood in Santa Catarina state, Brazil
- Jardim Guanabara, a neighborhood in Rio de Janeiro state, Brazil
- Guanabara Esporte Clube
- Taça Guanabara
- MV Guanabara
