= Araquari =

- Municipality
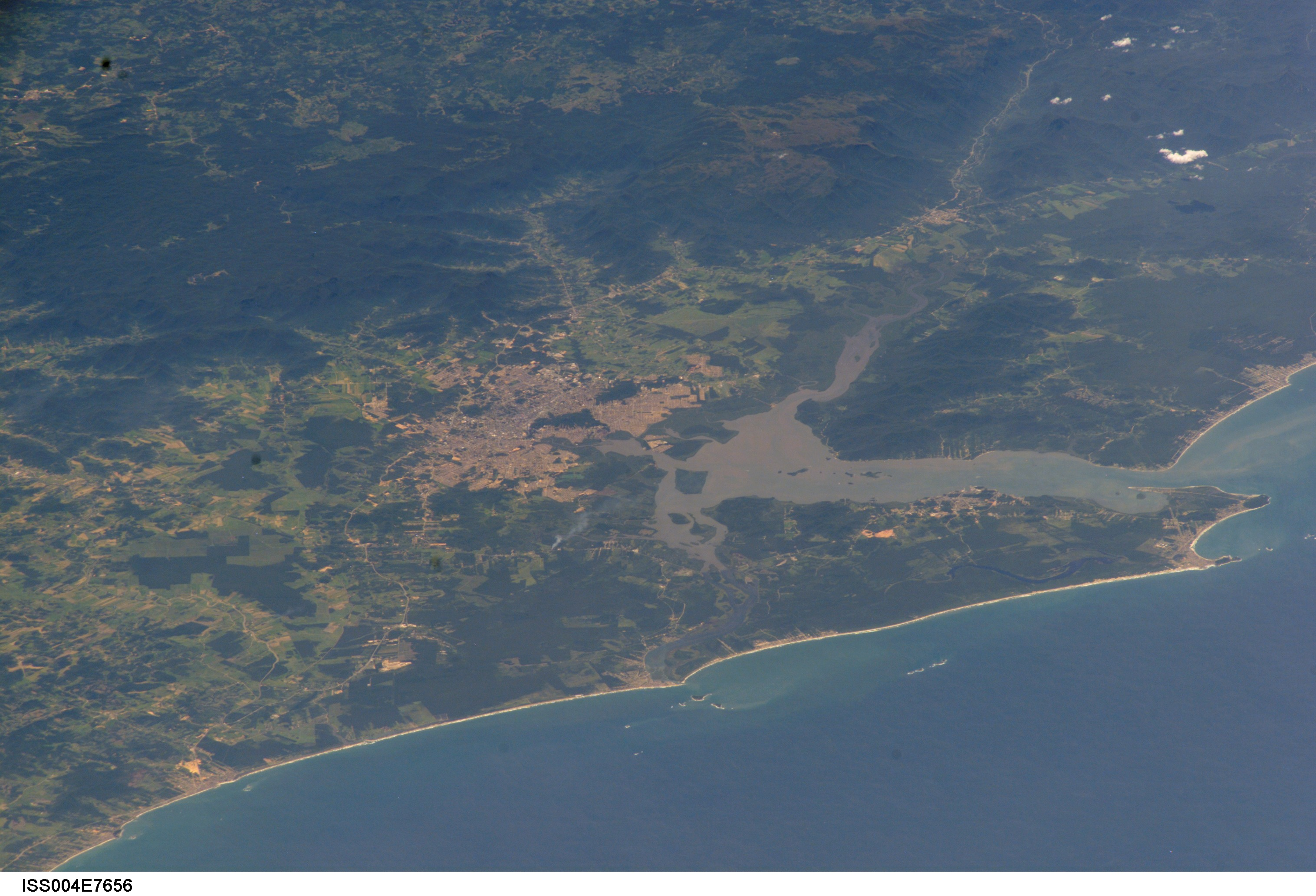
- ISS image from 2005 showing the city of Joinville (center) with the Baía da Babitonga, Araquari (center below), to the right São Francisco do Sul with the coast of the South Atlantic.

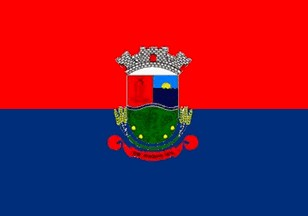
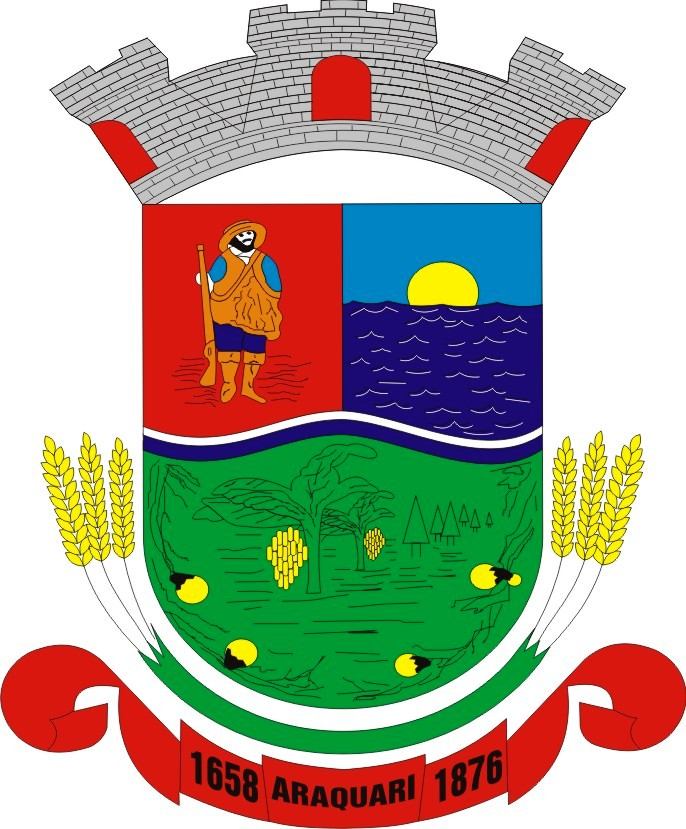
- Flag Coat of arms

- Location in Brazil
- Coordinates: 26°23′S 48°43′W
- Country: Brazil
- Region: South
- State: Santa Catarina
- Mesoregion: Norte Catarinense

Government
  - Prefeito: João Pedro Woitexem, (PMDB)

Area
  - Total: 148,261 sq mi (383,993 km^{2})
- Elevation: 30 ft (9 m)

Population (2020)
  - Total: 39,524
- Time zone: UTC−3 (BRT)
- Postal code: 89245-000
- Website: www.araquari.sc.gov.br

Araquari is a municipality in the state of Santa Catarina in the South region of Brazil.

The municipality of Araquari was basically colonized by Azorean immigrants, who arrived at the coast of Santa Catarina between 1748 and 1756. Since then, the Azorean culture rooted up and walked hand in hand with the most diverse cultures, as with the Indigenous peoples in Brazil and Africans, both important in this region thus creating a cultural and religious mosaic.

Like many coastal cities Araquari has its founding myth linked to the European occupation process in America, in the first phase of the age of discoveries. According to information from the municipal Department of Culture the European foundation of Araquari is set 40 years after the discovery of Brazil in 1500.

The Spanish navigator Álvar Núñez Cabeza de Vaca landed what is now Barra Velha and encouraged the exploration of the northern region, until then inhabited by Indios. The expedition consisted of 250 men, 40 horses, some slaves and indoctrinated group of Indios by the Jesuits. A month later, they came what they called first Paranaguá Mirim, ("small cove") in Tupi-Guarani.

In 1658, the first Portuguese pioneers settled in the region inhabited by Carijós, but the actual foundation of the town only happened in 1848, when a Portuguese ship arrived in Paraty under the command of Manuel Vieira de Albuquerque Touvar, who founded a small colony. Another pioneer, Joaquim da Rocha Coutinho, joined him and the two decided to found a village, but failed to reach an agreement on the site.

The Judge of the District of São Francisco ruled in favor of Rocha Coutinho who built homes on the banks of the river Parati, surrounding pastures and crops. Both are considered to be the founders of the parish Senhor Bom Jesus do Paraty (Good Lord Jesus of Paraty) in 1854, but still part of the municipality of São Francisco do Sul.

== BMW ==
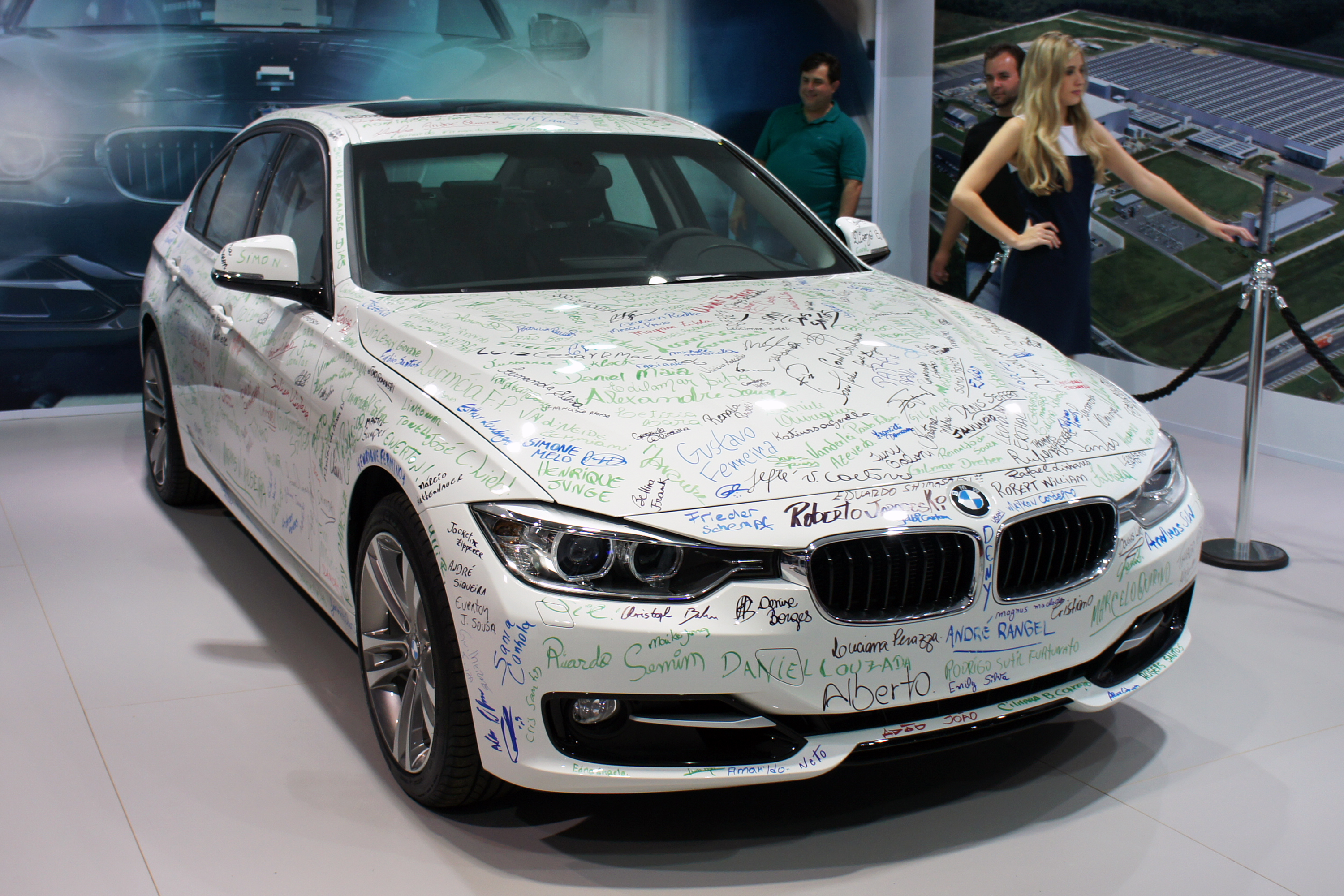
The first BMW manufactured at the Araquari plant

The town is home of a BMW automobile plant since October 2014, when the first BMW 328i ActiveFlex car was assembled. Over the course of the next few years, more than EUR 200 million was invested in the plant, resulting in a production capacity of more than 30,000 vehicles annually. The BMW 328i ActiveFlex car is a flex fuel version of BMW 3 series specifically designed for the Brazilian market, which allows the vehicle to run on any blend of gasoline and ethanol up to E100 ethanol. BMW produces the 3 Series, X1, X3, X4 and X5 plug-in hybrid PHEV electrified, same as of what is manufactured in Spartanburg, South Carolina.

== See also ==
- List of municipalities in Santa Catarina
