= Joinville =

Municipality in Santa Catarina, Brazil

Coordinates: 26.3204°S 48.8437°W

- Municipality
- Municipality of Joinville
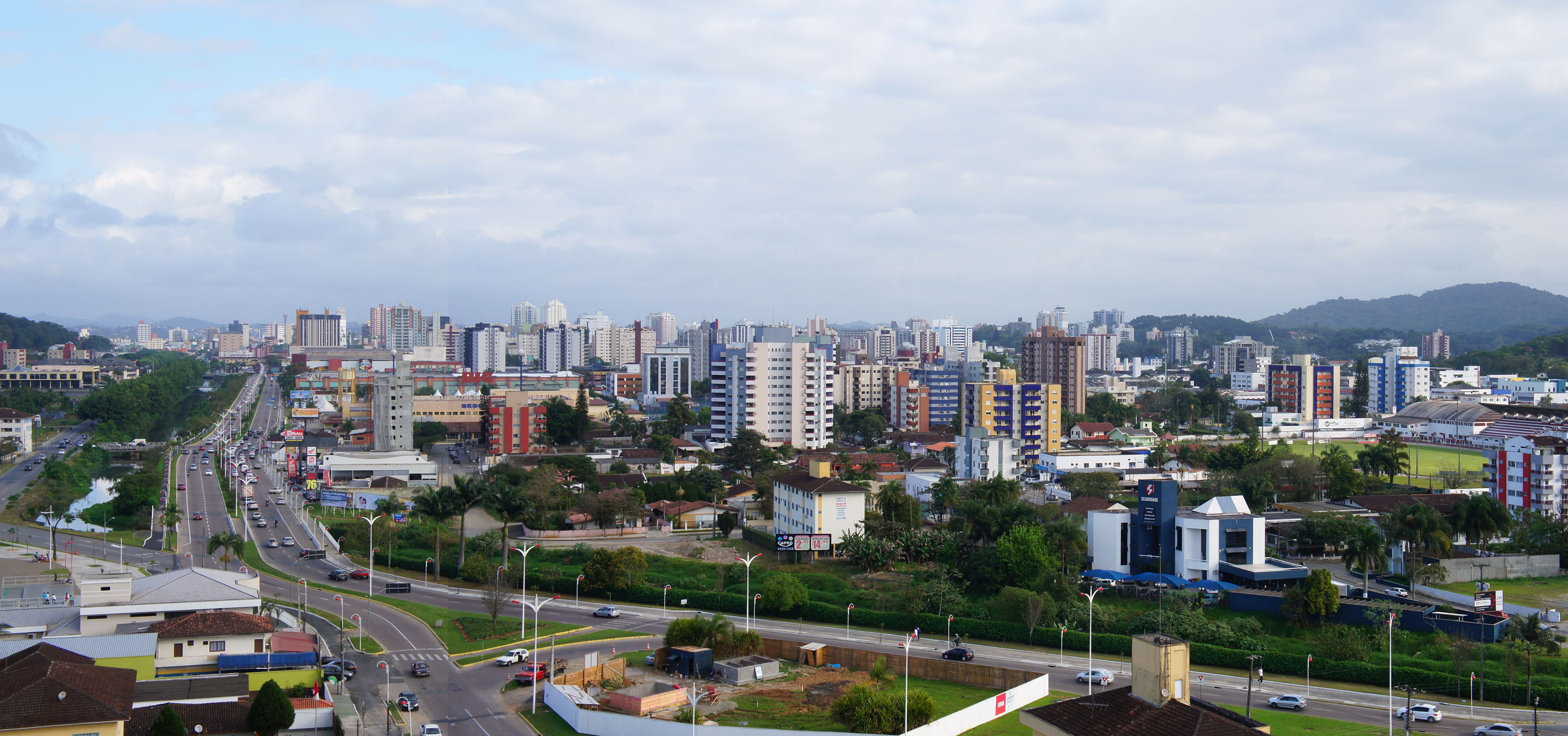
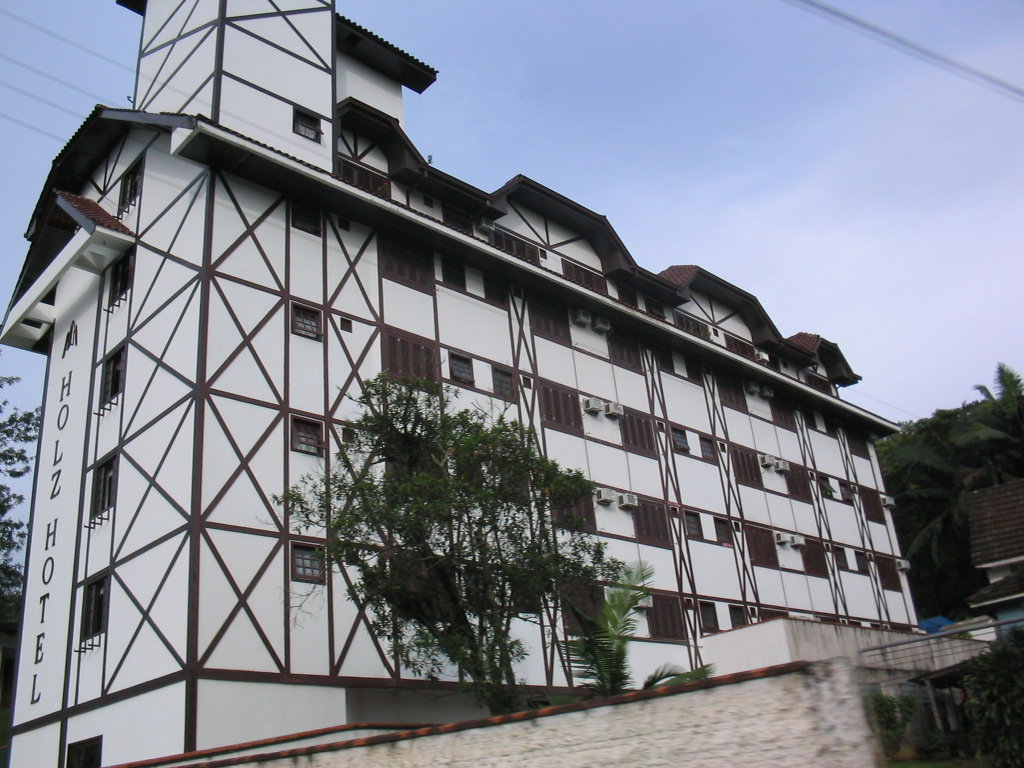
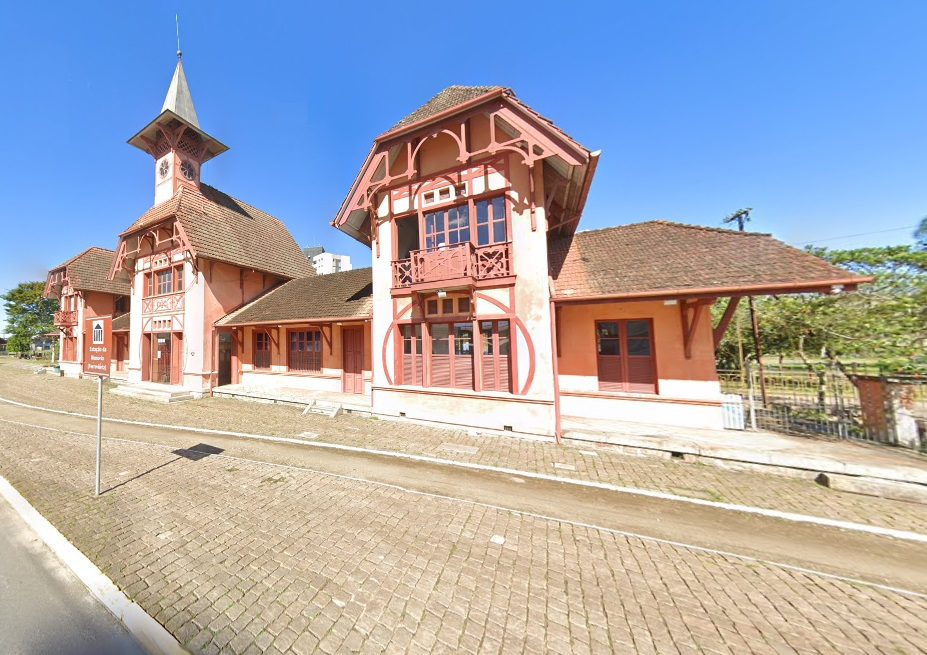
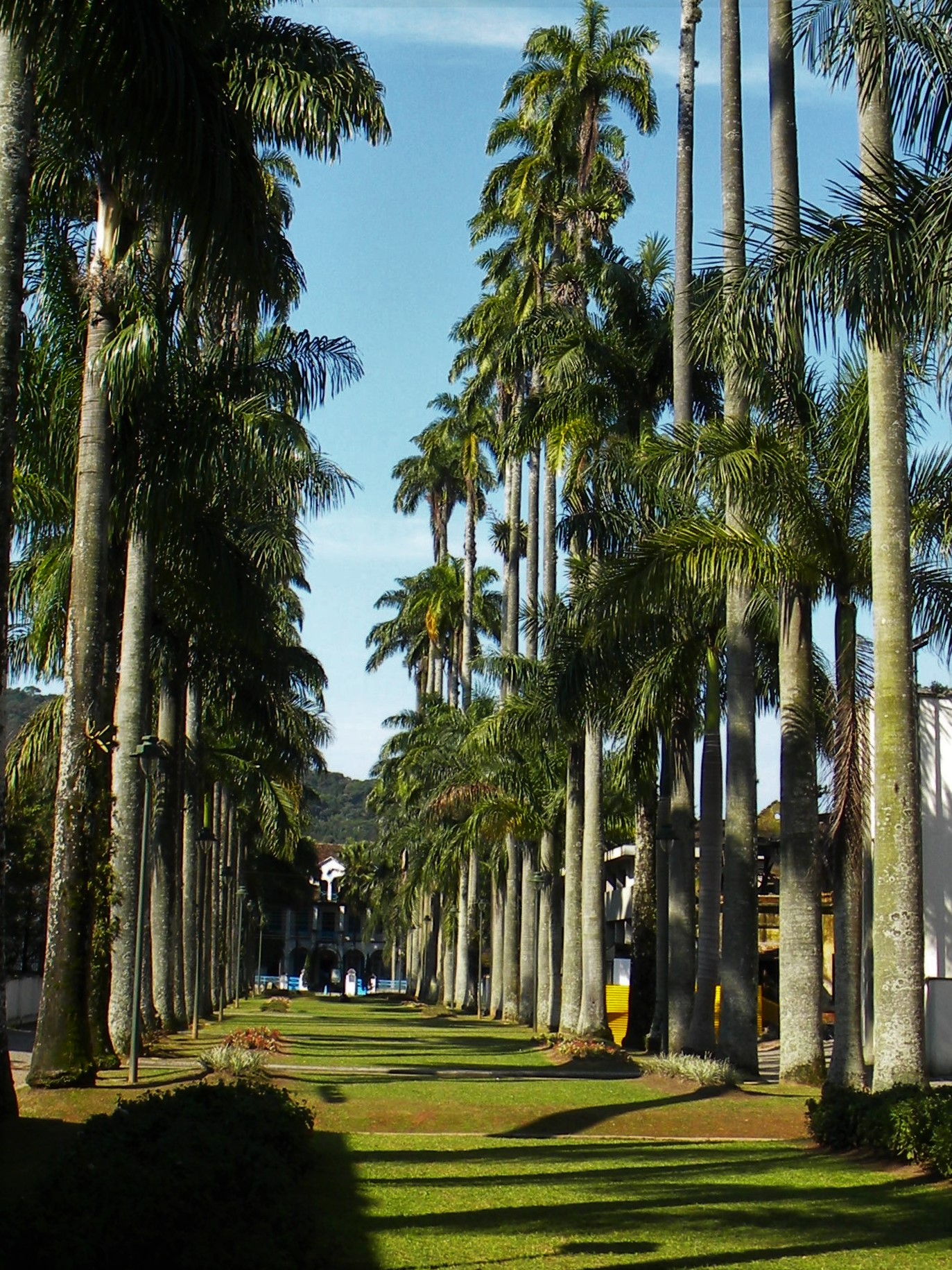
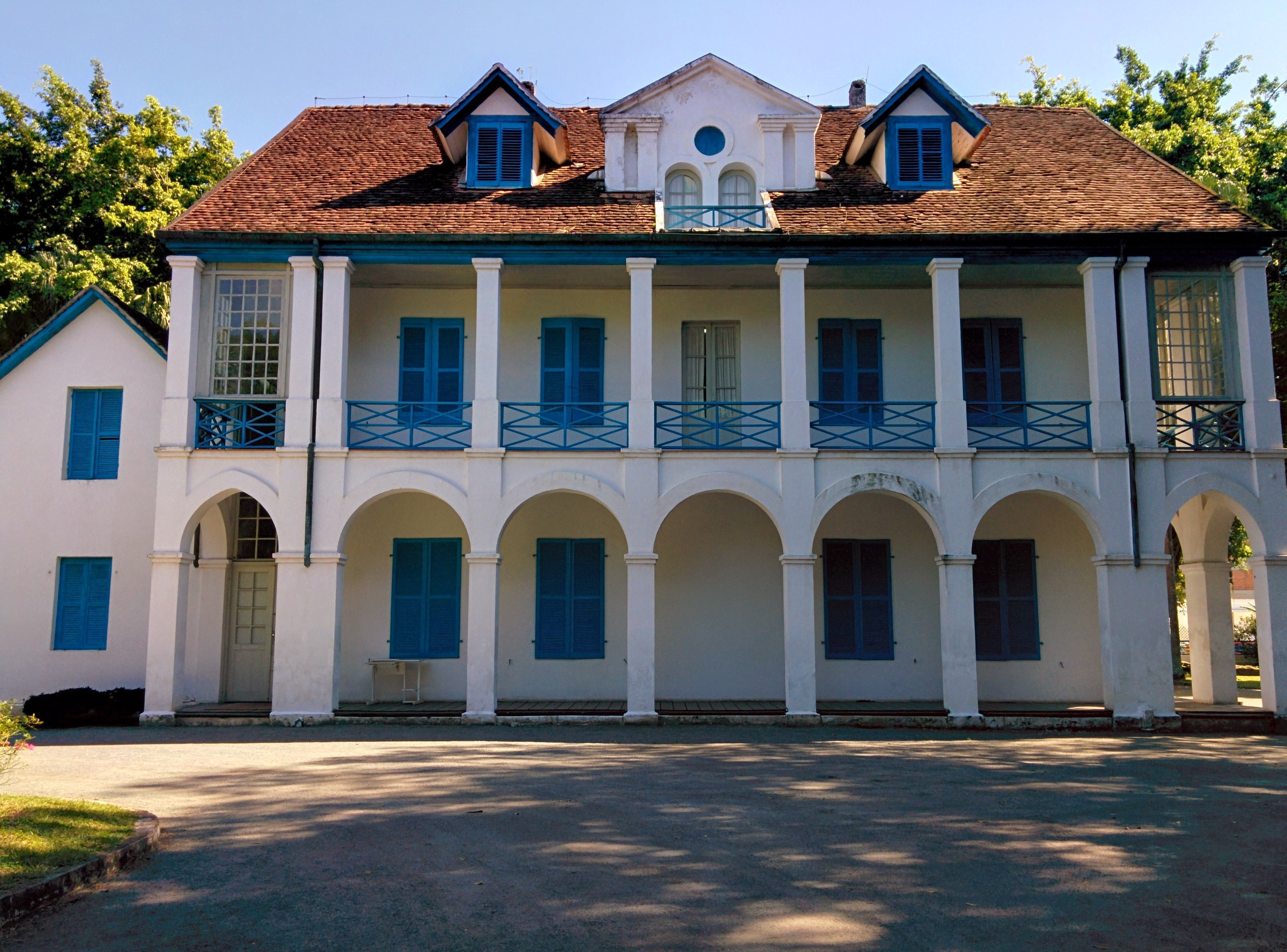
- From the top, clockwise: skyline of downtown Joinville, Memory Station, the National Museum of Immigration and Colonization, Rua das Palmeiras, and Holz Hotel

- Flag Coat of arms
- Nicknames: City of Princes, City of Flowers, Brazilian Manchester
- Motto: Mea Autem Brasiliæ Magnitudo "My greatness is identical to that of Brazil"
- Location of Joinville
- Country: Brazil
- Region: South
- State: Santa Catarina
- Mesoregion: Norte Catarinense
- Microregion: Joinville
- Founded: 9 March 1851
- Named for: François d'Orléans, Prince of Joinville

Government
  - Mayor: Adriano Silva (2021–2028) (NOVO)

Area
  - Total: 1,131 km^{2} (437 sq mi)
- Elevation: 4 m (13 ft)

Population (2025)
  - Total: 664,500
  - Density: 587.5/km^{2} (1,522/sq mi)
- Time zone: UTC-3 (UTC-3)
- Postal Code: 89200-000
- Area code: +55 47
- HDI (2010): 0.809 – very high
- Website: joinville.sc.gov.br

Joinville (Portuguese pronunciation: [ˌʒoĩˈvili]) is the largest city in Santa Catarina, in southern Brazil. It is the third largest municipality in the southern region of Brazil, after the much larger state capitals of Curitiba and Porto Alegre. Joinville is also a major industrial, financial and commerce center.

The city has a very high human development index (0.809) among Brazilian municipalities, being 21st nationally, and has one of the highest standards of living in Latin America. One study pointed to Joinville as the second best city to live in Brazil.

In 2020, the population of Joinville was estimated at 597,658 people, many of whom are of Portuguese, Polish, Austrian, German, Swiss, Czech, and Italian descent. The metropolitan area is home to 1,340,997 residents according to the 2010 census by IBGE, making it the most populous metropolitan region of the state of Santa Catarina.

Owing to urban development and relatively good infrastructure, Joinville has become a major center for events and business conferences. The city is also the seat of the Roman Catholic Archdiocese of Joinville.

== History ==
Historical affiliations

Empire of Brazil 1851–1889
Republic of Brazil 1889–present

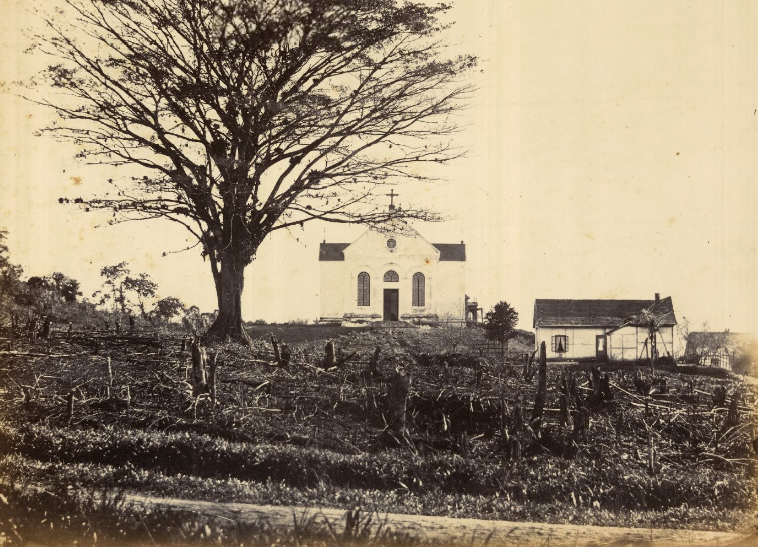
Dona Francisca (1886). German colony in Joinville during the reign of Emperor Pedro II of Brazil

The area surrounding Joinville had been inhabited by the Guarani people for approximately 7,000 years.

From 1851 to 1888, the city of Joinville received 17,000 German immigrants.

=== Founding ===
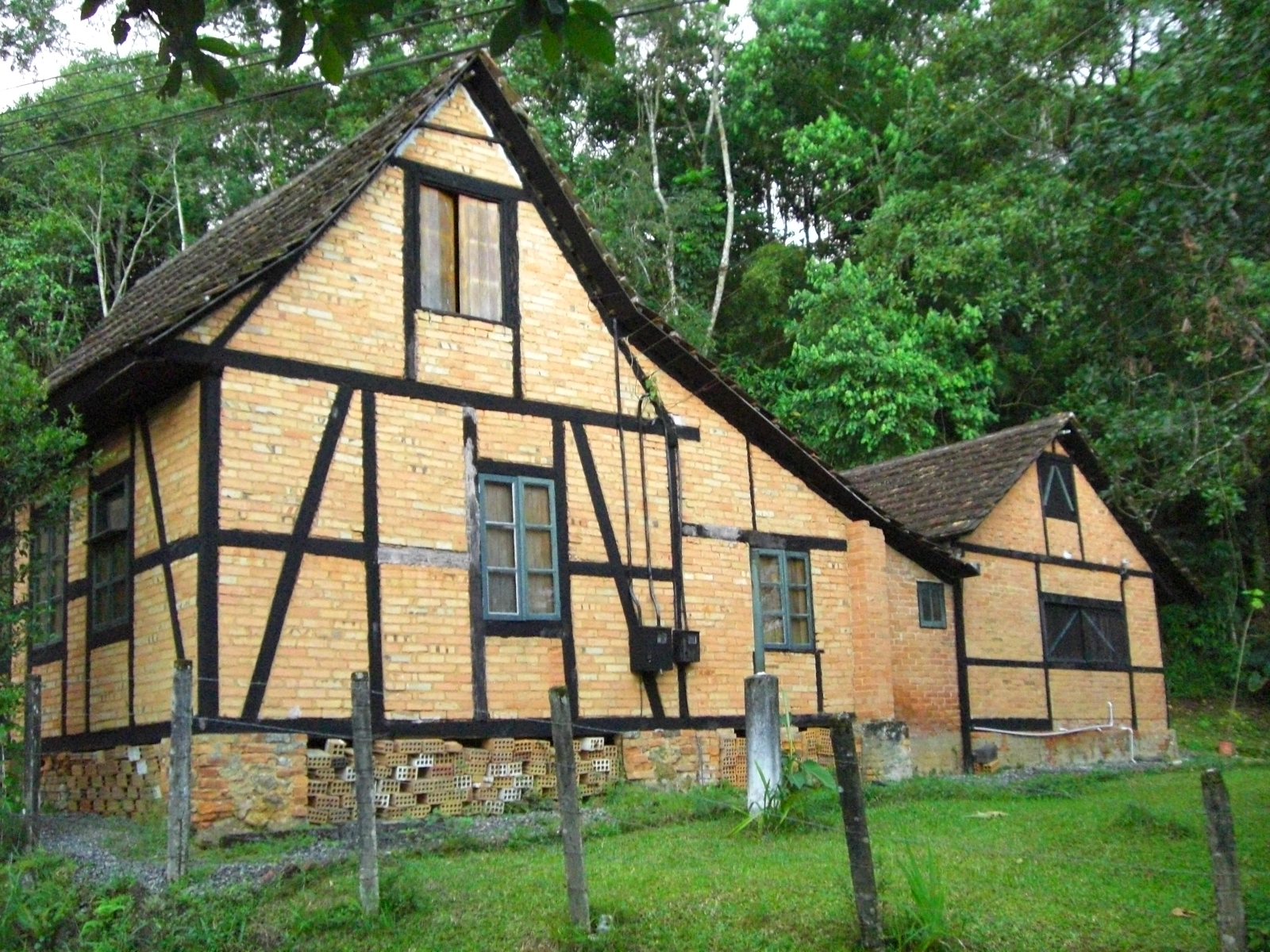
The half-timbered house is an inheritance of the Germanic colonization.

The city of Joinville was founded by German, Norwegian, Swiss settlers on 9 March 1851. Immigrants from Norway made up a group of men with several professional qualifications, including carpenters, masons, bakers, agriculturalists, and even a veterinarian and physician. Many of the first Norwegian settlers became ill by dysentery, typhoid, and other illnesses. In the first letter home, dated to July 1851, the author explained that "only" four Norwegians were dead so far: Simon Hansen of Helgeland, Lars C. Steensem of Ytterøy, Hans Petter Luttersen of Horten, and Martin Nordby of Larvik. Between 1851 and 1852, 41 Norwegians left Joinville and seven died.

A monument was erected by Rio Cachoeira in the city centre in 2001, in honor of the Norwegian, Swiss, and German settlers.

== Geography ==
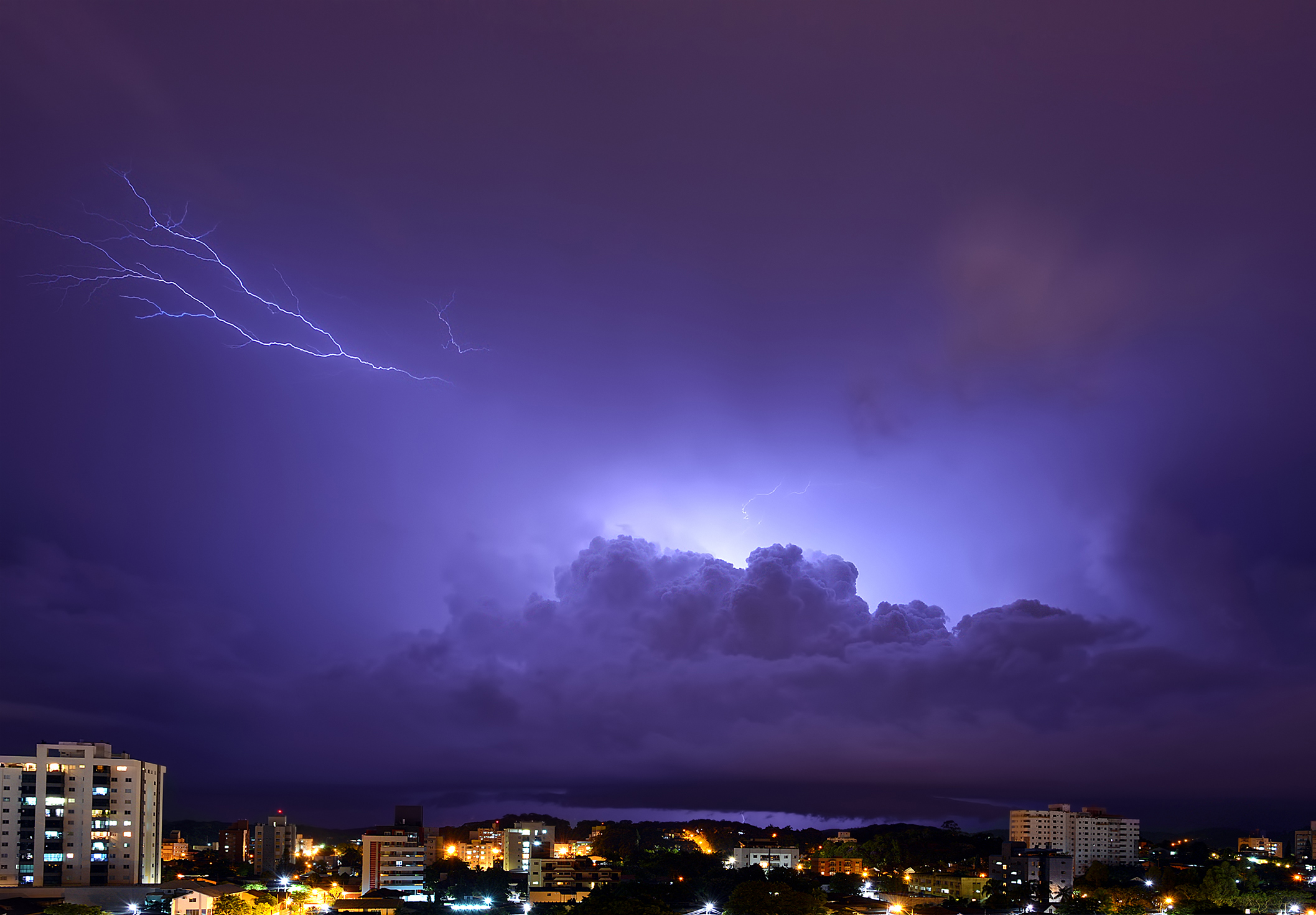
A storm over Joinville

Joinville is located in the northeast of the state of Santa Catarina, close to the Atlantic coast, and is crossed by the river Cachoeira. It is not far from the border with the state of Paraná and its capital, Curitiba. The city is surrounded by the municipalities of Garuva, São Francisco do Sul, Araquari, Guaramirim, Schroeder, Jaraguá do Sul and Campo Alegre (this one in the microregion of São Bento do Sul).

The city contains a port on Babitonga Bay, which leads to the Atlantic Ocean and provides an important route for exporting manufactured products. In 2006–07 there were public discussions about creating a Baía da Babitonga Wildlife Reserve to manage the mangroves, fishery and aquaculture in the bay. This was defeated by politicians and businesspeople who were concerned about the impact on planned projects including a port expansion.

=== Climate ===
Joinville has a humid subtropical climate (Cfa in the Köppen climate classification data). In some rare cases, Joinville gets hit by South Atlantic cyclones, the most notable being Cyclone Catarina in 2004. Although Joinville lies outside the tropic zone, because of its low altitude and proximity to the Atlantic Ocean, it sees relatively little temperature variation throughout the year, with every month seeing average highs above 20 °C (68 °F).

Climate data for Joinville (Univille) (1976–2005)
Month	Jan	Feb	Mar	Apr	May	Jun	Jul	Aug	Sep	Oct	Nov	Dec	Year
Mean daily maximum °C (°F)	29.8 (85.6)	29.8 (85.6)	28.2 (82.8)	27.7 (81.9)	25.2 (77.4)	22.5 (72.5)	21.6 (70.9)	22.6 (72.7)	22.5 (72.5)	24.4 (75.9)	26.6 (79.9)	29.9 (85.8)	25.9 (78.6)
Mean daily minimum °C (°F)	21.4 (70.5)	20.5 (68.9)	19.8 (67.6)	18.5 (65.3)	16.1 (61.0)	13.6 (56.5)	12.9 (55.2)	13.5 (56.3)	15.3 (59.5)	17.0 (62.6)	18.6 (65.5)	20.2 (68.4)	17.3 (63.1)
Average precipitation mm (inches)	258.0 (10.16)	234.0 (9.21)	216.0 (8.50)	122.1 (4.81)	111.3 (4.38)	98.6 (3.88)	107.7 (4.24)	98.0 (3.86)	137.0 (5.39)	173.4 (6.83)	159.0 (6.26)	208.0 (8.19)	1,923.1 (75.71)
Average relative humidity (%)	84	85	87	84	85	85	88	88	88	87	87	84	86
Source: Empresa Brasileira de Pesquisa Agropecuária (EMBRAPA)

=== Neighbourhoods ===
- Adhemar Garcia
- América
- Anita Garibaldi
- Atiradores
- Aventureiro
- Boa Vista
- Boehmerwald
- Bom Retiro
- Bucarein
- Centro
- Comasa
- Costa e Silva
- Dona Francisca
- Espinheiros
- Fátima
- Floresta
- Glória
- Guanabara
- Iririú
- Itaum
- Itinga
- Itoupava Açu
- Jardim Iririú
- Jardim Paraíso
- Jardim Sophia
- Jarivatuba
- João Costa
- Morro do Meio
- Nova Brasília
- Paranaguamirim
- Parque Guarani
- Petrópolis
- Pirabeiraba-centro
- Rio Bonito
- Rio Velho
- Saguaçu
- Santa Catarina
- Santo Antônio
- São Marcos
- Vila Cubatão
- Vila Nova
- Zona Industrial Norte
- Zona Industrial Tupy

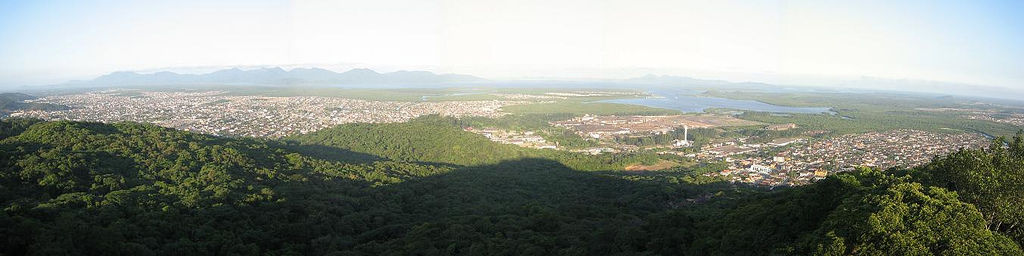
Joinville suburbs view.

== Culture ==
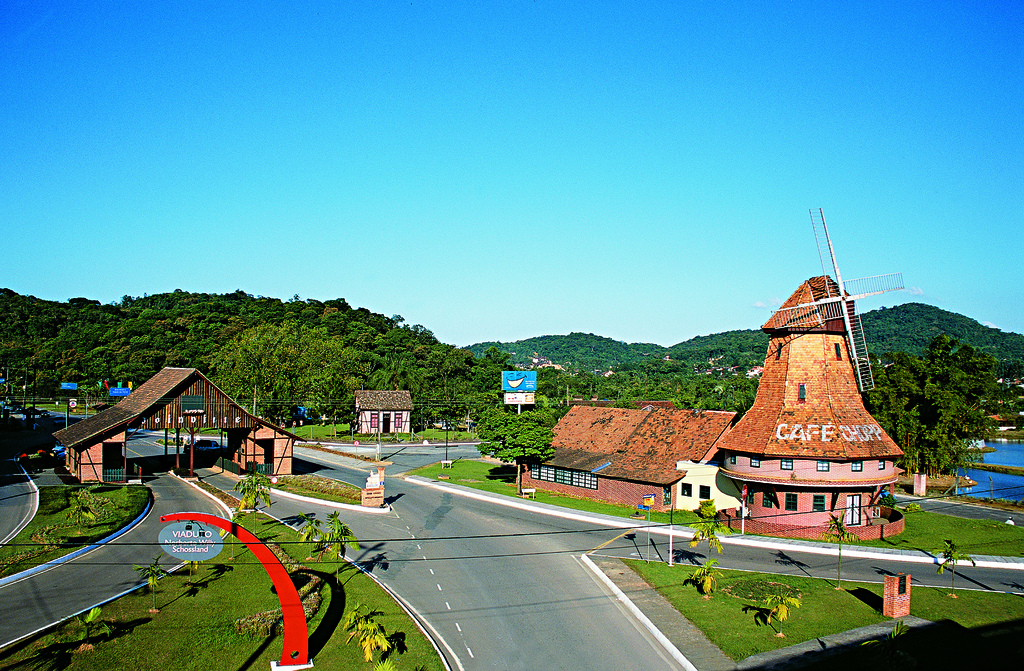
Germanic-style buildings at the city main entrance.

Joinville is the host city of the Festival de Dança de Joinville (Joinville Dance Festival) which is the world's largest dance event, held every year during the month of July. Joinville is the only city outside of Moscow to have a school of the Bolshoi Ballet, the renowned Russian Ballet Company. The city is home to a Catholic bishop, several Lutheran churches (one of the largest communities in Brazil), a Botanical Garden and a Zoo. Parks, and several beaches are less than an hour's drive away from the city. Joinville is also home to several museums including the "MUBI" bicycle museum.

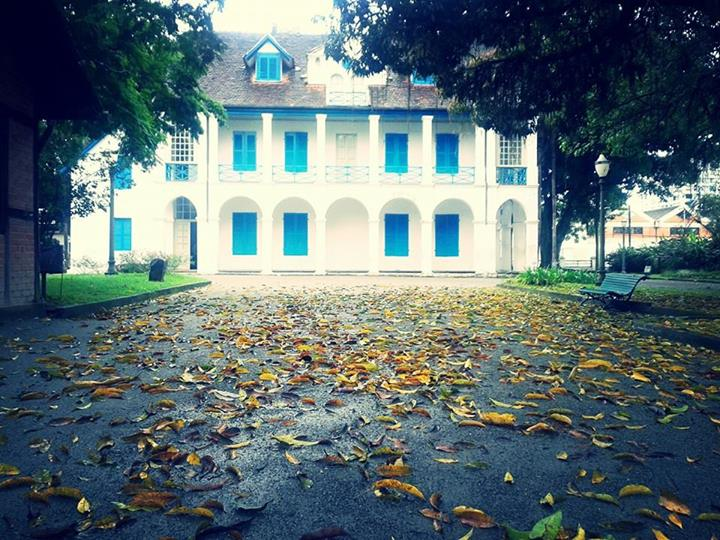
The National Museum of Immigration and Colonization.

== Demographics ==
European Brazilians compose most of the city's population, tracing their origins mostly from Southern and Central Europe. A minority of the population (23.6%) are Black or Pardo (Brown-colored multiracials).

Race/Skin color	Percentage	Number
White	76.0%	468,401
Mixed	19.5%	120,284
Black	4.1%	25,532
Asian	0.3%	1,599
Amerindian	0.1%	463

Source: 2022 census.

== Religion ==
Religion	Percentage	Number
Roman Catholics	73.26%	314,729
Protestants	22.49%	96,632
No religion	2.01%	8,656

Source: IBGE 2000.

== Education ==
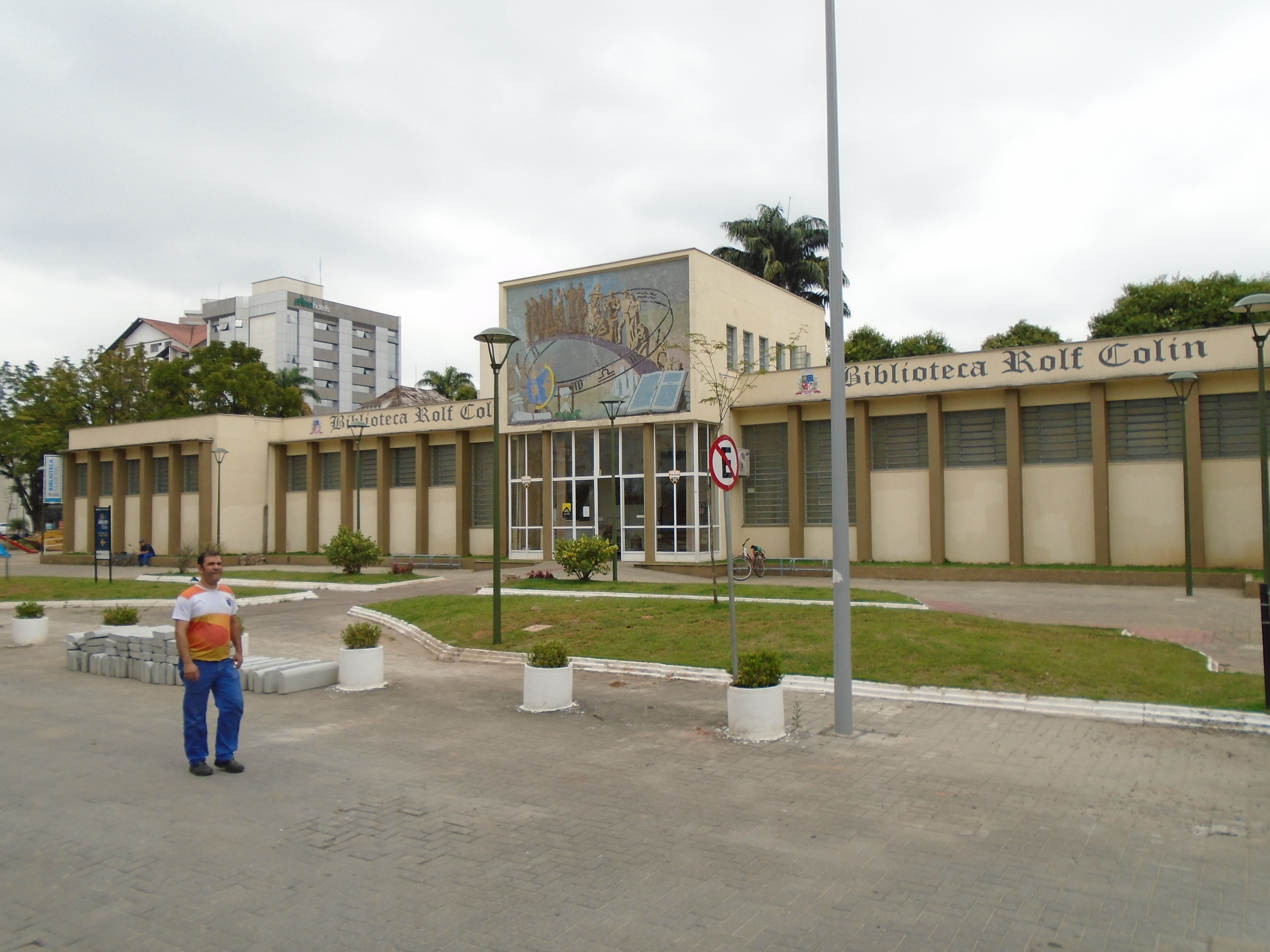
Rolf Colin public library.

English and Spanish are part of the official high school curriculum. As most of Joinville's inhabitants are of German ancestry, the German language is also taught in some schools.

=== State and Federal ===
- Federal University of Santa Catarina
- Federal Institute of Santa Catarina
- Universidade do Estado de Santa Catarina

== Transportation ==
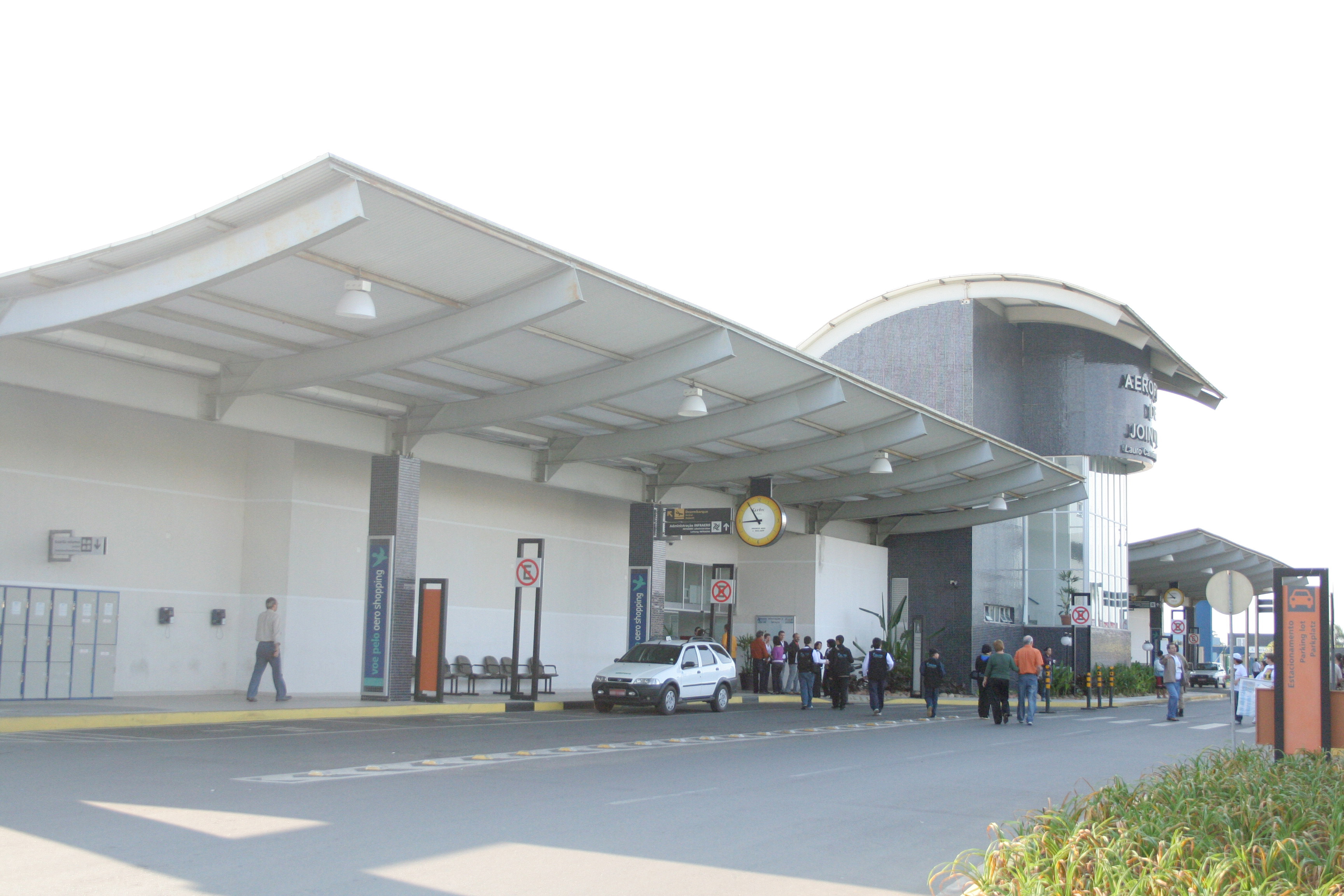
Joinville Airport.

=== Domestic airport ===
Joinville-Lauro Carneiro de Loyola Airport (IATA code: JOI) is a minor airport in southern Brazil and serves only domestic flights. It is 13 km (8.1 mi) from downtown.

=== Buses ===
The city is served by Harold Nielson Bus Station.

== Football ==
- Joinville Esporte Clube is a local football club.

== Notable people ==
- Alexandr Fier, chess grandmaster
- Eduardo Fischer, swimmer
- Jovani Furlan, ballet dancer
- Luma Grothe, fashion model
- Maurício Gugelmin, racecar driver
- Luana Lopes Lara, co-founder of Kalshi
- Juarez Machado, painter
- Ana Lúcia Martins, politician
- Ana Cláudia Michels, fashion model
- Vitor Miranda, martial artist
- Márcia Narloch, marathon runner
- Daniel Orzechowski, swimmer
- Gabriel Sara, footballer
- Adriano Silva, politician
- Tiago Splitter, basketball player

== See also ==
- Kolonie-Zeitung, first newspaper printed in Joinville (in German)
