= Schroeder, Santa Catarina =

Schroeder
- Municipality
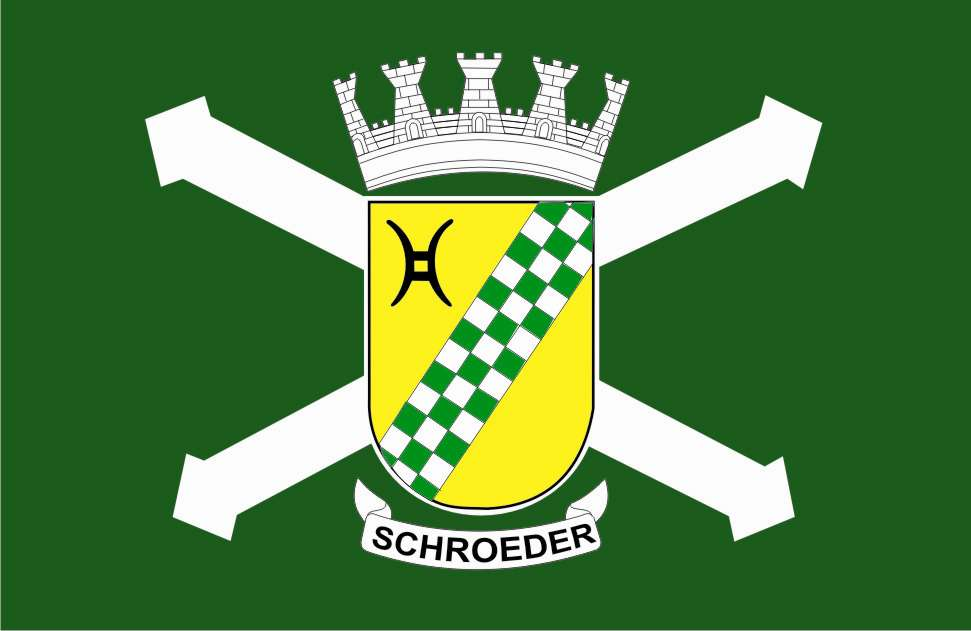
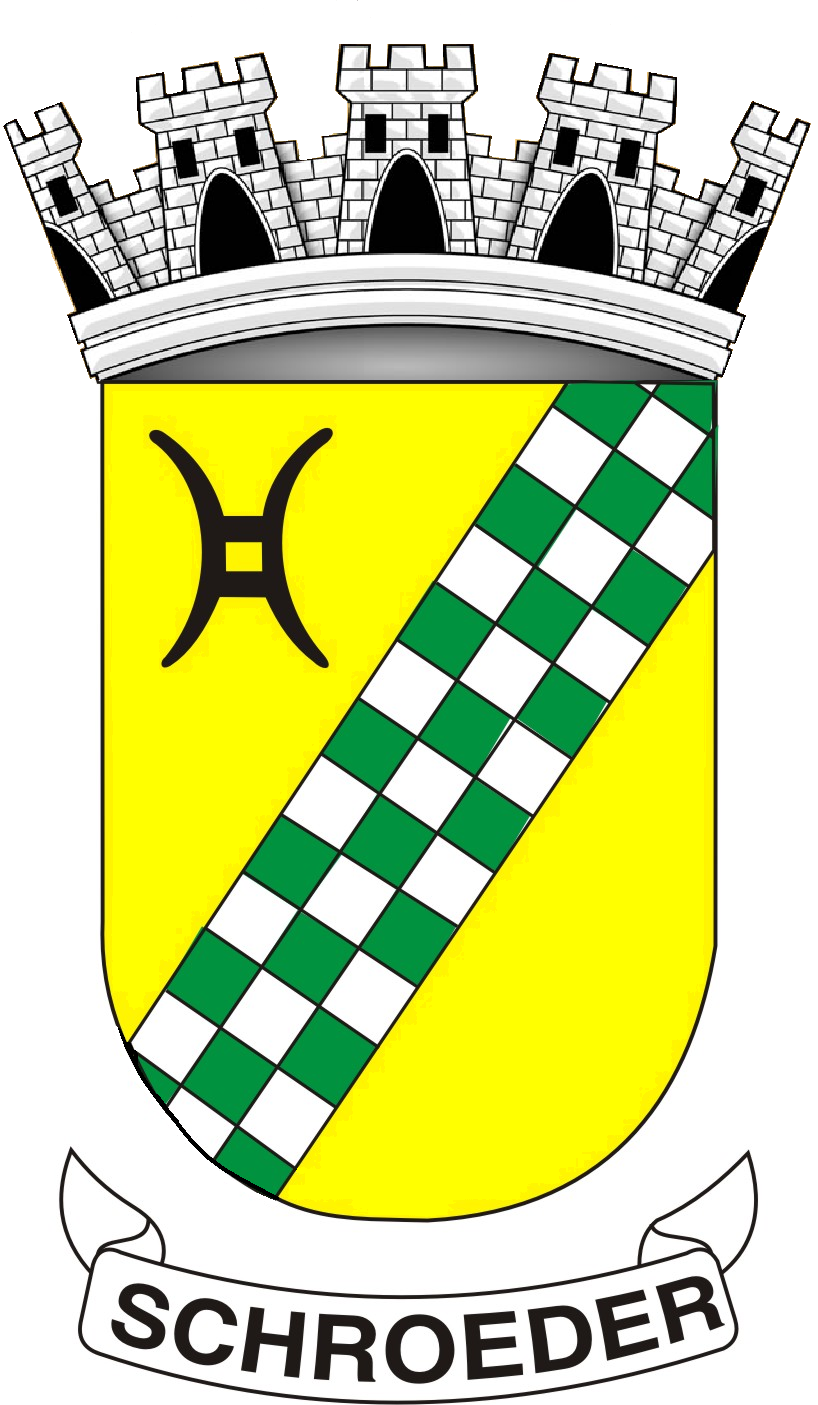
- Flag Coat of arms

- Location in Brazil
- Coordinates: 26°24′26″S 49°4′22″W
- Country: Brazil
- Region: South
- State: Santa Catarina
- Mesoregion: Norte Catarinense

Government
  - Mayor: Felipe Voigt

Area
  - Total: 143.57 km^{2} (55.43 sq mi)
- Elevation: 38 m (125 ft)

Population (2020)
  - Total: 21,991
  - Density: 153.17/km^{2} (396.72/sq mi)
- Demonym: Schroedense
- Time zone: UTC -3
- Area code: +55 47

Schroeder (Schröder) is a municipality in the state of Santa Catarina in the South region of Brazil.

It was named after Christian Mathias Schröder, a German senator who organized a colony in the area.

== History ==
The origin of the municipality's name stems from senator Christian Mathias Schröder, born in the city of Hamburg, located in the north of Germany. Schroeder is also informally known by the name of Schroeder Straße, mainly by the older portion of the population that still speak German. The majority of the town's inhabitants are descendants from Germans originating in the northern region. The presence of other ethnic groups, mainly the Italians, also contributed to the city's history.

The history of the municipality begun with the marriage of Princess Francisca Carolina Joana Leopoldina Romana Xavier de Paula Micaela Rafaela Gabriela Gonzaga de Bragança (1824-1898) and Prince François Ferdinand Philippe Louis Marie d'Orléans (1818-1900). In the 1st of may of 1843, the princess Francisca Carolina, daughter of Pedro I of Brazil, married the prince of Joinville, François Ferdinand, son of the king of the French Louis Philippe, and received as a wedding dowry a nearby stretch of land, the colony of São Francisco, area which would be split up into several municipalities along the posterior century, including the town of São Francisco do Sul. In 1846 the engineer Jerônimo Coelho traveled to the area to make the demarcation of the lands.

In 1848, the king of the French Louis Philippe was dethroned and his son François took refuge in England. After beginning to suffer from financial struggles, he sold part of the land to the owner of the Hamburgian Colonizer Society (Sociedade Colonizadora Hamburguesa), the German senator Christian Mathias Schroeder, eight of the 25 leagues received as a dowry. The senator then launched a settling project in part of the received land. Part of the colonists acquired lands near the area where the Schroeder I neighbourhood would be established, beginning the colonization of the lands that today make up the city of Schroeder.

With the increase in population, Schroeder was created as a Guaramirense district by law nº 424 of 31st of July of 1959 of Guaramirim, with Sir Helmuth Moritz Germano Hertel appointed to the role of district intendant. The district would only be promoted into the status of municipality in October 3rd of 1964, through a decree signed by governor Celso Ramos. Sir Paulo Roberto Geipnel was named as the provisional mayor and stayed in the role until November 14th of 1965, when the first elected mayor, Sir Ludgero Tepasse, elected in the 3rd of October of the same year, would take over.

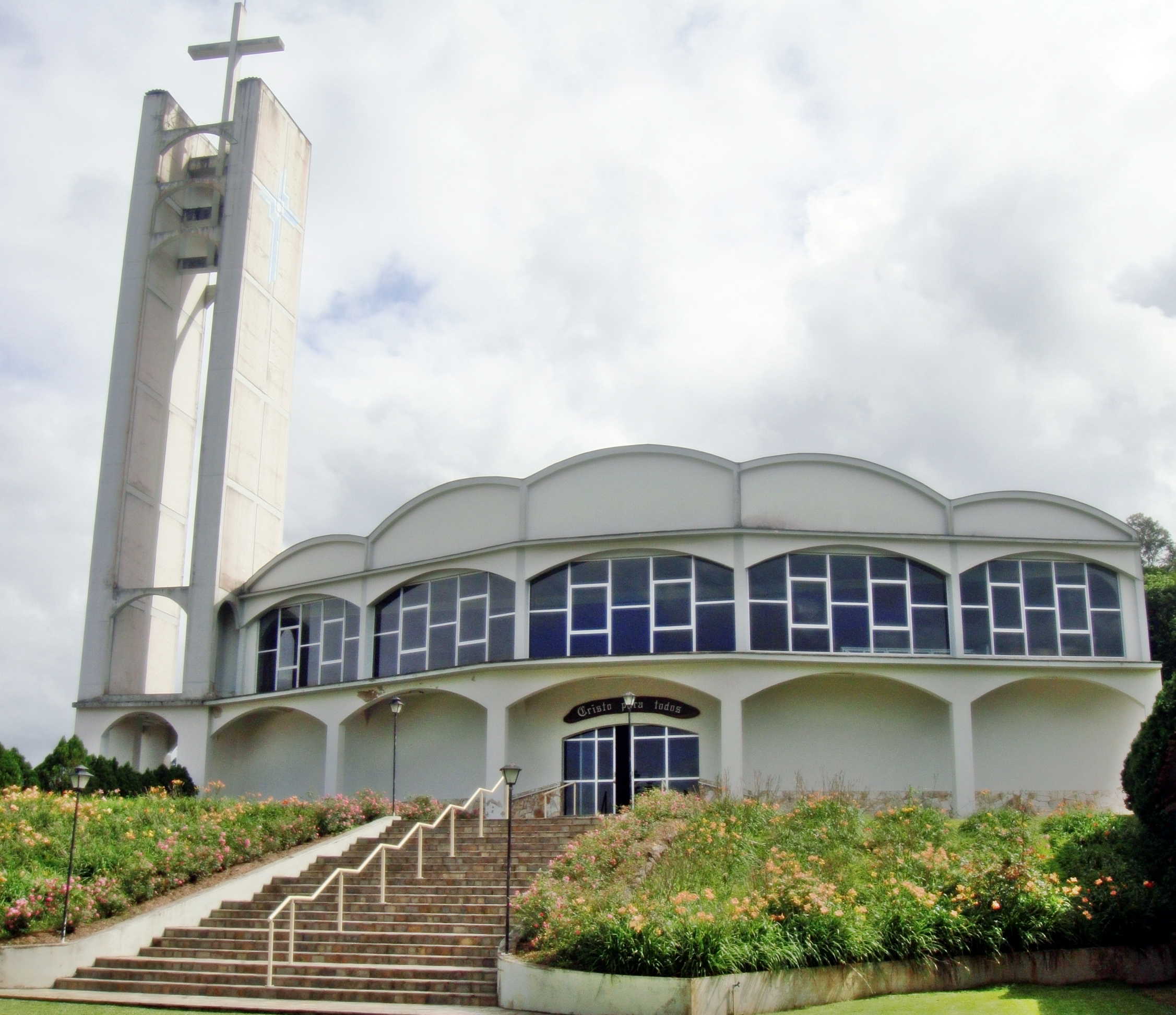
Evangelical church in Schroeder

== See also ==
- List of municipalities in Santa Catarina
