= Christian Mathias Schröder =

German politician

Christian M. Schröder
- Born: Christian Mathias Schröder; 27 January 1778
- Died: 25 January 1860 (aged 81)
- Occupation: Senator
- Known for: Member of the Society for the Protection of the Immigrant in Southern Brazil

Christian Mathias Schröder (also Schroeder; 27 January 1778 – 25 January 1860) was a German senator from the city of Hamburg, Germany.

== Biography ==
Schröder made history as the main member and stock holder of the "Society for the Protection of the Immigrant in Southern Brazil" (in Portuguese: "Sociedade de Proteção ao Imigrantes no sul do Brasil") which was established in 1842. Because of such activities, his name has become permanently linked to the history of the state of Santa Catarina, Brazil.

Among other financial colonization activities, Schröder sent his son Eduard Schröder to become the first manager of the Dona Francisca colony (today city of Joinville). After a period of time as the administrator of the colony his son returned to his native land permanently.

Schröder was a Lutheran and a speaker of Low German, a minority language which also became part of southern Brazil's regional linguistic tradition. Low German, like many other Brazilian minority languages (such as Riograndenser Hunsrückisch, Talian (Italian) and Japanese), is still spoken by some in the old colonial zones. However, like most minority languages throughout the country, it too is facing a fast decline and imminent extinction.

== Legacy ==
The municipality of Schroeder, a town located near Joinville, got its name from Schröder.
