= Darci (footballer, born 1979) =

Brazilian footballer

Personal information
- Full name: Darci Afonso Jacobi Júnior
- Date of birth: 29 June 1979 (age 47)
- Place of birth: Guaramirim, Brazil
- Height: 1.89 m (6 ft 2 in)
- Position: Goalkeeper

Youth career
- Paraná

Senior career*
Years	Team	Apps	(Gls)
2000–2007	Paraná		
2001	→ Grêmio Maringá (loan)		
2006	→ Bahia (loan)	32	(0)
2007	→ Goytacaz (loan)		
2008–2009	Bahia		
2009	→ Macaé (loan)		
2010	Juventus-SC		
2010	Santa Cruz		
2011	Marília		
2011–2012	Juventus-SC		
2012	→ Ceilândia (loan)		
2013	Salgueiro		
2013	Sport Jaraguá		
2014	Votuporanguense		
2014	Caldas Novas		
2015–2016	Aparecidense		
2017	FC Cascavel		
- * Club domestic league appearances and goals as of 1 December 2023

Darci Afonso Jacobi Júnior (born 29 June 1979), simply known as Darci, is a Brazilian former professional footballer who played as a goalkeeper.

== Career ==
Darci started his career at Paraná Clube, where he was part of winning the state championship in 2006. In the second half of the year, he was loaned to Bahia and was a starter throughout the club's campaign in Série C.

In 2011, he spent 674 minutes without conceding a goal for Juventus de Jaraguá, an absolute record in the club's history.

Darci also played for Ceilândia, where he was champion of the Federal District in 2012, Salgueiro, Sports Jaraguá, Votuporanguense, Caldas Novas, Aparecidense and FC Cascavel.

== Personal life ==
Darci is brother of the also goalkeeper Júlio César.

== Honours ==
Paraná

- Campeonato Paranaense: 2006

Ceilândia

- Campeonato Brasiliense: 2012
