= Cachoeiras =

Cachoeiras (Portuguese pronunciation: [kɐˈʃwɐjɾɐʃ]) (a plural form of the Portuguese meaning waterfall) may refer to several places:

- Cachoeiras, Niteroi, a neighborhood of the municipality of Niterói in the state of Rio de Janeiro in Brazil
- Cachoeiras, Portugal, a parish in the municipality of Vila Franca do Xira
- Cachoeiras de Macacu municipality, Rio de Janeiro state, Brazil

== See also ==
- Cachoeira (disambiguation)
