= Vila Nova, Joinville, Santa Catarina =

Neighborhood in Brazil

Vila Nova is a neighborhood located in the west of the city Joinville, Santa Catarina (state), Brazil. It is famous because of the plantations of rice.
