= Cachoeira River =

There are several rivers named Cachoeira River in Brazil:

- Cachoeira Grande River, Bahia
- Cachoeira River (Bahia)
- Cachoeira River (Paraná)
- Cachoeira River (Potinga River tributary), Paraná
- Cachoeira River (Joinville), Santa Catarina
- Cachoeira River (Timbó River tributary), Santa Catarina
- Cachoeira River (São Paulo)
