= Júlio César (footballer, born 1986) =

Brazilian footballer

Personal information
- Full name: Júlio César Jacobi
- Date of birth: 2 September 1986 (age 40)
- Place of birth: Guaramirim, Brazil
- Height: 1.91 m (6 ft 3 in)
- Position: Goalkeeper

Team information
- Current team: Camboriú

Youth career
- 2003–2004: J. Malucelli
- 2005: Paraná

Senior career*
Years	Team	Apps	(Gls)
2006–2007	Botafogo	37	(0)
2008–2009	Belenenses	41	(0)
2009–2013	Benfica	4	(0)
2011–2012	→ Granada (loan)	16	(0)
2014	Getafe	5	(0)
2014–2018	Fluminense	95	(0)
2019–2021	Grêmio	14	(0)
2023	Athletic Club	6	(0)
2023–2024	CRB	1	(0)
2024–2025	Villa Nova	0	(0)
2025	Itabirito	1	(0)
2026–	Camboriú	0	(0)
- * Club domestic league appearances and goals as of 8 January 2026

Júlio César Jacobi (born 2 September 1986), known as Júlio César, is a Brazilian professional footballer who plays as a goalkeeper for Camboriú.

== Club career ==
Born in Guaramirim, Santa Catarina, Júlio César started his professional career at Botafogo de Futebol e Regatas, signing a five-year contract in August 2005. He made his Série A debut in a 0–0 home draw against Sport Club Corinthians Paulista, on 26 November 2006.

In January 2008, Júlio César moved to Portugal, joining C.F. Os Belenenses. He first played in the Primeira Liga on 23 February against C.S. Marítimo, replacing striker Weldon in the 29th minute after goalkeeper Paulo Costinha had been sent off, in an eventual 1–3 home loss.

After having played all the matches and minutes in his first full season – Belenenses was relegated, but later reinstated – he signed with Lisbon neighbours S.L. Benfica, thus reuniting with former manager Jorge Jesus. In his first year he backed up Quim, demoting José Moreira to third-choice and starting in the club's campaign in the UEFA Europa League.

On 8 April 2010, in the dying minutes of Benfica's 1–4 loss at Liverpool for the Europa League quarter-finals (and subsequent 3–5 aggregate exit), Júlio César suffered a concussion after colliding with Dirk Kuyt, having to be hospitalized. He fully recovered, appearing in a total of 14 official matches during the campaign.

On 17 August 2011, Júlio César moved to Granada CF in La Liga in a season-long move, alongside teammates Carlos Martins and Jorge Ribeiro. He made his debut for the Andalusians on 13 December in a 1–4 away defeat to Real Sociedad for the Copa del Rey, and played mostly understudy to Roberto during his spell.

On 1 September 2013, after one year limited to training, Júlio César terminated his contract with Benfica. On 10 March of the following year, after more than one year out of football, he agreed to a five-month contract with Getafe CF as an emergency signing after Miguel Ángel Moyá's serious injury.

Júlio César was signed by Fluminense FC on 9 September 2014, returning to his homeland after six years.

== Career statistics ==
=== Club ===
As of match played 25 November 2023

Appearances and goals by club, season and competition
Club	Season	League			State league		Cup (Note: Includes Taça de Portugal, Copa del Rey, Copa do Brasil, Copa da Primeira Liga)		League cup (Note: Includes Taça da Liga)		Continental		Other		Total	
Club	Season	Division	Apps	Goals	Apps	Goals	Apps	Goals	Apps	Goals	Apps	Goals	Apps	Goals	Apps	Goals
Belenenses	2007–08	Primeira Liga	11	0	—		—		—		—		—		11	0
Belenenses	2008–09	Primeira Liga	30	0	—		1	0	5	0	—		—		36	0
Belenenses	Total		41	0	—		1	0	5	0	—		—		47	0
Benfica	2009–10	Primeira Liga	0	0	—		0	0	2	0	12 (Note: Appearances in UEFA Europa League)	0	—		14	0
Benfica	2010–11	Primeira Liga	4	0	—		6	0	0	0	0	0	0	0	10	0
Benfica	2012–13	Primeira Liga	0	0	—		0	0	0	0	0	0	0	0	0	0
Benfica	Total		4	0	—		6	0	2	0	12	0	0	0	24	0
Granada (loan)	2011–12	La Liga	16	0	—		1	0	—		—		—		17	0
Getafe	2013–14	La Liga	5	0	—		—		—		—		—		5	0
Fluminense	2014	Série A	0	0	—		—		—		—		—		0	0
Fluminense	2015	Série A	2	0	0	0	2	0	—		—		—		4	0
Fluminense	2016	Série A	16	0	0	0	1	0	—		—		0	0	17	0
Fluminense	2017	Série A	22	0	7	0	5	0	—		4 (Note: Appearances in Copa Sudamericana)	0	2	0	40	0
Fluminense	2018	Série A	35	0	13	0	4	0	—		10	0	—		62	0
Fluminense	Total		75	0	20	0	12	0	—		14	0	2	0	123	0
Grêmio	2019	Série A	8	0	5	0	0	0	—		0	0	—		13	0
Grêmio	2020	Série A	1	0	0	0	0	0	—		0	0	—		1	0
Grêmio	Total		9	0	5	0	0	0	—		0	0	—		14	0
Athletic Club	2023	Série D	—		6	0	0	0	—		—		—		6	0
CRB	2023	Série B	1	0	—		0	0	—		—		—		1	0
Villa Nova	2024	Mineiro	—		0	0	—		—		—		—		0	0
Career total			151	0	31	0	20	0	7	0	26	0	2	0	237	0

== Personal life ==
Júlio César is brother of the also goalkeeper Darci.

== Honours ==
=== Club ===
Botafogo

- Campeonato Carioca: 2006
- Taça Rio: 2007, 2008

Benfica

- Taça da Liga: 2009–10
- Supertaça Cândido de Oliveira: Runner-up 2010

=== Individual ===
- Campeonato Carioca: Team of the Year 2018
