= Benny Briolly =

Brazilian politician and political activist

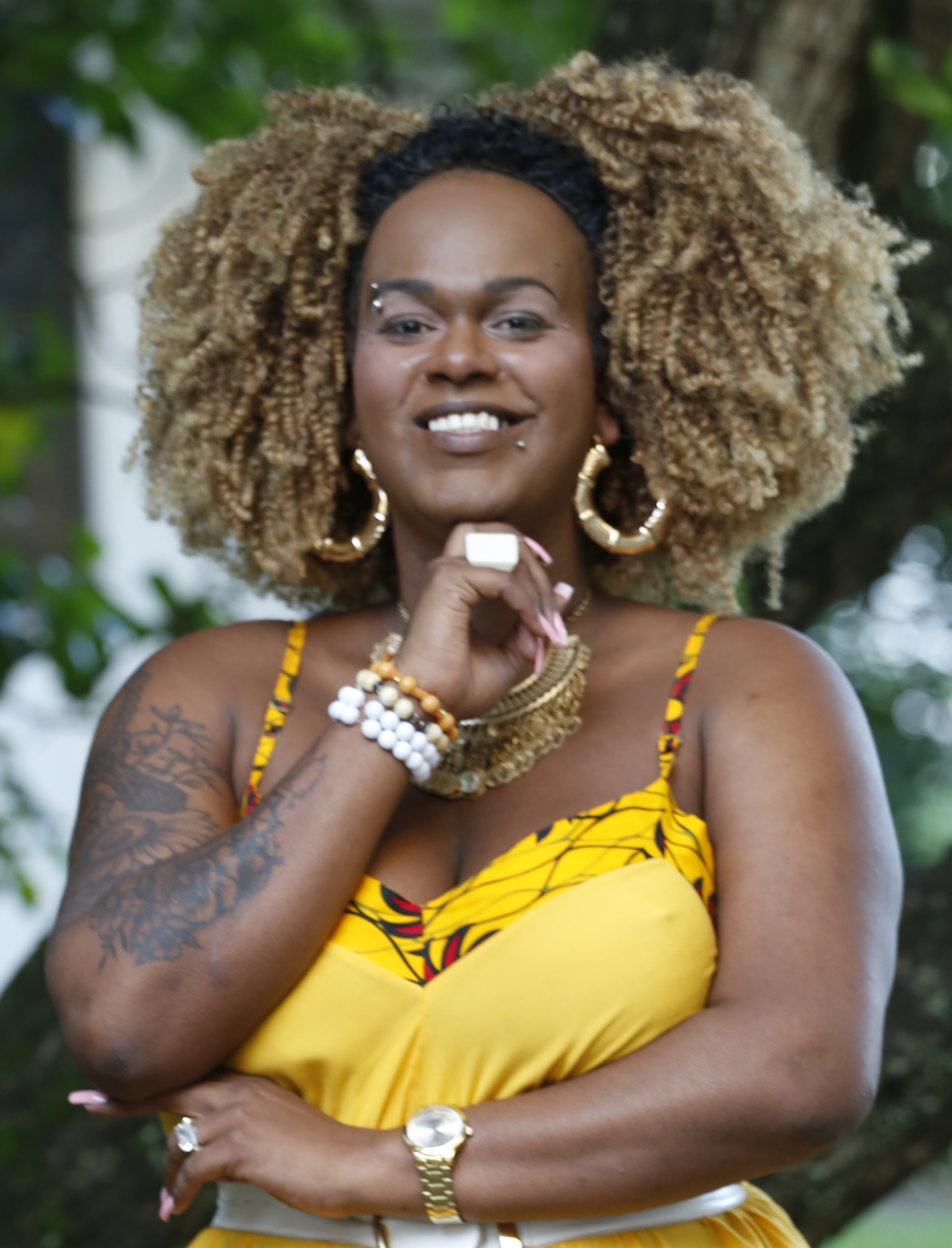

Councilwoman for Niterói
- Incumbent
- Assumed office 1 January 2021

Personal details
- Born: 29 October 1991 (age 34) Niterói, Rio de Janeiro, Brazil
- Party: PSOL

Benny Briolly (born 29 October 1991) is a Brazilian politician and political activist. In 2020, she became the first transgender councilwoman of the city of Niterói, in the state of Rio de Janeiro, being the fifth most voted for candidate for the municipal chamber that year. She is a member of the Socialism and Liberty Party (PSOL).

After she was elected, Briolly began to suffer gendered political violence and was the target of threats, which led to her leaving the country. Upon her return, she was included in the Protection Program for the Defenders of Human Rights by the Brazilian government, being the first included in the program. In July 2022, the Inter-American Commission on Human Rights recommended that the Brazilian government adopt more forceful measures to protect the councilwoman's wellbeing, as she has been a constant victim of death threats.

During the 2024 Brazilian municipal elections, she was reelected, assuming her second mandate as a councilwoman in Niterói.

== Biography ==
Briolly was born on 29 October 1991, and was born and raised in Niterói. She resided in the Favela da Palemira in the Fonseca neighborhood until she was twenty years old. She graduated with a degree in fashion and also studied journalism. As of 2020, she lives in Morro da Penha, located in the neighborhood of Ponta d'Areia.

In 2004, at 13, she began working in commerce, where she experienced racism and anti-LGBT sentiments.

Briolly began her political career in 2013, when she became a member of PSOL. In 2016, she went on to become an advisor to former councilwoman Talíria Petrone, whom Briolly met in 2009, and with whom they later participated together in the 2013 nationwide protests. At that time, she was the first transgender woman to be a parliamentary advisor at the Municipal Chamber of Niterói.

One of her main motivations to become engaged in politics was the loss of her mother when she was 15 years old. During an interview, she mentions that she became sick due to cancer, but did not receive treatment at a hospital in time. These experiences led her to question the system that they live in.

While raised in an evangelical family, Briolly is a follower of umbanda and a devotee to Maria Mulambo.

In 2023, she was crowned the rainha de bateria with the Niterói-based samba school Souza Soares. The crowning occurred on Briolly's birthday and coincided with the 60th anniversary celebrations for the school.

That same year, she took part in the LGBTQIA+ Political Leadership conference held in Mexico, while being the first transgender parliamentarian from the state of Rio de Janeiro.

== Councilwoman of Niterói ==
=== Prelude ===
Before the 2020 elections, analysts predicted that, if elected, Briolly would actively confront Douglas Gomes (PTC) in the municipal chamber, as she was considered the successor to Petrone and Gomes had been supported by Carlos Jordy. Both Petrone and Jordy were later elected federal deputies and had, beforehand, various confrontations at the municipal chamber.

=== Election and areas of work ===
Briolly was the most voted for female candidate in the Municipal Chamber Niterói, earning fifth place with a total of 4,367 votes.

One of her key proposals was the concession of a fiscal exemption for businesses that hire transgender people. She has declared that one of her principal ethos of her political career would be rights to the city, education, health, housing, and social assistance, with her main emphasis towards Black people, LGBTQ people, and women. Moreover, she seeks to promote policies that strengthen freedom of religion.

In January 2023, she took part in the Ato pela Visibilidade Trans e Travesti protest in front of the Municipal Chamber in Cinelândia.

While president of the Human Rights of Children, Adolescents, and Women Commission, Briolly recorded a request of information, in March 2023, requesting clarifications from the municipality and the Secretary of Social Assistance and Economic Solidarity as to why families in Niterói were not able to access benefits from the Moeda Arariboia program. She had already been approached by 200 families.

In July 2023, while president of the aforementioned commission, she created the Encontro de Terreiros de Umbanda, which took place at the Clube de Regatas do Gragoatá. The objective of the event was to promote debates about the role of religion in society and to combat intolerance.

In August 2023, in the context of the campaign of Agosto Lilás, Briolly organized Raízes que nos Sustentam in Niterói.

On 19 September 2023, a session of the municipal chamber had been interrupted by a group criticizing Briolly's clothes as being "very short" and incompatible with the chamber. As other council members had also not been dressed in formal wear, she interpreted this as an attempt at provocation, generating considerable debate.

== Attacks and threats ==
Since beginning her first electoral campaign in 2020, Briolly has received various death threats and suffered gendered violence. Soon after her election, she received a threatening email, whose authorship was attributed to the same sender as those who were responsible for the assassination of Marielle Franco, threatening that she would be assassinated if she were not to renounce her seat.

Due to these constant threats, Briolly left the country on 13 May 2021. On various occasions, Briolly's advisor would declare that she had suffered aggressions on the street and online, conjecturing that it had threatened her physical wellbeing. On the 18th of that month, the Public Prosecutor's Office (MPF) ordered the adoption of "urgent measures" to protect the councilwoman.

Briolly would return to Brazil on 28 May 2021, after having been included in the Protection Program for Defenders of Human Rights, in the wake of the solicitation of urgent protective measures led by the Public Electoral Prosecutor's Office, given the situation being confronted. Reporting from Fantástico revealed that the Military Police of Rio de Janeiro State refused to guarantee her safety.

Just in 2021 alone, Briolly had received 20 threats. On 23 December 2021, she received new death threats via email, being the largest amount of threats she had received in a week. On 8 March 2022, on International Women's Day, she once again received new threats with racist and transphobic themes. These threats also included the line "sleep with open eyes". In April 2023, Briolly said that, since December 2021, she received more than 30 threats, "with deeply racist and transphobic offenses".

=== Religious racism by Douglas Gomes ===
In December 2021, Briolly called out fellow councilman Douglas Gomes, who was then affiliated with the PTC, for religious racism for his actions while attending an event with children at a public school located in the Quilombo Urbano Xica Manicongo. While there, Gomes questioned if the children had been authorized by their parents to attend what he erroneously called a "terreiro".

Briolly's advisor explained that the visit consisted of an excursion with the students of the Núcleo Avançado de Educação Infantil Angela Fernandes, whose objective was the implementation of the Afro-Brazilian and Indigenous History and Culture Law, that made it obligatory to teach the history and cultures of Africa in public and private schools throughout the country. He declared even further that the children had even gone to the place to meat the artist Lia de Itamaracá, whose importance had already been discussed in the classroom.

=== Threats made by Rodrigo Amorim ===
On 20 May 2022, Briolly filled out a report with the crime board of the Delegation of Racial Crimes and Crimes of Intolerance (Decradi) for transphobia and racism against Rodrigo Amorim (PSC), who was then a state deputy in the Legislative Assembly of Rio de Janeiro (ALERJ). Three days before, Amorim had insulted Briolly in the assembly hall, referring to her as the "councilor man of", "boizebú" and a "freak of nature". In July 2022, the Public Prosecutor's Office denounced Amorim for gendered political violence due to the case, and he became the defendant in a suit in August.

In June 2022, Briolly denounced Amorim for having received threats through his email. In an official note after the publication of the threats, the deputy referred to Briolly with the masculine name "Bênio" and denied the authorship of the messages. On the 28th, the police announced that they did not find proof that the threat came from Amorim's email. In June 2023, the investigation against Briolly, initiated by Amorim, for electoral impropriety due to a video published by Briolly attributing the threats in the email to him, was concluded to be unfounded. According to the investigation, though the email was not sent by Amorim, there was no disinformation, and that the authorship of the email still had not been determined.

=== Clashes and conviction of Gomes for gendered political violence ===
In 2022, Gomes was sentenced to a year and 7 months in prison after making transphobic attacks against Briolly. Due to this, the Inter-American Commission on Human Rights charged for more effective measures by the Brazilian authorities for Briolly's protection.

In 2023, Gomes returned to become involved in discussions with Briolly, alleging that a proposed law by Briolly that sought to "provide integral healthcare to the LGBTQIA+ population" would allow for "biological men in women's restrooms at hospitals in Niterói". Gomes is known for his proposals that sought to prohibit access for transgender women to women's restrooms.

Afterwards, Gomes uploaded a video to social media where he condemns another proposal linked to LGBTQIA+ health that was supported by Briolly. There were attacks against Briolly made in the comments section, including death threats and threats of violence. Briolly, in turn, turned to the office of the Public Ministry and requesting the video be removed. She also filed a complaint with the Delegation of Racial Crimes and Crimes of Intolerance. In response, Gomes claims he is not transphobic and filed a criminal complaint against Briolly, as well as representing himself against Briolly at the Council of Ethics of the Municipal Chamber of Niterói due to threats.

=== Police escort ===
In April 2023, the Justice Ministry of the state of Rio de Janeiro determined that Briolly would have a police escort and other security measures that would "guarantee her physical integrity and the continuity of her exercise in the entire Rio de Janeiro region", complying with the request by the Public Prosecutor's Office (MPF): "The extreme measure of deployment of police escorts is justified by the history of violence against activists who are defenders of human rights."

=== Attack in Niterói ===
On 19 May 2026, during a protest in favor of transgender people using public restrooms according to their gender identity at the Plaza Shopping Niterói mall, Benny was assaulted by a man and taken to the hospital by ambulance.
