= Adriano Silva (Brazilian politician, born 1978) =

Brazilian politician (born 1978)

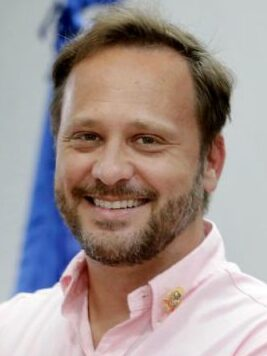

46th Mayor of Joinville
- Incumbent
- Assumed office 1 January 2021
- Vice Mayor: Rejane Gambin
- Preceded by: Udo Döhler

Personal details
- Born: 1 March 1978 (age 48) Joinville, Santa Catarina, Brazil
- Party: New (2018–present)
- Spouse: Bianca Silva
- Children: 2
- Education: Mackenzie Presbyterian University (BBA)
- Website: Official website (in Portuguese)

Adriano Bornschein Silva (born 1 March 1978) is a Brazilian businessman, politician, and volunteer firefighter. He is the current mayor of Joinville, Santa Catarina, Brazil. He is president of the Catarinense Pharma group. He is the only mayor in Brazil by the New Party and says he identifies with former President Jair Bolsonaro.

== Personal life, education, and career ==
Silva was born on 1 March 1978 in Joinville, Santa Catarina, Brazil. He is married with Bianca Silva, and they have two children, Isabela Silva and Lucas Silva. Silva is Lutheran.

He has a bachelor's degree in business administration from the Mackenzie Presbyterian University, in São Paulo.

In 2003, Silva joined Joinville's Volunteer Fire Department, where he worked in the fire brigade, and as coordinator for the children firefighters. Later, he also served as vice-president of the institution. To this day he is a volunteer, and for seventeen years he is a rescuer on call, just staying away from his functions for four months in 2020 due to his election campaign.

Silva is the great-grandson of the founder of Catarinense Pharma, a pharmaceutical company in Brazil, where he started working as a marketing assistant. Today he presides the company.

== Political career ==
Silva joined the New Party in 2018, and in the 2020 municipal election, he ran for the Joinville's mayor office for the first time. In the first round, with just 13 seconds of television air time, the second lowest air time among all the candidates, Silva received 22,98% of the valid votes, finishing in second place, behind Darci de Matos, from PSD.

On 29 November 2020, Silva won the second round of the municipal elections, with 55,43% of the valid votes.

On 1 January 2021, Silva took office as the 46th mayor of Joinville.

On 5 January 2021, five days after heavy rain damaged the city, he declared state of emergency in the city. On 8 January 2021, he reduced by 46% the readjustment of the urban cleaning tax. Silva said he understands "the beneficts that this decision brings to people".

On 12 January 2021, Silva extended the restrictive measures that were in place to prevent the spread of COVID-19, although when he still was a candidate, he opposed such measures, saying he was "against lockdown, because when the government did that, it created a severe social problem".

On 26 January 2021, Silva met with Santa Catarina governor Carlos Moisés in Florianópolis, and delivered three priority demands for the city: a request for the state government to partly support the paychecks of São José Municipal Hospital staff, a requisition to increase the monthly funds that are transferred to the Children's Hospital, and the request of financial support for the construction of a bridge connecting the city districts of Fátima and Guanabara.

Silva said one of the priorities of his administration is to approve a pension reform for the city servants (called Ipreville) still in 2021. The project has already been forwarded by the previous administration. In February 2021, the Union of Municipal Servants of Joinville (SINSEJ) started a mobilization against the pension reform intended by the Silva government. The city said it had 908 thousand reais in federal transfers of covenants blocked for not having the certificate of social security regularity (CRP). The municipality claims that without the reform, the CRP will not be renewed. SINSEJ claims that the bill cannot "be paid by the servants."
