= Lola Aronovich =

Argentinian blogger, educationist and teacher

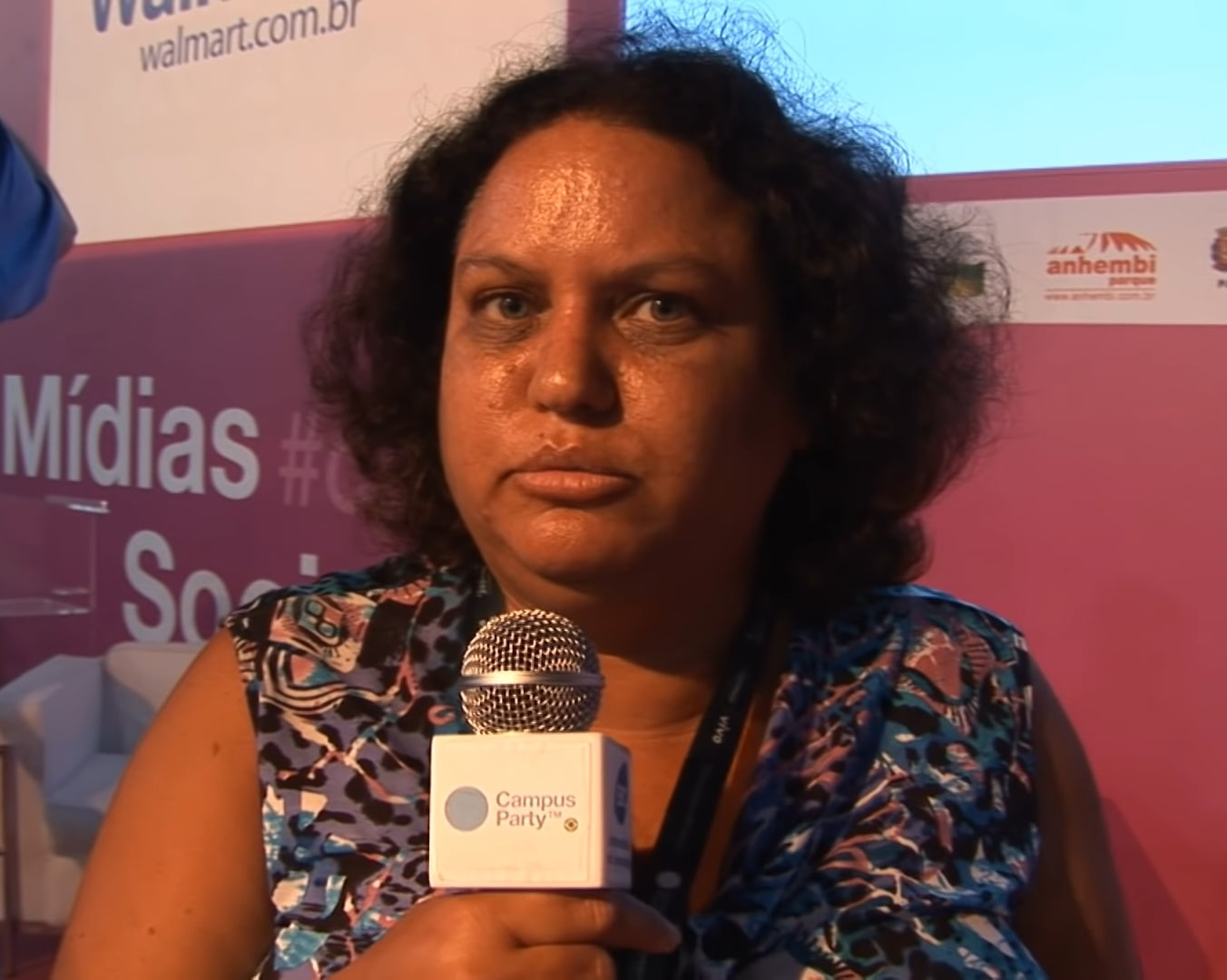
- Born: Dolores Aronovich Aguero; June 6, 1967 (age 59); Buenos Aires, Argentina
- Education: Associação Catarinense de Ensino Universidade Federal de Santa Catarina
- Occupations: professor, blogger, activist
- Website: Escreva Lola Escreva

Dolores Aronovich Aguero, better known as Lola Aronovich (born June 6, 1967, in Buenos Aires), is an Argentine-Brazilian feminist blogger and educator. She is a university professor at Federal University of Ceará (UFC) Department of Foreign Letters; her research is focused on English literature, film and gender issues

Since 2008 Aronovich publishes a blog called Escreva, Lola, Escreva (Write, Lola, Write), which deals with topics such as machismo, misogyny, homophobia, and racism. After that, she has suffered numerous cyberattacks and threats of aggression and death. Her activism and her accusations, which led to the arrest of some of the perpetrators, were honored in 2018, with the Lei Lola (Lola Act), which gave the Brazilian Federal Police responsibility for investigating misogynistic content on the Internet.

== Background and career ==
Dolores Aronovich studied advertising at the Fundação Armando Álvares Penteado (FAAP) from 1986 to 1988, not completing the course. She graduated in pedagogy from the Santa Catarina Teaching Association in 2002. She completed her specialization in letters at the University of the Joinville Region in 1998. From the Federal University of Santa Catarina, she became a master in letters in 2005, and a doctorate in 2009.

She worked for the Joinville newspaper A Notícia as a film critic and cronista from 1998 until 2008, and was also a columnist between 2007 and 2012.

She is an adjunct professor at the Universidade Federal do Ceará since 2010.

== Digital activism ==
=== Escreva Lola Escreva ===
Aronovich created in 2008 the blog Escreva Lola Escreva, where she publishes author and guest texts. With 260,000 monthly views, the page eventually became one of the references of the feminist movement in Brazil. Dedicated to writings about film and feminism, over time it has also dealt with topics such as racism, homophobia, human rights, critique of advertising and mass media, body acceptance and fat shaming.

In early October 2015, Aronovich was the target of a digital defamation campaign, when a hate speech website was set up on her behalf that attributed to her teacher the defense of infanticide, the burning of bibles and the sale of abortion medication, among other crimes. The fake site has been taken down. The activist has suffered several threats on her work for gender equality.

In 2019, Aronovich was nominated for the Reporters Without Borders's Press Freedom Awards for Courage.
