= Kolonie-Zeitung =

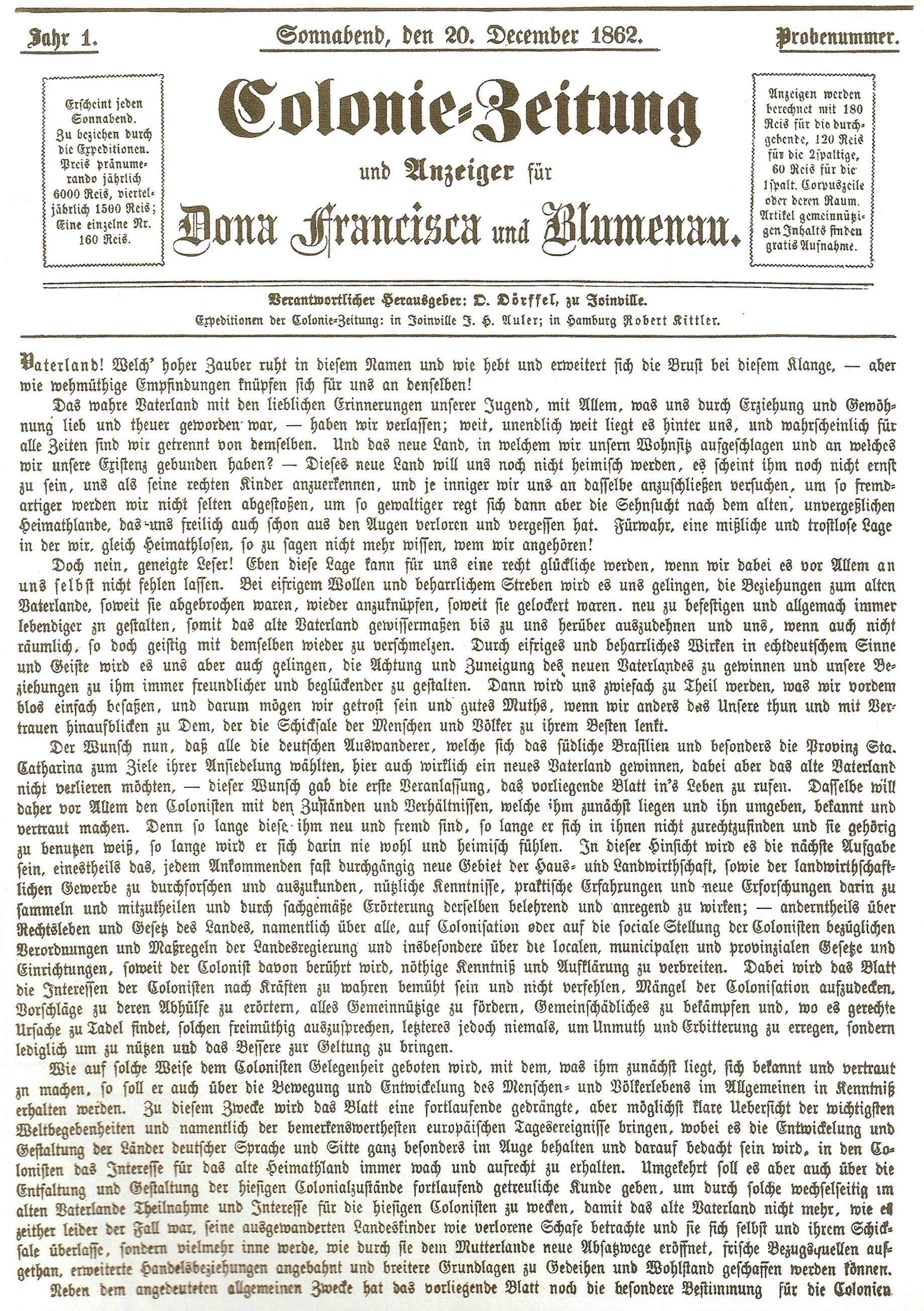
- Scanned image of the first issue of Kolonie-Zeitung, still containing the letter "C"
- Type: Weekly; Biweekly (from 1898)
- Founder: Ottokar Dörffel
- Founded: 20 December 1862
- Ceased publication: 21 May 1942
- Language: German; Portuguese (from 1919)
- Headquarters: Joinville

Kolonie-Zeitung (lit. 'Colony Newspaper') was a newspaper published in Colônia Dona Francisca, the former name for the Brazilian city of Joinville in the state of Santa Catarina. It was founded by Ottokar Dörffel. The first issue was an experimental version published 20 December 1862, just a few days after printing machines arrived from Hamburg. With an initial run of 250 copies, it served to inform the Colônia Dona Francisca and Blumenau, which did not yet have its own newspaper. Doerffel also set 50 copies to the Robert Kitler library in Hamburg, for distribution in Germany.

The full circulation began with issue number 1 on 3 January 1863. Issues were 23.5 × 31.5 cm and were published weekly, increasing to biweekly in 1898. Ottokar Doerffel, a member of the leadership of the colony and representative of Hamburg (replacing B. Poschaan as of 1860), was enthusiastic about cultural development of the colony.

The last issue of was published on 21 May 1942. Although the reasons for the closure have never been made public, it is likely that it was due to the entry of Brazil in the Second World War and the Nationalization campaign promoted by Getúlio Vargas.

Over its 80 years of existence, the newspaper changed its name 5 times:

Start date	End date	Name	Notes
20 December 1862	26 December 1868	Colonie-Zeitung	
2 January 1869	25 October 1917	Kolonie-Zeitung	
6 November 1917	21 August 1919	Actualidade	
26 August 1919	28 August 1941	Kolonie-Zeitung	Became a bilingual newspaper after 75 years
2 September 1941	21 May 1942	Correio Dona Francisca	

== Digitalization ==
The Brazilian national library has digitized some issues.

== See also ==
- Ottokar Doerffel
- Colônia Dona Francisca (now Joinville)
- Colônia São Paulo de Blumenau (now Blumenau)
- German Brazilians
- German-language journalism in Brazil (in Portuguese)
