= Zona Industrial Tupy =

Zona Industrial Tupy is an industrial quarter located in the city of Joinville, Santa Catarina, Brazil. The area is occupied by the Complexo Industrial Tupy.
