= Guanabara, Santa Catarina =

Neighbourhood in Joinville, Santa Catarina, Brazil

Guanabara

Guanabara is a neighborhood in Joinville, Santa Catarina, Brazil. It is located southeast of the city center.
