= Cachoeira dos Índios =

Belém do Cachoeira dos Índios
- Municipality
- The Municipality of Cachoeira dos Índios
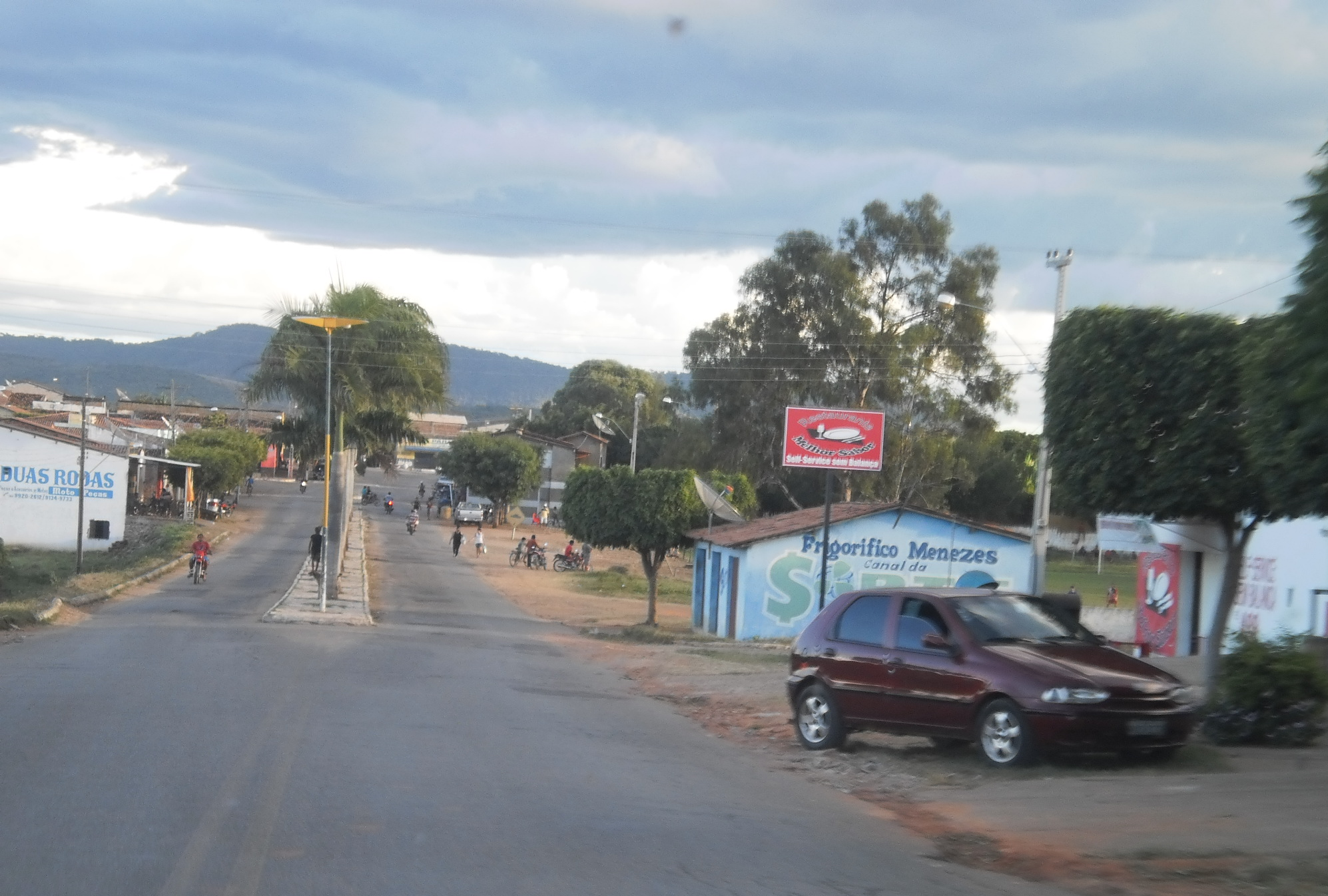

- Flag

- Location of Cachoeira dos Índios in the State of Paraíba
- Coordinates: 06°55′37″S 38°40′26″W
- Country: Brazil
- Region: Northeast
- State: Paraíba

Government
  - Mayor: Francisco Dantas Ricarte (DEM)

Area
  - Total: 172.906 km^{2} (66.759 sq mi)

Population (2020)
  - Total: 10,305
  - Density: 47.5/km^{2} (123/sq mi)
- Time zone: UTC−3 (BRT)
- HDI (2000): 0.577 – medium

Cachoeira dos Índios is the westernmost municipality in the Brazilian state of Paraíba. As of 2020, it had a population of 10,305.
