= Cachoeira River (Joinville) =

River in Santa Catarina, Brazil

Coordinates: 26.3033°S 48.8016°W

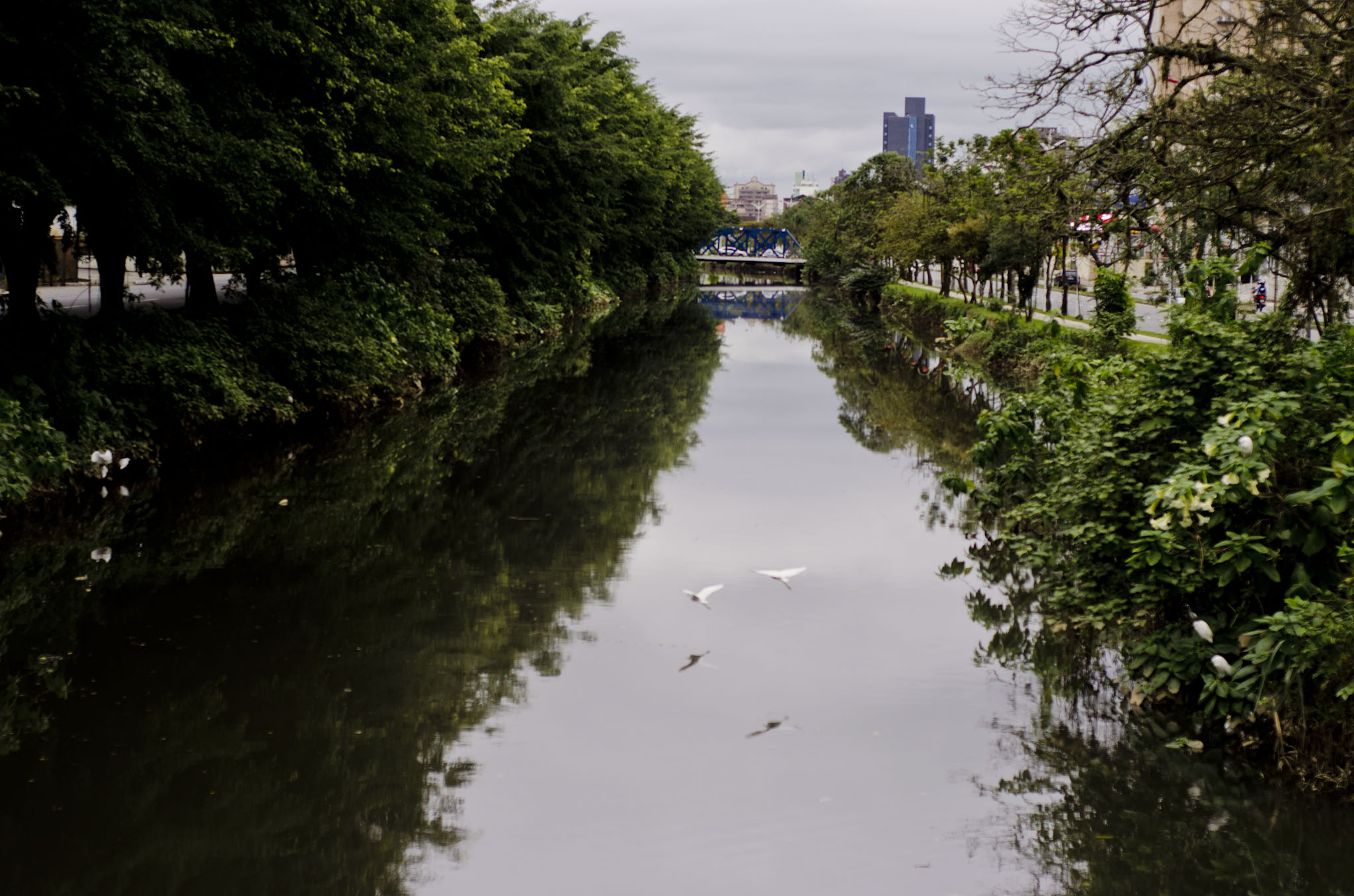
Cachoeira River - Joinville Santa Catarina, Brazil

The Rio Cachoeira is a river in the state of Santa Catarina in Brazil. The river empties into the Baía de Babitonga, a bay connected with the Atlantic Ocean. It flows through the city Joinville.

The project to build a bridge across the river started in May 2024.
