= Afro-Brazilian and Indigenous History and Culture Law =

Brazilian law

The Afro-Brazilian and Indigenous History and Culture Law (Law No. 11.645/2008) is a Brazilian law mandating the teaching of Afro-Brazilian and Indigenous History and Culture which was passed and entered into effectiveness on March 10, 2008. It amends Law No. 9.394, of December 20, 1996, modified by Law No. 10.639, of January 9, 2003, which established the guidelines and bases of Brazilian national education, to include in the official curriculum of the education system the mandatory theme of Afro-Brazilian and Indigenous History and Culture.

== Text ==
The Law reads (unofficial translation):

Art. 1 Art. 26-A of Law 9.394, of December 20, 1996, becomes effective with the following wording:

Art. 26-A. In public and private primary and secondary schools, the study of Afro-Brazilian and indigenous history and culture is mandatory.

§ 1 The syllabus referred to in this article will include several aspects of history and culture that characterize the formation of the Brazilian population, based on these two ethnic groups, such as the study of the history of Africa and Africans, the struggle of blacks and of the indigenous peoples in Brazil, the black and indigenous Brazilian culture and the black and the indigenous in the formation of the national society, rescuing their contributions in the social, economic and political areas, pertinent to the history of Brazil.

§ 2 The contents referring to Afro-Brazilian history and culture and that of Brazilian indigenous peoples will be taught within the entire school curriculum, especially in the areas of artistic education and Brazilian literature and history.

== Prior legislation and guidelines ==
=== Federal Constitution of 1988 and Statute of the Child and Adolescent ===
In regards to the parts of the Constitution and Statute that is relevant to Law 11.645/2008, these bodies of legislation constructed among the fundamental rights of Brazilian children and young adults the right to quality basic education for all. The Constitution of the Federative Republic of Brazil, sometimes known as the Citizen Constitution, named education as one of the social rights they wanted to guarantee. Chapter III, Section I, Article 205 expands further upon education as a social right and emphasizes quality and equity as foundational to this new system. Along with the Statute and Constitution, the National Curriculum Guidelines for the Education of Ethnic and Racial Relations and for the Teaching of Afro-Brazilian and African History and Culture was approved. These state that fullness of citizenship, access to social, economic, and civil rights, and politicians are built on school education.

=== Law No. 9.394, December 20, 1996 ===
This law provided guidelines and bases of national education and curricula. It is also called the Directives and Bases of National Education Law and was originally passed in 1961. Law 9.395 of 1996 is the latest version of this original law and it focuses on restructuring and managing the education system of Brazil more in accordance with the values and goals of a more democratic Brazil.

=== Law No. 10.639, January 9, 2003 ===
Approved by President Lula on January 9, 2003 and by the National Education Council and Ministry of Education in 2004, this law, an amendment to Law 9.394/1996, requires Afro-Brazilian History and Culture must be taught in all age levels and in both public and private institutions. A few of the important topics that the bill demanded by taught are as follows: History of Africa, Struggles of black people in Brazil, Black culture, multi-racial and pluri-ethnic background of Brazilian society, and Leading role of black people in political, economic, social, and cultural spheres of Brazilian history.

This piece of legislation came about as a result of a process of post-dictatorship re-democratization which involved pressure being put on society by a number of Afro-Brazilian movements to ensure their history was taught in schools. Other groups such as trade unions, human rights non-governmental organizations, progressive journalists, educators, and social activists were among the supporters of this bill.

While historically discourse on race relations and issues of racism and violence in Brazil by the idealized construction of their nation as a racial-democracy, this law transformed schools into forums for discussions on these topics to take place.

== Political climate ==
=== Democratic openness and liberal legislation ===
The early 21st century in Brazil was characterized by Luis Inacio Lula da Silva's leftist presidency which lasted from 2003 to 2011. His regime was part of a larger trend of liberalization and democratization that began with the end of the dictatorship and continued to develop through the last few decade of the 20th century. This shift has been termed 'the project of modernity'. During the late 80s and through the 90s Brazil's grasp on democracy was in a state of transition thus Lula's election was an important example of their solidity as the transition of power was very peaceful. Part of his political efforts were devoted towards the process of universalization of education. During this time, millions of Brazilians rose socioeconomically which resulted in more marginalized groups having access to education. The changes to the nationwide curriculum at this time were a response to greater diversity of students in the school system.

=== Broader motivations ===
During this era, there was a larger national conversation occurring about the history, culture, and contributions of black and indigenous people in Brazil. Law 11.645/2008 therefore was an attempt to implement this increased awareness at all levels of education. One of the goals of the inclusion of this history in schools was to combat cycle of racism and discrimination on a systemic level as the education system is seen as a way to transform society.

Additionally, Law 11.645/2008 purposefully included a stronger focus on indigenous history in addition to black history in Brazil. Prior legislation had focused more on just Afro-Brazilian history.

The dominant thought is that teachers should model appreciation for memories, history, and culture of black and indigenous Brazilians so that students will also see the value of this aspect of their education and carry that appreciation throughout the rest of their lives leading to the transformation of a better, more inclusive Brazil.

== Implementation ==
It was decided that the areas of the curriculum where Afro-Brazilian and Indigenous History and Culture fit in best were in Brazilian History, Artistic Education, and Literature.

An important center for implementation is the teaching of this content in teacher education in universities. Thus, this is also a large impediment in implementation because of the variety of experiences teachers had in their own education.

One of the other big obstacles of implementation is that there are a lot of struggles and disagreements between various social sectors that are all in support of the law, but are not unified in what they believe the best approach is to implementation.

Among Brazilian teachers and educators, it is more or less agreed upon that the law exists more so in name than in practice. There are many teachers who have not even heard of the law. The goal of the law is to recognize the history and contributions of Black and Indigenous peoples in Brazil, but the idea of racial harmony is still very prevalent and thus is being reproduced in classrooms by teachers who talk about race through the harmonious lens rather than comment on the historical events and processes that influence race and its construction in Brazil. Textbooks on Brazilian history have not changed a lot in how they address and talk about race since the 1950s when racial democracy was being used to create a Brazilian national identity.

== Reception ==
The main criticisms of Law No. 11.645/2008 focus on its effective implementation within the various levels of the education system in Brazil's states in terms of curriculum planning and materials development, together with the degree of authenticity of the incorporation of the perspectives of the Afro-Brazilian and indigenous peoples themselves.

== See also ==
- Anti-discrimination laws in Brazil
- Indigenous peoples in Brazil
- Law of Brazil
