= Norte Catarinense =

Coordinates: 26°15′00″S 49°22′44″W

Mesoregion Norte Catarinense

Norte Catarinense is a mesoregion in the Brazilian state of Santa Catarina. Its largest and principal city is Joinville.
