= Guaramirim =

Coordinates: 26°27′S 49°00′W

- Municipality
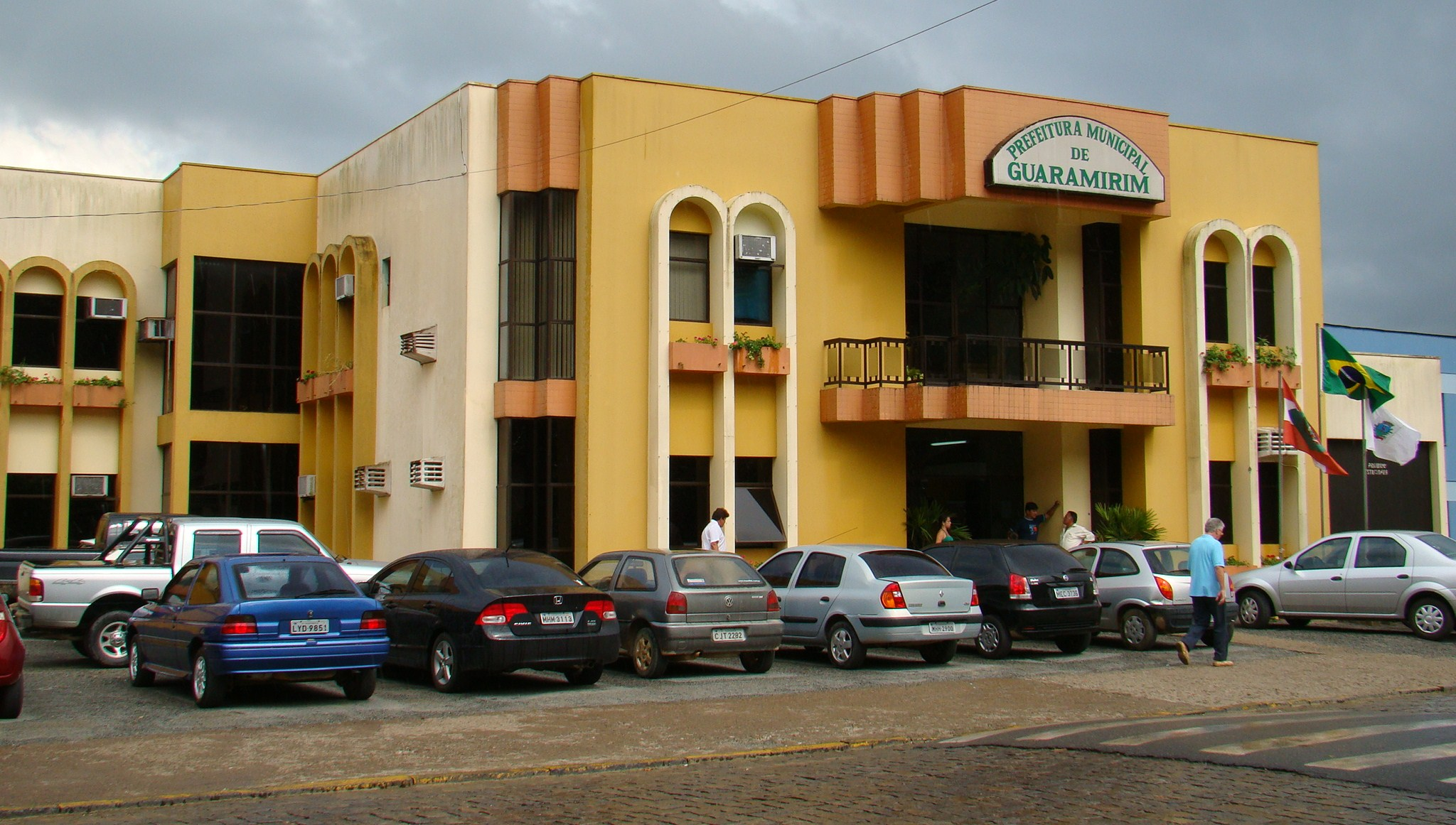

- Flag Coat of arms
- Interactive map of Guaramirim
- Country: Brazil
- Region: South
- State: Santa Catarina
- Mesoregion: Norte Catarinense

Population (2020)
  - Total: 45,797
- Time zone: UTC -3
- Website: www.guaramirim.sc.gov.br

Guaramirim is a municipality in the state of Santa Catarina in the South region of Brazil.

== Notable people ==
- Julio Cesar – football player

== See also ==
- List of municipalities in Santa Catarina
