= Textile industry =

Industry related to design, production and distribution of textiles

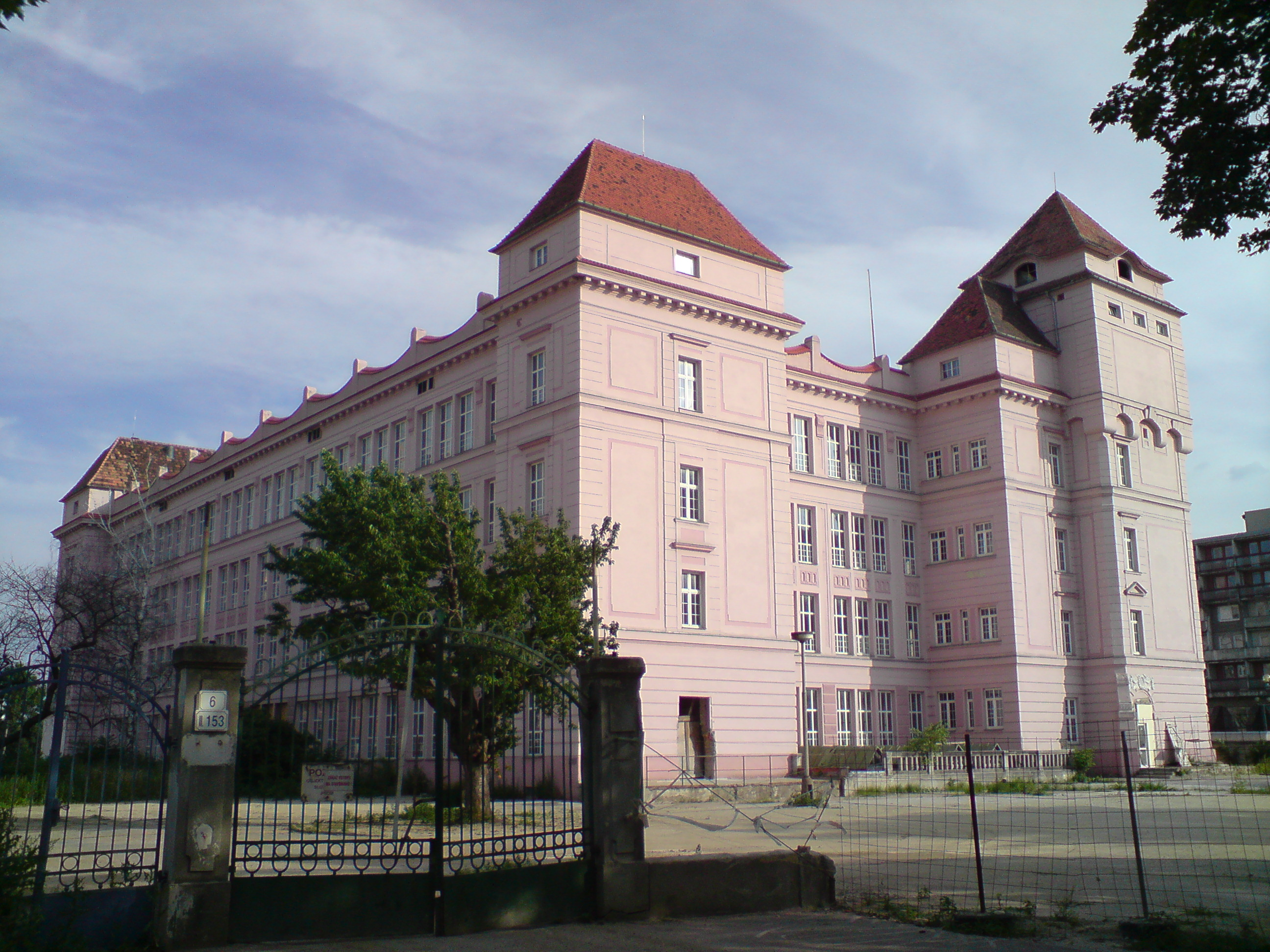
An old textile factory ("Cvernovka") in Bratislava, Slovakia (1901–2004)

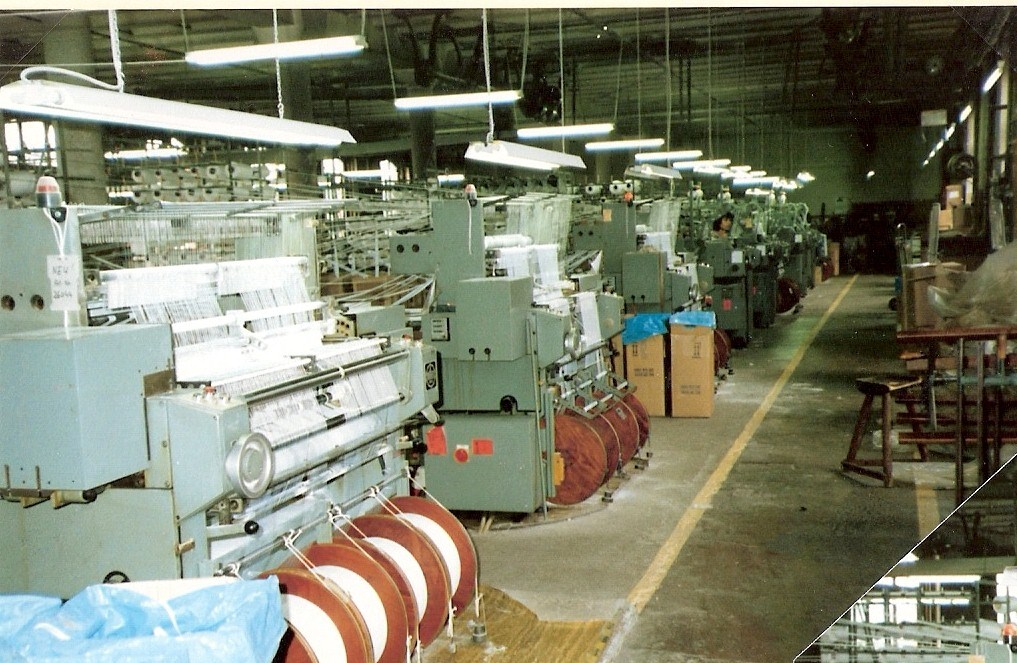
Textile factory (Germany, c. 1975)

The textile industry is primarily concerned with the design, production and distribution of textiles: yarn, cloth and clothing.

== Industry process ==
=== Cotton manufacturing ===
Cotton manufacturing processes
Bale breaker
Willowing
Breaker scutcher	Batting
Finishing scutcher	Lapping
Carding
Sliver lap
Combing
Drawing
Slubbing
Intermediate
Roving	Fine roving
Mule spinning	Ring spinning
Reeling
Winding	Bundling
Weaving shed
Beaming
Warping
Sizing/slashing/dressing
Weaving
Cloth	Yarn (cheese) Bundle

Blowing room
Teasing
Carding room
Spinning
Doubling
Bleaching
Winding
Cabling
Gassing
Spooling
Sewing thread

Cotton is the world's most important natural fibre. In the year 2007, the global yield was 25 million tons from 35 million hectares cultivated in more than 50 countries. There are five stages of cotton manufacturing:

- Cultivating and harvesting
- Preparatory processes
- Spinning – giving yarn
- Fabric construction
- Finishing – giving textiles

In the textile industry, textile engineering is an area of engineering that involves the design, production, and distribution of textile products through processes including cultivation, harvesting, spinning, weaving, and finishing of raw materials, encompassing both natural and synthetic fibres.

=== Synthetic fibres ===
Artificial fibres can be made by extruding a polymer, through a spinneret (polymers) into a medium where it hardens. Wet spinning (rayon) uses a coagulating medium. In dry spinning (acetate and triacetate), the polymer is contained in a solvent that evaporates in the heated exit chamber. In melt spinning (nylons and polyesters) the extruded polymer is cooled in gas or air and then sets. Some examples of synthetic fibres are polyester, rayon, acrylic fibres and microfibres. All these fibres will be of great length, often kilometres long. Synthetic fibres are more durable than most natural fibres and will readily pick-up different dyes. Artificial fibres can be processed as long fibres or batched and cut so they can be processed like natural fibre.

=== Natural fibres ===
Sheep, goats, rabbits, silkworms, and other animals, as well as minerals like asbestos, are sources of natural fibres (cotton, flax, sisal). These vegetable fibres can originate from the seed (cotton), the stem (bast fibres: flax, hemp, jute), or the leaf (sisal). All of these sources require a number of steps, each of which has a distinct name, before a clean, even staple is produced. All of these fibres, with the exception of silk, are short, only a few centimetres long, and have a rough surface that allows them to adhere to other like staple fibres.

== History ==
=== Cottage stage ===
There are some indications that weaving was already known in the Palaeolithic. An indistinct textile impression has been found at Pavlov, Moravia. Neolithic textiles were found in pile dwellings excavations in Switzerland and at El Fayum, Egypt at a site which dates to about 5000 BC.

In Roman times, wool, linen and leather clothed the European population, and silk, imported along the Silk Road from China, was an extravagant luxury. The use of flax fibre in the manufacturing of cloth in Northern Europe dates back to Neolithic times.

During the late medieval period, cotton began to be imported into Northern Europe. Without any knowledge of what it came from, other than that it was a plant, noting its similarities to wool, people in the region could only imagine that cotton must be produced by plant-borne sheep. John Mandeville, writing in 1350, stated as fact the now-preposterous belief: "There grew in India a wonderful tree which bore tiny lambs on the edges of its branches. These branches were so pliable that they bent down to allow the lambs to feed when they are hungry." This aspect is retained in the name for cotton in many European languages, such as German Baumwolle, which translates as "tree wool". By the end of the 16th century, cotton was cultivated throughout the warmer regions of Asia and the Americas.

The main steps in the production of cloth are producing the fibre, preparing it, converting it to yarn, converting yarn to cloth, and then finishing the cloth. The cloth is then taken to the manufacturer of garments. The preparation of the fibres differs the most, depending on the fibre used. Flax requires retting and dressing, while wool requires carding and washing. The spinning and weaving processes are very similar between fibres, however.

Spinning evolved from twisting the fibres by hand, to using a drop spindle, to using a spinning wheel. Spindles or parts of them have been found in archaeological sites and may represent one of the first pieces of technology available. The spinning wheel was most likely invented in the Islamic world by the 11th century.

=== Industrial Revolution ===
The woven fabric portion of the textile industry grew out of the Industrial Revolution in the 18th century as mass production of yarn and cloth became a mainstream industry.

In 1734 in Bury, Lancashire John Kay invented the flying shuttle — one of the first of a series of inventions associated with the cotton woven fabric industry. The flying shuttle increased the width of cotton cloth and speed of production of a single weaver at a loom. Resistance by workers to the perceived threat to jobs delayed the widespread introduction of this technology, even though the higher rate of production generated an increased demand for spun cotton.

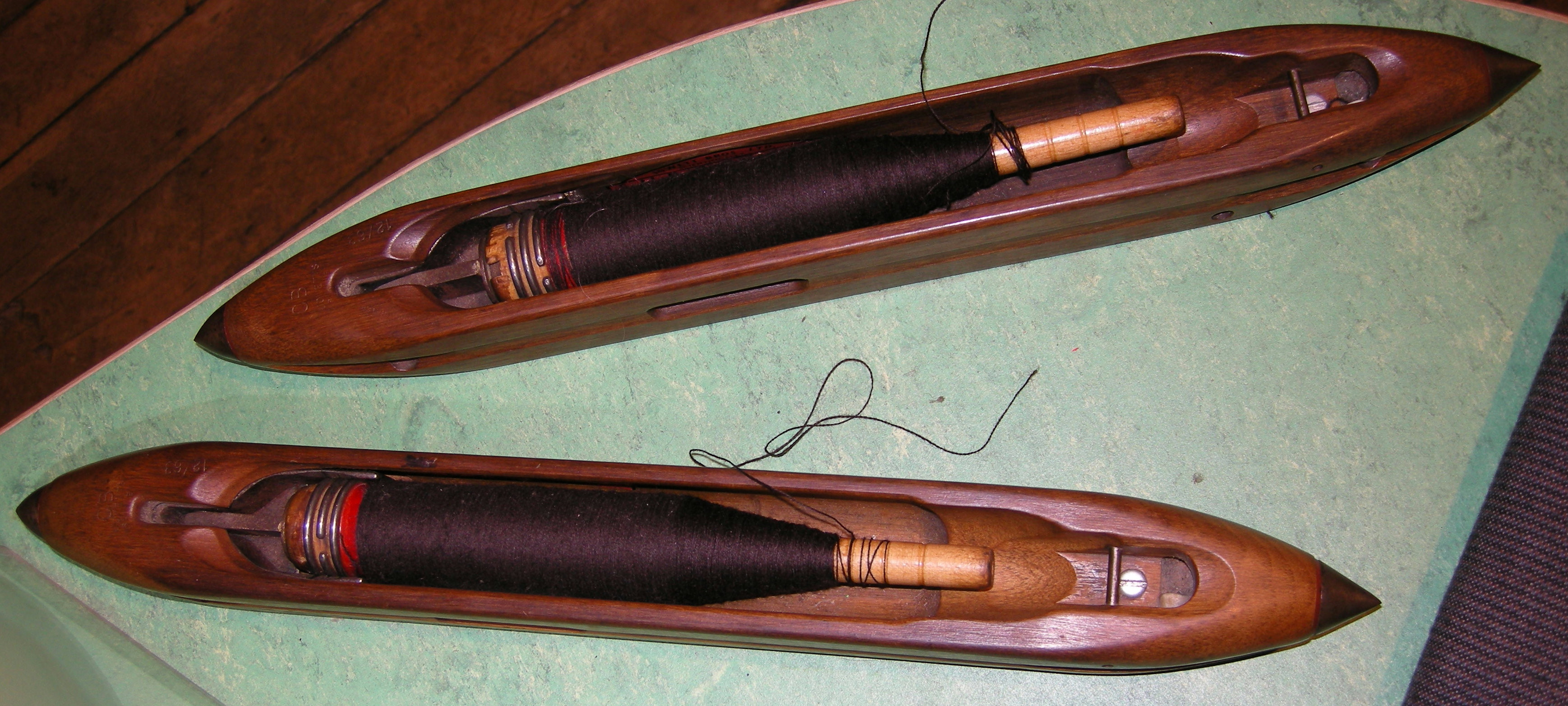
Shuttles

In 1761, the Duke of Bridgewater's canal connected Manchester to the coal fields of Worsley and in 1762, Matthew Boulton opened the Soho Foundry engineering works in Handsworth, Birmingham. His partnership with Scottish engineer James Watt resulted, in 1775, in the commercial production of the more efficient Watt steam engine which used a separate condenser.

In 1764, James Hargreaves is credited as inventor of the spinning jenny which multiplied the spun thread production capacity of a single worker — initially eightfold and subsequently much further. Others credit the invention to Thomas Highs. Industrial unrest and a failure to patent the invention until 1770 forced Hargreaves from Blackburn, but his lack of protection of the idea allowed the concept to be exploited by others. As a result, there were more than 20,000 spinning jennies in use by the time of his death. Also in 1764, Thorp Mill, the first water-powered cotton mill in the world was constructed at Royton, Lancashire, and was used for carding cotton. With the spinning and weaving process now mechanised, cotton mills cropped up all over the North West of England.

The stocking frame invented in 1589 for silk became viable when in 1759, Jedediah Strutt introduced an attachment for the frame which produced what became known as the Derby Rib, that produced a knit and purl stitch. This allowed stockings to be manufactured in silk and later in cotton. In 1768, Hammond modified the stocking frame to weave weft-knitted openworks or nets by crossing over the loops, using a mobile tickler bar – this led in 1781 to Thomas Frost's square net. Cotton had been too coarse for lace, but by 1805 Houldsworths of Manchester were producing reliable 300 count cotton thread.

=== 19th-century developments ===
With the Cartwright Loom, the Spinning Mule and the Boulton & Watt steam engine, the pieces were in place to build a mechanised woven fabric textile industry. From this point there were no new inventions, but a continuous improvement in technology as the mill-owner strove to reduce cost and improve quality. Developments in the transport infrastructure; that is the canals and after 1831 the railways facilitated the import of raw materials and export of finished cloth.

Firstly, the use of water power to drive mills was supplemented by steam driven water pumps, and then superseded completely by the steam engines. For example, Samuel Greg joined his uncle's firm of textile merchants, and, on taking over the company in 1782, he sought out a site to establish a mill. Quarry Bank Mill was built on the River Bollin at Styal in Cheshire. It was initially powered by a water wheel, but installed steam engines in 1810. Quarry Bank Mill in Cheshire still exists as a well-preserved museum, having been in use from its construction in 1784 until 1959. It also illustrates how the mill owners exploited child labour, taking orphans from nearby Manchester to work the cotton. It shows that these children were housed, clothed, fed and provided with some education. In 1830, the average power of a mill engine was 48 hp, but Quarry Bank mill installed a new 100 hp water wheel. William Fairbairn addressed the problem of line-shafting and was responsible for improving the efficiency of the mill. In 1815 he replaced the wooden turning shafts that drove the machines at 50rpm, to wrought iron shafting working at 250 rpm, these were a third of the weight of the previous ones and absorbed less power.

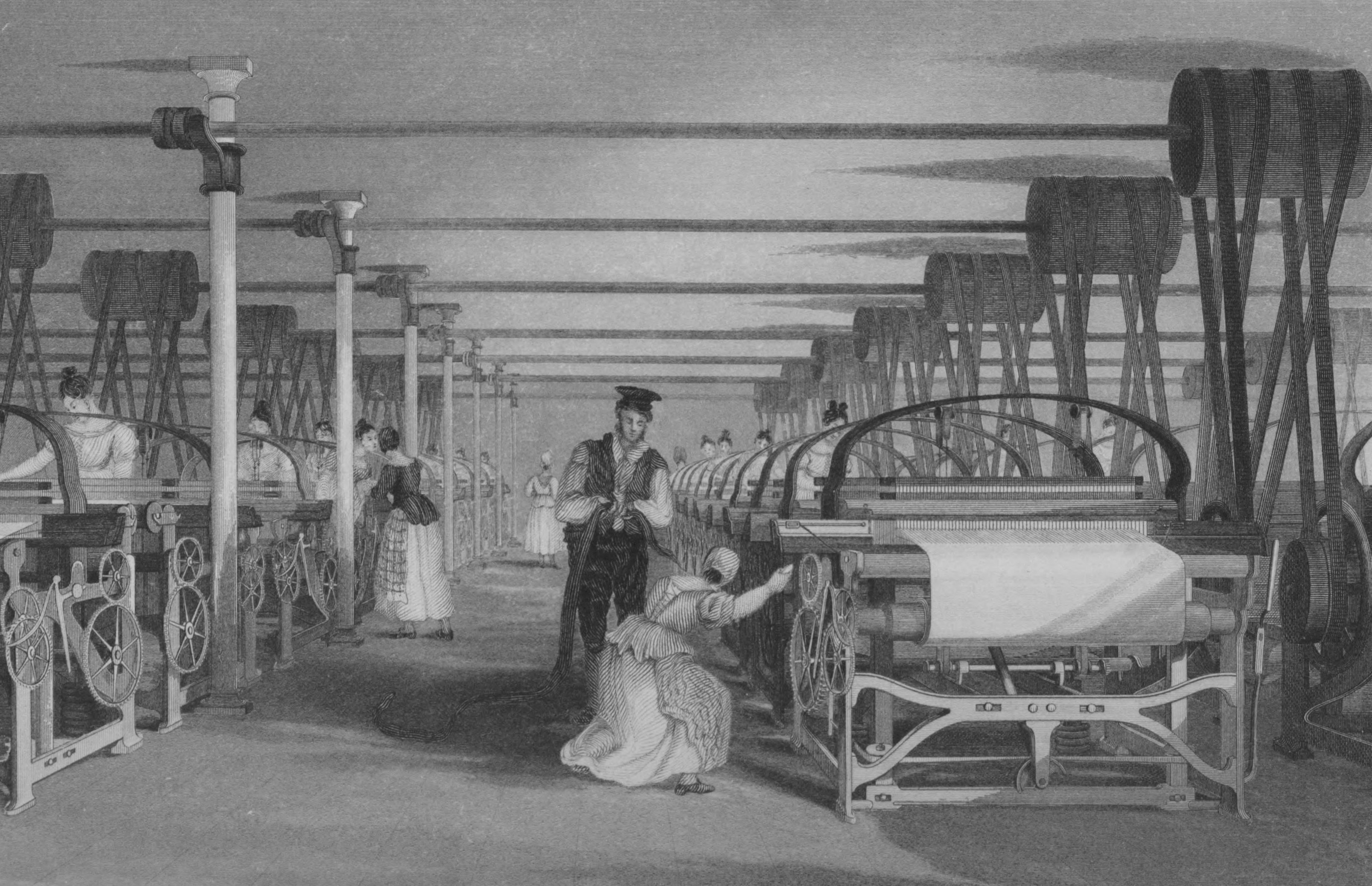
A Roberts loom in a weaving shed in 1835. Note the wrought iron shafting, fixed to the cast iron columns.

Secondly, in 1830, using an 1822 patent, Richard Roberts manufactured the first loom with a cast iron frame, the Roberts Loom. In 1842 James Bullough and William Kenworthy, made the Lancashire Loom, a semiautomatic power loom: although it is self-acting, it has to be stopped to recharge empty shuttles. It was the mainstay of the Lancashire cotton industry for a century, until the Northrop Loom (invented in 1894, with an automatic weft replenishment function) gained ascendancy.

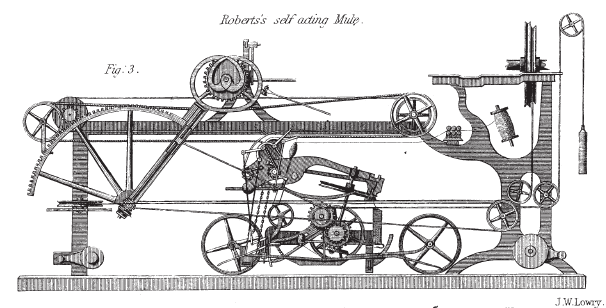
Roberts self-acting mule with quadrant gearing

Thirdly, also in 1830, Richard Roberts patented the first self-acting mule. Stalybridge mule spinners strike was in 1824; this stimulated research into the problem of applying power to the winding stroke of the mule. The draw while spinning had been assisted by power, but the push of the wind had been done manually by the spinner, the mule could be operated by semiskilled labor. Before 1830, the spinner would operate a partially powered mule with a maximum of 400 spindles; after, self-acting mules with up to 1300 spindles could be built.

Number of looms in the UK
Year	1803	1820	1829	1833	1857
Looms	2400	14650	55500	100000	250000

The Industrial Revolution changed the nature of work and society The three key drivers in these changes were textile manufacturing, iron founding and steam power. The geographical focus of textile manufacture in Britain was Manchester and the small towns of the Pennines and southern Lancashire.

Textile production in England peaked in 1926, and as mills were decommissioned, many of the scrapped mules and looms were bought up and reinstated in India.

Women began entering the workforce in the 19th century through textile factories, the industrial and garment assembly jobs done during this time "[provided a] point for participation by rural women in the formal economy". While women began entering the workforce and earning wages for themselves, there was an assumption that the earned wages were ones that should "supplement the family income rather than provide it", which was typically done by that of the breadwinning father or husband. It was commonly acknowledged that the role of a woman as a textile worker was a "secondary occupation and that a woman's real work was raising children and running the household". This socially accepted convention was illustrated in the hiring process of female textile workers, employers preferred "hiring women who were young and unmarried: most machine operatives were between the ages of 16 and 25". This also affected the wage of female textile workers, since it was considered that a women's wage in the textile industry was one to supplement the family, there was a "belief that women did not merit or require wages as high as those of men".

=== 20th century ===
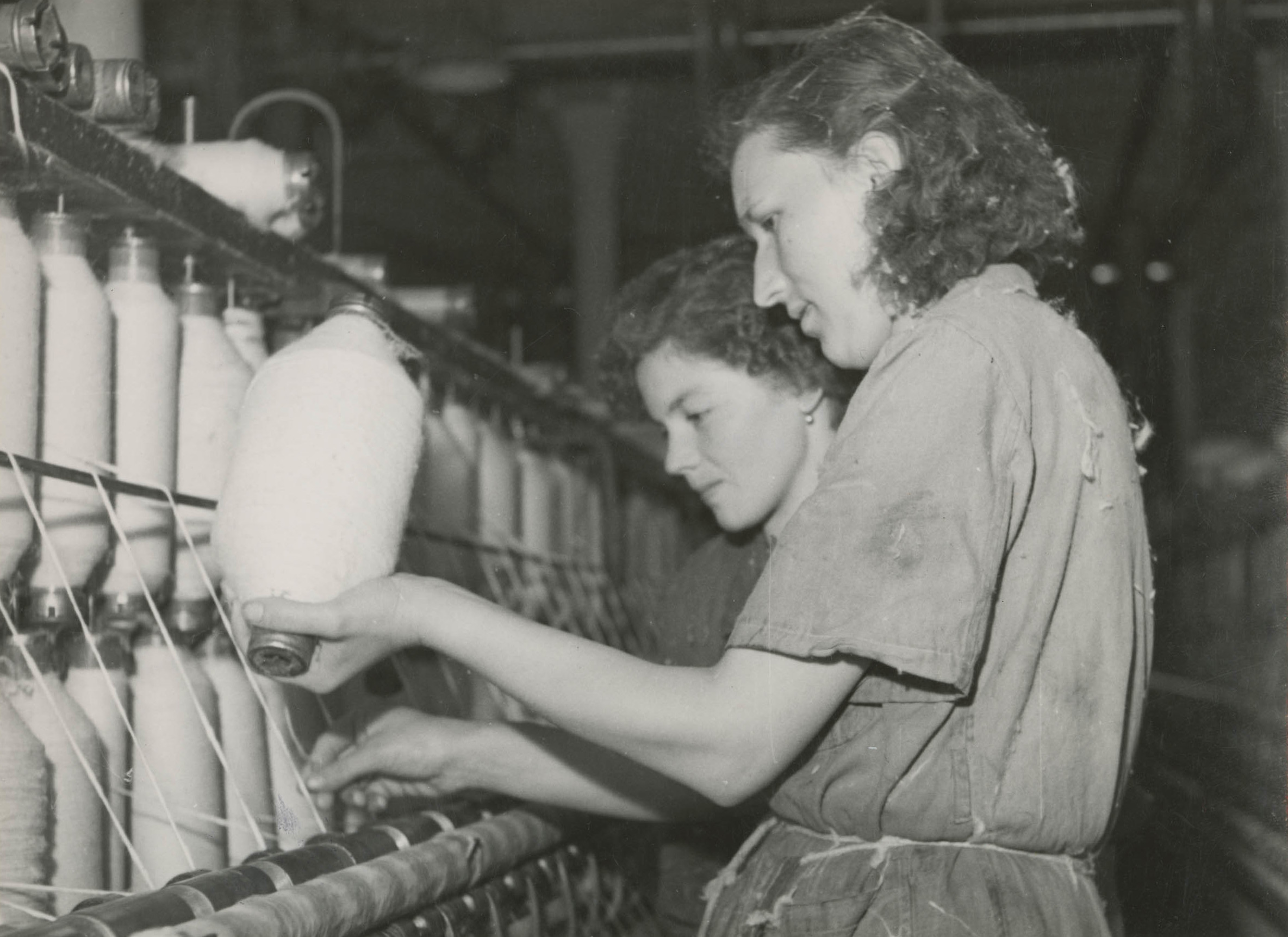
Textile factory workers in Poland, 1950s

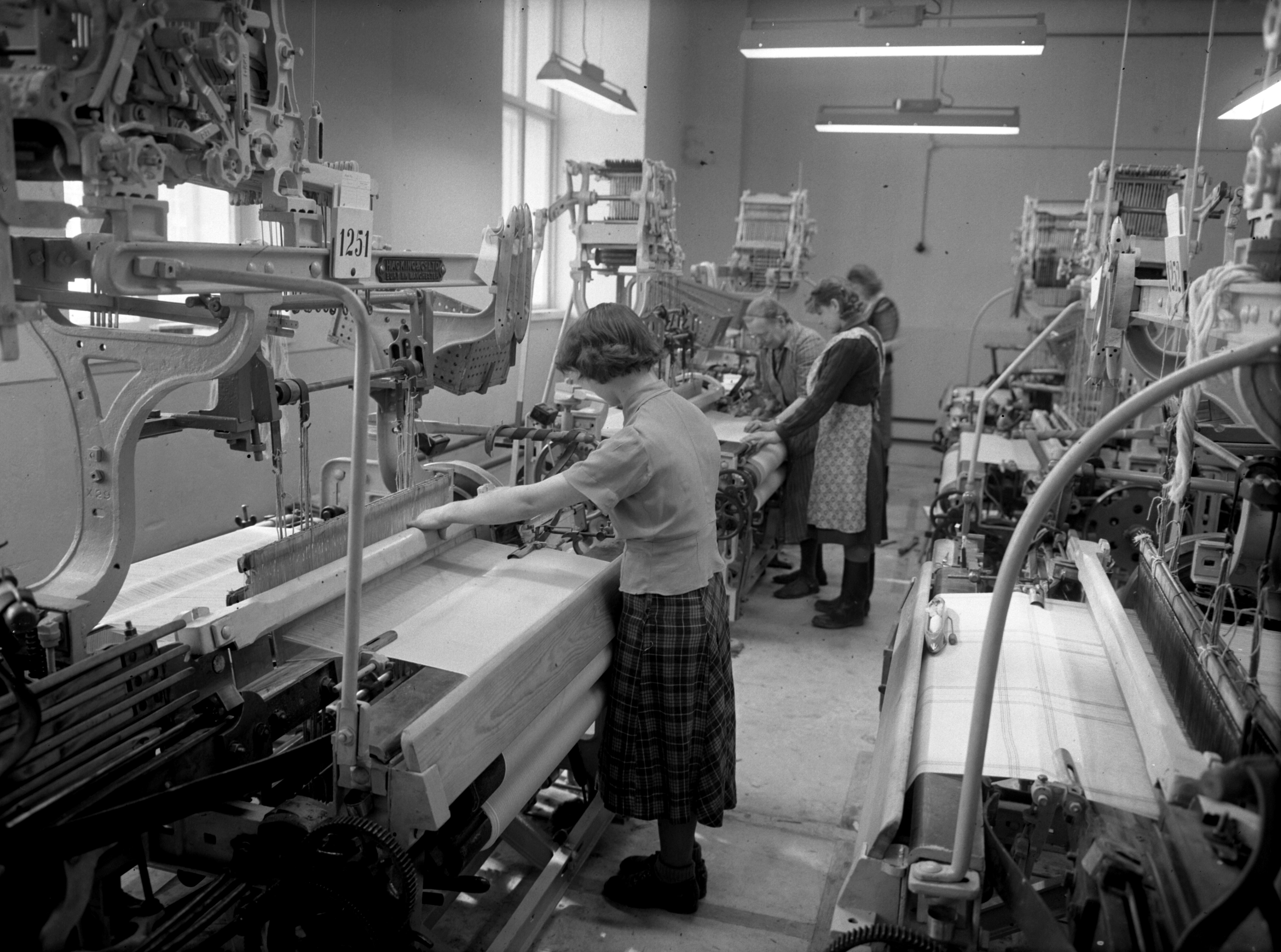
Textile workers at Finlayson factory in Tampere, Finland in 1951

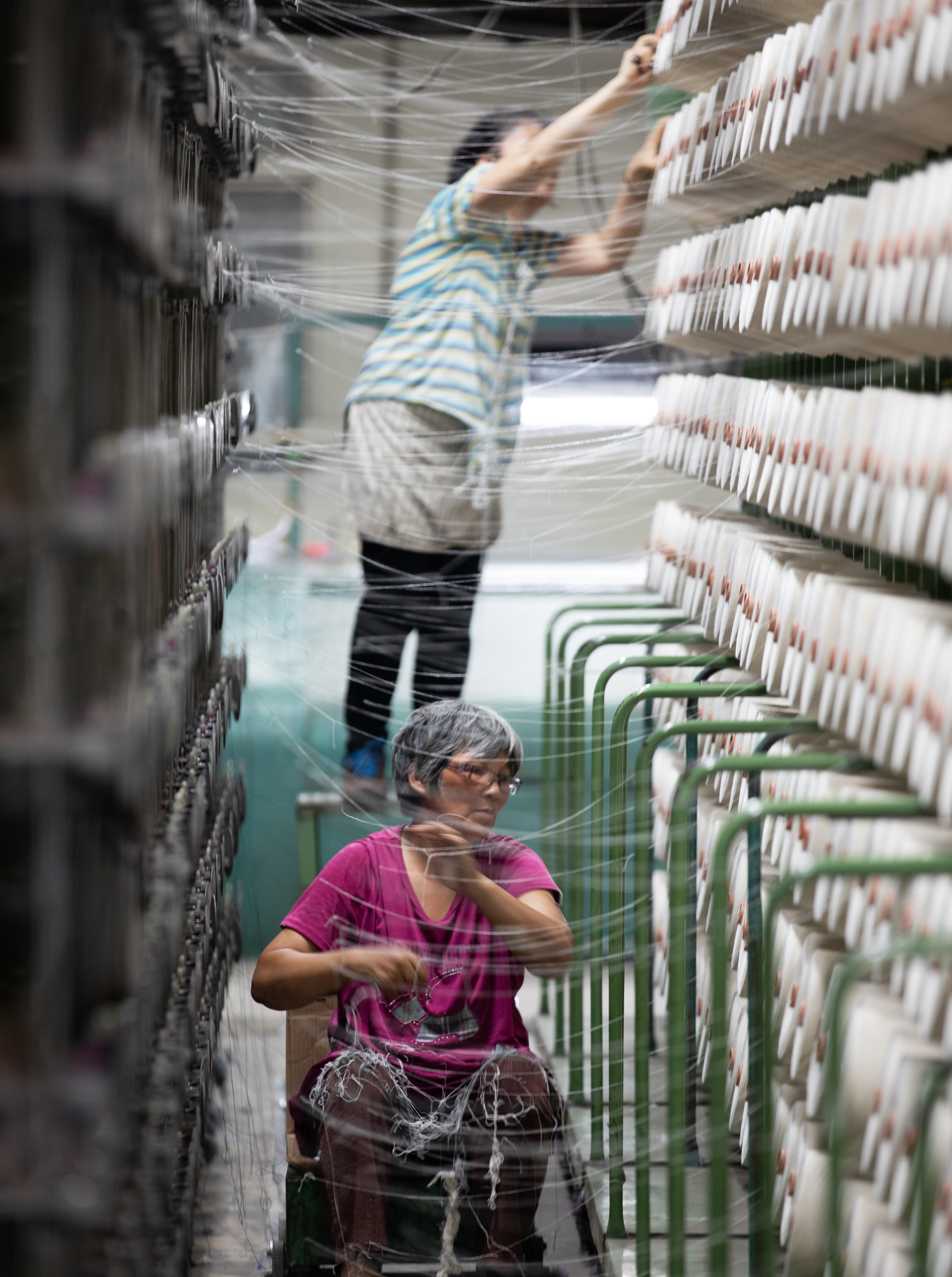
Manila hemp warp yarns being prepared for weaving in a modern textile factory

Major changes came to the textile industry during the 20th century, with continuing technological innovations in machinery, synthetic fibre, logistics, and globalisation of the business. The business model that had dominated the industry for centuries was to change radically. Cotton and wool producers were not the only source for fibres, as chemical companies created new synthetic fibres that had superior qualities for many uses, such as rayon, invented in 1910, and DuPont's nylon, invented in 1935 as in inexpensive silk substitute, and used for products ranging from women's stockings to tooth brushes and military parachutes.

The variety of synthetic fibres used in manufacturing fibre grew steadily throughout the 20th century. In the 1920s, the computer was invented; in the 1940s, acetate, modacrylic, metal fibres, and saran were developed; acrylic, polyester, and spandex were introduced in the 1950s. Polyester became hugely popular in the apparel market, and by the late 1970s, more polyester was sold in the United States than cotton.

By the late 1980s, the apparel segment was no longer the largest market for fibre products, with industrial and home furnishings together representing a larger proportion of the fibre market. Industry integration and global manufacturing led to many small firms closing for good during the 1970s and 1980s in the United States; during those decades, 95% of the looms in North Carolina, South Carolina and Georgia shut down, and Alabama and Virginia also saw many factories close.

The largest exporters of textiles in 2013 were China ($274 billion), India ($40 billion), Italy ($36 billion), Germany ($35 billion), Bangladesh ($28 billion) and Pakistan ($27 Billion).

== By region ==
=== India ===
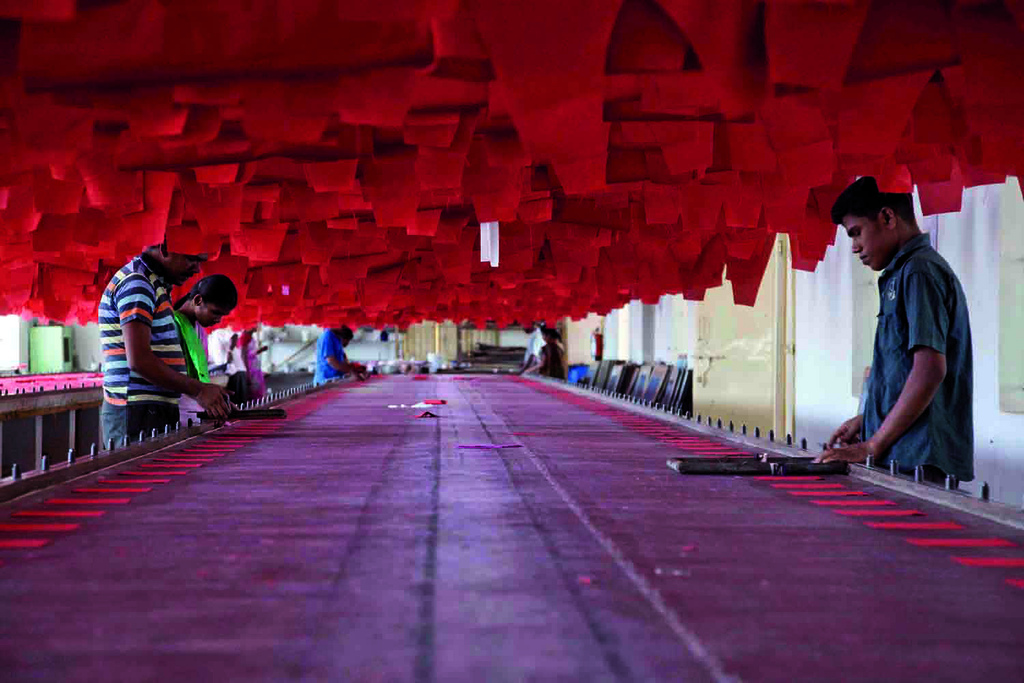
Textile workers in Tiruppur, South India

The textile industry in India traditionally, after agriculture, is the only industry that has generated huge employment for both skilled and unskilled labour in textiles. The textile industry continues to be the second-largest employment generating sector in India. It offers direct employment to over 35 million in the country. According to the Ministry of Textiles, the share of textiles in total exports during April–July 2010 was 11.04%. During 2009–2010, the Indian textile industry was pegged at US$55 billion, 64% of which services domestic demand. In 2010, there were 2,500 textile weaving factories and 4,135 textile finishing factories in all of India. According to AT Kearney's 'Retail Apparel Index', India was ranked as the fourth most promising market for apparel retailers in 2009.

India is first in global jute production and shares 63% of the global textile and garment market. India is second in global textile manufacturing and also second in silk and cotton production. 100% FDI is allowed via automatic route in textile sector. Rieter, Trutzschler, Saurer, Soktas, Zambiati, Bilsar, Monti, CMT, E-land, Nisshinbo, Marks & Spencer, Zara, Promod, Benetton, and Levi's are some of the foreign textile companies invested or working in India.

=== Great Britain ===
The key British industry at the beginning of the 18th century was the production of textiles made with wool from the large sheep-farming areas in the Midlands and across the country (created as a result of land-clearance and enclosure). This was a labour-intensive activity providing employment throughout Britain, with major centres being the West Country; Norwich and environs; and the West Riding of Yorkshire. The export trade in woolen goods accounted for more than a quarter of British exports during most of the 18th century, doubling between 1701 and 1770. The British textile industry drove the Industrial Revolution, triggering advancements in technology, stimulating the coal and iron industries, boosting raw material imports, and improving transportation, which made Britain the global leader of industrialisation, trade, and scientific innovation.

Exports by the cotton industry – centered in Lancashire – had grown tenfold during this time, but still accounted for only a tenth of the value of the woolen trade. Before the 17th century, the manufacture of goods was performed on a limited scale by individual workers, usually on their own premises (such as weavers' cottages). Goods were transported around the country by clothiers who visited the village with their trains of packhorses. Some of the cloth was made into clothes for people living in the same area, and a large amount of cloth was exported. River navigations were constructed, and some contour-following canals. In the early 18th century, artisans were inventing ways to become more productive. Silk, wool, fustian, and linen were being eclipsed by cotton, which was becoming the most important textile. This set the foundations for the changes.

=== Pakistan ===
The textile sector accounts for 54% of Pakistan's export earnings. The industry's contribution in the nation's exports account for 8.5% of the total GDP. Textile exports stood at $4.4 billion in 2017–18. The industry employs a large section of the labour force in the country.

Pakistan is the 4th largest producer of cotton with the third largest spinning capacity in Asia. It contributes 5% to the global spinning capacity. At present, there are 1,221 ginning units, 442 spinning units and 124 large spinning units in addition to 425 small units which produce textiles. Pakistan is the third largest consumer of cotton. Exports of $3.5 billion were recorded in 2017–18 (6.5% of the total exported cotton on the world).

In 1950, textile manufacturing emerged as the centre of Pakistan industrialisation. Between 1947 and 2000, the number of textile Mills increased from 3 to 600. In the same time, spindles increased in number from 177,000 to 805 million.

=== Bangladesh ===
Many Western multinationals use labor in Bangladesh, which is one of the cheapest in the world: 30 euros per month compared to 150 or 200 in China. Four days is enough for the CEO of one of the top five global textile brands to earn what a Bangladeshi garment worker will earn in her lifetime. In April 2013, at least 1,135 textile workers died in the collapse of their factory. Other fatal accidents due to unsanitary factories have affected Bangladesh: in 2005 a factory collapsed and caused the death of 64 people. In 2006, a series of fires killed 85 people and injured 207 others. In 2010, some 30 people died of asphyxiation and burns in two serious fires.

In 2006, tens of thousands of workers mobilised in one of the country's largest strike movements, affecting almost all of the 4,000 factories. The Bangladesh Garment Manufacturers and Exporters Association (BGMEA) uses police forces to crack down. Three workers were killed, and hundreds more were wounded by bullets, or imprisoned. In 2010, after a new strike movement, nearly 1,000 people were injured among workers as a result of the repression.

=== Ethiopia ===
Employees of Ethiopian garment factories, who work for brands such as Guess, H&M or Calvin Klein, receive a monthly salary of 26 dollars per month. These very low wages have led to low productivity, frequent strikes and high turnover. Some factories have replaced all their employees on average every 12 months, according to the 2019 report of the Stern Centre for Business and Human Rights at New York University.

The report states: "Rather than the docile and cheap labour force promoted in Ethiopia, foreign-based suppliers have met employees who are unhappy with their pay and living conditions and who want to protest more and more by stopping work or even quitting. In their eagerness to create a 'made in Ethiopia' brand, the government, global brands and foreign manufacturers did not anticipate that the base salary was simply too low for workers to make a living from."

=== European Union ===
The prominence of small and medium enterprises (SMEs) within the European Union's textile industry has been noted by the European Commission:

The European textile and clothing industry is a highly diversified, innovation and creativity driven industrial sector made up largely of SMEs: firms had an average of 10 employees in 2009, down from 18 employees at the beginning of the decade. In 2011, the sector consisted of more than 185 000 companies employing 1.7 million people in Europe and with a total turnover of €152 billion.

==== Catalonia ====
The cotton industry in Catalonia was the first industry in Spain to industrialise and led, by the mid 19th century, to Catalonia becoming the main industrial region of Spain, a position it maintained until well into the 20th century. Catalonia is the one Mediterranean exception to the tendency of early industrialisation to be concentrated in northern Europe.

The industry began in the early 18th century in Barcelona, when printed cloth chintz (Catalan: indianes) was produced as an import substitution. The market quickly expanded to the American colonies from where dyes and (later) cotton raw materials could be sourced. Spinning was a late addition to the industry and took off after English spinning technology was introduced at the turn of the 19th century. Industrialisation of the industry occurred in the 1830s after adoption of the factory system, and the removal of restrictions by Britain on the emigration of expert labour (1825) and of machinery (1842). Steam power was introduced but the cost of imported coal and steam engines, led to the extensive use of hydraulic power from the late 1860s.

== Commerce and regulation ==
The Multi Fibre Arrangement (MFA) governed the world trade in textiles and garments from 1974 through 2004, imposing quotas on the amount developing countries could export to developed countries. It expired on 1 January 2005.

The MFA was introduced in 1974 as a short-term measure intended to allow developed countries to adjust to imports from the developing world. Developing countries have a natural advantage in textile production because it is labor-intensive and they have low labor costs. According to a World Bank/International Monetary Fund (IMF) study, the system has cost the developing world 27 million jobs and $40 billion a year in lost exports.

However, the Arrangement was not negative for all developing countries. For example, the European Union (EU) imposed no restrictions or duties on imports from the very poor countries, such as Bangladesh, leading to a massive expansion of the industry there.

At the General Agreement on Tariffs and Trade (GATT) Uruguay Round, it was decided to bring the textile trade under the jurisdiction of the World Trade Organization (WTO). The WTO Agreement on Textiles and Clothing (ATC) provided for the gradual dismantling of the quotas that existed under the MFA. This process was completed on 1 January 2005. However, large tariffs remain in place on many textile products.

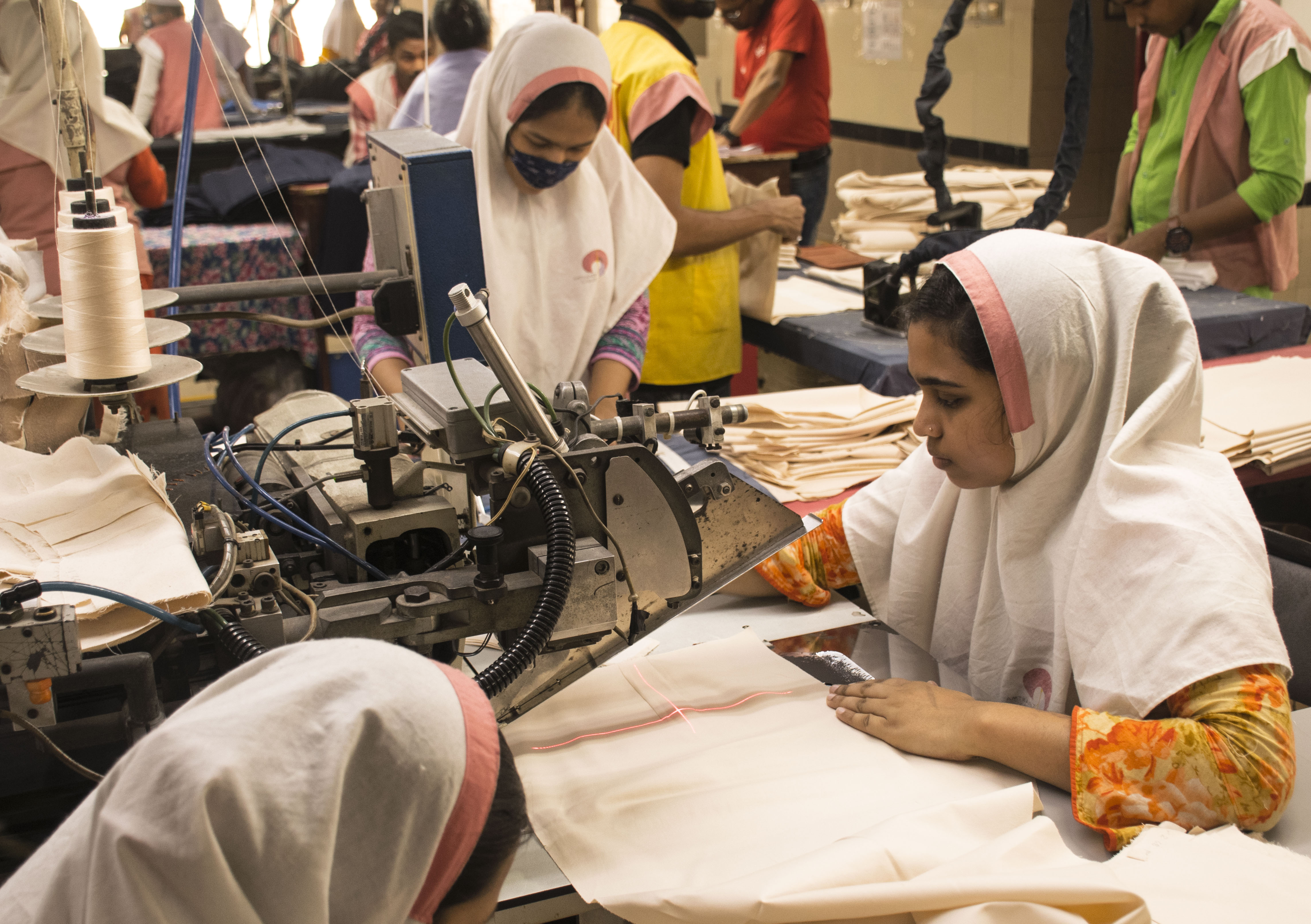
Women work in a textile factory outside Dhaka, Bangladesh.

Bangladesh was expected to suffer the most from the ending of the MFA, as it was expected to face more competition, particularly from China. However, this was not the case. It turns out that even in the face of other economic giants, Bangladesh's labor is "cheaper than anywhere else in the world." While some smaller factories were documented making pay cuts and layoffs, most downsizing was essentially speculative – the orders for goods kept coming even after the MFA expired. In fact, Bangladesh's exports increased in value by about $500 million in 2006.

=== Fast fashion and impacts on the textile industry ===
As the textile industry grew in size, it also continuously grew in demand, largely due to the rise of the fast fashion industry. Fast fashion is defined as a clothing company strategy where companies are able to keep prices for their goods low by cutting costs in production, and are able to keep up with trends by having quick design to product turnaround speeds. In the 21st century, with the rise of globalization, more fast fashion companies have become worldwide powerhouses, including Shein, Temu and H&M.

This rise of fast fashion has increased demand for cheap textiles. It has also exacerbated the negative environmental impacts and worker health impacts that are prevalent in the textile industry. Despite the growth of Fast Fashion, multiple reports have concluded that less than 2% of garment workers worldwide earn a living wage.

=== Increased Regulation ===
In recent years, as the environmental impacts of the textile industry have been growing alongside the growth of Fast Fashion, many global institutions have been increasing regulation on the Textile Industry. For example, the European Commission in 2022 passed the EU Strategy for Sustainable and Circular Textiles under the European Green Deal. The goal of this regulation is for Textiles to be made to last longer, be made of more recycled materials, and be easier to recycle after use. Another example is the state of California, located in the United States, where in 2024 the California Responsible Textile Recovery Act passed. This act changes how textile producers are held accountable for a product throughout the entirety of its life cycle, making the textile producer responsible for waste management. Across the United States, similar acts have been proposed, including in New York State where the New York State Fashion Sustainability and Social Accountability Act (Fashion Act) hopes to hold companies selling in the state of New York to a higher environmental and human rights standard.

=== Advocacy for Change ===
Workers have been advocating for their rights in the textile industry for hundreds of years, including the Luddites in the 19th century. More recently, many mostly female workers in this industry, located around the globe, have attempted to unionize and have faced threats to their jobs. Furthermore, protestors have faced violence and arrest. Workers have begun speaking out about the consistent violation of human rights in the Textile Industry, advocating for change globally.

As the effects of the Textile Industry have come to light, many organizations have emerged hoping to make changes in this industry. Some examples include Carro de Combate, Fashion Takes Action, New Order of Fashion, FABSCRAP, and more. Many organizations are advocating for a Circular fashion Economy, which would be a Fashion Economy that prioritizes minimizing waste and maximizing the use of resources.

== Regulatory standards ==
For textiles, like for many other products, there are certain national and international standards and regulations that need to be complied with to ensure quality, safety and sustainability.

The following standards amongst others apply to textiles:

- CPSIA, e.g. Standard for the Flammability of Clothing Textiles
- ASTM Textile Standards
- REACH Regulations for Textiles
- China Product Standard for Textiles
- In the European Union, the Textile Regulation (Regulation 1007/2011 on textile fibre names and related labelling and marking of fibre composition of textile products) applies. This replaced earlier Directives 73/44/EC, 96/73/EC and 2008/121/EC, which had required transposition into national law, with effect from 8 May 2012.

== Environmental impact ==
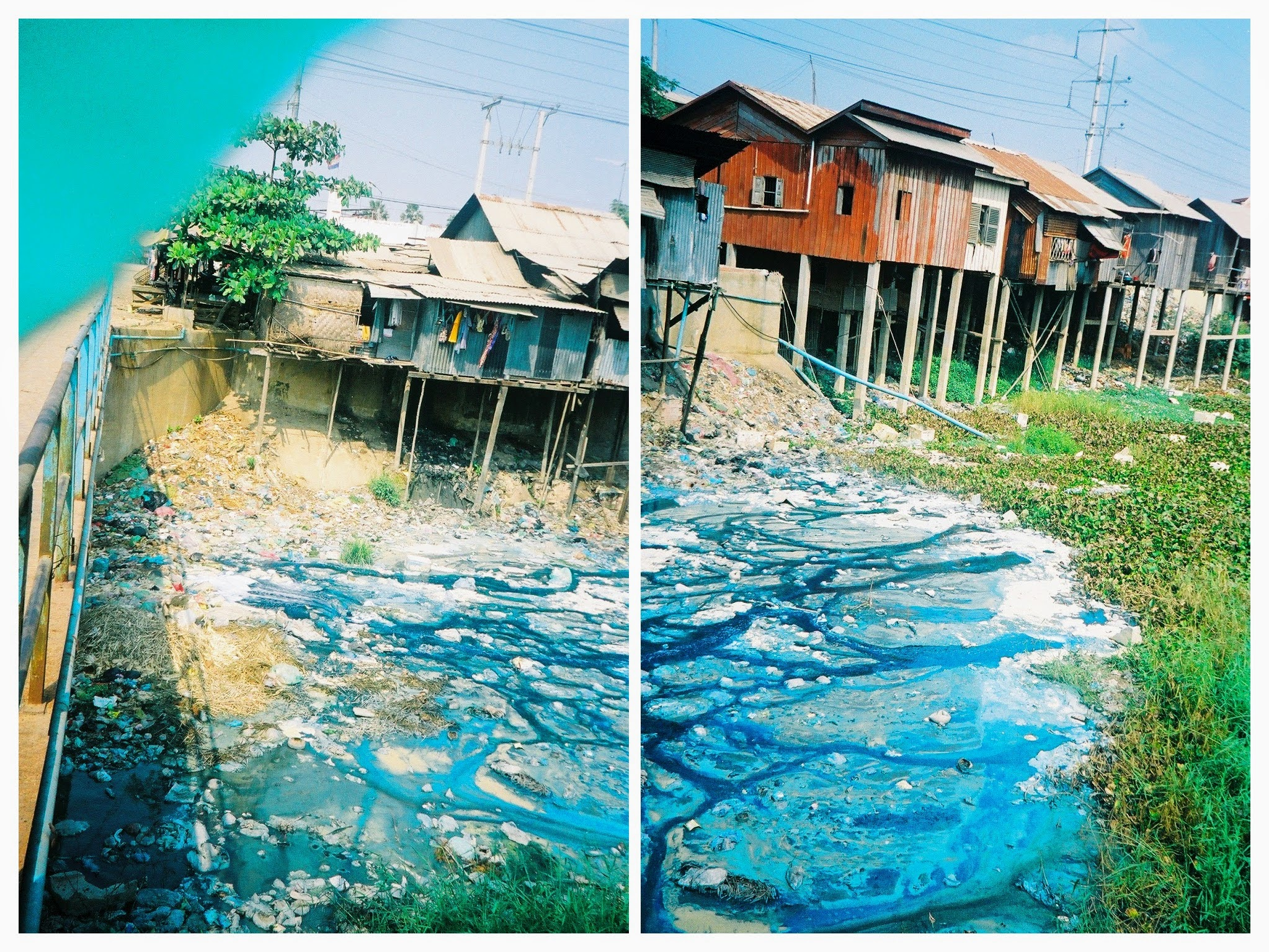
Indigo color water pollution in Phnom Penh, Cambodia, 2005

The textile industry is one of the largest polluters in the globalized world of mostly free market dominated socioeconomic systems. Chemically polluted textile wastewater degrades the quality of the soil and water. The pollution comes from the type of conduct of chemical treatments used e.g., in pretreatment, dyeing, printing, and finishing operations that many or most market-driven companies use despite "eco-friendly alternatives". Textile industry wastewater is considered to be one the largest polluters of water and soil ecosystems, causing "carcinogenic, mutagenic, genotoxic, cytotoxic and allergenic threats to living organisms". The textile industry uses over 8000 chemicals in its supply chain, also polluting the environment with large amounts of microplastics and has been identified in one review as the industry sector producing the largest amount of pollution.

A campaign of big clothing brands like Nike, Adidas and Puma to voluntarily reform their manufacturing supply chains to commit to achieving zero discharges of hazardous chemicals by 2020 (global goal) appears to have failed.

The textile industry also creates a lot of pollution that leads to externalities which can cause large economic problems. The problem usually occurs when there is no division of ownership rights. This means that the problem of pollution is largely caused because of incomplete information about which company pollutes and at what scale the damage was caused by the pollution.

== Worker health impacts ==
=== Chemical exposures ===
Within the textile industry, more than 8000 different chemicals may be used in the manufacturing process, many of which are toxic or nonbiodegradable. Some textile factory workers handle dangerous chemicals every day, leading to increased occupational risk of hearing disorders, dermatitis, and ophthalmological symptoms when not using protective measures. Additionally, an increase of miscarriages occurs when pregnant textile workers are exposed to natural and synthetic fibres. Other diseases can be caused by frequent hazardous chemical exposures.

==== Cancer risks ====
With increased exposure to toxic chemicals comes an increased risk of occupational cancer. Studies of textile workers have shown an increased risk of nasal, bladder and urinary cancers, which are thought to be related to the dyes that are used.

=== Physical hazards ===
==== Ergonomic hazards ====
When producing textiles, many repetitive physical movements are made by workers. From this, issues and pain can arise, particularly in textile sewing machine operators. Of these operators, many experienced lower back and neck pain. Other common pain areas reported were upper back, shoulders, and the hips and thighs. Additionally, 69% of the workers reported hard knuckles within the past 12 months, which occurs from scissor induced calluses.

==== Dust exposure ====
Various health effects occur when regularly exposed to dust without protective measures. Common dust related respiratory symptoms include cough, phlegm, shortness of breath, wheezing and chest pain. Respiratory disorder symptoms in textile workers not using personal protective equipment were 1,130 times more likely than their coworkers who used personal protective equipment and other protective measures. The study also found that when the amount of dust in the air was greater than the quality standard, workers were at a higher risk of having respiratory disorder symptoms. Fibre dust exposure has also been found to contribute to the risk of cancers, such as lung cancer. The inhalation of crystalline silica dust has also led workers to develop a lung disease called silicosis.

==== Noise exposure ====
High noise exposures have been observed in textile industries across countries, as well as high rates of occupational hearing loss.

==== Unsafe working conditions ====
Many textile workers work in extremely unsafe and unhygienic working conditions in sweatshops, including facing long hours with little days off, being exposed to dangerous chemicals, and facing harassment from superiors. Numerous workers have reportedly passed out due to extreme heat in their workplaces, and exhaustion. Further, many of these workplaces use child labor.

=== Women in the textile industry ===
Women make up a majority of the workers in the textile industry, making up around 60% of the workers of the garment industry. This means that mostly women are facing the negative consequences of working in this industry, such as the negative health impacts. In Asia alone, around 42 million women are employed in this industry. Women in this industry often face harassment, gender discrimination, verbal and physical abuse, and sexual exploitation from male superiors.

== See also ==
- Drapers and cloth merchants
- Textile industry in Bangladesh
- History of silk production in Lyon
- Textile recycling
