= 28th G8 summit =

2002 international leader meeting in Canada

28th G8 Summit

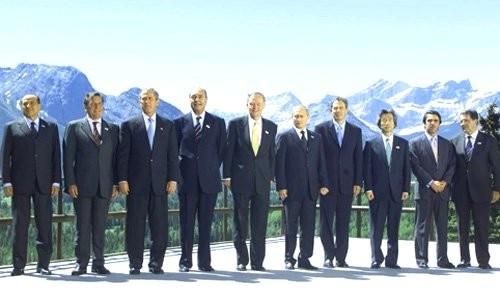
- family picture of leaders
- Host country: Canada
- Dates: June 26–27, 2002
- Cities: Kananaskis
- Venues: Kananaskis Resort
- Follows: 27th G8 summit
- Precedes: 29th G8 summit

The 28th G8 Summit was held in Kananaskis, Alberta, Canada, on June 26–27, 2002.

== Overview ==
The Group of Seven (G7) was an unofficial forum which brought together the heads of the richest industrialized countries: France, Germany, Italy, Japan, the United Kingdom, the United States, and Canada starting in 1976. The G8, meeting for the first time in 1997, was formed with the addition of Russia. In addition, the President of the European Commission has been formally included in summits since 1981. The summits were not meant to be linked formally with wider international institutions; and in fact, a mild rebellion against the stiff formality of other international meetings was a part of the genesis of cooperation between France's president Valéry Giscard d'Estaing and West Germany's chancellor Helmut Schmidt as they conceived the initial summit of the Group of Six (G6) in 1975.

The G8 summits during the 21st-century have inspired widespread debates, protests and demonstrations; and the two- or three-day event becomes more than the sum of its parts, elevating the participants, the issues and the venue as focal points for activist pressure.

== Accomplishments ==
The 2002 conference is said to have cost $300-million with potential benefits for the Kananaskis economy.

In response to and support of the New Partnership for Africa's Development (NEPAD), the Kananaskis Summit produced an African Action Plan, which contained commitments on promoting peace and security; strengthening institutions and governance; fostering trade, economic growth and sustainable development; implementing debt relief; expanding knowledge; improving health and confronting HIV/AIDS; increasing agricultural productivity; and, improving water resource management.

Canadian Prime Minister Jean Chrétien proposed and carried the Market Access Initiative, so that the then 48 least developed countries (LDCs) could profit from "trade-not-aid". This was part of a multi-year initiative by the Technical Cooperation Division at the Secretariat of the WTO, spearheaded by Dr. Chiedu Osakwe, the WTO Special Coordinator for the LDCs beginning in 1999. Concurrently, the WTO Agreement on Textiles and Clothing (ATC) resulted in the phasing out of apparel quotas under the Multi Fibre Arrangement (MFA) in 2005. Developing country quotas were subsequently removed on January 1, 2005, and tariff reduction was to continue until 2010.

Furthermore, the G8 Global Partnership Against the Spread of Weapons and Materials of Mass Destruction was adopted at the summit; with members committing US$20 billion towards the security of some weapons of mass destruction in former Soviet republics.

In the summit's final communique, one of the unexpected highlights was an announcement that Russia would become a true full member of the G8. This would be accomplished by allowing it to host its first G8 summit, starting in 2006. Thus, the rotation of the G8 Presidency was changed, placing Russia between the United Kingdom and Germany.

== Leaders at the summit ==
The G8 is an unofficial annual forum for the leaders of Canada, the European Commission, France, Germany, Italy, Japan, Russia, the United Kingdom, and the United States.

=== Participants ===
These participants were the "core members" of the international forum during the 28th summit:

**Core G8 members** Host state and leader are shown in bold text.
Member		Represented by	Title
(Canada)	**Canada**	**Jean Chrétien**	**Prime Minister**
(France)	France	Jacques Chirac	President
(Germany)	Germany	Gerhard Schröder	Chancellor
(Italy)	Italy	Silvio Berlusconi	Prime Minister
(Japan)	Japan	Junichiro Koizumi	Prime Minister
(Russia)	Russia	Vladimir Putin	President
(United Kingdom)	United Kingdom	Tony Blair	Prime Minister
(United States)	United States	George W. Bush	President
(European Union)	European Union	Romano Prodi	Commission President
(European Union)	European Union	José María Aznar	Council President
**Guest Invitees (Countries)**
Member		Represented by	Title
(Algeria)	Algeria	Abdelaziz Bouteflika	President
(Nigeria)	Nigeria	Olusegun Obasanjo	President
(Senegal)	Senegal	Abdoulaye Wade	President
(South Africa)	South Africa	Thabo Mbeki	President
**Guest Invitees (International Institutions)**
Member		Represented by	Title
(United Nations)	United Nations	Kofi Annan	Secretary-General

== Priorities ==
Traditionally, a host country of the G8 summit sets the agenda for negotiations, which take place primarily amongst multi-national civil servants in the weeks before the summit itself, leading to a joint declaration which all countries can agree to sign. The Presidency of the G8 is held by the leader of a current national government, whether it is a president, prime minister, or chancellor (with Germany) of that particular G8 country. It lasts from January 1 to December 31 of such year.

== Issues ==
The summit was intended as a venue for resolving differences among its members. As a practical matter, the summit was also conceived as an opportunity for its members to give each other mutual encouragement in the face of difficult economic decisions.

== Citizens' responses and authorities' counter-responses ==
The previous summit, the 27th G8 summit, in Genoa, Italy was the site of large anti-globalization protests and occasionally violent conflict between protesters and the police. In contrast to Genoa, most of the area near was closed to the public during the summit, and protesters were kept far away, mainly in Calgary. The protests were peaceful, attended by groups including the Raging Grannies.

Kananaskis was selected because of its isolated location. Security was augmented by CF-188 jet fighters, air-to-air refuelling aircraft and helicopters which patrolled the skies non-stop; all major thoroughfares were closed, many of the shops in nearby Calgary were boarded up, and police reportedly outnumbered protesters six to one. It was the largest peacetime security operation in Canadian history.

Security was very tight at the summit, costing taxpayers in excess of $200 million. It attracted thousands of protesters and security was provided by 5,000 to 7,000 police and military officers. Protests were described as largely peaceful. This was the first G-8 summit held after the September 11, 2001, attacks.

== Business opportunity ==
For some, the G8 summit became a profit-generating event; as for example, the official G8 Summit magazines which have been published under the auspices of the host nations for distribution to all attendees since 1998.

== Gallery of participating leaders ==
=== Core G8 participants ===
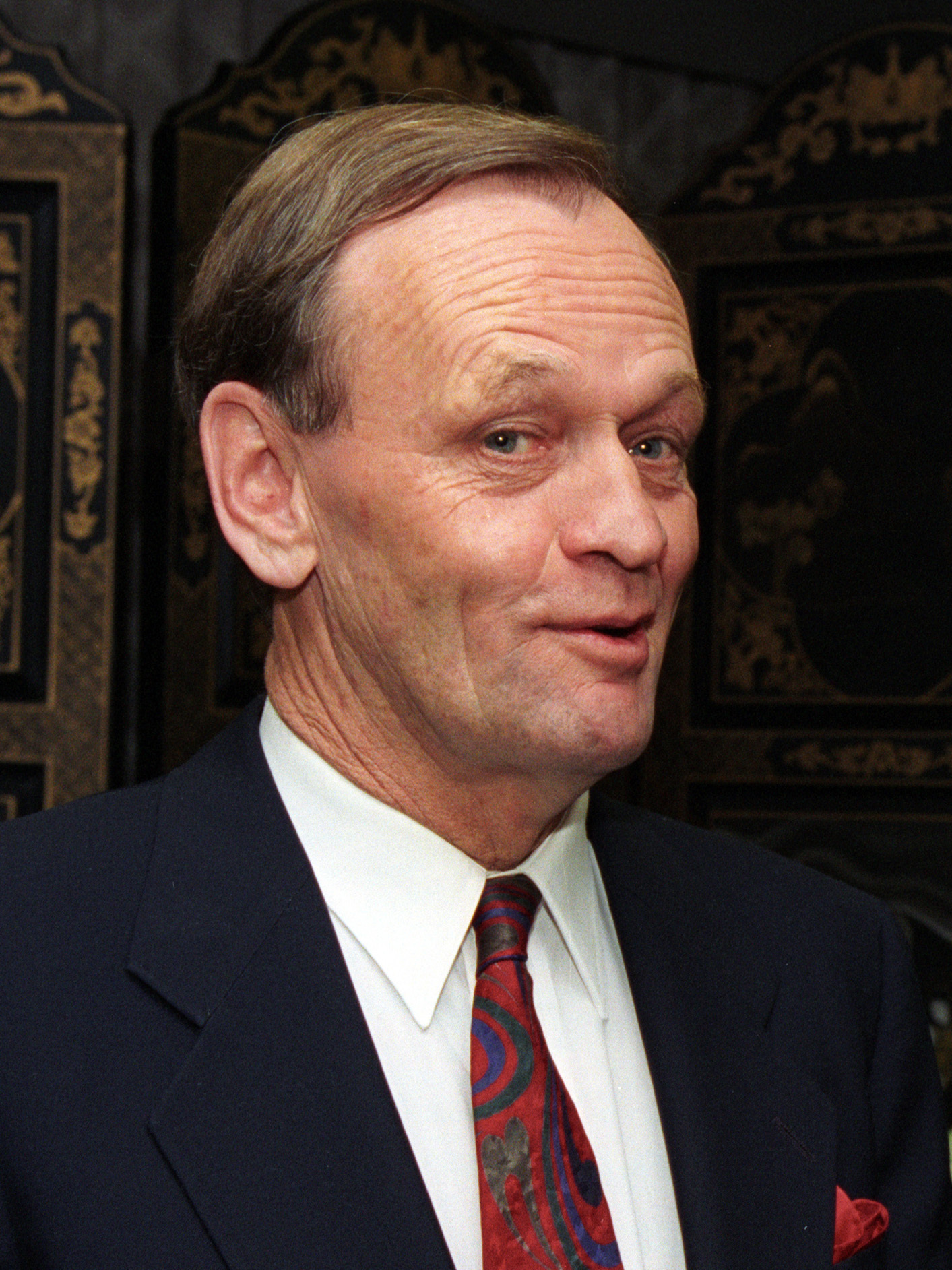
(Canada) Canada
Jean Chrétien,
Prime Minister (Host)

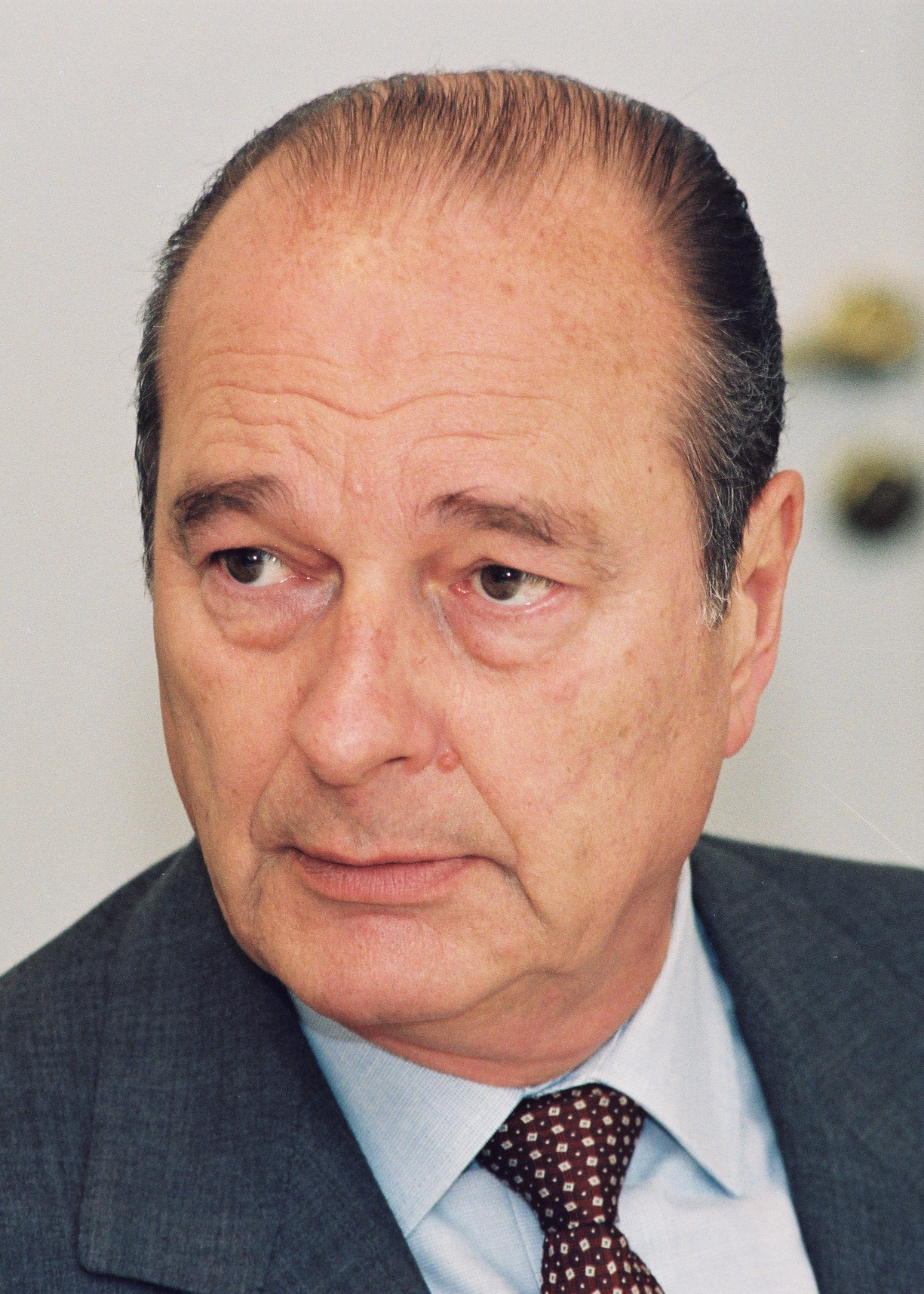
(France) France
Jacques Chirac,
President

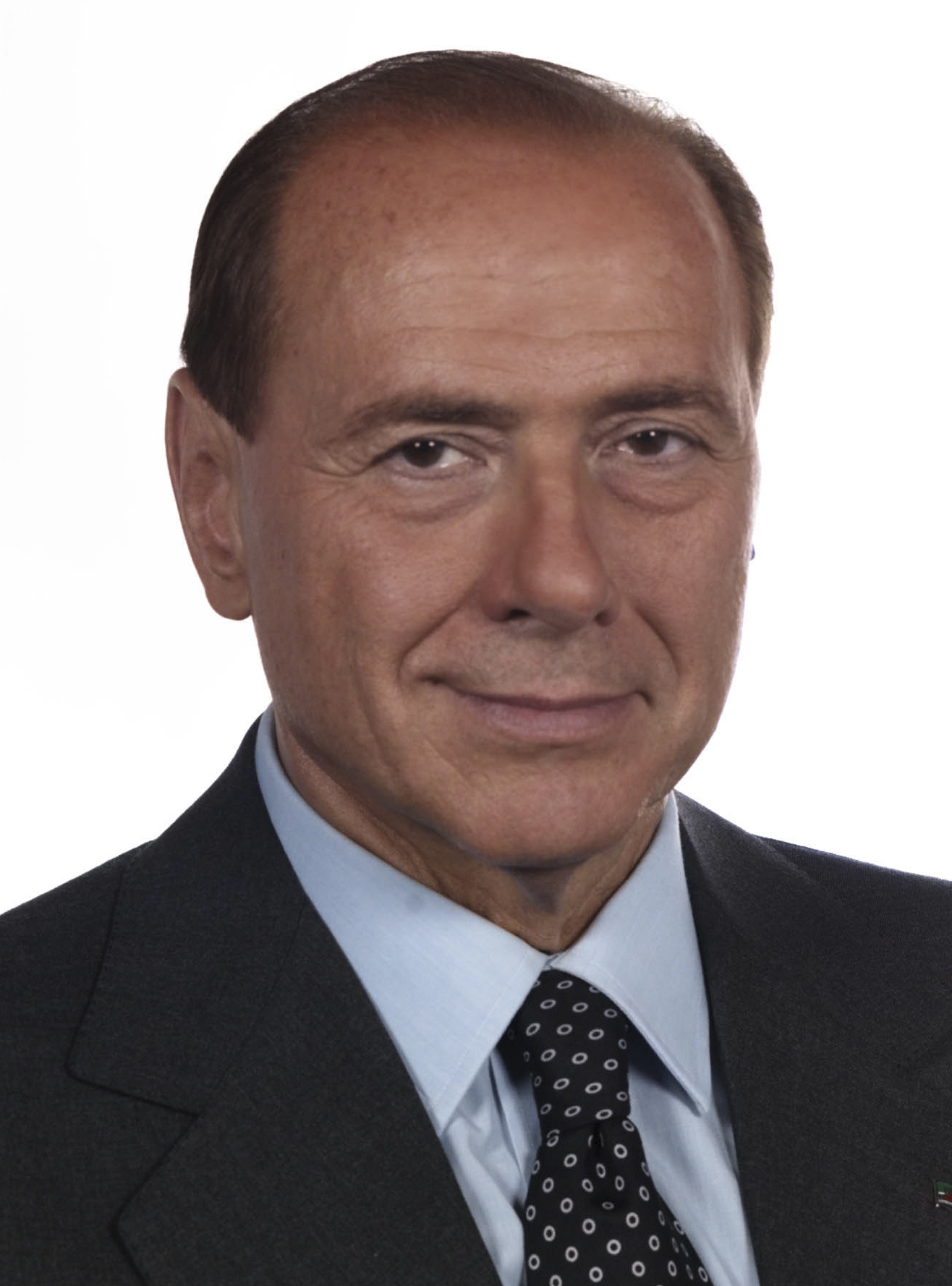
(Italy) Italy
Silvio Berlusconi,
Prime Minister

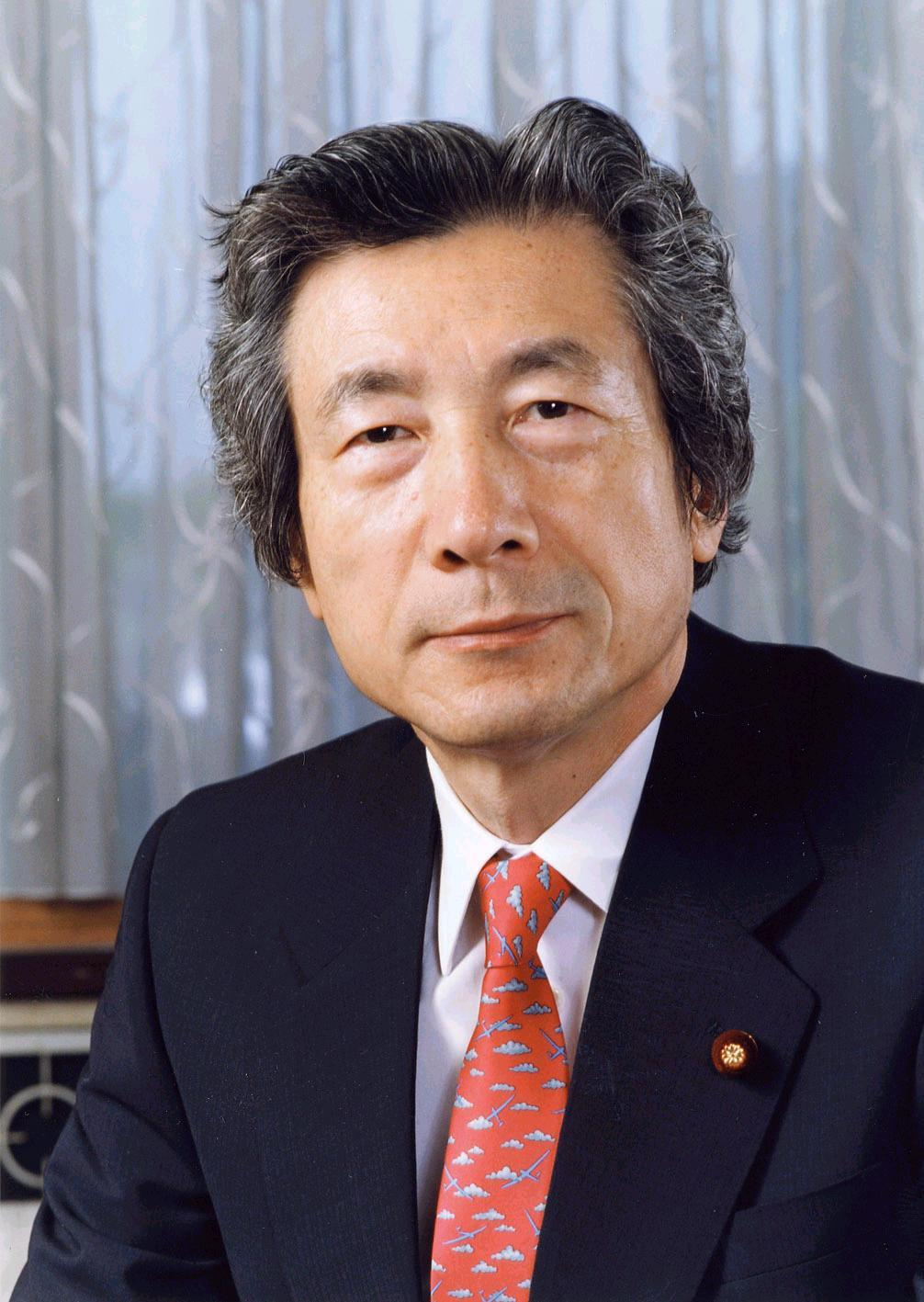
(Japan) Japan
Junichirō Koizumi,
Prime Minister

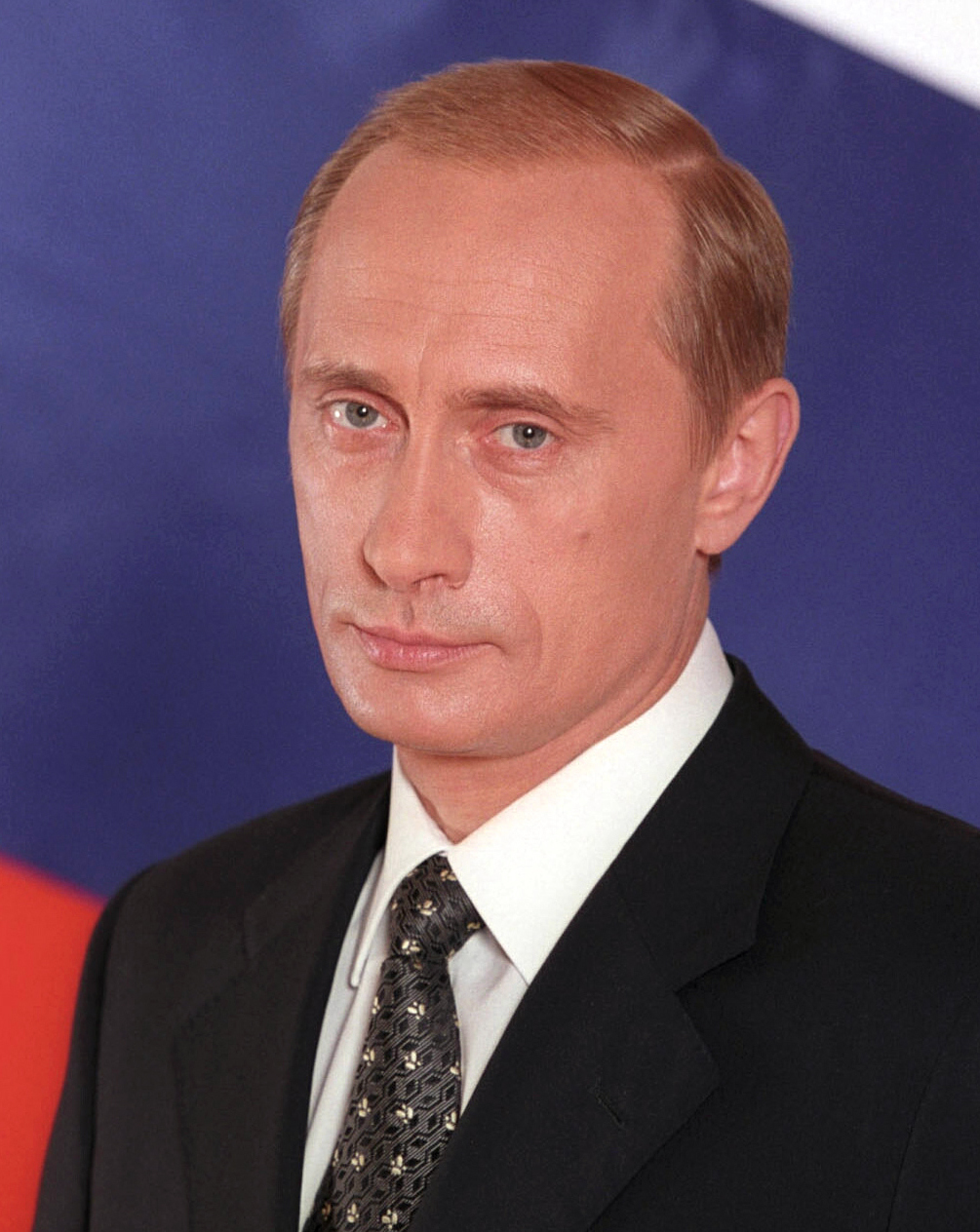
(Russia) Russia
Vladimir Putin,
President

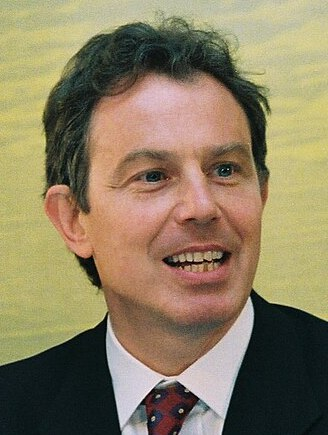
(United Kingdom) United Kingdom
Tony Blair,
Prime Minister

(United States) United States
George W. Bush,
President
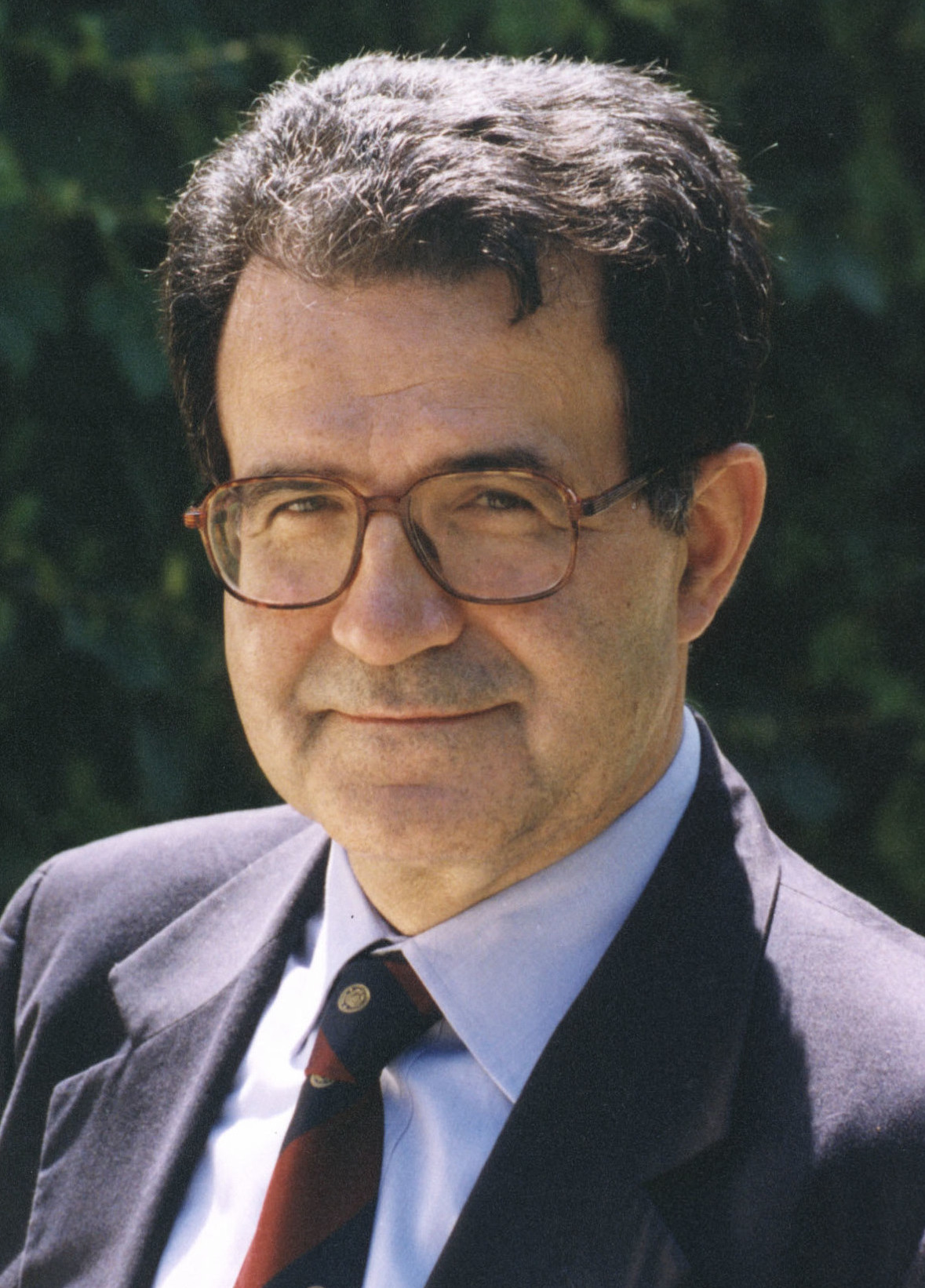
(European Union) European Union
Romano Prodi,
Commission President

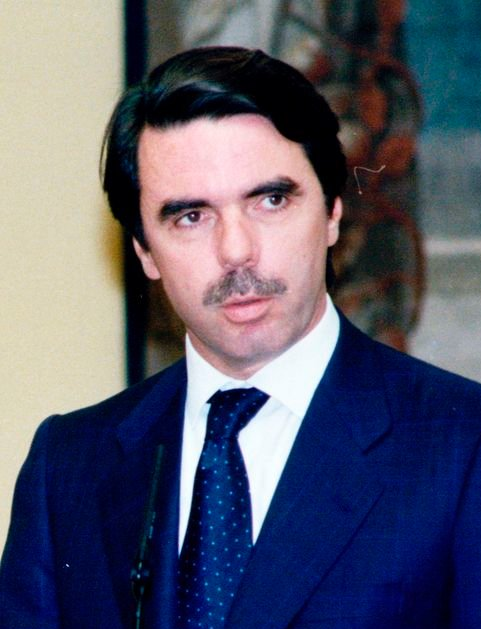
José Maria Aznar, Prime Minister of Spain and rotating Council President
