= Quota =

A quota is a threshold that specifies a desired or allowed quantity of something, often allocating a limited resource.

For some examples, see Category:Quotas, and the lists below:

== Maxima ==
- Import quota, a restriction on the quantity of goods that can be imported into a country
- Milk quota, a quota on milk production in Europe
- Catch share
  - Individual fishing quota, a quota on allowable catch
  - Common Fisheries Policy
- Disk quota, a limit that restricts disk file system usage in computing
- Numerus clausus

== Targets ==
- Market Sharing Quota, an economic system used in Canadian agriculture
- Quota 90

== Minima ==
- Electoral quota
  - Quotas in electoral systems
  - Quota rule, a requirement for systems of apportionment
  - Largest remainder methods
- Gender quota
- Ticket quota, directives by police departments for their officers to deliver a predetermined number of summons
- Quota Law, affirmative action in Brazil

== Varied ==
- Racial quota, numerical requirements for hiring, promoting, admitting or graduating members of a particular racial group

== See also ==
- Quotaism, the concept of organizing society around a quota system
- Quota Elimination
- Threshold (disambiguation)
