= LGBTQ rights in Rio Grande do Sul =

- Legal status: Legal since 1830, age of consent equalised
- Gender identity: Gender change allowed, official standard for altering legal sex doesn't require surgery since 2018
- Military: Allowed to serve openly
- Discrimination protections: Yes, since 2019

Family rights
- Recognition of relationships: Same-sex marriage since 2013
- Adoption: Legal since 2010

Lesbian, gay, bisexual, transgender and queer (LGBTQ) people in the Brazilian state of Rio Grande do Sul enjoy many of the same legal protections available to non-LGBTQ people. Homosexuality is legal in the state.

== Recognition of same-sex unions ==
On May 29, 2012, four of six notaries of the state capitol of Porto Alegre agreed to convert civil unions into marriages.

== Adoption and parenting ==
November 11, 2005 − the first LGBTQ adoption in Brazil, by a lesbian couple from the city of Bagé. The judge of the Childhood and Youth of Bagé, Marcos Danilo Edon Franco, permitted the adoption of two brothers by a lesbian couple. The women had been living in a stable union for seven years. One of them had been responsible for the guardianship of the boys since their birth.

April 6, 2006 − a second adoption by a lesbian couple, and one "provisional guardianship". Same-sex couples in committed relationships were allowed to register at any notary public office. Although it did not affect federal rights, it gave same-sex couples more equality in many areas. Same-sex couples who register have the right to jointly own property, establish custody of children, and claim the right to pensions and property when one partner dies.

June 10, 2009 − a lesbian couple was the first to win in court the right of adoption in the Brazilian State of Goiás. Since April 2008, a federal employee, 49, and a librarian, 34, had custody of a girl aged two years and ten months. The unprecedented decision was made by Judge Maurício Porfírio of the Juvenile Court of Childhood and Youth in Goiânia. To compensate for the lack of specific law on the issue, the magistrate relied on the precedent of the Court of Rio Grande do Sul.

April 27, 2010 − the Superior Court of Justice of Brazil, located in the capital of the country, Brasília, decided to approve LGBTQ adoption in Brazil. In the case, a lesbian couple from the city of Bagé the physiotherapist Lídia Brignol Guterres and the psychologist Luciana Reis Maidana, had their right to share the adoption of two sons recognized. They told the state that the decision could become a landmark, and could inspire others to follow suit. The physiotherapist and psychologist had been together for thirteen years and adopted two boys in 2002 and 2003. In official records, the children appeared only as children of Luciana. The couple decided to change the documentation to provide pension rights which apply to minors in cases of separation and inheritance.

June 3, 2011 - the Justice of the city of Pelotas authorized the adoption of a four-year-old child by a gay couple. The biological mother, gave evidence demonstrating a desire to give her child up for adoption by the gay couple.

== Discrimination protections ==
On December 19, 2002, the Legislative Assembly of Rio Grande do Sul enacted State Law No. 14,896, which prohibits discrimination based on sexual orientation.

Since 2019, discrimination based on gender identity has been prohibited nationwide in Brazil, through a decision by the Supreme Federal Court.

== Gender identity and expression ==
The Supreme Federal Court of Brazil ruled on 1 March 2018, that a transgender person has the right to change their official name and sex without the need of surgery or professional evaluation, just by self-declaration of their psychosocial identity.

On January 29, 2020—National Trans Visibility Day—the government of Rio Grande do Sul installed signs in the women's restrooms of state government offices stating that the facilities could be used in accordance with gender identity, in addition to installing unisex restrooms. In August 2021, Special Secretary of Culture Mário Frias criticized the measures, claiming they posed risks to children using the restrooms.

On April 22, 2022, Rio Grande do Sul Justice assured non-binary people to change their first name and sex in their birth record, according to their self-perceived identity, regardless of judicial authorization, allowing include the expression "non-binary" in the sex field upon a request made by the interested party to a notary's office. However, in December 2023, the Court of Justice of Rio Grande do Sul revoked the provision that recognized non-binary rectification in the state.

On September 28, 2025, a court in Porto Alegre ordered a bar to pay 10,000 reais in compensation after denying a trans man access to the men's restroom. On May 28, 2026, the decision was overturned by an appellate court.

On July 3, 2026, Governor Eduardo Leite signed a law allowing trans people to use their chosen name (social name) on their death certificates.

=== Transgender quotas ===
On December 6, 2021, the governor of Rio Grande do Sul, Eduardo Leite, signed a decree establishing quotas for trans people in state-level public service entrance exams.

On October 7, 2022, the rector of the Federal University of Rio Grande, Danilo Giroldo, signed a resolution to establish quotas for trans people. On February 27, 2023, the 2nd Federal Court of Rio Grande issued an injunction striking down the resolution. On March 3, 2023, the Regional Federal Court of the 4th Region overturned the injunction and authorized the university to resume the quotas.

On July 25, 2025, Judge Gessiel Pinheiro de Paiva, of the 2nd Federal Court of Rio Grande, struck down the university's resolution. Paiva stated that the resolution violated the Quota Law. On August 5, 2025, the university filed an appeal with the Regional Federal Court of the 4th Region, which ruled in the university's favor on October 28, 2025. The Court declared that universities possess the autonomy to create affirmative action policies.

On August 6, 2025, the Porto Alegre City Council approved, by a vote of 17–11, a bill introduced by Councilwoman Natasha Ferreira (PT) to establish quotas for transgender individuals in the city’s public service entrance examinations, reserving 1% of the positions for trans people. On September 24, 2025, the bill was enacted by the Speaker of the City Council, Comandante Nádia (PL), after Mayor Sebastião Melo neither signed it into law nor exercised his veto.

On December 12, 2025, the Public Prosecutor's Office of Rio Grande do Sul filed a lawsuit against the municipal government, seeking to ensure the enforcement of the law, following a complaint lodged by Natasha Ferreira. In response, that same month, the Porto Alegre city government issued decrees to bring the public competitive examination notices into compliance with the law’s quota requirements.

== Education ==
On May 4, 2022, the Porto Alegre City Council approved, by a vote of 20-11, a bill to prohibit the use of gender-neutral language in the city's schools. The bill was signed into law by the city's mayor, Sebastião Melo (MDB), on June 15, 2022, and published in the Official Gazette on the 17th.

On April 24, 2025, the Supreme Federal Court struck down the city law, along with similar laws from São Gonçalo and Muriaé.

== Summary table ==
Same-sex sexual activity legal	Yes (Since 1830)
Equal age of consent	Yes (Since 1830)
Anti-discrimination laws in employment only	Yes (Since 2002 for sexual orientation; Since 2019 for gender identity)
Anti-discrimination laws in the provision of goods and services	Yes (Since 2002 for sexual orientation; Since 2019 for gender identity)
Anti-discrimination laws in all other areas (Incl. indirect discrimination, hate speech)	Yes (Since 2002 for sexual orientation; Since 2019 for gender identity)
Same-sex marriages	Yes (Since 2013)
Recognition of same-sex couples	Yes (Since 2011)
Stepchild adoption by same-sex couples	Yes (Officially permitted since 2010)
Joint adoption by same-sex couples	Yes (Officially permitted since 2010)
LGBTQ people allowed to serve openly in the military	Yes
Right to change legal gender	Yes (Since 2008; gender self-identification since 2018)
Third gender option	No (From 2022 to 2023)
Conversion therapy by medical professionals banned	Yes (Since 1999 for homosexuals and since 2018 for transgender people)
Access to IVF for lesbians	Yes (Since 2013)
Commercial surrogacy for gay male couples	No (Banned for any couple regardless of sexual orientation)
MSMs allowed to donate blood	Yes (Since 2020)
