= Quota Elimination =

Initiative to eliminate the use of trade quotas between WTO nations

Quota Elimination is an initiative to eliminate the use of quotas in all textile and clothing trade between nations which are members of the World Trade Organization (WTO). Doing so was one of the key commitments undertaken at the WTO Uruguay Round in 1994 to retire the Multi Fibre Arrangement. The ATC, that is the WTO Agreement on Textile and Clothing, is the regulation governing textile and clothing and implements this commitment.

The agreement established a ten-year period which would eliminate the use of quotas in all textile and clothing trade between WTO nations. It expired on December 31, 2004. As of January 1, 2005, the garment and fabric trade worldwide is operating without quotas. To ensure the respect of bilateral textile agreements, goods shipped prior to January 1, 2005 and subject to the 2004 quotas will be subject to the import regime of 2004 even if they are presented to customs after January 1.

To avoid excessive burdens on trade and customs, as of April 1, 2005, all garments and fabrics will trade freely into the European Union (EU). Although the quotas have been eliminated, the regulation also sets up a statistical monitoring system for the imports of textiles and clothing into the EU. This system is to provide information regarding the chance of market disruptions and will allow for the governing body to closely follow the trade in this new environment. This regulation is beneficial for Canadian clothing and fabric manufacturers because now there are fewer restrictions. It is hoped by some that this ruling will open up the European market in the near future. Benefits of the abolition of quotas are also expected to textile companies in India and Pakistan.
