= Multi Fibre Arrangement =

Former system of textile export quotas

The Multi Fibre Arrangement (MFA) governed the world trade in textiles and garments from 1974 through 1994, imposing quotas on the amount developing countries could export to developed countries. Its successor, the Agreement on Textiles and Clothing (ATC), expired on 1 January 2005.

== History ==
Since the (re)emergence of developing countries as a source of cotton textiles, production from these countries steadily increased after colonial independence. A number of treaties concerning Short-Term Arrangements regarding International Trade in Cotton Textiles (Geneva, 21 July 1961); Long-Term Arrangement regarding International Trade in Cotton Textiles (Geneva, 9 February 1962 and 15 June 1970), and Arrangement regarding International Trade in Textiles (Geneva, 20 December 1973) established trade rules in textiles. Eventually, the Multi Fibre Agreement was established in 1974.

== Impact ==
The MFA was introduced in 1974 as a short-term measure intended to allow developed countries to adjust to imports from the developing world.

At the General Agreement on Tariffs and Trade (GATT) Uruguay Round, it was decided to bring the textile trade under the jurisdiction of the World Trade Organization. The Agreement on Textiles and Clothing provided for the gradual dismantling of the quotas that existed under the MFA. This process was completed on 1 January 2005. However, large tariffs remained in place on many textile products.

Bangladesh was expected to suffer the most from the ending of the MFA, as it was expected to face more competition, particularly from China. However, this was not the case. It turns out that even in the face of other economic giants, Bangladesh's labor is "cheaper than anywhere else in the world." While some smaller factories were documented making pay cuts and layoffs, most downsizing was essentially speculative – the orders for goods kept coming even after the MFA expired. In fact, Bangladesh's exports increased in value by about $500 million in 2006.

== See also ==
- Quota Elimination
- Outward Processing Arrangement
