= Quota Law =

Brazilian affirmative action law

Law No. 12.711/2012 (Brazilian Portuguese: Lei nº 12.711/2012), popularly known as the Quota Law (Brazilian Portuguese: Lei de Cotas) is a Brazilian law enacted on August 29, 2012, by President Dilma Rousseff. The law establishes an extensive affirmative action program in Brazilian education, guaranteeing that 50% of enrollments per course and shift in Federal Universities and Federal Institutes are reserved for students from public schools, low-income families, those with disabilities, or those belonging to ethnic minorities. It also guarantees a portion of these places for members of ethnic minorities. The remaining 50% of places remain open to general admission.

== Background ==
In the final years of Fernando Henrique Cardoso's presidency (PSDB), the implementation of quotas in public universities throughout Brazil began.

The State University of Rio de Janeiro was a pioneer in creating quotas for admission to higher education. Among federal universities, the University of Brasília, the Federal University of Pará and the Federal University of Rio Grande do Sul were the first to implement this policy. The quota policy at the University of Brasília prompted a ruling by the Supreme Federal Court in 2012, which decided on the constitutionality of quotas. On August 29th, the Quota Law was signed into law by President Dilma Rousseff.

== Implementation ==
=== Distribution of vacancies ===
Diagram showing the distribution of vacancies according to the original Quota Law.

Combining economic and ethnic factors, the quota law established a distribution of vacancies in federal universities and institutes according to the following parameters:

- 50% of the vacancies in each course and each modality are reserved for graduates of public education (candidates must have completed all of their primary or secondary education in public schools to be eligible for quotas);
- The vacancies reserved for quotas are then subdivided — half for students from public schools with a gross family income equal to or less than one and a half minimum wages per capita and half for students from public schools with a family income greater than one and a half minimum wages.
- Next, all these vacancies are subdivided again, allocating portions of the places to Black, Pardo, or Indigenous students, according to a minimum percentage corresponding to the sum of the representation of these groups in the institution's federative unit, according to the latest demographic census of the Brazilian Institute of Geography and Statistics (IBGE).

At the end of all these divisions, nine categories emerge that students can compete in, one being for general admission and eight for quotas.

These measures were gradually implemented in Brazilian Federal Universities and Institutes, with a certain degree of autonomy for the institutions, which can increase the scope of quotas or include other affirmative action measures.

=== Revisions and additions ===
==== People with disabilities ====
In 2016, President Michel Temer sanctioned Law 13.409/2016, expanding quotas for people with disabilities. This subdivision follows the proportion of people with disabilities in each state of the federation, according to the latest IBGE census.

==== 2023 Review ====
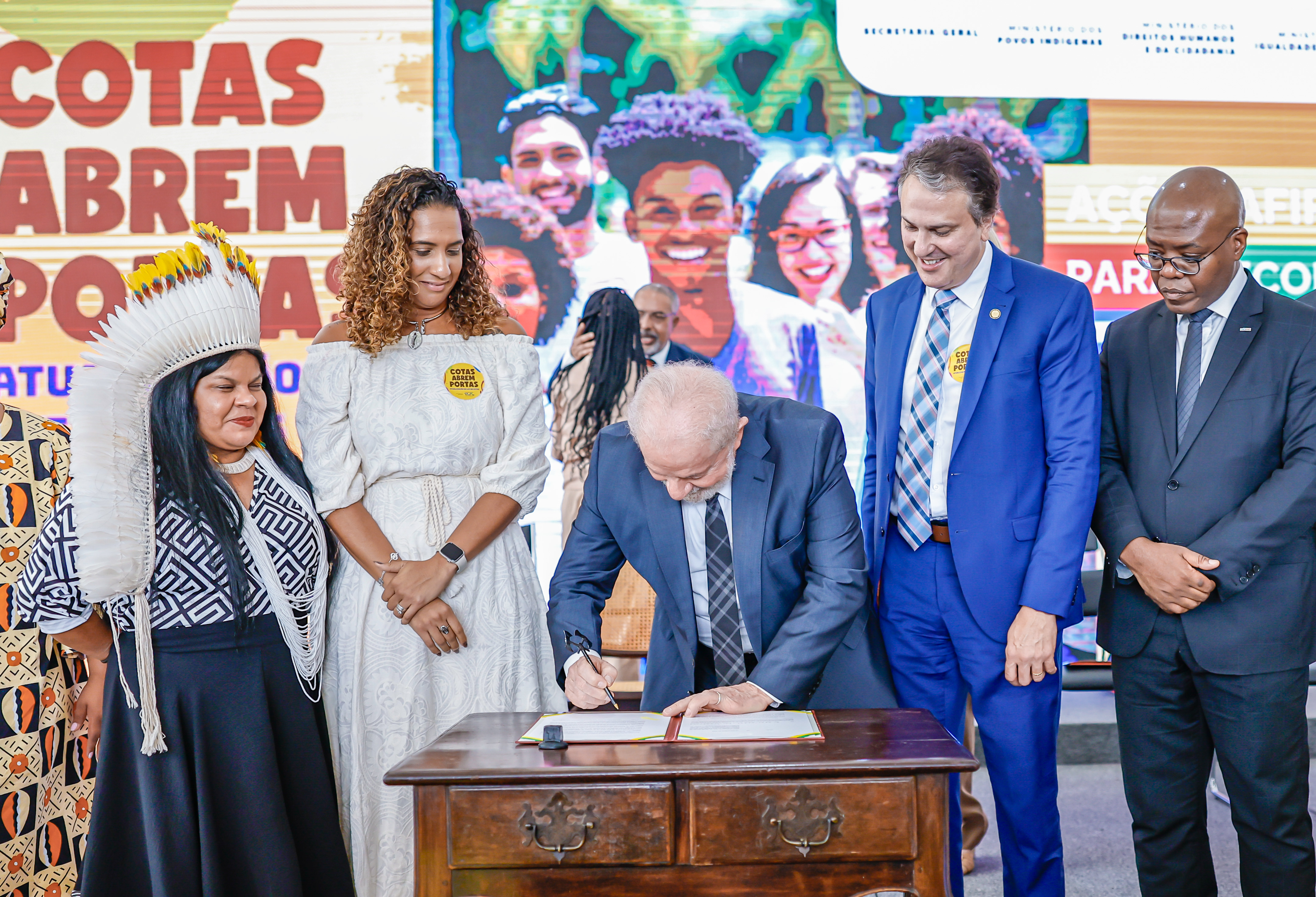
Presidential approval by Luiz Inácio Lula da Silva for the renewal of the law in 2023.

Bill No. 5384, initially proposed in December 2020 and presented by Maria do Rosário, updates the Quota Law, amending Law 12.711/2012. After discussions among parliamentarians, the bill was amended, and new deputies joined as authors. The final text was approved by the Chamber of Deputies on August 9, 2023, reported by CongresswomanDandara Tonantzin. The bill went to the Federal Senate, where it was reported by Senator Paulo Paim and approved on October 24, 2023. The text then went to the President for sanction, and was approved by President Luiz Inácio Lula da Silva on November 13, 2023, one day after the National High School Examination.

The Quota Law underwent the following changes:

- The groups that benefit include quilombolas, along with Black, Pardo, Indigenous, and disabled people;
- Potential quota applicants first compete for general admission spots, only taking up a place in the quota system if they do not obtain a spot "naturally";
- The limit for low-income reserves is changed to up to 1 minimum wage per capita (lowering the limit, which was previously 1.5 minimum wages).

The changes are already in effect for the 2024 edition of the Unified Selection System.

==== Racial self-identification commissions ====
Since the implementation of the Law, many complaints of fraud in racial quotas have accumulated. Thus, racial self-identification commissions (also known as racial tribunals) were established, processes in which panels, usually formed by faculty members, evaluate the phenotypes of potential quota holders in order to ensure that the social perception of the individual in question is equivalent to their self-declared race. These are frequently criticized for their subjectivity and imprecision.

== Effects ==
Since its establishment, the Quota Law has dramatically increased the scope of affirmative action in Brazilian universities. It has also caused great diversification in the student body, which was previously dominated by White graduates from private schools.

Some studies at universities indicate that, contrary to common expectations, there is no great disparity between the academic performance of quota students and non-quota students (although the difference is slightly greater when racial quota students are considered separately).

== Public opinion ==
The enactment of the Quota Law was an extremely controversial process and much debated in Brazilian society.

=== Support ===
The justifications for the law are often based on appeals for social inclusion and a correction of racism and social inequality in Brazil.

In 2021, a survey by the Poder360 website indicated an approval rating of around 60% for racial quotas among the Brazilian population, a percentage consistent with that of a previous survey by the institute. A 2023 survey by the Datafolha institute found an approval rating of around 50%.

=== Oppose ===
Beyond the general debates about the morality and effectiveness of affirmative action, critics of the measure argued that quotas in universities are a wrong and illusory way to combat inequality, claiming that changes should be focused on basic education, the "true source of disparities."

Racial quotas established by law are also considered unconstitutional by some critics, who argue that they are a form of "positive discrimination," asserting that the Brazilian Constitution prohibits any type of exclusion based on race or ethnicity.

== See also ==
- Racial quota
- Education in Brazil
