= Agreement on Textiles and Clothing =

Former system of textile export quotas

The Agreement on Textiles and Clothing (ATC) succeeded the Multi Fibre Arrangement (MFA), and facilitated the gradual dismantling of quotas for world textile trade that the MFA had put into place. Thus, the Agreement on Textiles and Clothing (ATC) stipulated a systematic and progressive elimination of the Multi Fiber Arrangement (MFA) over a span of ten years. This process culminated on 1 January 2005.

Under the MFA, quotas were imposed on the export of textiles and garments from developing countries to developed nations from 1974 to 1994.

== Background ==
Prior to 1939, there were no records of restrictions on the import of cotton textiles. However, following the Second World War, limitations on cotton textiles imports were first imposed through voluntary export restraints. Both the United States and United Kingdom adopted this approach. Despite certain West European countries easing their balance-of-payments restrictions in 1958, they still maintained unwarranted restrictions on the import of cotton textiles from specific origins. Eventually, these were referred to as "residual restrictions" within the context of the General Agreement on Tariffs and Trade (GATT).

Throughout the post-World War II era, there has been a distinct system in place governing international textile trade, which operates independently from standard multilateral trade regulations. The Agreement on Textiles and Clothing (ATC) was the outcome of negotiations during the Uruguay Round of Trade Negotiations. It superseded the Arrangement Regarding International Trade in Textiles (Multi-Fibre Arrangement, or MFA), which had been established on 20 December 1973. The MFA was written specifically to control rapid changes in the textile trade. Textile products were among the most labor-intensive to make and easily shipped.

Following the expiration of the ten-year transition period of ATC implementation, trade in textile and clothing products ceased to be subject to quotas under a special regime outside the normal World Trade Organization/General Agreement on Tariffs and Trade rules. From this point onward, textile trade came under the governance of the general rules and disciplines embedded in the multilateral trading system.

=== Quota system ===
In the quota system, the fundamental unit was known as the restraint category or quota category. These categories were defined as consolidated subgroups of textile and apparel products that shared specific characteristics or raw materials. In addition to imposing comprehensive restrictions on imports from designated suppliers, this system also distributed market share among these suppliers through the implementation of country-specific quotas.

== Aftermath ==
On January 1, 2005, the Agreement on Textiles and Clothing (ATC) and all the restrictions associated with it came to an end. This marked the conclusion of the ten-year period during which the ATC was put into practice. As a result, the trade in textile and clothing products was no longer limited based on special rules outside of the regular rules of the World Trade Organization (WTO) and the General Agreement on Tariffs and Trade (GATT). Instead, it now adhered to the general rules and regulations of the global trading system.

In international trade, market access allows companies to sell goods and services in foreign markets, subject to conditions like tariffs or quotas. It is a more attainable goal in trade negotiations than achieving completely barrier-free trade.

Abolition of quota restrictions created vast opportunities for export expansion from developing countries, especially China, India, and Pakistan, which were the most likely to benefit. Given the scale and competitive nature of China's manufacturing sector, numerous studies forecasted that China, and to a lesser extent India, would exert dominance over global markets in the post-quota era. In the liberalized categories, imports from China to the EU saw a near doubling in value during the initial three quarters of 2005, with an even steeper rise in volume due to substantial unit price declines. Chinese imports predominantly substituted exports from other developing nations, leaving the overall import value relatively stable. Between 2004 and 2005, United States imports exhibited a value surge of over 50 percent, while China's market share in textiles and clothing grew from 20 to 28 percent.

The ATC also had a significant impact on manufacturing countries. For instance, in Canada, which used quotas to protect its manufacturers from cheaper goods from developing countries, the ATC's tariff and quota reductions led to the closure of many local plants and layoffs of workers in Winnipeg. Some companies relocated to countries with lower labor costs like Guatemala, Mexico, Bangladesh, and China. In the United States, following the termination of the Agreement on Textiles and Clothing the textile industry has tended to be concentrated in certain regions, such as Los Angeles.

=== Market access ===
Various types of market access arrangements exist (including PTA, FTA, CECA, CEPA, Customs Union, Common Market, TIFA, BIT, and others), each characterized by its unique implementation framework and scope. Trade agreements can offer preferential market access, leading to diverse economic benefits such as trade creation, market expansion, capital accumulation, and improved productivity. A Free trade agreement (FTA) is an international deal between cooperating states to form a free-trade area. There are two types: bilateral agreements involve two countries easing trade restrictions for business expansion, while multilateral agreements involve three or more countries, and are more challenging to negotiate. FTAs play a pivotal role in fostering export growth for the exporting countries.
