= LGBTQ culture in Brazil =

LGBTQ culture in Brazil encompasses the various artistic, social, and leisure activities in the country focused on the participation of LGBTQ people.

== Cinema ==
Pornochanchadas were films that became popular in the 1970s and 80s; they were erotic comedies with homosexual themes. These films portrayed LGBTQ characters as stereotypes, associating them with a lower status and giving them lifeless scripts that displayed a false effeminate nature.

In 1994, the film Morango e Chocolate, directed by Arnaldo Jabor, premiered in Brazil and had a significant impact on the LGBTQ community. The story features a gay protagonist named Diego who shares a friendship with David. Some press reviews interpreted the relationship between the main characters as a friendship, but the director sought to show that two men can love each other beyond that.

In Brazilian cinema, according to an analysis by film professor Antonio Moreno of films released between 1923 and 1996, an homosexual character is portrayed as politically alienated, aggressive, often with exaggerated feminine gestures, incapable of monogamous relationships, inclined towards solitude, and resorting to paid partners. He is rarely the protagonist, which contributes to reinforcing the negative stereotype of Brazilian gay men.

== Literature ==
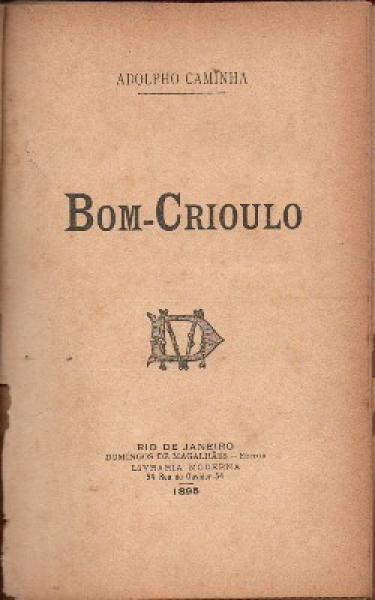
Cover of the first edition of the novel Bom-Crioulo (1895), considered the initiating work of Brazilian LGBT literature.

LGBTQ literature in Brazil has a tradition dating back to the 17th century, when the poet Gregório de Matos wrote satirical poems with homosexual references. However, the first narrative works that addressed homosexuality more directly appeared in the 1870s and 1880s with writers such as Joaquim Manuel de Macedo, Aluísio Azevedo, and Raul Pompéia, although these works often presented negative stereotypes about homosexuality.

Adolfo Caminha's novel Bom-Crioulo (1895) is considered the first LGBTQ novel in Latin America and marked a milestone in Brazilian literature by focusing on a same-sex relationship. Throughout the 20th century, Brazilian gay literature often portrayed its gay characters in a caricatured and exoticized way and depicted stereotypical roles in relationships, with one man being strong and masculine and the other weaker and submissive.

In the first decades of the 21st century, there was a normalization and increase in the representation of LGBTQ characters in Brazilian literature, with authors challenging existing stereotypes. Authors such as Natalia Borges Polesso, Victor Heringer, Tobias Carvalho, and Cristina Judar have gained recognition for their LGBTQ works in recent decades.

In poetry, Gregório de Matos was one of the first poets to make references to homosexuality in his work. In the 19th century, Álvares de Azevedo wrote poems that some consider homoerotic. In the 20th century, Mário de Andrade also addressed homoerotic themes in his poetry.

In the 21st century, Angélica Freitas has distinguished herself as an important LGBTQ poet in Brazil, and authors such as Tatiana Nascimento, Rafael João, Luciany Aparecida, and others have also contributed to LGBTQ literature. LGBTQ young adult literature has also gained popularity in Brazil in recent years, with authors such as Víctor Martins, Lucas Rocha, and others addressing LGBTQ themes in their novels.

== Museums ==
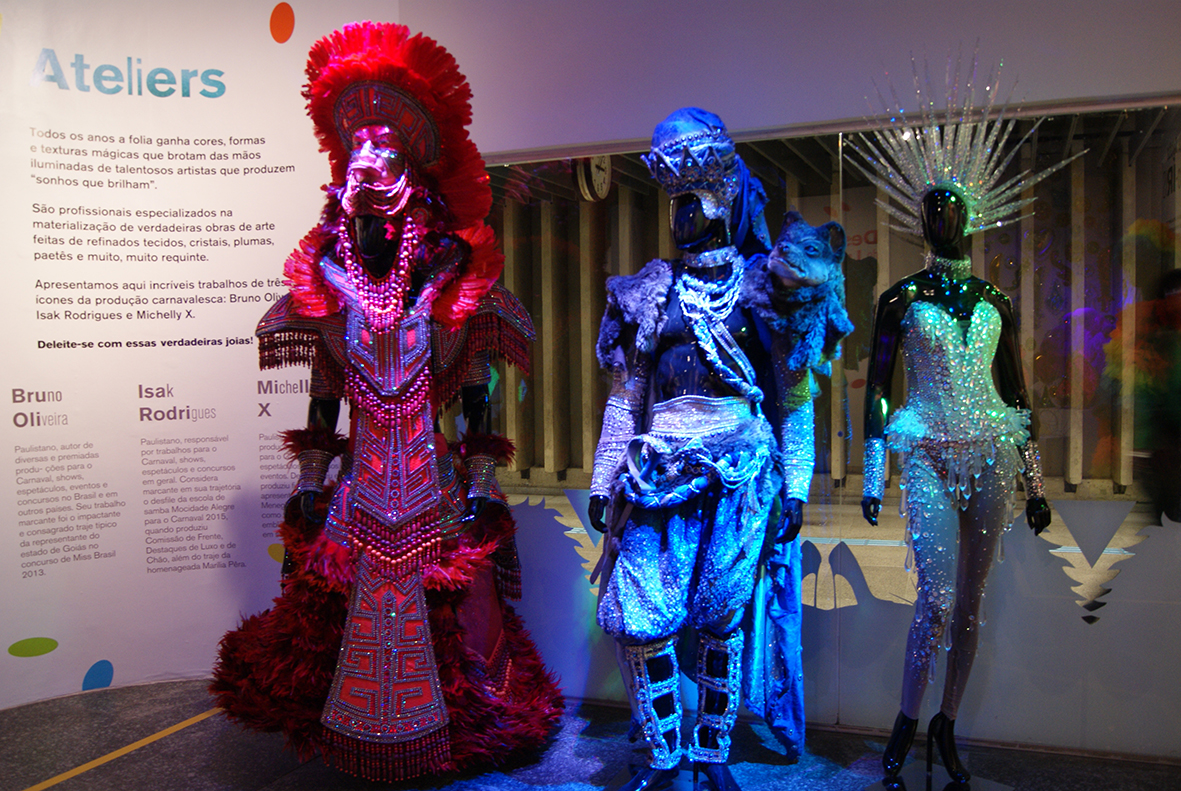
Exhibition at the Sexual Diversity Museum

The Sexual Diversity Museum (MDS), founded in May 2012 by the Secretariat of Culture and Creative Economy of São Paulo to promote LGBTQ culture in Brazil, exhibits temporary and traveling works that explore sexual and gender diversity through images, photographs, objects, and videos created by artists. It is the first museum of its kind in Latin America, focused on preserving LGBTQ history and culture.

Despite facing challenges, such as legal issues that led to its temporary closure in 2022, the museum reopened in September of the same year and plans to expand. Located in the República metro station, the MDS is a non-profit organization committed to preserving and disseminating the social, political, and cultural heritage of the LGBTQ community through dynamic exhibitions covering various themes.

== Music ==
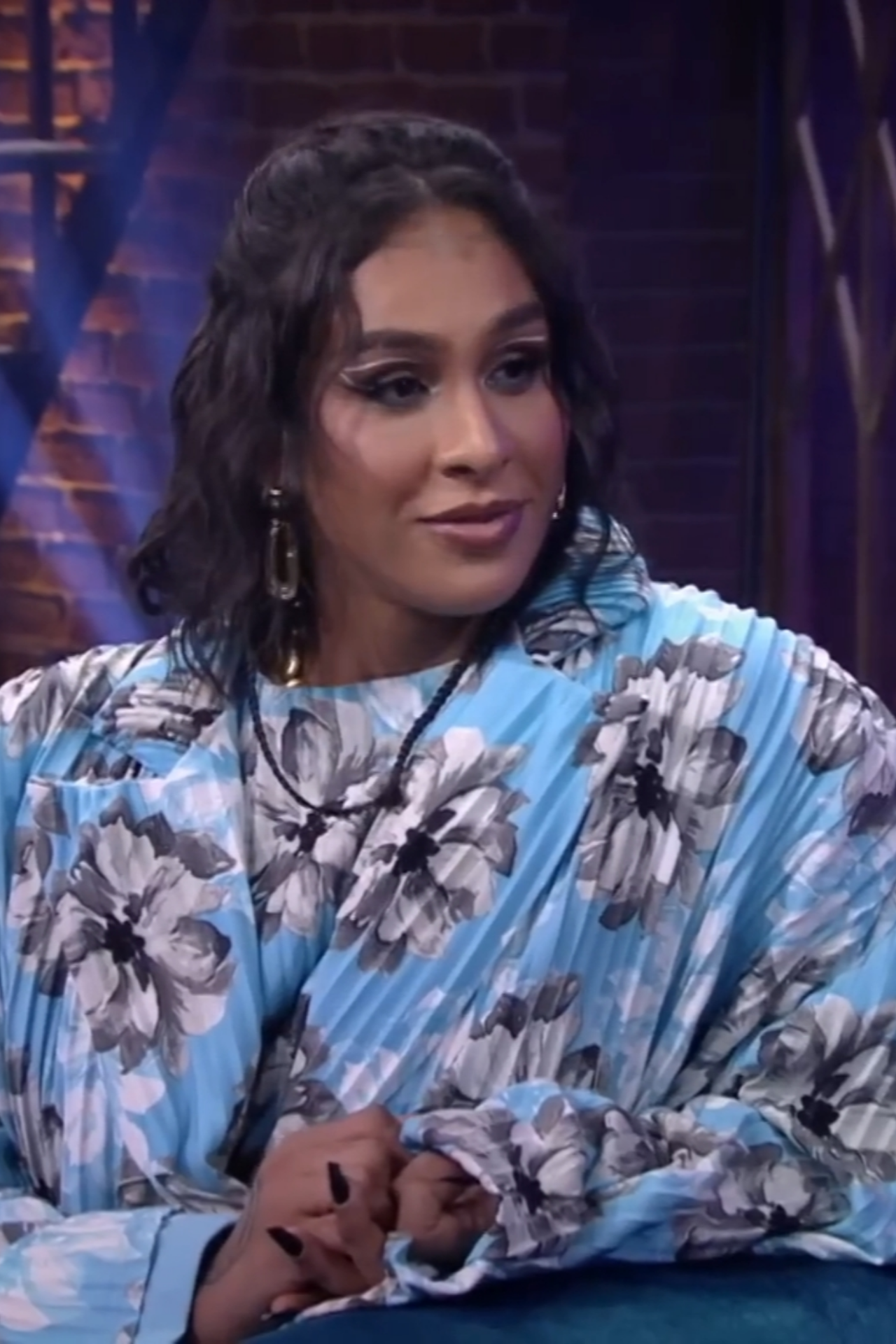
Linn da Quebrada in Lady Night in 2022

In the 1970s, Ney Matogrosso emerged as an influential musical figure in Brazil by challenging gender conventions and social restrictions during the military dictatorship. His role in the rock band Secos & Molhados, founded in 1971, fueled a musical and sexual revolution in the country. The band is known for its androgynous and theatrical aesthetic.

From the mid-2010s onwards, there was a notable emergence of LGBTQ artists, including Liniker, Pabllo Vittar, and Linn da Quebrada, who have challenged conventions of gender and sexuality. The emergence of the LGBTQ music scene in Brazil and its impact on culture and society was fostered by artists who have occupied media and artistic spaces.

Although their visibility has led to greater awareness and acceptance in society, it has also triggered negative reactions from conservative sectors.

== Theater ==
In 2018, during Jair Bolsonaro's presidential campaign, Argentine artist Ezequiel Barrios was prevented from presenting his dance-theater piece, Puto, at the Federal University of Pernambuco. Despite the decision, Barrios expressed his desire to perform the piece.

A 2019 study examining tourism during the São Paulo LGBT Pride Parade, focusing on theatrical performances as a cultural attraction, analyzed LGBTQ plays presented in 2017 and 2018, finding a bias towards gay men and limited representation of other gender identities.

== Television ==
During Jair Bolsonaro's presidency in Brazil, a controversial decision was implemented to withdraw public funding for LGBTQ television series. The measure directly affected four finalist productions in the "RDE/FSA PRODAV" public competition, dedicated to gender and sexual diversity. Henrique Pires, then Secretary of Culture, resigned in protest against what he considered a violation of freedom of expression. Bolsonaro defended his position, arguing that it was not censorship, but rather a matter of not investing public resources in sexual themes.
