= Mato Grosso LGBTQIA+ Pride Parade =

Annual LGBTQ event in Cuiabá, Brazil

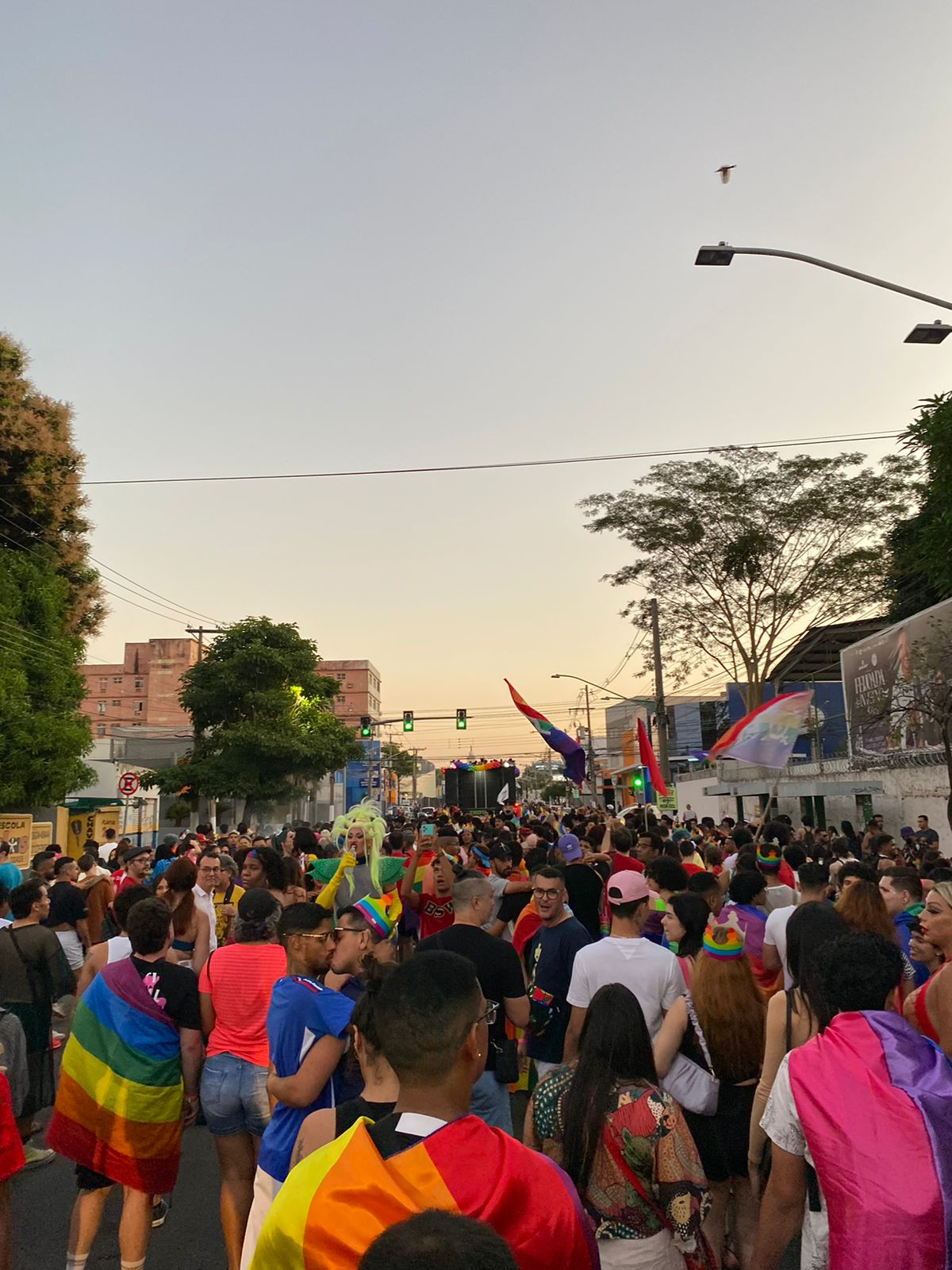
- 21st LGBTQIA+ Mato Grosso Pride Parade in 2024
- Genre: Pride parade
- Date: June to December
- Locations: Cuiabá, Brazil
- Inaugurated: 2003
- Founders: Livre-Mente
- Organiser: APOLGBTQIA+MT
- Website: www.instagram.com/paradamt?igsh=dmlsMmZjNjA0bHhu

The Mato Grosso LGBTQIA+ Pride Parade (Brazilian Portuguese: Parada do Orgulho LGBTQIA+ de Mato Grosso) is an LGBTQ pride parade that has been held since 2003 in the city of Cuiabá, Mato Grosso, Brazil. The event features participation from the LGBTQ community, allies, and other passersby, featuring political demands and artistic performances. It is a mix of party and political demonstration, with participants generally carrying the rainbow flag, displaying body productions, affective practices and icons of music and pop culture, while at the same time demanding social rights, especially against homophobia and its criminalization, in favor of civil unions and same-sex marriage, an end to violence against the LGBTQ population, separation of religion and politics, non-standardization of the concept of family, among other demands. Held on a weekday on important avenues in the city, it is one of the only parades in Brazilian capitals that is not held on a Sunday. Currently, the Parade is organized by the LGBTQIA+ Pride Parade Association of Mato Grosso (APOLGBTQIA+MT).

== History ==
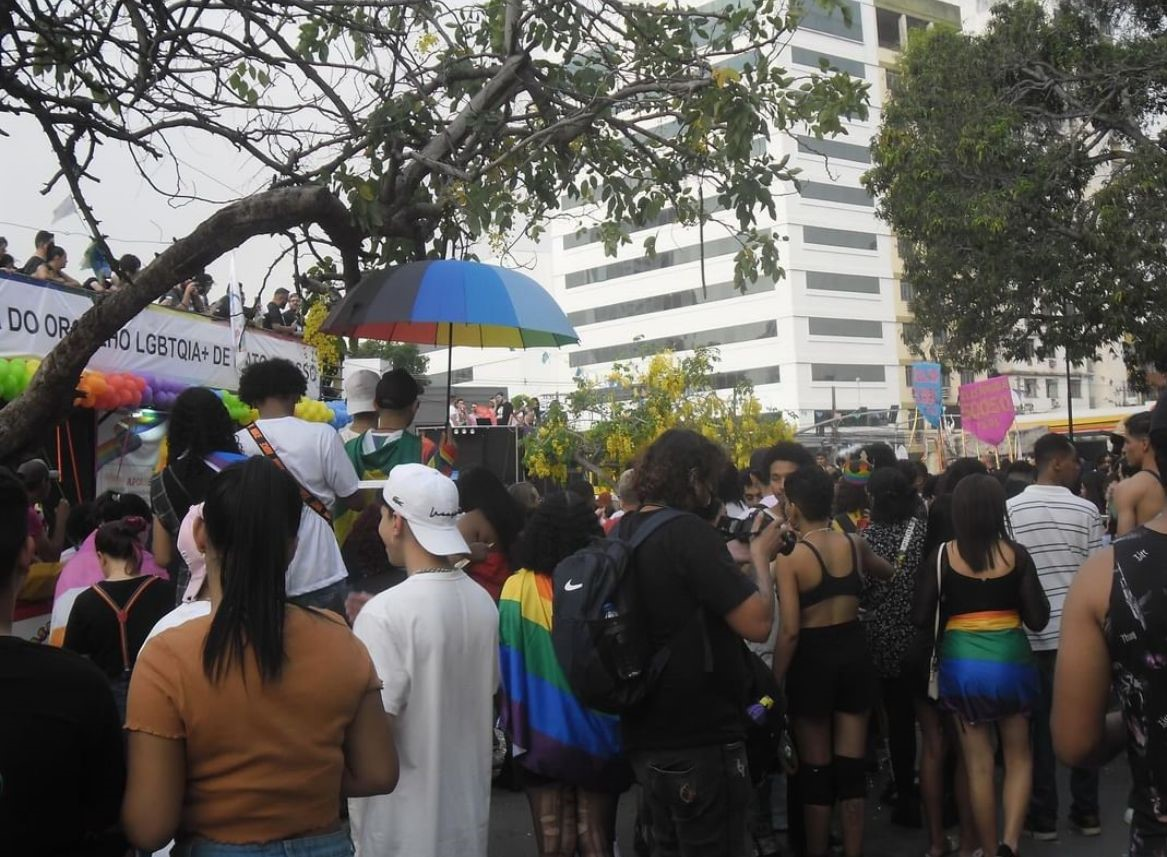
19th LGBTQIA+ Mato Grosso Pride Parade, in 2022.

The first edition of the Parade took place in 2003, created by the first LGBTQ non-governmental organization in Mato Grosso, the Livre-Mente group. Inspired by the growth of the São Paulo LGBTQ Pride Parade, the organizers chose to hold the Parade on a weekday so that it would become a speech for the city, not just for the LGBTQ population. Since then, the event has taken place annually and has been organized by different organizations of the LGBTQ movement, having not been held only in 2020 due to measures to combat the COVID-19 pandemic.

The event usually begins with a gathering at Ipiranga Square, where, sometimes, evangelical groups schedule services in a bandstand on the same dates as the Parade, in addition to there being one of the largest local evangelical churches nearby, which has already generated conflicts in some editions of the event. After gathering, participants move on, following a route that passes through some of the city's main avenues.

From the third edition of the Parade, in 2005, the organizers began to use themes in each edition, aiming to identify the inclusion of the fight for civil rights in the movement's agenda.

The 2016 edition, whose slogan was "Citizenship is not a privilege" (Brazilian Portuguese: Cidadania não é privilégio), was led by travestis, drag queens, and cross-dressers, who chanted slogans or made political speeches in support of equality. Some of the actions carried out during the parade included: a call for "colored votes" for the upcoming municipal elections, that is, votes for candidates who support public policies for LGBT people; booing candidates and religious fundamentalist deputies and councilors, mentioned by name on sound trucks; and the parade's closing in front of Cuiabá City Hall with a "kissing ceremony," an invitation for participants to kiss their partners as a form of protest.

In the 2017 edition, the event also featured a show by singer Ludmilla.

== See also ==
- LGBTQ rights in Mato Grosso
- LGBTQ history in Brazil
- LGBTQ culture in Brazil
