= Timeline of LGBTQ history in Brazil =

Overview of the history of LGBTQ rights in Brazil

Brazilian pride flag

This article is intended to give an overview of the history of LGBTQ rights in Brazil.

== Prior to 1800 ==
- 1533: Portuguese Penal Code was instituted by colonial administration in Brazil. It criminalized sodomy or any sort of sexual intercourse between people of the same sex; it was influenced by the English Buggery Act 1533.
- 1591: Felipa de Souza was convicted of having relations with other women and tortured.
- 1614: Tibira do Maranhão was the first person to be executed for homosexuality in Brazil.

== 19th century ==
- 1830: Dom Pedro I signed into law the Imperial Penal Code. It eliminated all references to sodomy.

== 20th century ==
1960s

- 1960: Communism in Brazil--According to this vision (of communism), homosexuality was a product of bourgeois decadence and would disappear when capitalism was overthrown and a communist society established. In the 1960s, the Brazilian government viewed homosexuality as a fallacy that disrupted the true male essence of masculinity and bypassed an actual militant's image. The Maoist Communist Party of Brazil believed that homosexuality was intertwined with that capitalist ideology and that with the overthrowing of capitalism, homosexuality would too fall with it.

1970s

- 1978: SOMOS: Grupo de Affirmação Homossexual, Brazil's first LGBTQ activist group, founded in São Paulo.
- 1978: Two years later (1981), most of the women in it split to form the country's first independent lesbian organization, the Autonomous Lesbian Feminist Group (GALF).
- 1978: O Lampião, a gay magazine, with contributions by many famous authors, like João Silvério Trevisan, Aguinaldo Silva and Luiz Mott, is launched in April. It survived for three years.
- 1978-1979: Dr. Roberto Farina is tried and acquitted in a trial stemming from the first male-to-female gender-affirming surgery performed in Brazil.
- 1979: Grupo Lésbico-Feminista was formed in São Paulo by Míriam Martinho, Rosely Roth and others. It remained active for three years.
- Pornochanchadas were films that took off in the 70s and 80s, these were erotic-comedies of homosexuals. The films depicted the LGBTQ characters as a stereotype, affiliating them with a lower status and giving them scripts that were lifeless and displayed a fake flamboyant nature.

=== 1980–1989 ===
- 1980: Gay Group of Bahia, the oldest gay rights organization in Brazil, was founded in Salvador, Bahia, together with SOMOS, another organization in São Paulo, State of São Paulo.
- 1981: Grupo Ação Lésbica-Feminista (GALF) is formed in São Paulo with former members of Grupo Lésbico-Feminista and begins publishing a feminist journal "ChanacomChana". The banning of distribution of this journal in 1983 at the Ferro Bar and the protest that ensued is known as the Brazilian Stonewall. It remained active until 1989.
- 1981: By 1981, the movement in that city had fractured into eight to ten tiny groups, some of which formed an umbrella collective called the Autonomous Homosexual Movement (MHA).
- 1985: the Federal Council of Medicine of Brazil removes homosexuality from further mention as "deviant".
- 1989: The constitutions of Mato Grosso and Sergipe states were signed into law. They explicitly forbid discrimination on grounds of sexual orientation.

=== 1990–1999 ===
- 1995: Congresswoman Marta Suplicy proposes Bill project No. 1151 concerning civil unions. The bill has been pending approval in the House since 1995.
- 1994: Fresa y Chocolate was exhibited in Brazil in 1994. This film holds a great contribution to the LGBT community within Brazil. Directed by Arnaldo Jabor, it depicts a gay protagonist-Diego, which at the time was not highly controversial but some of the public still held negative connotations towards the LGBT community. The film contains a deeper more symbolic meaning of acceptance and the understanding of democratic views within Cuba and Brazil. Journalist reviews perceived David and Diego's affection towards one another as means of a friendship, this is understandable, but it goes against what the director may have wanted the audience to see or comprehend. For that two men can love each other more than that of being friends.
- 1997: G Magazine, the first gay-oriented erotic magazine was published and enjoyed a large national distribution.
- 1999: the Federal Council of Psychology published a resolution that has standardized the conduct of psychologists facing the question: "... psychologists did not collaborate with events or services proposing treatment and cure of homosexuality."

== 21st century ==
=== 2000–2009 ===
- 2000: On November 30, the city council of Niterói, in the State of Rio de Janeiro, passed an ordinance prohibiting discrimination based on sexual orientation in public places and institutions as well as in businesses.
- 2004: Rio Grande do Sul allows same-sex partners to register civil unions in a generic civil law notary after a court decision in March 2004.
- 2004: The Brazilian government launched Brasil Sem Homophobia (lit. 'Brazil without Homophobia') to ensure that public policy did not discriminate against the LGBTQ community.
- 2006: A male gay couple from Catanduva, São Paulo officially adopted a five-year-old girl. According to Folha de S. Paulo, a lesbian couple from Rio Grande do Sul were the first to use this right.
- June 10, 2007: In its eleventh edition, the São Paulo Gay Pride Parade breaks its own record as the biggest parade in the world and attracts 3.5 million people.
- June 25, 2007: The Richarlyson affair occurred in which a judge was brought before the Justice Council of São Paulo for stating in court that soccer is a "virile, masculine sport and not a homosexual one." However, afterwards the same judge apologized and afterwards decided to annul the decision he wrote.
- 2008: National LGBT Conference was held. The event, the first in the world to be organized by a government, is a result of demands made by civil society and the Brazilian government's support of LGBT people's rights.

=== 2010–present ===
- 2010: In a landmark trial by ministers, the 4th Class of the Superior Court of Justice of Brazil acknowledged, unanimously, that homosexual couples have the right to adopt children.
- 2011: On May 5, the Supreme Federal Court unanimously extended the stable unions status (Brazilian Portuguese: união estável) to same-sex couples nationwide by redefining the laic definition of family and provided 112 rights to these couples. The extension of marriage institute was not discussed in this decision.
- 2011: On June 27, first same-sex civil union was converted into a same-sex marriage in Brazil. A Brazilian judge in São Paulo had converted a civil union into a same-sex marriage, a first in the nation.
- 2011: On June 28, another stable union between same-sex couples has been converted into a marriage. This time it was Judge Jennifer Antunes de Souza, the 4th of Brasilia Family Court which upheld the order.
- 2011: On October 25, The Superior Court of Justice declared that the legal union of two women who petitioned the court could be recognized as a marriage. The decision of the Supreme Court will only reach the authors of the demand, but a precedent for other couples do the same request.
- 2013: On May 14, 2013, Brazil's National Council of Justice ruled that same-sex couples should not be denied marriage licenses, allowing same-sex marriages to begin nationwide. (Previously, about half of Brazil's 27 jurisdictions had allowed same-sex marriage). This year, the country also legalized adoption by same-sex couples.
- 2021: According to a Human Rights Measurement Initiative report, human rights experts pointed out that the Brazilian LGBTQI+ community is still underrepresented in national politics, being one of the key groups at risk for the Right to participate in government.
- 2023: The CNCD/LGBT is re-established by Lula as a 38-member body under the Ministry of Human Rights and Citizenship. Symmy Larrat is appointed as the first National Secretary for the Promotion and Defense of the Rights of LGBTQIA+ People under the Ministry.
- 2024: The Supreme Federal Court ruled that public and private schools must fight discrimination based on sexual orientation and gender identity and sexist bullying (against cisgender and transgender girls) and homotransphobic (against gay, lesbian, bisexual and transgender people).
- 2025: The Superior Court of Justice decided that it is possible to rectify the civil registry to include the neutral gender. The Superior Court's decision only affects the plaintiff, but serves as a precedent that can be followed in similar cases.

== See also ==
- History of transgender people in Brazil
