= Beyond Carnival =

Book detailing Brazilian homosexual subculture

- Author: James N. Green
- Language: English
- Genre: Non-Fiction
- Published: 1999
- Publisher: University of Chicago Press
- Publication date: 1999
- Publication place: United States
- Pages: 407
- ISBN: 0-226-30638-0

Beyond Carnival: Male Homosexuality in Twentieth-Century Brazil is a nonfiction book by historian James N. Green published by the University of Chicago Press in 1999. The book details the development of the homosexual subcultures that developed in Rio de Janeiro and São Paulo, specifically regarding gay men. A Portuguese translation of the book was published by Editora da UNESP in 2000, and a third expanded edition came out in 2022.

Beyond Carnival is Green's first published book and is widely considered a classic in the field of gender and sexuality studies. It was followed by We Cannot Remain Silent: Opposition to the Brazilian Military Dictatorship in the United States in 2010 and Exile within Exiles: Herbert Daniel, Gay Brazilian Revolutionary in 2018.

== Summary ==
In Beyond Carnival, Green focuses on the Brazilian homosexual populations in Rio de Janeiro and São Paulo. Despite the increasing acceptance by the general population, gay men still face discrimination, and Green chose to focus specifically on gay men so as to provide insight into a marginalized group and identity. This also allows the exploration of Brazilian concepts of masculinity and femininity, what constitutes acceptable behavior, and shared societal values.

The book details the history of sociability among gay men beginning in the late 19th century. Sources from this period are scarce so Green compiled information from police reports. Homosexuality was not explicitly illegal in Brazil, so police instead arrested men found having sex with other men for violating laws of public indecency or vagrancy. Most of these reports took place at the turn of the 20th century in Largo do Rossio, a park in downtown Rio de Janeiro, now known as Tiradentes Square. In the 1940s and afterwards, many gay men understood their sexuality through a gendered binary: the penetrated sexual partner, called the bicha (similar to bitch), was the subordinate, while the "real man", or bofe, was the penetrator. Early studies of male homosexuality focused on a small group of men with no acknowledgement of diversity within the subgroup. Madame Satã, for example, acted "masculine" but enjoyed being the "passive" bicha (or bottom) in sexual relationships.

After World War II, there was a mass influx of migrants from other parts of Brazil to Rio de Janeiro and São Paulo. During this period, the term "entendido" was used by middle class gay men to define someone who failed to fit into the strict active or passive roles in sex. In the late 1950s, Brazilian sociologist José Fábio Barbosa da Silva conducted research on a wider population of gay men, claiming that past studies may have been biased due to the framing of homosexuality as a disease rather than as a natural occurrence. Rio de Janeiro and São Paulo were among the first to begin releasing homemade newsletters, like O Snob, which focused exclusively on gay culture and gossip. These circulated in Rio during the 1960s.

Carnival festivities in Rio de Janeiro allowed drag performers to enter the public eye under the guise of costumes and celebration. Gay clubs with drag performances became more common in these two major cities, along with a rise in cross-dressing prostitution. The 1970s, Brazil saw an emergence of a visible gay rights movement, with activists pushing for laws that protected the LGBT community from discrimination and for greater representation in media. National conversations concerning civil marriage and violence, as well as increased representation in Carnival, have established a growing movement for national recognition that homosexual identities are just as valid as their heterosexual counterparts.

== Sources and publication ==
Primary sources for this book include medical studies, depositions, autobiographies, and personal interviews. A source Green used for the late 19th century in particular is the novel Bom-Crioulo by Adolfo Caminha which was published in 1895 and portrays homosexual encounters in a relatively positive light. However, contemporaries of Caminha harshly criticized the novel for covering such an immoral practice, reflecting attitudes of this era. In the 1930s, Leonídio Ribero's Homosexualismo e endocrinologia was the most commonly cited study explaining biological differences between "sick" gay men and "healthy" heterosexual men, allegedly due to endocrinological imbalances.

Beyond Carnival won the Pacific Coast Council on Latin American Studies' Hubert Herring Award for Best Book and the Lambda Literary Foundation/Paul Monette-Roger Horwitz Trust Award. The Portuguese-language edition, Além do Carnaval: a homossexualidade masculine no Brasil do século XX was awarded the Cidadania em Respeito à Diversidade [Citizenship Respecting Diversity] Book Award by the organizers of the São Paulo Pride in 2001. In 2022, Editora da UNESP published an enlarged third edition of the Portuguese-language version of the work with a new chapter of the period between 1980 and 2000.

=== Critical reception ===
In 2001 and 2002, Richard Parker, Charles Klein, and Susan Besse praised Green's way of acknowledging systemic issues such as violence, oppression, privilege, and stereotypes within both a historical and cultural context. In 2003, Barbara Weinstein called Green's work "genuinely pathbreaking" and expressed approval of the "innovative and often daring way" in which Green wrote.
