= Lesbian Feminist Action Group =

Brazilian lesbian feminist organization

Grupo Ação Lésbica Feminista (English: Lesbian Feminist Action Group, abbreviated as GALF) was one of the first organizations of the Homosexual Brazilian Movement. It was founded in São Paulo in October 1981 by activists including Míriam Martinho and Rosely Roth. The organization came to an end in March 1990.

GALF was the only group of lesbian activists that stayed active throughout nearly all of the 1980s. They paved the road for lesbian visibility during that time period through their news bulletins (Chanacomchana and Um Outro Olhar) and carrying out activities together with Brazil's gay and feminist movements as the newly forming international lesbian movement. In 1983, the group gained attention for carrying out the protest at Ferro's Bar to undo the location's sales ban on Chanacomchana. The day of the protest, August 19, was consecrated as National Lesbian Pride Day in July 2003. GALF was notable its participation in television and print media at a time when homosexuality was not openly discussed.

== Publications ==
Edited and published by Míriam Martinho as a fanzine, Chanacomchana contained cut up collages and printed text. Creations from GALF's members were gathered together in Chanacomchana, especially in the organization's first three years. Later on as the group gained publicity, collaborators from around the country would contribute their works as well. The publication tackled subjects impacting lesbians and women in general. It had 12 editions until 1987. It was succeeded by another publication more centered on the lesbian experience named Um Outro Olhar (English: Another Perspective). There were 10 editions of Um Outro Olhar up until February 1990. The title was continued as a magazine by the lesbian information network Um Outro Olhar in the 1990s.

== Activism ==
Aside from the Ferro's Bar protest, GALF participated in the fight for the two flags of the Homosexual Movement of the 1980s. They claimed support together with parliament members for a couple political campaigns. One such campaign was against code CID 302.0, followed by INAMPS (National Institute for Medical Assistance and Social Security) in Brazil, which considered homosexuality a mental illness. The other campaign, done in conjunction with Grupo Gay da Bahia (Gay Group of Bahia) and Triângulo Rosa (Pink Triangle), was to include the phrase "against discrimination due to preference or sexual orientation" in article 3 paragraph 4 of the 1988 Constitution (article 153 of the 1969 Constitution).

GALF participated in two historic meetings for the articulation of the International Lesbian Movement. They were a part of the 8th conference of the International Lesbian Information Service (ILIS) held in Geneva from March 25 to 28 of 1986. Regional lesbian organizations in Asia and Latin America originated from the event. In October 1987, GALF was part of a meeting by the Feminist-Lesbians of Latin America and the Caribbean in Cuernavaca, Morelos, Mexico.

== Press visibility ==
The GALF activist Rosely Roth was spotlighted in the press and on television in the 1980s, especially after the Ferro's bar protest. The protest was recorded in an article by journalist Carlos Brickman, and in photographs by Ovídio Viera. Both of them participated in television programs presented by Hebe Carmargo on May 25, 1985 and April 29, 1986.

GALF originated the lesbian information network Um Outro Olhar, founded on April 12, 1990, to continue producing the news bulletin Um Outro Olhar which later became a magazine. Lesbian information network Um Outro Olhar, developed projects about lesbian health funded by government agencies until 1995.

== See also ==
- Timeline of LGBTQ history in Brazil
- LGBTQ rights in São Paulo
- Somos Group
