= LGBTQ movements in Brazil =

LGBTQ civil rights movements in Brazil are a series of socio-political-cultural manifestations in favor of the recognition of sexual diversity and the promotion of the LGBTQ rights.

The movement itself doesn't have a specific starting date, but demonstrations against prejudice against homosexual people can be traced back to the 1960s, gaining momentum from the 1970s onwards, after the political opening.

== History ==
=== Background ===
The first political act regarding gay rights in Brazil was recorded in 1977, when João Antônio Mascarenhas, a lawyer from Rio Grande do Sul who lived in Rio de Janeiro, invited the editor of the publication Gay Sunshine, from San Francisco, United States, to give lectures in the country.

During the military dictatorship, Mascarenhas also created the publication O Lampião da Esquina, which campaigned against homophobia and for LGBTQ rights, and ran from 1978 to 1981.

=== Organized movement ===
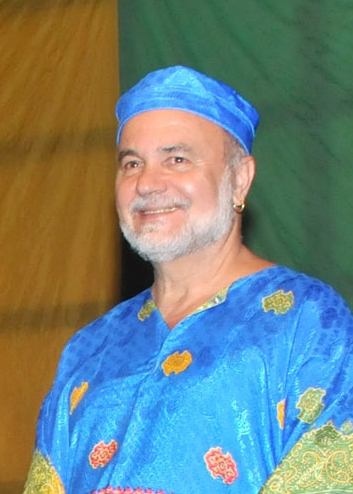
Luiz Mott in 2010, during a ceremony in Brasília.

In the 1970s, Somos - Grupo de Afirmação Homossexual was created in São Paulo.

Just as in the feminist and black movements, the "first wave" of the homosexual movement contained proposals for transformation of society as a whole. The Somos group and the Lampião da Esquina newspaper belonged primarily to this phase. The movement of this period is marked by a strong anti-dictatorial character.

In 1979, at one of the first meetings of homosexual activists in Rio de Janeiro, the resolutions included demanding the inclusion of protections for sexual orientation in the federal constitution; campaigns to remove homosexuality from the list of diseases; and the convocation of the first meeting of an organized group of homosexuals, which took place in São Paulo in April 1980. In the same year, a split occurred within the Somos group with the emergence of the first exclusively lesbian group. On June 13th, the first march organized by the movement took place in the central region of São Paulo.

Starting in 1980, the Grupo Gay da Bahia (GGB) began its activities, which would have a very large influence in the 1980s, especially in the Northeast. In 1983, the Somos group from São Paulo was dissolved. It was during this time that the HIV/AIDS epidemic emerged.

It is in this context that the "second wave" of the homosexual movement in Brazil emerges, corresponding to a period of increased public visibility of homosexuality, with the beginning of the creation of a market for goods and services aimed at the homosexual public.

=== 1988 Constitution ===
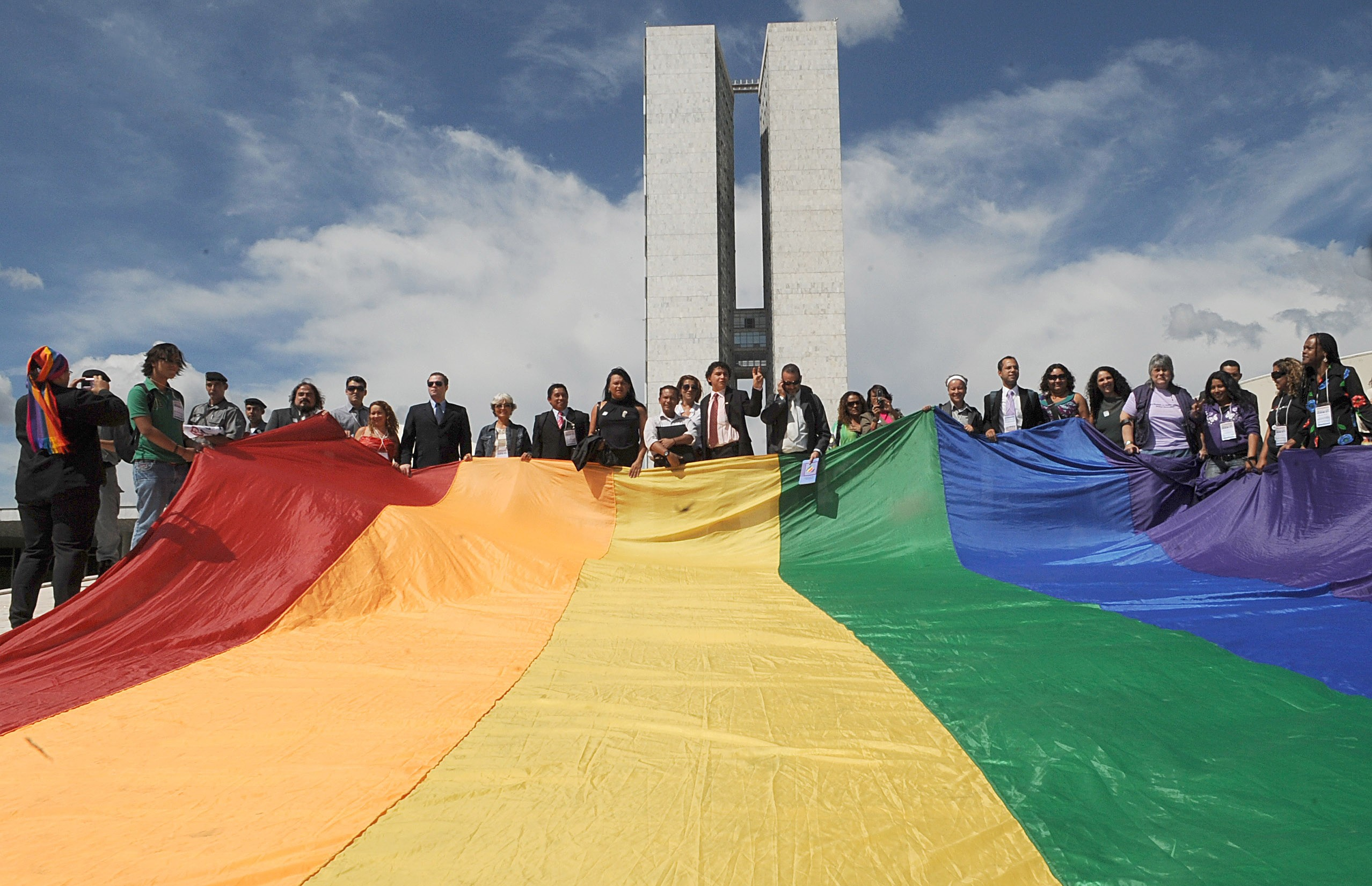
Protest in favor of LGBTQ rights in front of the National Congress of Brazil.

In 1985, João Antônio Mascarenhas also collaborated with the decision of the Federal Council of Medicine (CFM) to stop considering homosexuality a mental disorder. Furthermore, the lawyer participated in the debate surrounding the drafting of the 1988 Federal Constitution, being the first Brazilian homosexual to be invited to speak to the National Constituent Assembly, with the aim of arguing for the inclusion of the term "sexual orientation" in Article 3, Item IV, which established "the well-being of all, without prejudice against any form of discrimination."

On 28 January 1988, however, the term was ultimately rejected by the majority of representatives in the Constituent Assembly. Of the 559 politicians holding office in the Brazilian National Congress, 429 opposed the proposed inclusion.

=== Third wave ===
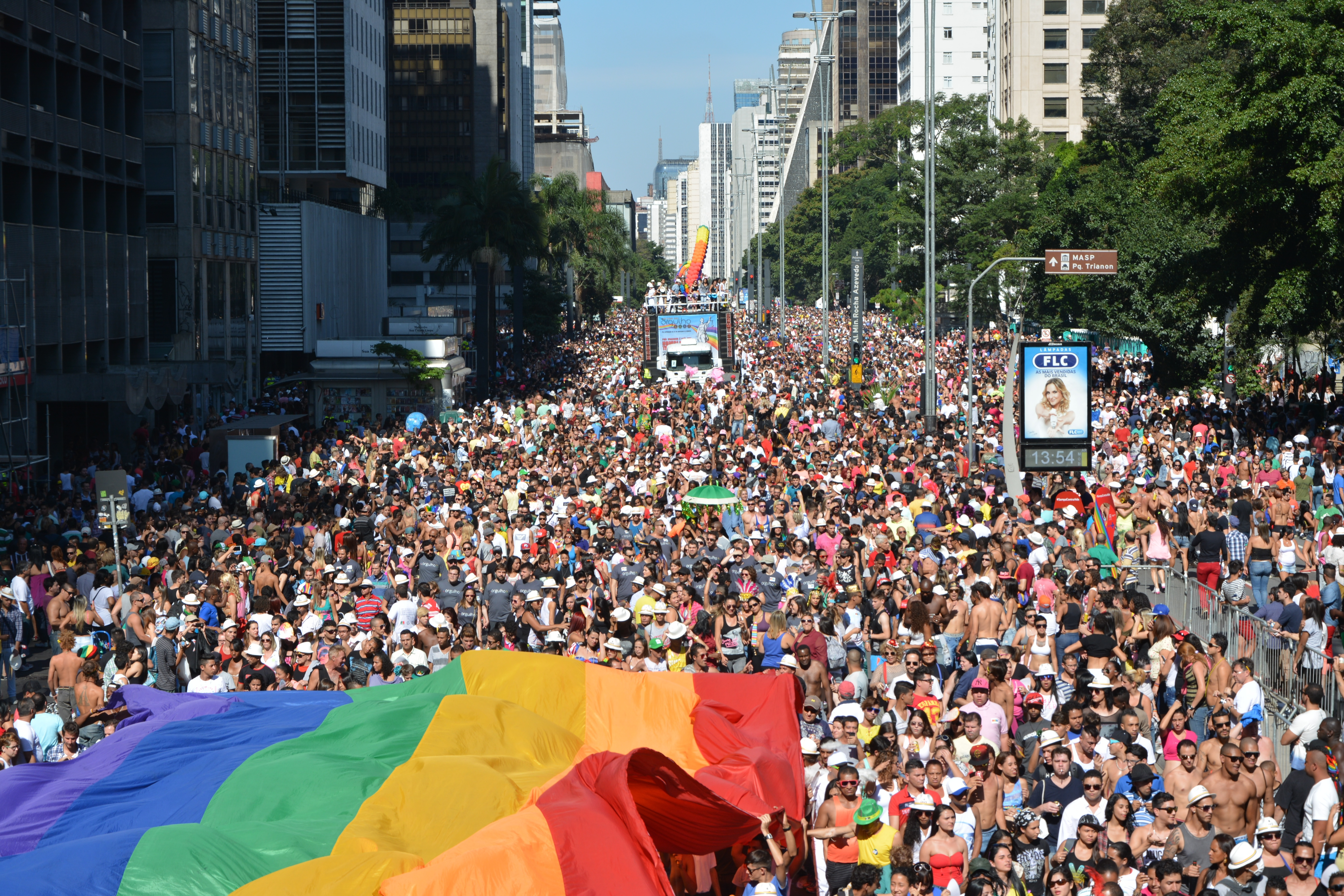
The 2014 edition of the São Paulo LGBTQ Pride Parade.

In the early 1990s, the LGBTQ movement grew as a response to the epidemic, making Brazil a pioneer in the community and government response to AIDS (see HIV/AIDS in Brazil) and initiating the "third wave" of the movement. This period also saw an increase in the number of groups and the expansion of the movement throughout all states of the country, as well as a diversification of organizational types.

In this new phase, one of the characteristics is the differentiation of various internal political subjects within the movement: lesbians, gays, bisexuals, travestis, and transsexuals, focusing on the specific demands of each of these groups. In 1995, the Associação Brasileira de Gays, Lésbicas, Bissexuais, Travestis e Transexuais (ABGLT) was founded, the first and largest network of Brazilian LGBTQ organizations, bringing together around 200 organizations spread throughout the country, and considered the largest network of its kind in Latin America. With the creation of ABGLT, several national networks emerged across the country. In 2007, there was ABGLT, the Associação Brasileira de Lésbicas (ABL), the Liga Brasileira de Lésbicas (LBL), the Associação Nacional de Travestis (Antra), the Coletivo Nacional de Transexuais (CNT), the Coletivo Brasileiro de Bissexuais (CBB), and the Rede Afro LGBT.

Gay pride parades began to take place throughout the country. According to ABGLT, 300 such events were held in the country in 2007. The largest of them, the São Paulo LGBTQ Pride Parade, has gathered as many as 3 million people, according to the São Paulo City Hall.

In 2004, the Brasil sem Homofobia program was created, with the objective of creating an interministerial articulation to include actions to combat homophobia. In the 2014 elections, Congressman Jean Wyllys was re-elected as the seventh most voted among the candidates in the state of Rio de Janeiro, with just under 145,000 valid votes. Openly gay, Wyllys is one of the most active Brazilian parliamentarians in the defense of human rights, especially LGBTQ rights. The largest organized fan group in Brazil, Galo Queer, was founded in Minas Gerais.
