= LGBTQ rights in São Paulo =

- Legal status: Legal since 1830, age of consent equalised
- Gender identity: Gender change allowed, official standard for altering legal sex doesn't require surgery since 2018
- Military: Allowed to serve openly
- Discrimination protections: Since 2019

Family rights
- Recognition of relationships: Same-sex marriage since 2013
- Adoption: Legal since 2010

Lesbian, gay, bisexual, transgender and queer (LGBTQ) rights in the Brazilian state of São Paulo are liberal. Same-sex marriage is legally performed in the state, as in Brazil as a whole.

== Legality ==
Same-sex sexual activity has been legal in Brazil since 1830.

On December 18, 2012, the Justice Court of São Paulo state ordered all notaries statewide to open marriages licenses for same-sex couples, becoming the most populous Brazilian state to offer same-sex marriages in a manner that is equal to other marriages.

In 2006, a male gay couple from Catanduva officially adopted a five-year-old girl.

== Hate crimes and discrimination law ==
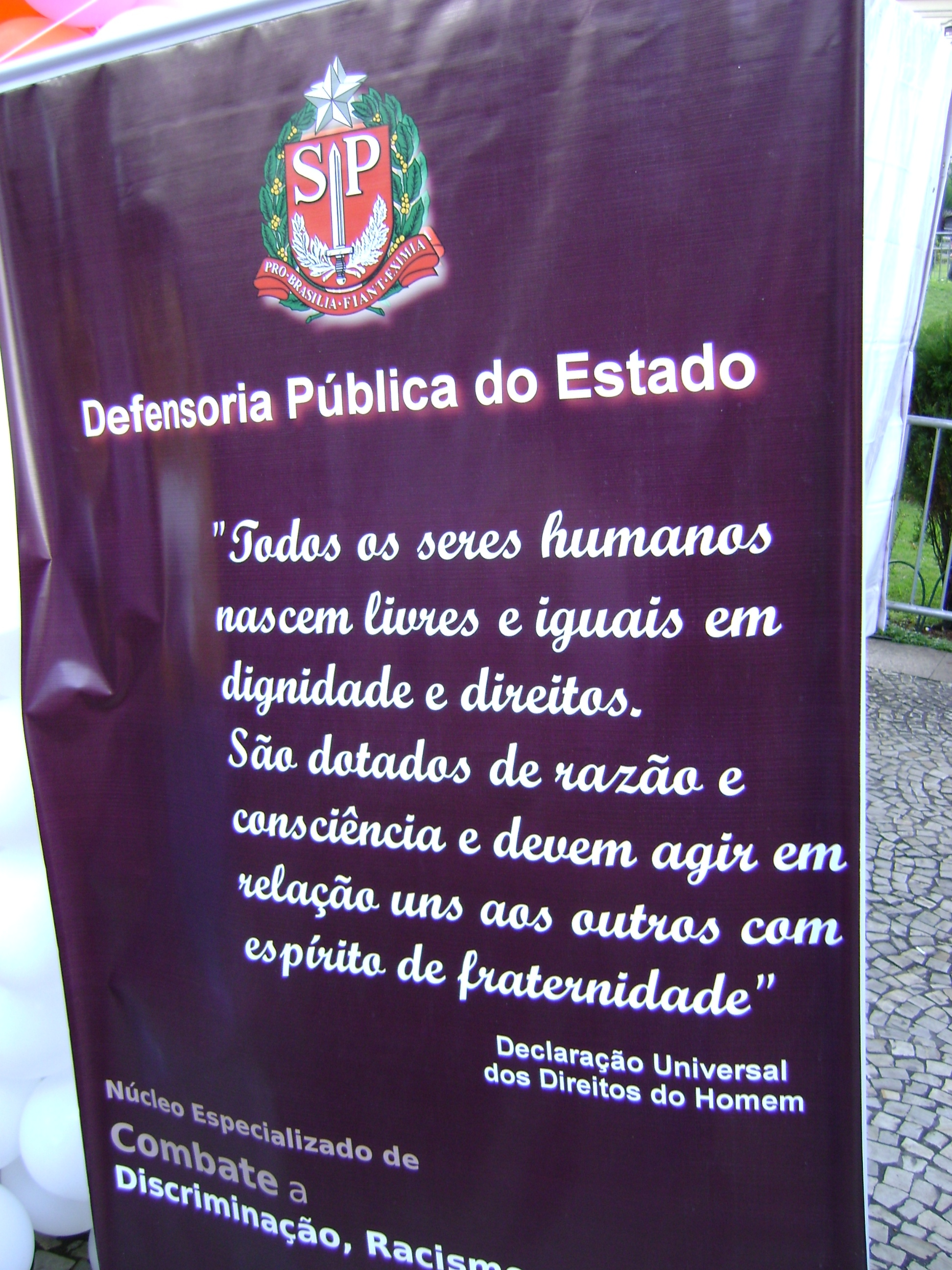
Large poster of the Public Defender's Office of the state of São Paulo, promoting the LGBTQ civil rights.

The São Paulo Law No. 10 948 went into effect on 5 November 2001, providing for penalties to be applied to the practice of discrimination on grounds of sexual orientation and other measures.

In 2019, discrimination based on gender identity was banned through a decision by the Supreme Federal Court.

== Gender identity and expression ==
The Supreme Federal Court of Brazil ruled on March 1, 2018, that a transgender person has the right to change their official name and sex without the need of surgery or professional evaluation, just by self-declaration of their psychosocial identity.

Although there is no specific law on the subject, the Court of Justice of São Paulo (TJ-SP) has ruled in some cases that non-binary people can change the gender marker on their documents.

On April 1, 2025, the State University of Campinas approved quotas for transgender, travesti, and non-binary people, based on gender self-identification. The Associação Matria filed a lawsuit against the university regarding these quotas; however, the case was dismissed on February 3, 2026, by Judge Mauro Iuji Fukumoto of the 1st Public Treasury Court of Campinas. The association appealed, but Judge Fukumoto’s decision was upheld by the Court of Justice of São Paulo on February 8, 2026.

On April 2, 2025, city councilor Rubinho Nunes filed a lawsuit against the university seeking to overturn the quotas. On April 11, 2025, the São Paulo Public Prosecutor's Office requested that the university provide a study justifying the establishment of the quotas. On June 15, 2026, the Court of Justice of São Paulo upheld the quotas.

=== Bathroom ban ===
In August 2017, the Sorocaba City Council passed a law prohibiting transgender students from using the women's public restrooms in schools in the city. The law passed by a vote of 15–3. After the law was passed, LGBTQ activists protested against it.

In October 2019, the law was overturned by the Court of Justice of São Paulo (TJ-SP).

On December 2, 2021, the Santo André City Council approved a bill by a 17–3 vote to ban unisex restrooms in the city. It was signed into law by the Speaker of the City Council, Pedro Luiz Mattos Canhassi Botaro, on March 15, 2022. The law was struck down by the Court of Justice of São Paulo on December 18, 2024.

On November 19, 2021, state representative Altair Moraes, of the Republicanos party, introduced a bill in the Legislative Assembly of São Paulo to ban unisex restrooms and changing rooms in the state. Moraes stated: "We cannot allow these ideological fads to take precedence over the safety of everyone—especially children and adolescents, who are the most vulnerable group."

On January 11, 2022, the city of São Bernardo do Campo enacted a law prohibiting unisex restrooms. In July 2022, the law was suspended by appellate judge Mario Sarrubbo, of the Court of Justice of São Paulo. In May 2023, the Court of Justice upheld Sarrubbo's decision and struck down the law.

== Education ==
On September 28, 2017, the mayor of Pedreira, Hamilton Bernardes Júnior, enacted Law No. 3,670, which prohibits the teaching of "gender ideology" in the city's schools. Another law banning "gender ideology" was enacted on December 17 of the same year in the city of Várzea Paulista, by Mayor Juvenal Rossi.

On September 3, 2019, then-Governor of São Paulo, João Doria (PSDB), ordered the withdrawal of teaching materials for 8th grade students that discussed sexual orientation and gender identity. In a tweet, the governor stated:

We were alerted to an unacceptable error in the school material for 8th-grade students in the state school system. I requested the Secretary of Education to immediately withdraw the material and investigate those responsible. We do not agree with or accept the promotion of gender ideology.

On the 5th, the Public Prosecutor's Office of São Paulo opened an investigation to look into the governor's decision.

On the 10th, a court overturned the governor's decision and ruled that the material should be returned to the schools within 48 hours, under penalty of a fine for non-compliance.

On May 15, 2023, the city of Votorantim enacted a law prohibiting the teaching of gender-neutral language in the city's schools. The law was overturned by the Supreme Federal Court on 11 November 2024.

== Proposed restrictions on pride parades ==
On May 20, 2026, the São Paulo City Council approved in its first reading a bill to prohibit the participation of minors in the city's pride parades. The bill was proposed by councilman Rubinho Nunes (UNIÃO), who claimed that the bill aimed to "protect children and adolescents from content inappropriate for their age."

The bill was criticized by lawyer and member of the Order of Attorneys of Brazil (OAB) Ariel de Castro Alves, who claimed it is unconstitutional.

== Life conditions ==
=== Cultural expression ===
In 2007, in its eleventh edition, the São Paulo Gay Pride Parade broke its own record as the biggest parade in the world and attracted 3.5 million people. According to the Guinness World Records, the event is the world's largest LGBTQ Pride celebration, with 4 million people in 2009.

=== Rights advocacy ===
SOMOS, an LGBTQ rights organization, was established in 1978 in São Paulo. Grupo de Ação Lésbica-Feminista was founded in São Paulo in 1981.

=== Homophobia ===
In 2005, the Latin American Center of Human Rights in Sexuality (Clam) interviewed participants in the São Paulo Gay Pride Parade and found that 65% of their respondents had experienced hate speech and/or suffered physical aggression.

The Richarlyson affair occurred in which a judge was brought before the Justice Council of São Paulo for stating in court that soccer is a "virile, masculine sport and not a homosexual one." However, afterwards the same judge apologized and afterwards decided to annul the decision he wrote.

According to a survey by Agência Diadorim, out of 467 reports of LGBTphobia in the state, only 28 resulted in fines.

== Summary table ==
Same-sex sexual activity legal	Yes (Since 1830)
Equal age of consent	Yes (Since 1830)
Anti-discrimination laws in employment only	Yes (Since 2001 for sexual orientation; since 2019 for gender identity)
Anti-discrimination laws in the provision of goods and services	Yes (Since 2001 for sexual orientation; since 2019 for gender identity)
Anti-discrimination laws in all other areas (Incl. indirect discrimination, hate speech)	Yes (Since 2001 for sexual orientation; since 2019 for gender identity)
LGBTQ subjects free from censorship in education	Yes / No ("Gender ideology" banned in Pedreira and Várzea Paulista since 2017)
Same-sex marriages	Yes (Since 2012)
Recognition of same-sex couples	Yes (Since 2011)
Stepchild adoption by same-sex couples	Yes (Officially permitted since 2010)
Joint adoption by same-sex couples	Yes (Officially permitted since 2010; allowed in one case in 2006)
LGBTQ people allowed to serve openly in the military	Yes
Right to change legal gender	Yes (Since 2008; gender self-identification since 2018)
Third gender option	Yes / No (Allowed in some cases by court order)
Conversion therapy by medical professionals banned	Yes (Since 1999 for homosexuals and since 2018 for transgender people)
Access to IVF for lesbians	Yes (Since 2013)
Commercial surrogacy for gay male couples	No (Banned for any couple regardless of sexual orientation)
MSMs allowed to donate blood	Yes (Since 2020)
