= James N. Green =

American professor and historian

James Green

James Naylor Green is the Carlos Manuel de Céspedes Professor of Modern Latin American History and Professor of Brazilian History and Culture at Brown University.

== Early life and education ==
Green was born in Baltimore, Maryland. He attended Earlham College from 1968–72, where he studied political science and German. In 1992, he received a Master's degree with honors in Latin American Studies at California State University, Los Angeles. In 1996 he received a doctorate in Latin American history from University of California, Los Angeles, with a focus on Brazil.

== Career ==
After studying at UCLA, Green taught Latin American history for eight years at California State University, Long Beach, before moving to Brown University in 2005. He served as the Director of the Center for Latin American and Caribbean Studies from 2005 until 2008 and the Director of the Brown Brazil Initiative from 2013 to 2020.

Green was the co-founder of what is today the Sexuality Studies Section of the Latin American Studies Association (LASA) in 1992, and served as its first coordinator. He was the President (2002–04) and Executive Secretary (2015–20) of the Brazilian Studies Association (BRASA), and the President of the New England Council of Latin American Studies (2008–09). From 2010 until 2019 he also taught courses on the history of Brazil in winter sessions at the Hebrew University of Jerusalem, and organized five international conferences.

He has received National Endowment of the Humanities, American Philosophical Society, and American Society of Learned Society fellowships. Green was a Fulbright Visiting Professor in the history department at the Federal University of Rio de Janeiro in 2000 and a Distinguished Visiting Professor at the International Relations Institute of the University of São Paulo in 2022.

Green established the Opening the Archives Project at Brown University that has digitized, indexed, and made available to the public on an open-access website over 50,000 U.S. government documents about Brazil produced at the height of the Cold War during the Brazilian military dictatorship (1964–85).

== Political activism ==
While a teenager, the influences of Quakerism led Green to be active in the Anti-Vietnam movement. In May 1971 he was arrested for participating in a non-violent demonstrations in front of the White House and at the headquarters of the Selective Service System. The Federal government later dropped the charges. In 1973 he joined seven other young Quakers to found a political commune in Philadelphia, which had a weekly study group on Latin America. That same year he collaborated with the Committee Against Repression in Brazil (CARIB) in denouncing torture and other human rights violations carried out by the Brazilian military dictatorship (1964–85), including demonstrating in front of the Brazilian embassy in Washington, D.C. He also was active in the Gay Activists Alliance while living in Philadelphia in 1973 and 1974.

After the September 11, 1973 coup d’état in Chile, which overthrew the democratically elected government of Salvador Allende, Green co-founded the Chile Emergency Committee in Philadelphia. In 1974, he moved to the San Francisco Bay Area where he joined the San Francisco Chile Solidarity Committee. As a member of the June 28th Union, a gay socialist collective, he organized Gay Solidarity with the Chilean Resistance, a public event held in San Francisco in September 1975 with 300 members of the LGBT community in attendance.

Between 1976 and 1981, he lived in São Paulo, Brazil, where he taught English and did graduate studies in political science at the University of São Paulo. He was involved in the resistance to the military regime as a member of the Socialist Convergence and as a founding member and leader of the leftwing of Somos: Grupo de Afirmação Homossexual [We Are: Homosexual Affirmation Group], the first politicized LGBT organization in Brazil.

Returning to the United States in 1982, Green lived in Los Angeles where he was a community organizer among the Latin American immigrant community and a bi-lingual social worker for the County of Los Angeles. He was active in the Service Employees International Union, Local 660 and co-founded the Lavender Caucus to defend LBGTQ+ workers’ rights, serving as its first co-coordinator. As a member of the Internationalist Workers Party (Fourth International) from 1982–90, he was the editor of Working-Class Opposition, and was three times a candidate for U.S. Congress on the Peace and Freedom Party ticket.

During the impeachment trial of Brazilian President Dilma Rousseff in 2016, Green was involved in international campaigns to criticize the process, including writing an open letter to the U.S. ambassador to the Organization of American States that circulated widely in Brazil and was later published in an anthology on Rousseff’s impeachment.

In December 2018, Green founded the US Network for Democracy in Brazil. He currently serves as the organization's National Co-Coordinator. He was also the co-founder of the Washington Brazil Office in 2020 and is the president of its board of directors.

== Personal life ==
Green is married to Moshe Sluhovsky, a professor of European history at the Hebrew University of Jerusalem.

== Selected works ==
- Beyond Carnival (1999)

Beyond Carnival: Male Homosexuality in Twentieth Century Brazil (University of Chicago), published in Portuguese in 2000 as "Além do Carnaval: a homossexualidade masculine no Brasil do século XX" (Editora da UNESP) with an expanded and revised Portuguese-language third edition in 2022. Beyond Carnival was awarded the Paul Monette-Roger Horwitz Trust Award by the Lambda Literary Foundation for the best book by an emergent scholar and the Hubert Herring Book Award (co-winner) by the Pacific Coast Council on Latin America (PCCLAS) for the best book on Latin America. In 2001, the Portuguese-language edition won the Cidadania em Respeito à Diversidade [Citizenship Respecting Diversity] Book Prize, awarded by the organizers of the São Paulo LGBT Pride Parade in 2001.

- Homossexualismo em São Paulo e outros escritos [Homosexuality in São Paulo and other writings]

Co-edited with Ronaldo Trindade and José Fábio Barbosa da Silva (São Paulo: Editora da UNESP, 2005). Awarded the Cidadania em Respeito à Diversidade [Citizenship Respecting Diversity] Book Award by the organizers of the São Paulo LGBT Pride Parade in 2006.

- Frescos Trópicos: Fontes sobre a homossexualidade masculina no Brasil (1870-1980) [Tropical Queers: Sources on Male Homosexuality in Brazil, 1870-1980)

With Ronald Pólito (Rio de Janeiro: José Olímpio, 2006). This volume is a collection of documents on the history of male homosexuality in Rio de Janeiro and São Paulo.

- Modern Latin America (2010)

Modern Latin America, 7th ed. 2010; 8th ed. 2013, edited with Peter H. Smith and Thomas E. Skidmore (Oxford University Press), 9th ed. 20, 2010. 464 pp.

- We Cannot Remain Silent: Opposition to the Brazilian Military (2010)

Published originally in 2009 in Portuguese as "Apesar de vocês: a oposição à ditadura militar nos Estados Unidos" (Companhia das Letras) Awarded the Book Work of Merit prize by the Brazil Section of the Latin American Studies Association in 2011.

- A Mother’s Cry: A Memoir of Politics, Prison, and Torture under the Brazilian Military Dictatorship (2010)

A Mother’s Cry: A Memoir of Politics, Prison, and Torture under the Brazilian Military Dictatorship by Lina Penna Sattamini, translated by Rex P. Nielson and James N. Green, with introduction by James N. Green and Epilogue by Marcos S. P. Arruda (Duke University Press, 2010). A first-person account of the arrest and torture of Marcos Arruda, a leftwing activist, imprisoned for his opposition to the military regime.

- Exile and the Politics of Exclusion in the Americas (2012)

Edited with Luis Roniger and Pablo Yankelevich (Sussex Academic Press, 2012).

- Who is the Macho Who Wants to Kill Me?”: Male Homosexuality, Revolutionary Masculinity, and the Brazilian Armed Struggle of the 1960s and 70s (2012)

Featured in the first HAHR Open Forum and published in Portuguese as "“Quem é o macho que quer me matar?”: Homossexualidade masculina, masculinidade revolucionária e luta armada brasileira dos anos 1960 e 1970." Awarded the Joseph T. Criscenti Best Article Prize of the New England Council on Latin American Studies; the Audre Lorde Prize of the Committee on Lesbian and Gay History of the American Historical Association for the most outstanding article published on lesbian, gay, bisexual, transgender, and/or queer history, and the Carlos Monsiváis Prize in Social Sciences from the Sexuality Studies Section of the Latin American Studies Association.

- Homossexualidades e a ditadura brasileira: Opressão, resistência e a busca da verdade [Homosexualities and the Brazilian Dictatorship: Oppression, Resistance, and the Search for Truth] (2014)

Edited with Renan Quinalha (Editora da Universidade Federal de São Carlos, 2014). This collection of nine articles includes the chapter on homosexuality and the dictatorship written by the two editors for the final report of the National Truth Commission. It received the Cidadania em Respeito à Diversidade [Citizenship Respecting Diversity] Book Award from the organizers of the São Paulo LGBT Pride March in 2015.

- História do movimento LGBT no Brasil [History of the LGBT movement in Brazil]

Edited with Renan H. Quinalha, Márcio Caetano, and Marcia Fernandes (São Paulo: Alameda Casa Editorial, 2018). A collection of essays by Brazilian and other LGBT scholars.

- Exile Within Exiles: Herbert Daniel, Gay Brazilian Revolutionary (2018)

Portuguese edition, Revolucionario e Gay: A vida extraordinária de Herbert Daniel, a biography of a medical student, guerrilla fighter, and AIDS activist. (Duke University Press)

- The Brazil Reader: History, Culture, and Politics (2019)

The Brazil Reader: History, Culture, and Politics. 2nd ed., with Victoria Langland and Lilia Moritz Schwarcz (Duke University Press), a collection of 120 documents and commentaries on the history of Brazil.

- Brazil: Five Centuries of Change (2021)

Brazil: Five Centuries of Change,3rd edition, based on the previous editions by Thomas E. Skidmore, (Oxford University Press, 2021), a comprehensive history of Brazil from the colonial period to the present.
