= Thomas E. Skidmore =

Historian

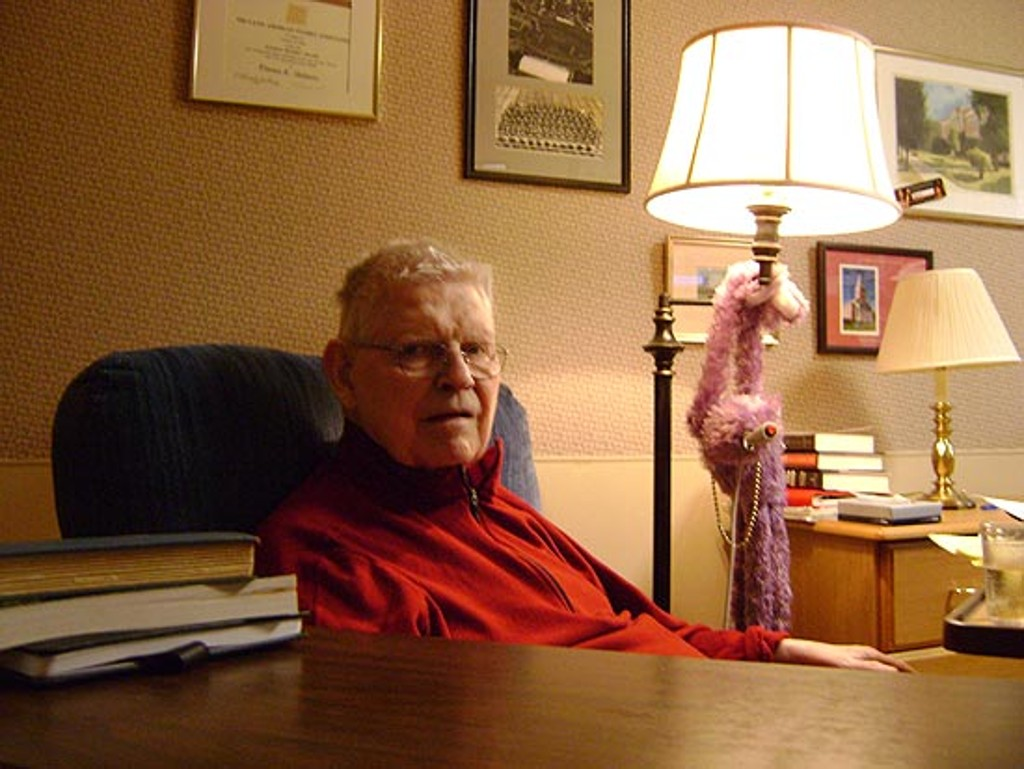
Thomas Skidmore, 2016.

Thomas Elliott Skidmore (July 22, 1932, in Troy, Ohio – June 11, 2016) was an American historian and scholar who specialized in Brazilian history.

== Biography ==
Skidmore graduated in political science and philosophy in 1954 from Denison University. He received a Fulbright Fellowship to study philosophy at Magdalen College, Oxford where he met his wife Felicity. He received a second B.A. in Philosophy, Politics and Economics in 1956 and a master's degree in 1959. He obtained his Ph.D. at Harvard University in 1960 with a thesis on the German Chancellor Leo von Caprivi.

His attention shifted to South America after the Cuban Revolution. His Harvard post-doctorate focused on Brazil. In 1967 he published Politics in Brazil: 1930-64, An Experiment in Democracy.

He began his teaching career at Harvard as an instructor (1960–61), research fellow in Latin American studies (1961–64), and then assistant professor (1964–66). In 1966, Skidmore joined the faculty of the University of Wisconsin, Madison. He became a full professor in 1968. In 1986, Skidmore moved to Brown University.

== Selected bibliography ==
- Politics in Brazil 1930–1964: An Experiment in Democracy (Oxford University Press, 1967)
- Black Into White: Race and Nationality in Brazilian Thought (Oxford University Press, 1974)
- Modern Latin America, with Peter H. Smith and James N. Green (Oxford University Press, multiple editions, 1984–2014)
- The Politics of Military Rule in Brazil: 1964–1985 (1988)
- Television, Politics, and the Transition to Democracy in Latin America (Johns Hopkins University Press, 1993, ed.)
- “Bi-Racial U.S.A. vs Multi-Racial Brazil: Is the Contrast Still Valid?,” Journal of Latin American Studies 25, no. 2 (1993): 373–385
- Brazil: Five Centuries of Change (Oxford University Press, 1999)
