= National Lesbian Visibility Day =

National Lesbian Visibility Day (Brazilian Portuguese: Dia Nacional da Visibilidade Lésbica) is a date established in Brazil, created by lesbian activists and dedicated to the date of the 1st National Lesbian Seminar (Senale), which took place on 29 August 1996.

On this day, the actions are coordinated by ABL - Articulação Brasileira de Lésbicas, ABGLT, Brazilian Lesbian League, Rede Afro LGBT, Rede de Lésbica Negras (Candace), Sapatá, Gender and Sexuality Center of the Bahia State University, Sexuality Research Center of the Federal University of Tocantins, and the State Secretariat for Policies for Women, Racial Equality and Human Rights.

In 2003, on the occasion of the death of lesbian activist Rosely Roth, there was also an initiative to consecrate August 19 as National Lesbian Pride Day. On that day in 1983, lesbian activists led by Rosely and accompanied by participants from other social movements occupied Ferro's Bar in São Paulo, in response to lesbophobic attacks that had occurred a few weeks earlier. Lesbians were fighting for permission to sell a newspaper from the Grupo Ação Lésbica Feminista (GALF), called "Chanacomchana", which discussed topics such as the legalization of abortion, relationships between women, motherhood, and police persecution.

In a public statement, the Human Rights and Minorities Commission (CDHM) stated that "National Lesbian Visibility Day marks a moment of struggle and resistance. The historical discrimination against LGBT people, often manifested in murders, physical and verbal assaults, has limited access to rights. (...) The absence of incisive policies to combat so-called 'corrective rape,' motivated by the lesbophobic intention to correct the sexuality of lesbians, and the invisibility of lesbian women even when LGBTQIA+ debates are in vogue, are issues that deserve special attention and battles for transformation."
