= National Policy for Comprehensive LGBT Health =

The National Policy for Comprehensive LGBT Health (Portuguese: Política Nacional de Saúde Integral LGBT) was created by the Ministry of Health of Brazil in December 2011 and established by Ordinance No. 2,836 as an inclusive policy recognizing the demands of the population covered by the Brazil Without Homophobia Program (2004), in accordance with Article 194 of the 1988 Federal Constitution, which states that...

“Social security comprises an integrated set of actions initiated by the Public Authorities and society, aimed at ensuring rights relating to health, social security and social assistance .”

The implementation strategies for the National Policy for Comprehensive LGBT Health fall to the federal, state, and municipal levels, through an intersectoral and cross-cutting approach to the development of public policies.

It is important to clarify that the terminology LGBT refers to sexual orientations, while the acronym LGBTQIAPN+ also encompasses the multiple existing gender identities (some of which have only recently been taken as objects of study), thus making its understanding in the biomedical field still complex. Therefore, the adoption of the acronym LGBT occurs as a strategic and didactic resource for broader communication with healthcare professionals and the community itself.

== History ==
Specific health issues affecting the LGBT population began to gain visibility in the 1980s due to the HIV/AIDS epidemic and the stigma they suffered from being considered " risk groups " (later referred to as "groups with risky behaviors" and, finally, "key groups").

The recognition of the LGBT community in health policies also came about through the emergence of organized groups focused on debating these issues at the national level. In 1978, the newspaper Lampião da Esquina emerged; SOMOS: Grupo de Afirmação Homossexual (We Are: Homosexual Affirmation Group ), a pioneer in homosexual representation in Brazil also began that year. The inclusion of transvestites and transsexuals, with the adoption of the T in the acronym, only occurred two decades later, in 1990.

== Objective ==
LGBT health policy aims to reduce inequalities and exclusion of vulnerable groups in the health-disease process, as well as promote greater equity of access to the Unified Health System ( SUS) for the population, reinforcing its principles of universality and comprehensiveness. The participation of civil society in the formulation of health policies appropriate to its needs is also part of a project to think about health in a broad and multidisciplinary way, in accordance with the formulations of current policies in the Brazilian public health model.

Other objectives include focusing on guaranteeing the sexual and reproductive rights of the LGBT population, guaranteeing the use of social names by transvestites and transsexuals, offering comprehensive care in the SUS service network for sexually transmitted infections (STIs), and greater access to the Transsexualization Process through the SUS, based on guidelines of respect for human rights, diversity, and the promotion of citizenship.
