= Rosely Roth =

Brazilian LGBT activist (1959–1990)

Rosely Roth (August 21, 1959 in São Paulo, São Paulo, Brazil – August 28, 1990 in São Paulo, São Paulo, Brazil) was a Brazilian anthropologist and activist, considered one of the pioneers in the history of the LGBT movement of Brazil (known in Portuguese as the Movimento Homosexual Brasileiro).

== Biography ==
=== Early life and education ===
The daughter of secular Jewish parents, she attended both Jewish and non-Jewish schools while growing up in her native São Paulo. In 1981, she obtained a degree in Philosophy from the Pontifícia Universidade Católica de São Paulo; and in 1985-1986 she graduated again from the same university with a degree in Anthropology, having dedicated her studies on lesbian life and sexuality in São Paulo.

=== Women's movement and LGBT advocacy ===
Roth was involved in many organizations and activities demanding sexual freedom and equal rights for lesbians and all members of the LGBT community during most of her adult life.

Roth started her direct participation in the women's movement at the beginning of 1981 by attending meetings at the Grupo Lésbico Feminista (1979–1990) and at the SOS Mulher (1980–1993).

In addition, in 1981 Roth and Míriam Martinho, another pioneer of the Brazilian LGBT movement, founded the Grupo Ação Lésbica-Feminista - GALF (1981–1990) in São Paulo. In 1982, Roth and other members of GALF reproduced independent lesbian publication Chanacomchana (1981, 1982–1987), after an indefinite hiatus due to Brazil's conservative military dictatorship.

In 1985, Roth became the first openly lesbian woman to appear on Brazilian television, appearing twice on popular talk show Hebe, where she brought visibility to the LGBT movement while it was still in its infancy in Brazil. Her appearance was met with widespread controversy, leading to the Brazilian military threatening to shut down Hebe and Roth losing her job.

==== Involvement in the Farro's Bar demonstration ====
In 1981, the circulation of Chanacomchana became increasingly difficult, with lesbian women afraid to receive a publication which suggested their sexual identity. As a result, Roth and Martinho began to sell the zine in front of Farro's Bar in 1982, a meeting place for lesbians at the time. In 1983, the owner of Farro's Bar began to gradually ban the circulation of Chanacomchana and expel its activists from the place.

In response to the frequent violent expulsions, on 19 August 1983, the protest began. Activists invaded Ferro's bar and read a lesbian manifesto against the bar's censorship, demanding that the sale of the newspaper be permitted and respected.

The event was a milestone in the history of the fight for LGBT rights in Brazil.

=== Death ===
In the last phase of Roth's life, she started to suffer from what has been described as deep emotional problems. As a consequence, it is believed that her health condition led her to commit suicide.

The Dia Nacional do Orgulho Lésbico, a national day of lesbian pride, celebrated annually throughout Brazil on August 19, since 2003, has been established in her honor.
