= A normalista =

1891 novel by Adolfo Caminha

A normalista is a novel written by the Brazilian writer Adolfo Caminha. It was first published in 1891.
