= Aracati =

Municipality in Ceará, Brazil

- Municipality
- Municipality of Aracati
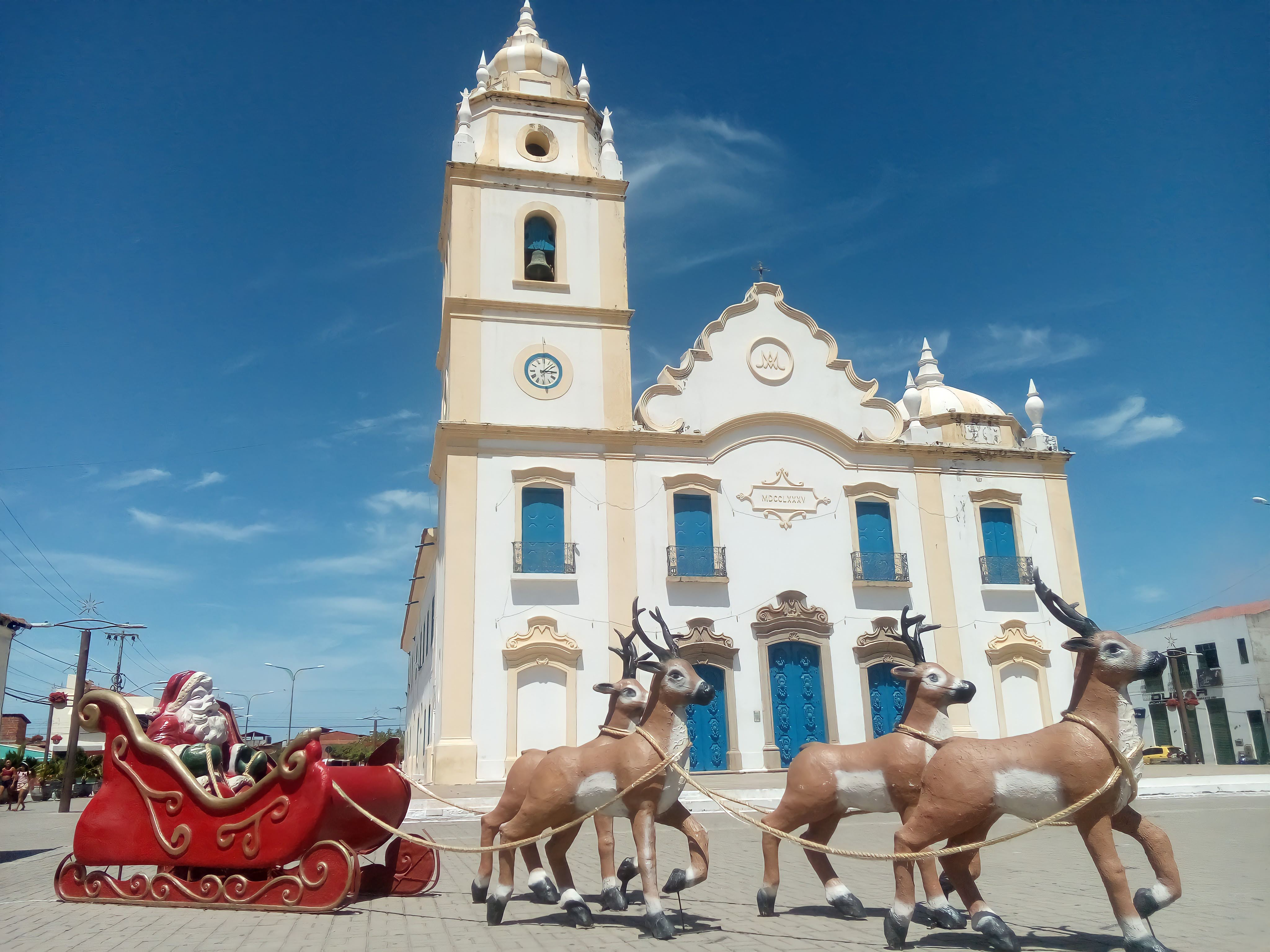
- Church of Our Lady of the Rosary

- Flag Coat of arms
- Nickname: Terra dos Bons Ventos
- Location of Aracati

- Location in Brazil
- Coordinates: 04°33′43″S 37°46′12″W
- Country: Brazil
- Region: North-east
- State: Ceará
- Founded: April 11, 1747

Government
  - Mayor: Bismarck Costa Lima Pinheiro Maia (PTB)

Area
  - Total: 1,228.058 km^{2} (474.156 sq mi)
- Elevation: 5 m (16 ft)

Population (2020)
  - Total: 74,975
  - Density: 56.32/km^{2} (145.9/sq mi)
- Time zone: UTC−3 (BRT)
- CEP: 62800-000
- Area code: 88
- Demonym: aracatiense
- Website: www.aracati.ce.gov.br

Aracati (locally [aˌɾakaˈti]) is a city or municipality in the state of Ceará, in the northeast region of Brazil. The city was officially founded on April 11, 1747. It is part of the microregion of Litoral de Aracati, which is one of the four microregions that make up the macroregion of Jaguaribe. It is the birthplace of the revolutionary Eduardo Angelim, the romanticist Adolfo Caminha, the bishop Manuel do Rego Medeiros, the abolitionist Dragão do Mar, the actor Emiliano Queiroz, the classical pianist Jacques Klein and the writer Yury Teodósio.

The city center of Aracati was named an important historical site in April 2000 by the National Institute of Historic and Artistic Heritage of Brazil. The city has several colonial-period residences, and churches from the 17th and 18th century. The facades of many residential buildings of Aracati have well-preserved examples of azulejo, the blue-white ceramic tiles common in Portuguese colonial architecture.

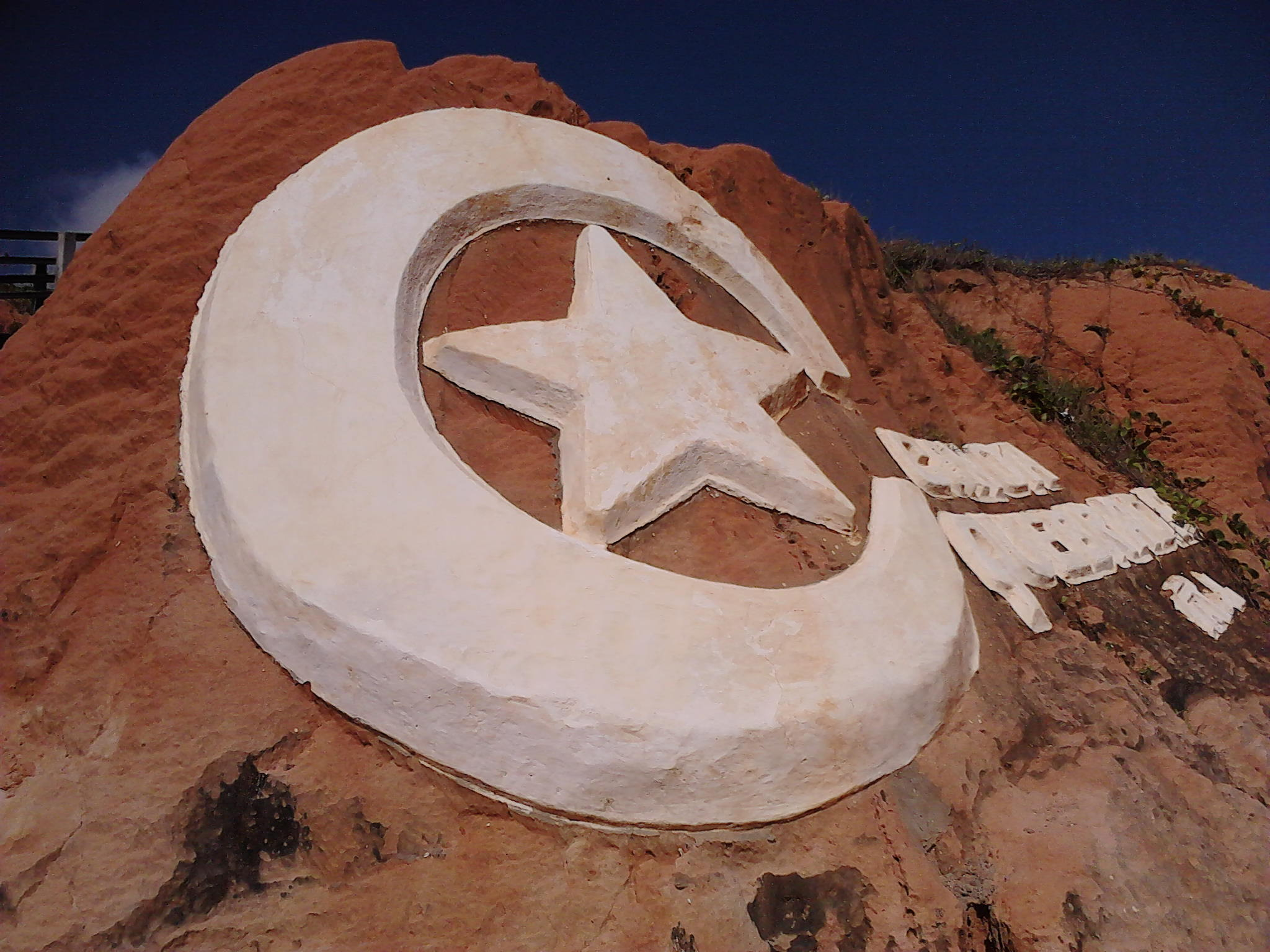
This is the emblem of Canoa Quebrada's Beach

Aracati receives a significant amount of international tourism for its small size, attracted primarily by the quiet and calm life of the coast. Foreign-born residents can be seen living and working more and more frequently in its famous beach of Canoa Quebrada. The beaches of Majorlândia and Quixaba are also important in the region and also offer services such as bars, restaurants, and hotels.

== History ==
The Potiguara, the original inhabitants of the land which Aracati now occupies, probably first came into contact with Europeans on February 2, 1500, on meeting the Spanish navigator Vicente Yáñez Pinzón. On August 10, 1603, during an expedition against the French who had invaded Maranhão, Pero Coelho de Souza erected a fort, Fortim de São Lourenço, on the banks of the Jaguaribe River. The village of Santa Cruz do Aracati arose around this fort.

The economic growth of Aracati was enabled by the creation of workshops or charqueadas in Ceará, which allowed the state to begin competition in the livestock industry. Aracati became a producer of dried meat and the main export port of this product to the sugarcane regions, in addition to continuing to be an important military centre. The main purpose of the Fortim de São Lourenço was now to protect the port, traders and residents against attacks by Indians such as the Payacú. Workshops for preserving meat and leatherwork already existed in Aracati in 1740. On the strength of this trade, Aracati became the economic, political, and social centre of Ceará. By 1779, Aracati had about two thousand people, five streets, many townhouses, and more than seventy stores. On October 25, 1842, the town was officially elevated to the status of a city by Provincial Law 244.

In 1824, during the uprising of the Confederation of Ecuador, the village of Aracati became the scene of one of the most important events in the history of Northeastern Brazil: Tristão Gonçalves de Alencar Araripe led rebel troops in assaulting and sacking the town, staying there for a week.

Throughout its history, the city suffered from the flooding of the Jaguaribe River, until a flood in 1985, motivated the construction of a dike. Buildings destroyed or damaged in floods tended to be rebuilt some distance from the river, to avoid the odors of the cattle industries; over time, this caused the city as a whole to move away from the river responsible for its emergence.

In recent years, tourism has replaced livestock as the city's primary economic activity.

== Transportation ==
The city is served by Canoa Quebrada Dragão do Mar Regional Airport. It opened as a general aviation airport on August 8, 2012, and has no regularly scheduled flights. The Airport is 6 kilometres (3.7 mi) from downtown Aracati and 20 kilometres (12 mi) from Canoa Quebrada.

Two roads give access to Aracati: CE-040 and CE-123.

== Climate ==
Aracati has a typical tropical climate. The temperature generally varies from 20 to 37 °C.

== Media ==
The city has five radio stations: Rádio Canoa FM, Rádio Plus FM, Rádio Sinal FM, Rádio Moriá, Rádio Companhia.

And one television station: TV Sinal.
