= Somos Group =

Brazilian LGBTQ+ group

Somos: Grupo de Afirmação Homossexual (English: We Are: Group of Homosexual Affirmation, shortened to Grupo Somos or Somos) was a Brazilian organization founded in São Paulo. It was the country's first gay liberation group. Somos was active from 1978 to 1983. The group held discussions, raised awareness towards LGBTQ+ activism, released news bulletins, and more. Former members of Somos would go on to start their own organizations.

== Founding ==
Somos was founded in May 1978 in São Paulo, and it was Brazil's first gay liberation group. The organization started as an awareness-raising group called Núcleo de Ação pelos Direitos Homossexuais (English: Nucleus for Actions for Homosexuals' Rights). Some of the group's other activities included discussions, study, artistic activities, militancy, and criticizing the sexism of mainstream tabloids. In September 1978, the organization held a public meeting to increase participation. This resulted in the creation of six subgroups. In December of that year, the organization changed its name to Somos: Grupo de Afirmação Homossexual to gain wider appeal.

== History ==
In February 1979 three members of Somos as well as João Trevisan and Darcy Penteado of Lampião da Espina attended a debate at the University of São Paulo. The debate was about anti-gay sentiment among Brazilian leftists. Days later, Somos held a meeting at a Catholic university. These events helped Somos gain populatity and membership. The Catholic university event especially increased their female membership as the group had just four women the previous year. By halfway through 1979, the group had almost 100 members. The organization had ten consciousness-raising groups, though this did not last. A lack of meeting places and concrete proposals caused the group to decline to 25 members by October. This caused a change in the organization's approach, eventually switching entirely to subgroups. Membership of lesbians, black people, and older people increased.

In January 1980, the organization began releasing a news bulletin called Suruba: um jornal com muito prazer (English: Suruba: A Newspaper with Lots of Pleasure), renamed to O Corpo (English: The Body) after complaints about the name. The bulletins were 14 pages long and contained opinion pieces as well as information about the performance of Somos' subgroups. The subgroups included in O Corpo were research and information, correspondence, publicatications and new proposals.

In April 1980, Somos helped organized the country's First Meeting of Organized Homosexual Groups to take place in São Paulo. The meeting included about 200 activists, and the point of the debate was whether or not to participate in the May Day celebration in São Bernardo. This caused polarization in the group since lesbians were excluded within Orthodox Marxist movents. To avoid the splittering of the organization, 50 members of Somos attended the May Day opening ceremony while everyone else had a picnic at the zoo. Additionally, Somos would hand out pamphlets leading up to the June 13th protest against Operation Cleasing, a police initiative framed as targeting robbers and drug dealers, but was actually used to arrest queer people and sex workers. While Somos was holding a party, after two members alerted the group to the police's targeting after being detained for two hours despite having their documents in order.

== Decline ==
The May Day compromise to keep the group from fracturing did not last. Twelve members of Somos left after May Day, claiming the group had come under the influence of the Socialist Convergence, which at the time was the only explicitly pro-gay left wing organization with queer member. Many women also split off to form a women's only group in 1981 called Grupo de Ação Lésbica-Feminista (English: Lesbian Feminist Action Group, abbreviated as GALF). GALF felt that while their oppression had some commonality with that of gay men, it was also different due to how society treats women and lesbians.

As more activists left, they went on to form study groups which would also dissolve. Some former Somos members created an experimental group called Coletivo Alegria-Alegria (English: Joy-Joy Collective), but it did not last long. Somos' leadership changed and the organization rented a new headquarters building in Bela Vista. Somos tried to connect with other groups struggling to change society for minorities or in general. The organization reached out to ghettoized communities with public debates, parties, and the creation of a film club.

Somos' members experienced a socioeconomic decline. Those who joined the organization for social connection would be drawn away as commercial venues aimed towards gay people increased. As the group became less affluent, members would leave to do inexpensive social activities like bars, clubs, saunas.

In 1982, Somos participated in debates for Brazil's electoral campaign. That year, the group also participated in a campaign promoted by Grupo Gay da Bahia (English: Gay Group of Bahia); the campaign fought against the National Institute for Medical Assistance and Social Security's classification of homosexuality as a disorder and sexual deviation. Somos ultimately dissolved in 1983 due to financial issues and a lack of new members.

== See also ==
- James N. Green
- Timeline of LGBTQ history in Brazil
- LGBTQ movements in Brazil
- LGBTQ rights in São Paulo
