= Míriam Martinho =

Brazilian journalist

- Born: Míriam Martinho Rodrigues; 1954 (age 71–72); Rio de Janeiro, Brazil
- Occupation: activist
- Known for: feminism journalism, LGBT activism

Míriam Martinho (born 1954) is one of the leading feminists in Brazil and part of the second generation of feminist journalists, who emerged in the 1980s. She was one of the first people to bring lesbianism openly into the fold of feminism and founded one of the first Lesbian-Feminist organizations in the country. She and Rosely Roth gained recognition for staging a protest, known at the "Brazilian Stonewall" at Ferro's Bar in 1983. She has written for numerous LGBT and feminist journals and has submitted expert testimony on the state of the LGBT community in Brazil.

== Biography ==
Míriam Martinho was born in 1954 in Rio de Janeiro and grew up in the city of São Paulo. She is one of the pioneering figures of feminism in Brazil and the Brazilian Homosexual Movement.

The feminist movement in Brazil, became fairly active in 1975. After the II Congress of the Paulista Women there was a split between leftist leaders and feminists. At that time, feminists were supporting the concept of gender, rather than class, as a focus for political empowerment and equality. The schism resulted in the feminists moving forward on their own and a flurry of magazines and critical thought on feminism emerged. Many feminist organizations were founded each with specific themes: education, health, political empowerment, sexuality, violence, among others. Martinho was part of this movement, founding the first lesbian feminist group, Grupo Lésbico-Feminista, in 1979. In 1981 the group disbanded and part of the members went on to form the Grupo Ação Lésbica-Feminista (GALF), the most active of whom were Martinho and Rosely Roth. In 1989, GALF reformed, as an NGO called Um Outro Olhar.

In 1981, Martinho began producing an activist newspaper called "ChanacomChana" as the voice of GALF. Sometimes it was produced triannually and sometimes quarterly, but it circulated through the 1980s. It was the first journal to expand the idea of including lesbians in the feminist movement, which was seen as very radical at the time. In 1989, when GALF was formed as an NGO, the journal changed its name to coincide with that of the NGO, "Um Outro Olhar" and it primary began to focus on LGBT issues with feminism as a secondary focus.

The publication "ChanacomChana" was directly responsible for the event that has been called the "Brazilian Stonewall". On 19 August 1983, a protest was held against Ferro's Bar, known for its lesbian clientele, in São Paulo, because they refused to allow ChanacomChana to be distributed. Martinho and Roth staged a demonstration, calling together artists, intellectuals and lawyers, to protest. According to Martinho, the difficulty started almost a month earlier when the owners ejected she and Roth for trying to distribute the paper in the bar. There was a physical altercation and they were banned from distributing the paper. They planned the demonstration to protest the ban and got a lot of press coverage because their approach was pro-active and non-violent, but also because they were open about fighting for their rights in a time when many lesbians were in hiding. After the protest, the bar developed an even larger lesbian following.

Since the 1990s, Martinho has been involved in an endeavor to improve the health care provided to women, but especially lesbians. As many of them do not disclose their status to health practitioners, she feels they are extremely vulnerable. In 2003, she presented research for periodic review of the state of the LGBT population in Brazil. Her report was highlighted by the US State Department and the Immigration and Refugee Board of Canada in their evaluation.

Martinho works as a journalist and serves at the editor in chief of the websites Umoutroolhar and Contraocorodoscontentes two of the most important portals of Intelligentsia Lesbian in Brazil.

== Honors ==
- Ninth Conference Internacional do Serviço de Informação Lesbian International-ILIS. Geneva, Switzerland 28 al March 31, 1986
- I Encontro Lesbian-Feminist Latin-American and Caribbean do. Taxco, Mexico, 1987
- Reunião of Reflexão Lesbian-Homossexual. Santiago, Chile, November 1992

== Selected works ==
- Martinho, Míriam. “As lésbicas também são gays,” Boletim do Grupo Gay da Bahia Vol. 6, No. 12: Brazil (1986) p 1 (In Portuguese)
- Martinho, Míriam. “1979-1989: 10 Anos de Movimentação Lésbica no Brasil”, Um Ooutro Olhar Vol. 9: Brazil (1990), pp 8–17 (In Portuguese)
- Martinho, Mírian. “Lésbicas Em Borinquen: III Encontro de Lésbicas Feministas Latino-Americanas e do Caribe” Um Outro Olhar Vol. 19/20 No. 7: Brazil (Fall/Winter 1993) pp 24–26
- Martinho, Míriam. Prazer sem Medo: informçôes para mulheres que transam com mujeres, Rede de Informaçâo Um Outro Olhar: São Paulo, Brazil (1995) (In Portuguese) (In Portuguese)
- Martinho, Míriam. "Lesbian Life Today" pp 13–23 in Rosenbloom, Rachel. (Editor) Unspoken Rules: Sexual Orientation and Women's Human Rights, Cassell Publishing: London (1996) (in English) (ISBN 978-0-304-33764-4)
- Martinho Rodrigues, Míriam. IX Encontro Brasileiro de Gays, Lésbicas e Travestis = II Encontro Brasileiro de Gays, Lésbicas e Travestus que Trabalham com AIDS, Rede de Informação Um Outro Olhar: São Paulo, Brazil (1998) (In Portuguese)
- Martinho, Míriam. A brief history of the Lesbian Movement in Brazil IGLHRC: Brazil (2003) (in English)
