= Sexual Diversity Museum =

Museum in São Paulo

Museum of Sexual Diversity
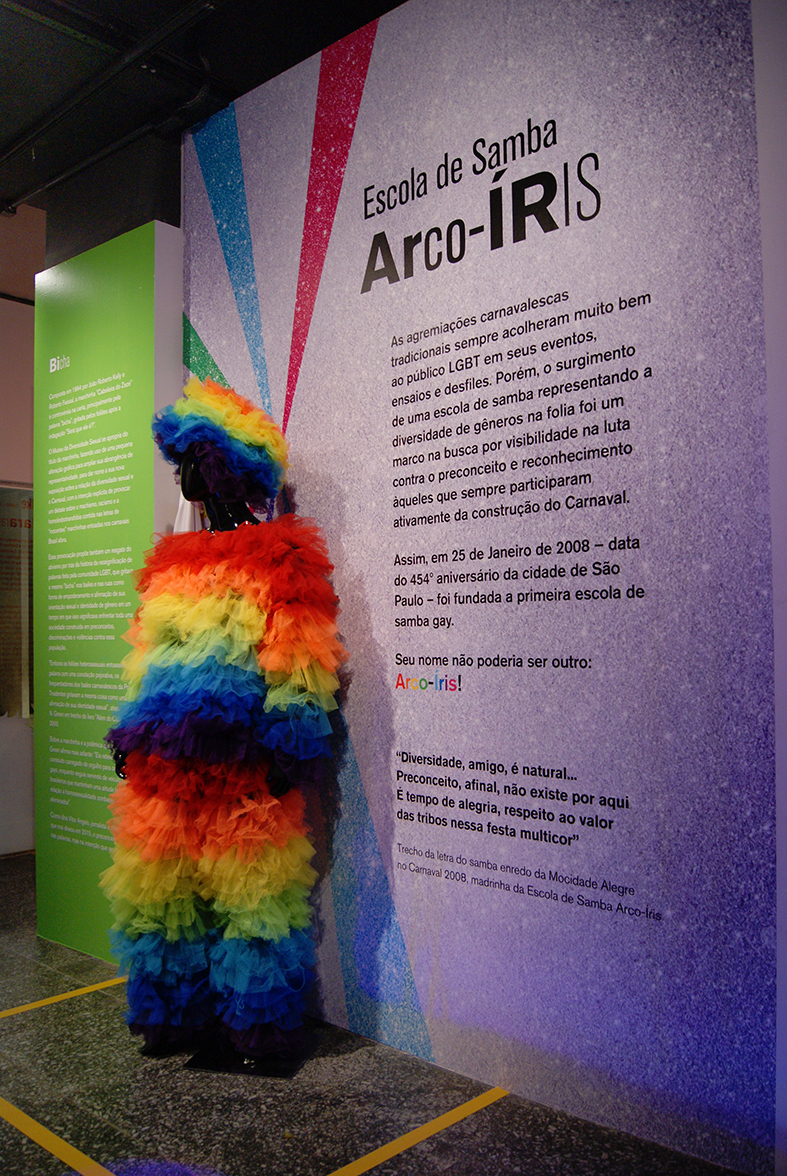
- Established: 2012
- Location: São Paulo, Brazil

The Museum of Sexual Diversity (Brazilian Portuguese: Museu da Diversidade Sexual, MDS) is a museum created in 2012 by the Secretariat of Culture and Creative Economy of the State of São Paulo, with the aim of promoting the culture of the LGBT population in Brazil. The museum offers temporary and traveling exhibitions that visit other cities in the state of São Paulo. The exhibitions are composed of images, photographs, objects, and videos, created by artists who discuss LGBT themes, and who find it difficult to exhibit their art in other venues.

== History ==
The museum was created on 25 May 2012, in accordance with Decree 58.075 of the Secretariat of Culture of the State of São Paulo as a Center for Culture, Memory, and Studies of Sexual Diversity in the State of São Paulo, located at the República of the metro. It is the first museum in Latin America and the entire southern hemisphere with this theme. The museum's purpose is to preserve the history and culture of the LGBT community, as well as to highlight the importance of sexual diversity in the social and cultural construction of Brazil. The museum focuses on creating space for artists who discuss this topic, along with political activism and sociocultural legacy, and to preserve and disseminate the memory of LGBT culture. Through traveling exhibitions, the museum also promotes and disseminates exhibitions in other cities of the State of São Paulo and works in partnership with organizations that promote discussion against homophobia, such as the exhibition "Homophobia out of fashion", held in partnership with the House of Creators and the exhibition "OT da Questão", in commemoration of the International Transgender Day of Visibility, in partnership with the Department of Defense and Citizen Justice.

=== Museum plans ===
In 2014, the Secretariat of Culture of the State of São Paulo created a competition in ProAC to transfer the museum to the Residência Joaquim Franco de Melo, located on Paulista Avenue, as part of the Support Contest for Restoration Projects of Listed Buildings by Council for the Defense of Historical, Archaeological, Artistic and Tourist Heritage (Condephaat). The new project includes areas for collections, administration, cafeteria, theater, and an event space. The property is in a state of decay, lacking necessary maintenance funding, which is why the project requires restoration work by Hereñu + Ferroni Arquitetos, the winning company of the competition. However, the property is in litigation in court, making the implementation of the museum at this location impossible. Currently, the property remains a private residence and the São Paulo LGBT Pride Parade Association promotes a petition for the São Paulo City Hall to continue this project.

=== Closure and reopening ===
Due to a complaint from state deputy Gil Diniz (PL) about alleged irregularities in the contract between the Secretariat of Culture of the State of São Paulo and the Odeon Institute to manage the venue housing the museum, the State Court of Justice announced the suspension of said contract. As a result, the museum announced its closure on 29 April 2022.

On 31 August 2022, the São Paulo court ordered the reopening of the museum after overturning the April decision as a result of the appeal filed by the state government. The Museum of Sexual Diversity officially reopened on September 2 with the exhibition "Duo Drag". On December 28 of the same year, the start of the museum's expansion works was announced, which will increase its area from 100 m² to 540 m² with a total investment of 5 million reais.

== The museum ==
The museum is located near the República Metro Station. It is a non-profit social organization linked to the Gender and Ethnic Cultural Advisory Office of the São Paulo Department of Culture. It was created to preserve the social, political, and cultural heritage of the LGBT community in Brazil. It presents material and immaterial references about the LGBT trajectory. It seeks to raise public awareness about the importance of respecting and valuing sexual diversity. Its exhibitions are temporary and very dynamic, including exhibitions such as “LGBT Representations in Brazilian Music” held on October 8 and 15, 2016, relating MPB and sexual diversity, and “Caio Mon Amour”, created in honor of the 20th anniversary of the death of writer Caio Fernando Abreu, aiming to spread the importance of reinforcing the existence of well-known homosexual authors in literature.
