= Chanacomchana =

Brazilian LGBT collective publication

Chanacomchana was an independent publication in bulletin format, zine, by the São Paulo collectives Lésbico-Feminista and Grupo Ação Lésbico-Feminista (GALF), which played an important role in the political organization and resistance of the Lesbian community during the 1980s in Brazil. The content of the bulletin brought together progressive and revolutionary collages and focused on women's issues, especially lesbians, through the dissemination of activities and reflections relevant to the community.

Edition Zero was the only one produced in newspaper format. It preceded a publication hiatus of more than a year until it was produced again in a reduced format at the end of 1982. Thereafter, the new name was Boletim Chanacomchana. "Through articles investigated and questioned the places occupied by lesbians in society, interviews that sought to bring silenced voices to light, to the publications of letters that formed extensive forums for discussion, meeting and flirting, poetry and lesbian literature and formats that finally put the lesbian experience in focus, Chanacomchana represented homosexuals inaugural space in writing their own history and demarcating an identity powerful and political".

The publication existed until 1987. Its last editions explored important themes at the time such as the AIDS pandemic, the Amnesty law, and debate on the Constituent assembly.

== History ==
Boletim Chanacomchana was first published in 1981, by the lesbian wing of Somos group, and it was published again by GALF in 1982. During a conservative period, at the end of Military dictatorship in Brazil. The circulation of the publication became difficult among lesbian women themselves, who were afraid of receiving a magazine with a name that suggested their sexual identity. As such, the GALF founders Rosely Roth, who died in 1990, and Miriam Martinho began to sell Chanacomchana in front of Ferro's Bar which was a meeting place for lesbians at the time.

=== The Ferro's Bar demonstration ===
Situated on Rua Martinho Prado in front of the Jewish Museum of São Paulo, Ferro's Bar was previously frequented by communist militants. However, during the Military coup in the 1960s, it became an important place for the meetings of the LGBT in the city. Although, in 1983, the then owner of the bar tried to gradually ban the circulation of Chanacomchana and expel its activists from the place.

According to Míriam Martinho, the bar's owner did not like the publication. "The reason they started picking on people was because the bulletin was very explicit, explicitly lesbian, even at the time when everyone was in the closet. That hypocritical thing 'you can be here as long as you pretend you're not homosexual' was going on there too. The bar was supported by lesbians, but we couldn't have any overt expressions of affection. Just imagine a news letter called Chanacomchana."

In response to the frequent violent expulsions, on 19 August 1983, the Brazilian Stonewall protest began. The GALF activists organized themselves to bring other LGBT groups, feminists and political figures, including the then deputy Eduardo Suplicy. The activists invaded Ferro's bar and read a lesbian manifesto against the bar's censorship. The activists demanded that the sale of the newspaper be permitted and respected.

The event was a milestone in the history of the fight for LGBT rights in Brazil, and the Lesbian Pride Day is celebrated in its memory.
