= Brasil Sem Homofobia =

Pro-LGBT campaign established by the Brazilian government

Brazil Without Homophobia (Portuguese: Brasil Sem Homofobia; BWH), also pejoratively known as Gay Kit (Portuguese: Kit Gay), is a non-governmental initiative launched in 2004 by the Special Secretariat for Human Rights meant to tackle homophobia through public policy.

== History ==
The federal government, through different ministries, works with non-governmental civil society organizations to combat violence and discrimination, promote rights and promote citizenship for the LGBTQ population. In 1928, sex ed became mandatory due to the concern of safe sex, and being gay. Up until the 19th century, one could serve jail time for being homosexual, and it was still considered a mental illness until 1985. It was not until 2013 that same-sex marriage was legalized, and up until 1997, sex-change surgery was illegal, and doctors would be charged with malpractice.

=== 1988 Constitution ===
The 1988 Constitution of Brazil was created on October 5, 1988. This document addressed women's rights and minority rights. The structure of the constitution puts a large amount of focus on human rights, which paved the way for future legislature that involved specifically LGBT rights.

== Program ==
National conferences to promote unity between the state and the people were held in 2008 and 2011. The main goals are to:

- reinforce non-governmental institutions to battle homophobia and encourage LGBT citizens
- support members of the movements and provide education to defend the rights of citizens
- educate citizens on the rights that they have
- encourage a positive self-image, and push-back against any abuse of the rights that they have.

The program operates under the following principles:

- ensuring that public policy is made by many Ministries and Secretaries that do not discriminate against LGBT
- making accessible an education of the version of policies to be put in place about the violence and discrimination that specifically LGBT people face
- reassurance that human rights include combating homophobia, and that the State of Brazil, along with society, is committed to the eradication of these violations of human rights.

The program has been critiqued for not being as sustainable and conducive of large-scale social change due to lack of funding and focus on locality. In general, Brazil's federal system gives the Ministry of Education less power when it comes to curriculum, and more power when it comes to creating policies concerning guidelines and directions. Growing conservatism from religious organizations in opposition to Brazil without Homophobia has also been a challenge. Evangelical Congressional groups called for the suspension of distribution of educational materials for its sexual diversity programs. These programs were in partnership with the Global Alliance for LGBT Education (GALE) and two non-governmental organizations, Pathfinder and Bra. President Rousseff cancelled the distribution on television, taking heat for her choice. Activists began supporting the Workers' Party's development of LGBT rights. Conservatism was a key reason that the Ministries of Health Education did not install condom dispensers in secondary schools with sexual diversity even though the technical staff had approved it, although the technical staff approved an HIV prevention campaign targeting gay men in the 2012 Carnival: the campaign was cancelled.

From these conferences held in 2008 and 2011 came the First National Conference of Gays, Lesbians, Bisexuals, travestis, and Transsexuals, which was held in June of 2008. In 2009, the Inter-Ministerial Technical Commission created the National Plan for the Promotion of LGBT Citizenship and Human Rights in order to battle stereotypes and discrimination on the basis of gender or sexuality, and to start writing policies to encourage human rights, and discourage homophobia. The Special Secretariat for Human Rights helped with the creation of human rights referral centers, which prevent and combat violence caused by homophobia and provides aid to victims.

== Education ==
The Brazilian Ministry of Education's efforts to address discrimination and violence in the public school system began in the mid-1990s with initiatives at the state and municipal level. In December of 1996, Brazil instituted a national curriculum. The curriculum was made to create inclusive environments, and made sex ed mandatory in schools. The ministry worked to eliminate homophobia by trying to implement workshops and classes for state school teachers about preventing homophobia and respecting sexual diversity as a part of this curriculum.

The Brazilian Ministry of Education implements educational policies stemming from Brazil without Homophobia during national conferences, birthing the "Schools without Homophobia" program (Portuguese: Escolas sem Homofobia) in 2008, which was signed by the National Education Development Fund. They provide subsidies to teachers with pedagogical material in order to address the issues of homophobia within the school system. In part of the effort, The Brazilian Ministry of Education funded a nationwide study that found various acts of homophobic violence and humiliation in 501 public schools. This violence and humiliation explains why travestis in high school often feel excluded and struggle with attendance.

The initiative became famous in 2011 when then federal deputy Jair Bolsonaro referred to it as "gay kit" (Portuguese: kit gay, pronounced [ˈkitʃi ɡej]). It was staunchly opposed by the Evangelical Parliamentary Front, who protocolled a requirement to evaluate whether the materials before distributing them to schools. João Campos, leader of the front, accused the program of promoting free sex and homosexuality. The front also called for a parliamentary inquiry commission and the exonerations of then Ministry of Education, Fernando Haddad. In 2011, there was an inflammatory campaign against the program, where Evangelical Christians publicly protested. Three days after the manifestation, the distribution of the material was cancelled.

In 2012, José Serra, then the PSDB candidate for mayor of São Paulo and Haddad's rival, condemned the material, classifying it as an apology for bisexuality.

=== Le Guide du zizi sexuel ===
A point of controversy involved the French book Le Guide du zizi sexuel, which, according to Jair Bolsonaro on television programs, was being distributed by the Ministry of Education (MEC). Bolsonaro also claims that the work was included in a supposed "Children's LGBT Seminar," which was actually the ninth edition of the annual event "LGBT Seminar in the National Congress." The event took place in May 2012 and had as its theme "Childhood and Sexuality" and was organized by the Mixed Parliamentary Front for LGBT Citizenship, with the participation of experts in Law, Education, Sexuality, Psychology and Culture and had no direct relation to the MEC's Brazil Without Homophobia program.

According to the press office of the publisher Companhia das Letras, the French book "was never purchased by the MEC, nor was it part of any alleged 'gay kit'. The Ministry of Culture [another ministry] purchased 28 copies in 2011, intended for public libraries." Regarding the matter, the MEC issued the following statement:

The Ministry of Education (MEC) informs, in a statement, that it did not produce, acquire, or distribute the book Le Guide du zizi sexuel, which, according to a video circulating on social media, would be inappropriate for Brazilian children and young people. The MEC further states that there is no connection whatsoever between the ministry and the book, as the work is not included in the programs for distributing educational materials carried out by the ministry. The video circulating on social media claims that the government distributed it and, therefore, is "prematurely encouraging children to become interested in sex." (...) The video presenting the works as being from the MEC, at no point, proves the Ministry's connection to the cited materials, precisely because this connection does not exist.

In 2018, the Superior Electoral Court (TSE) ruled that the book was never associated with the Ministry of Education (MEC) nor was it ever part of the Brazil Without Homophobia program, which was never even implemented. During that year's presidential elections, the body ordered the removal of videos claiming that the book had been distributed by government programs while Fernando Haddad held the position of Minister of Education. The complaint targeted Jair Bolsonaro and his sons Carlos and Flávio Bolsonaro. According to Minister Carlos Bastide Horbach, the videos constitute "the dissemination of a knowingly false fact by the represented candidate and his supporters, in various posts made on social networks," which "generates misinformation during the electoral period, harming the political debate."
