= Bom-Crioulo =

Book by Adolfo Caminha

- Author: Adolfo Caminha
- Language: Portuguese
- Genre: Erotic fiction
- Published: 1895
- Publisher: Ática

Bom-Crioulo: The Black Man and the Cabin Boy (Portuguese: Bom-Crioulo) is a novel by the Brazilian writer Adolfo Caminha, first published in 1895. An English translation by E.A. Lacey was published in 1982 by Gay Sunshine.

The novel, whose narrative follows the character Amaro, an ex-slave who works for the Navy and who, at a given moment, falls in love with the young cabin boy Aleixo, was the first major literary work on homosexuality to be published in Brazil, and one of the first to have a black person as its hero. The novel caused a stir upon its publication but was almost forgotten in the first half of the 20th century. In the second half of the 20th century, the novel has been republished several times in Brazil and translated into English, Spanish, German, French and Italian.

While most view the novel as a positive example of social progress in Brazil, the novel actually displays significant nihilism and cynicism on the topic, declaring "não há lugar para a existência do negro e do homossexual que não o ghetto ou a morte", which in English means "there is no place for the existence of the black man nor the homosexual if not the ghetto or in death".
