= Luiz Mott =

Brazilian anthropologist and activist (born 1946)

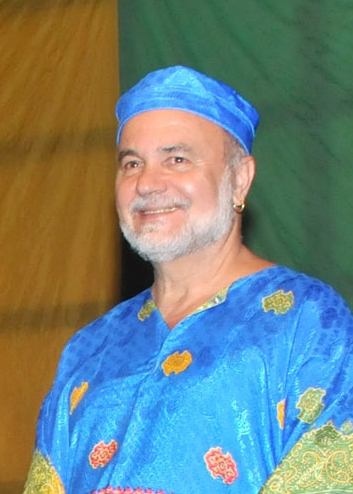
Mott in Brasília, 2010.

Luiz Roberto de Barros Mott or Luiz Mott (born 6 May 1946) in São Paulo, is an anthropologist and a gay rights activist in Brazil.

== Early life ==
Luiz Mott graduated with a degree in Social Sciences from the University of São Paulo (USP) during the military regime, obtained a master's degree in Ethnography from the Sorbonne and a doctorate in anthropology from the University of Campinas in São Paulo.

== Career ==
Luiz Mott is professor emeritus of the Department of Anthropology of the Federal University of Bahia (UFBA). In his work Mott has traced homosexual desire in a number of indigenous Brazilian tribes such as the Bororo, Guató, Trumai, Tupinambá, Wai Wai and Xavante. He has also explored intimate partner violence between gay, transsexual and transgender people in Salvador, the capital of the Brazilian state of Bahia. In 1995, he declared that national hero Zumbi dos Palmares had been gay.

Alongside his academic work, Mott is also a gay rights activist and founded the Gay Group of Bahia in 1980. It was the first homosexual support group in Bahia and Mott ensured its survival by pressuring the municipal government to fund it. It published records of homophobic attacks, raised awareness of HIV/AIDS and organised a pride parade, workshops, educational events and protests. He also created Centro Baiano Anti-AIDS.

In 1993, he published the first account of the life of Rosa Egipcíaca, a religious mystic and formerly enslaved prostitute, who wrote the book Sagrada Teologia do Amor Divino das Almas Peregrinas, which was the first book to be written by a black woman in Brazil.

In 1995, he was awarded the Felipa de Souza Award by the International Gay and Lesbian Human Rights Commission (now OutRight Action International). Mott commented to the Los Angeles Times in 2015: "Brazil is an extremely contradictory country. On the one hand, we are a pink country, celebrating sexual diversity [..] then, there is another color, the red blood of victims."
