= Adolfo Caminha =

Brazilian Naturalist novelist

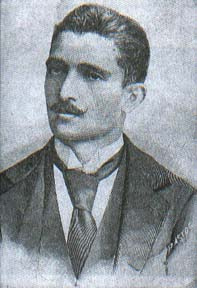
- A photograph depicting Caminha
- Born: Adolfo Ferreira Caminha; 29 May 1867; Aracati, Ceará, Empire of Brazil
- Died: 1 January 1897 (aged 29); Rio de Janeiro City, Brazil
- Occupations: novelist, short story writer, poet
- Writing career
- Pen name: Félix Guanabarino
- Notable works: A Normalista, Bom-Crioulo
- Literary movement: Naturalism

Adolfo Ferreira Caminha (May 29, 1867 – January 1, 1897) was a Brazilian Naturalist novelist, famous for his polemical novel Bom-Crioulo, which deals with race and homosexuality.

== Life ==
Caminha was born in Aracati in 1867, to Raimundo Ferreira dos Santos and Maria Firmina Caminha. Orphaned when he was 10 years old, he went to live with his uncle in Fortaleza. In 1883, he moved to Rio de Janeiro, where another relative of his matriculated him in a naval school. In 1886, he published his first book: Voos Incertos (Uncertain Flights). In the same year, he made an instruction trip to the United States.

In 1887 he was promoted to Second Lieutenant and published the short story books Judite and Lágrimas de um Crente (Tears of a Believer). In 1888 he returned to Fortaleza, but got involved on a scandal where he eloped with an alférez's daughter. They had two daughters, and fled to Rio de Janeiro, where Caminha spent his life as a civil servant.

By 1891, Caminha was working on journals such as the Jornal do Commercio, Gazeta de Notícias and O País, using the pseudonym Félix Guanabarino. He also published the novel A Normalista. In 1894, he published an account of his travel to the U.S.A., entitled No País dos Ianques (In the Country of the Yankees). In 1895, he published his controversial novel Bom-Crioulo and Cartas Literárias. In 1896, he founded a journal named Nova Revista, and published the novel Tentação.

Poor and debilitated by tuberculosis, he died at only 29 years old, leaving unfinished two novels.

== Works ==
=== Poetry ===
- Voos Incertos (1886)

=== Short stories ===
- Judite (1887)
- Lágrimas de um Crente (1887)

=== Novels ===
- A Normalista (1891)
- Bom-Crioulo (1895)
- Cartas Literárias (1895)
- Tentação (1896)

=== Other ===
- No País dos Ianques (1894)

=== Unfinished works ===
- Ângelo
- O Emigrado
