= Peter H. Smith =

American academic

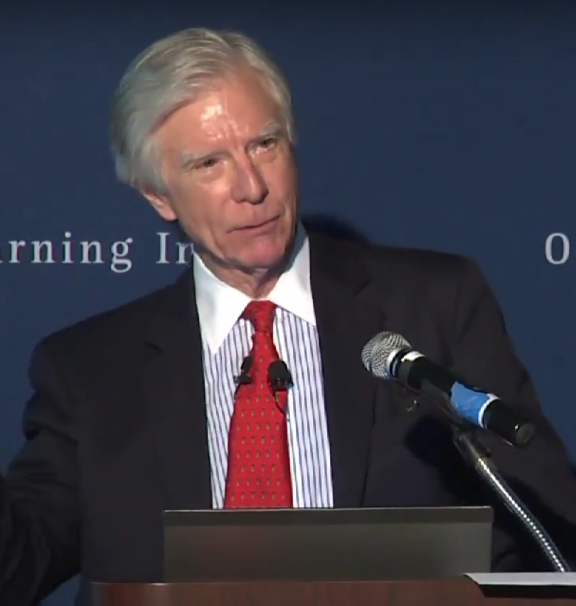
Smith during "MEXICO: 20 Years After NAFTA" conference.

Peter Hopkinson Smith (born January 17, 1940) is a scholar of Latin American history, politics, economics, and diplomacy. He is a distinguished professor emeritus of Political Science and the Simon Bolivar Professor of Latin American Studies at University of California, San Diego. He previously served as a professor of history and department chairman at the University of Wisconsin–Madison and as professor and dean at the Massachusetts Institute of Technology.

He has been president of the Latin American Studies Association and has also been director of the Center for Iberian and Latin American Studies (1989–2001) and director of Latin American Studies (1994–2001) at UCSD.

== Education ==
Smith obtained his Ph.D. in Comparative Politics, Latin America from Columbia University in 1966.

== Publications ==
His books have appeared in numerous editions and have been translated into Spanish, Portuguese, Korean, and Chinese. Some of his publications include:

- Politics and Beef in Argentina: Patterns of Conflict and Change (1969)
- Argentina and the Failure of Democracy: Conflict among Political Elites, 1904-1955 (1974)
- Labyrinths of Power: Political Recruitment in Twentieth-Century Mexico (1979)
- Talons of the Eagle: Dynamics of U.S.-Latin American Relations (1996; 2nd edition, 2000; 3rd edition, 2007; 4th edition, 2011; 5th edition, 2021)
- Democracy in Latin America: Political Change in Comparative Perspective (2005)
- Modern Latin America, co-authored (1984), now in its ninth edition (2018)
- Drug Policy in the Americas, edited (1992)
- Latin America in Comparative Perspective: New Approaches to Methods and Analysis, edited (1995)
- NAFTA in the New Millennium, edited (2002)
- East Asia and Latin America: The Unlikely Alliance, edited (2003)
- Promises of Empowerment: Women in Asia and Latin America, edited (2004)

Smith's major studies regarding politics, democracy and globalization have been subjects of review essays in leading journals.

== Organizations ==
Smith has been the president of the Latin American Studies Association as well as being the consultant to the Ford Foundation and the John Simon Guggenheim Memorial Foundation. Smith received a lifetime achievement award from the Latin American Studies Association in 2013.
