= Grupo Gay da Bahia =

Brazilian organization for LGBTQ rights

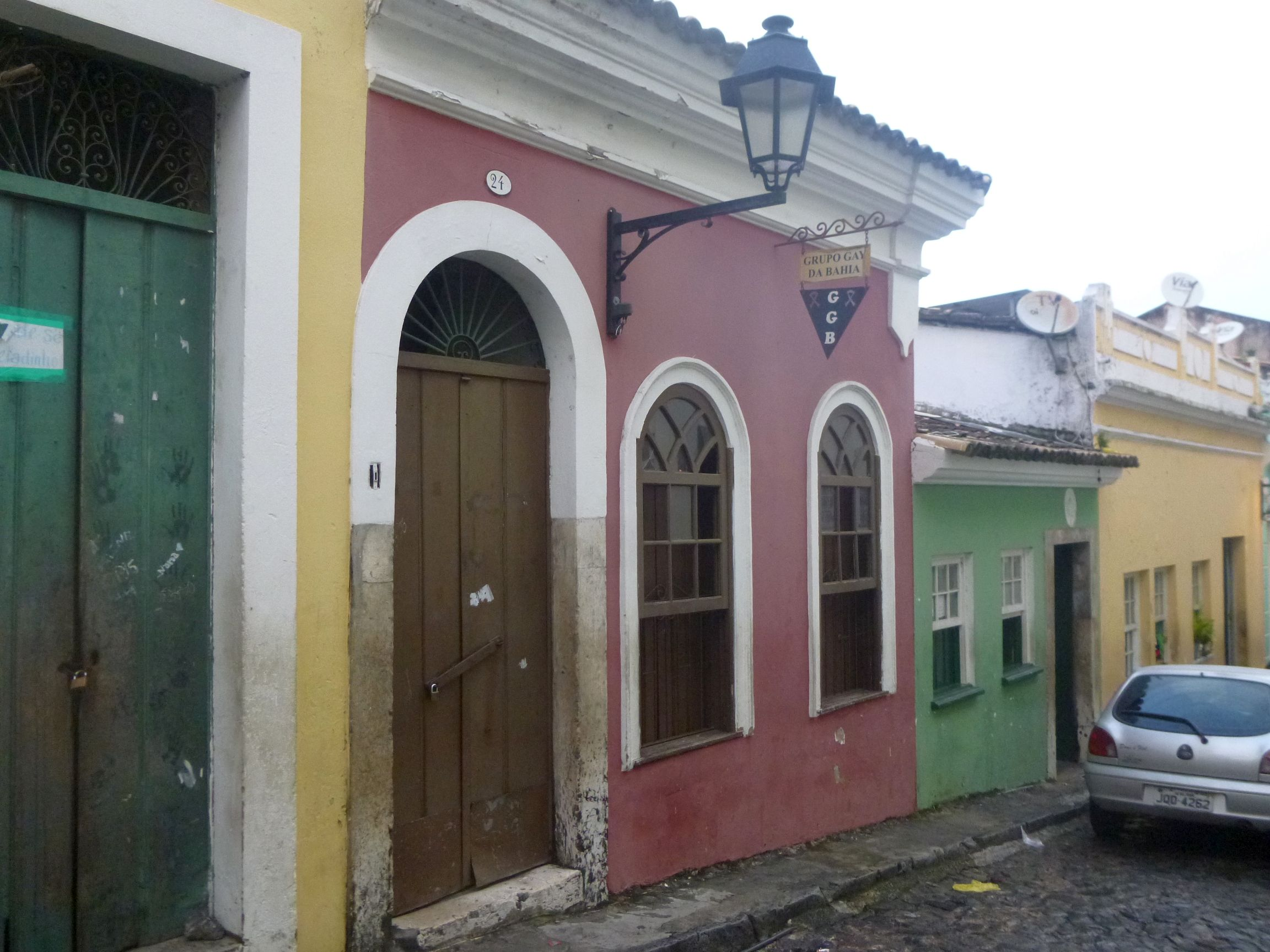
- Formation: 1980
- Founder: Luiz Mott
- Headquarters: Salvador, Bahia
- Leader: Marcelo Cerqueira
- Website: https://grupogaydabahia.com.br/

The Grupo Gay da Bahia (GGB; English: Gay Group of Bahia) is a non-governmental organization (NGO) dedicated to defending LGBTQ rights in Brazil. Founded in 1980, it is the oldest Brazilian association of its kind still in operation. In 1988, the Group was appointed a member of the Ministry of Health's National AIDS Commission and, since 1995, has been a member of the International Gay and Lesbian Human Rights Commission. Its headquarters are in Salvador, in Pelourinho.

Among its founders, gay activist and professor Luiz Mott from the Department of Anthropology at the Federal University of Bahia stands out, who holds a permanent position as Honorary President of the group.

Since its inception, the Group has gained notoriety for aggregating statistics on violence against LGBTQ people in Brazil. In the absence of government surveys, the organization relies on information gathered from the media, online research sites, and direct correspondence sent to the GGB. The reports, published annually, are widely disseminated by various media outlets.

The organization also played an important role in the movement to depathologize homosexuality in Brazil, mobilizing political support for the removal of paragraph 302.0 of the INAMPS Health Code.

== History ==
In 1981, celebrating its first anniversary, the Grupo Gay da Bahia published a summary of the group's actions on behalf of the LGBTQ community. Among its initiatives were a campaign to end homosexuality as a "deviation and mental disorder"; participation in the celebration of International Gay Pride Day, with activities such as lectures, graffiti, and leaflet distribution; and the organization of caravans in various cities in the Northeast region, among others.

In 1982, the Grupo Gay da Bahia published its first bulletin containing a list of LGBT people who had been murdered as a hate crime, entitled Research on Homosexuals Murdered in Brazil (Portuguese: Pesquisa sobre Homossexuais assassinados no Brasil).

In 1991, the institution created the Pink Triangle Award, considered the first LGBTQIA+ award in Brazil.

=== Criticism ===
Critics of the Grupo Gay da Bahia's work accuse the organization of inflating data on the true number of homophobic deaths in Brazil by classifying homosexual deaths as examples of "gay-hate deaths." In 2015, journalist Dario Di Martino produced a case-by-case review of the Grupo Gay da Bahia's 2013 report; in 2017, civil servant Daniel Reynaldo started a blog initially specializing in reviewing cases treated by the GGB as deaths motivated by LGBTphobic hate; later, geneticist Eli Vieira led a case-by-case review of the data from the 2016 report.

== See also ==
- LGBTQ rights in Bahia
- LGBTQ movements in Brazil
