= São Paulo Gay Pride Parade =

Annual LGBT event in Brazil

São Paulo LGBTQ Pride Parade
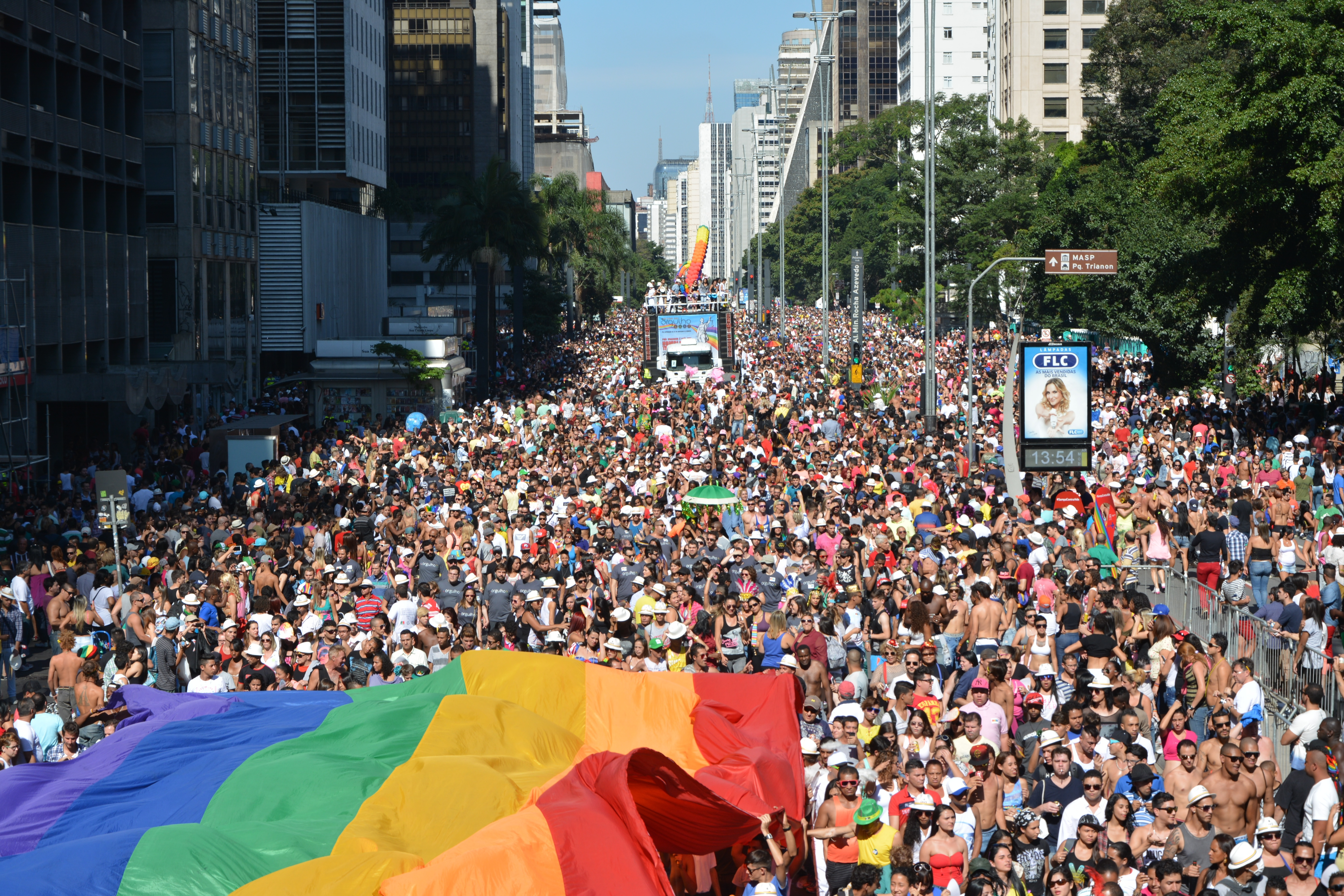
- São Paulo LGBT Pride Parade of 2014
- Date: Sunday after the annual holiday of Corpus Christi
- Frequency: Annually
- Locations: São Paulo, Brazil
- Inaugurated: June 1997
- Most recent: 2 June 2024
- Participants: Over 5 million (2013)

São Paulo LGBTQ Pride Parade (Portuguese: Parada do Orgulho LGBTQ de São Paulo) is an annual gay pride parade that has taken place in Avenida Paulista, in the city of São Paulo, Brazil, since 1997. It is listed by Guinness World Records as the world's largest Pride parade, starting in 2006 with 2.5 million people. They broke the Guinness record in 2009 with four million attendees. They have kept the title from 2006 to at least 2016. They had five million attendants in 2017. As of 2019 it has three to five million attendants each year. In 2019, it was also the second largest event of the city of São Paulo in terms of total revenue (after Carnaval) and the first in terms of daily revenue. In 2010, the city hall of São Paulo invested 1 million reais in the parade. According to the LGBT app Grindr, the gay parade of the city was elected the best in the world.

The São Paulo Gay Pride Parade is heavily supported by the federal government as well as by the Governor of São Paulo and the city mayor. Many politicians show up to open the main event and the government often parades with a float with politicians on top of it. Caixa Econômica Federal, a government bank, and Petrobrás, Brazil's oil firm, have already reaffirmed their commitment to back up the event and its diversity, funding once again the event. In the Pride the city usually receives about 400,000 tourists and moves between R$ 180 million and R$ 190 million. Because of this support, the event has many security measures in place. Since the election of Jair Bolsonaro as president of Brazil in 2018, there has been concern that the federal government would withdraw support for the parade, given Bolsonaro's previous anti-LGBTQ sentiments.

Due to the COVID-19 pandemic, the parade was celebrated virtually in June 2020. The in-person parade was initially postponed until November 29, 2020, but was ultimately cancelled entirely.

The use of Brazil's national symbols during the 2024 parade illustrates how visual expression can become a form of political activism. Participants wore yellow and green, the colors of the Brazilian flag, reclaiming national symbols that had become associated with conservative political movements. This use of national colors demonstrated how the parade could challenge dominant representations of national identity while asserting the LGBTQ community's place within Brazilian society. In 2026, it was reported that funding for the parade fell by 60%, largely due to conservative movements.

The São Paulo LGBTQ Pride Parade has served as a space for political activism, community gathering, and public expressions of LGBTQ identity. Its annual themes reflect changing political and social concerns while providing organizers and participants with a way to communicate their demands to a wider audience.

Beyond its organized political messages, the parade also brings together diverse forms of individual expression. While organizers establish shared themes and political demands, participants engage with the event through dancing, chanting, performances, and other forms of public expression. The coexistence of collective activism and individual participation illustrates the variety of ways LGBTQ people engage with political movements and express their identities. The anthropologist Joseph Jay Sosa describes this duality by using the term "queer choreographies."

"Queer choreographies" are efforts that center LGBTQ+ identities in their practices. In Brazil, this is a way of thinking and expressing one’s identity through habits, conversations, protests, etc., This is especially important during times of repression or regression in the rights of LGBTQ+ people. "Queer choreographies" work to reject the cis-masculine traditions of society while also acting as a form of resistance to respectability politics.

== Participants ==
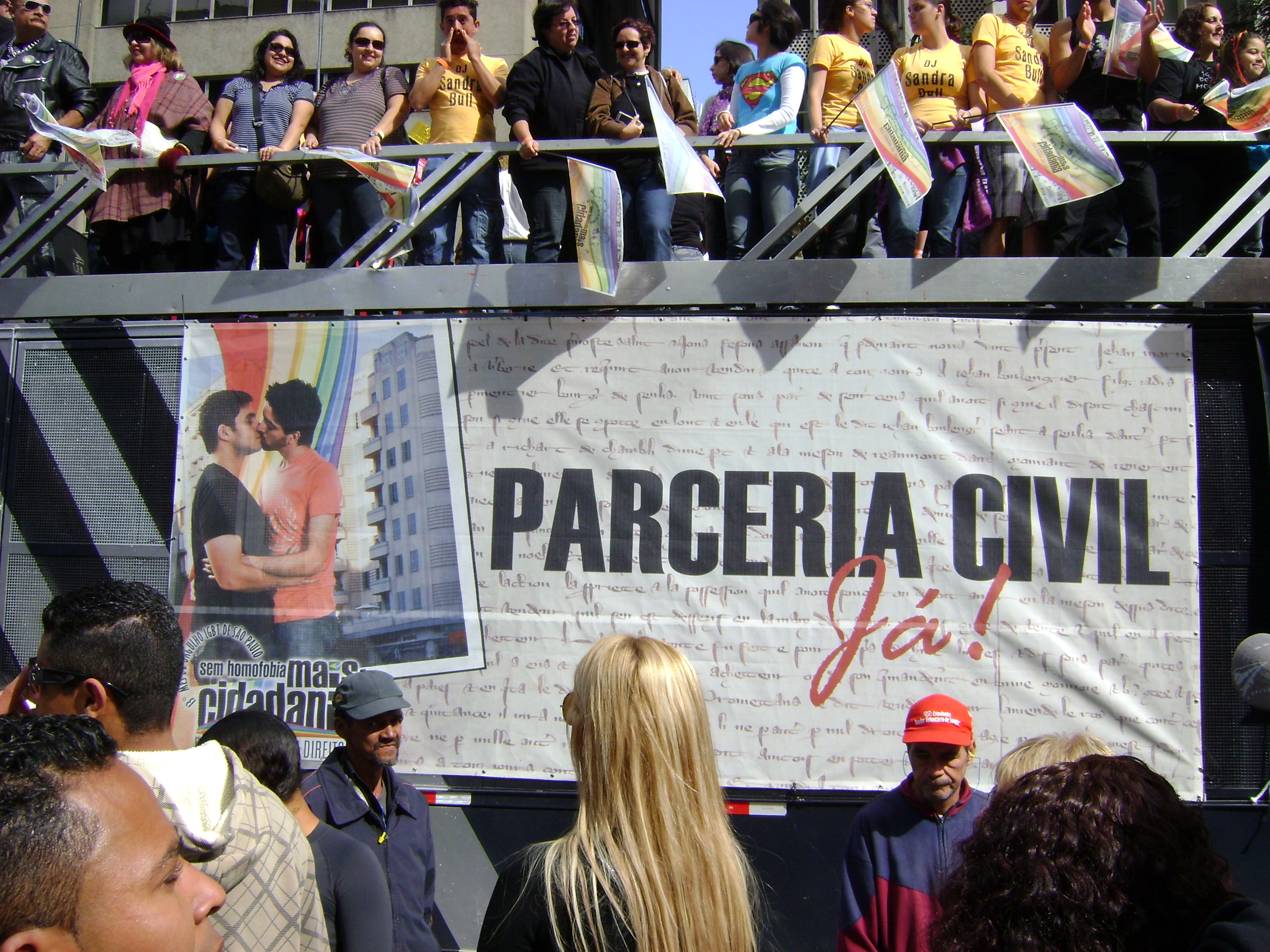
Trio Elétrico during the pride.

The first parade in 1997 gathered around 2,000 participants, according to the military police. The ninth parade gathered over 2.5 million people according to the police and 3 million according to the organizers.

The military police, which traditionally counts the number of participants at major public events, does not release its estimates for attendance at the parade since then, which caused the omission of the Parade from the 2008 issue of Guinness that requires official sources for records regarding attendance at events. According to the police, it would be impossible to count the number of people attending an event with a "floating population." There has been controversy about the exact number of participants.

| Year | Participants | |
| Year | Organizers | Military Police |
|---|---|---|
| 1997 | 2,000 | 2,000 |
| 1998 | 8,000 | 8,000 |
| 1999 | 35,000 | 35,000 |
| 2000 | 120,000 | 100,000 |
| 2001 | 250,000 | 200,000 |
| 2002 | 500,000 | 400,000 |
| 2003 | 1,000,000 | 800,000 |
| 2004 | 1,800,000 | 1,500,000 |
| 2005 | 2,500,000 | 1,800,000 |
| 2006 | 3,000,000 | 2,500,000 |
| 2007 | 3,500,000 | – |
| 2008 | 3,400,000 | – |
| 2009 | 3,100,000 | – |
| 2010 | 3,300,000 | – |
| 2011 | 4,100,000 | – |
| 2012 | 4,200,000 | 270,000 |
| 2013 | 5,000,000 | 220,000 |
| 2019 | 3,000,000 | |

== Slogans ==
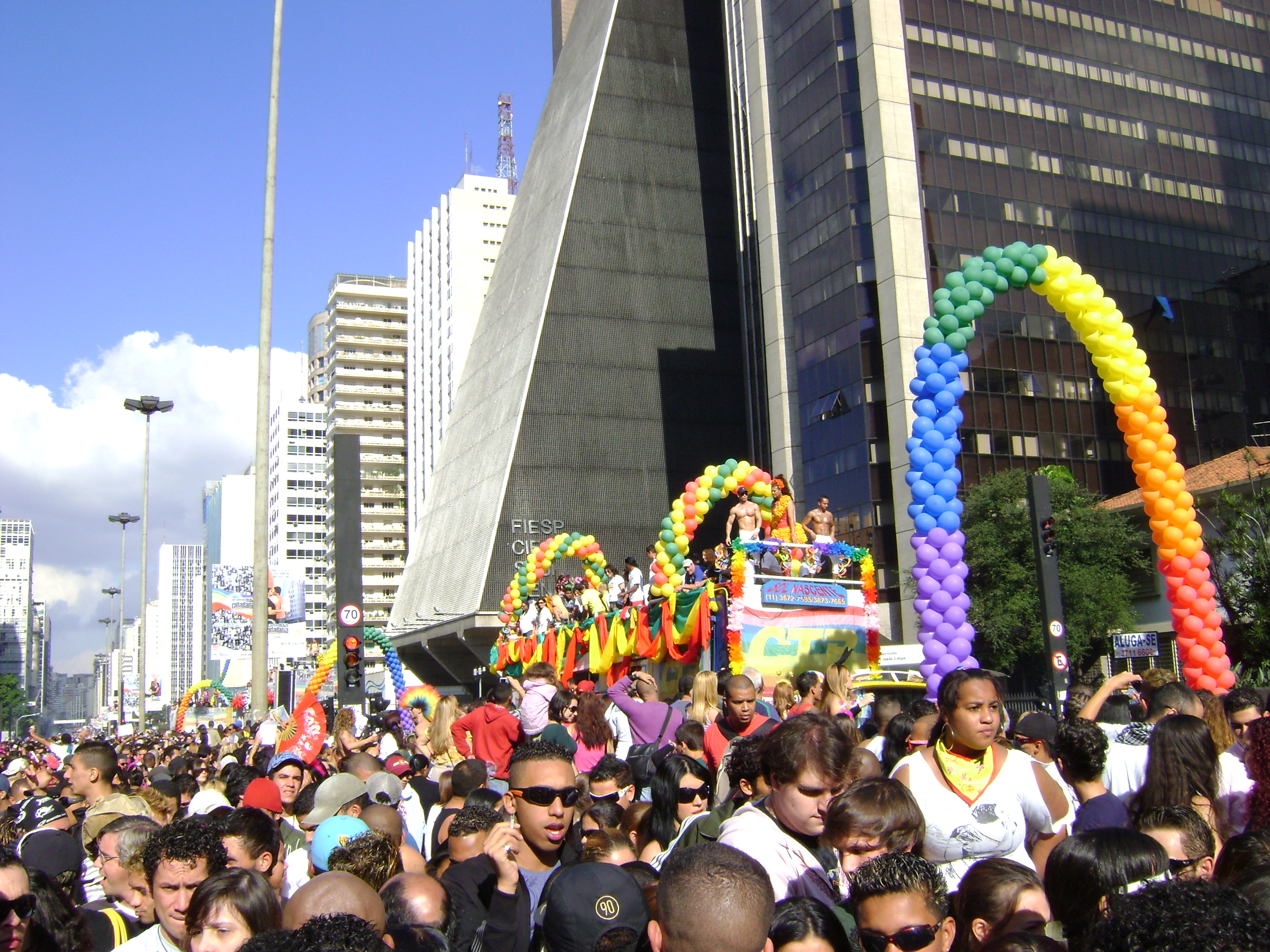
Paulista Avenue in Gay Pride 2009

- 1997 – "We are many, we are in every occupation"
- 1998 – "The rights of gays, lesbians and travestis are human rights"
- 1999 – "Gay pride in Brazil, on the way of the year 2000"
- 2000 – "Celebrating the pride of living diversity"
- 2001 – "Embracing diversity"
- 2002 – "Educating for diversity"
- 2003 – "Building homosexual policies"
- 2004 – "We have family and pride"
- 2005 – "Civil partnership now. Equal rights! Neither more nor less"
- 2006 – "Homophobia is a crime! Sexual rights are human rights"
- 2007 – "For a world without racism, macho sexism and homophobia"
- 2008 – "Homophobia kills! For a secular state de facto"
- 2009 – "No homophobia, more citizenship – For the isonomy of rights!"
- 2010 – "Vote against homophobia, defend citizenship" (*2010 is election year in Brazil)
- 2011 – "Love one Another. Enough with homophobia"
- 2012 – "Homophobia has a cure: Education and criminalization"
- 2013 – "Back to the closet, never again! Union and awareness in the fight against homophobia"
- 2014 – "A successful country is a country without homophobia. No more deaths! Criminalization now! "
- 2015 – "I was born like this, I grew up like this, I will always be like this: respect me!"
- 2016 – "Gender identity law, now! - All people together against transphobia!"
- 2017 – "Regardless of our beliefs, no religion is law! Together for a secular state!"
- 2018 – "Power to LGBTI+. Our Vote, Our Voice."
- 2019 – "50 Years of Stonewall - Our Achievements, Our Pride to be LGBT+."
- 2022 – "Vote With Pride."
- 2023 – "Social politics for LGBT+ - we want the whole and not the half"
- 2024 – "Enough of Negligence and Setbacks in the Legislature: Vote Consciously for LGBT+ Rights"
- 2025 – "Aging LGBT+: Memory, Resistance and Future"
- 2026 – "The street calls, the ballot confirms"

== See also ==
- List of LGBT events
- LGBT rights in Brazil
- Gay pride
- Gay pride parade
- Beyond Carnival by James N. Green
