= List of LGBTQ politicians in Brazil =

This is a list of lesbian, gay, bisexual, transgender and queer (LGBTQ) Brazilians who were elected as governors, deputies, or councillors, or nominated as ministers or secretaries of state.

== Ministers ==
Photo	Minister	Party	State	Term	Notes
	Gilberto Gil	PV	BA	2003–2008	Came out in 2023
	Marcelo Calero	PSD	RJ	2016	First openly-gay minister of the cabinet
	Ana Moser	PT	RN	2023	First openly-lesbian minister of the cabinet
	Anielle Franco	PT	RJ	2023–2026	First openly-bisexual minister of the cabinet

== Secretaries of state ==
Photo	Secretary	Party	State	Term	Notes
	Eleonora Menicucci	PT	MG	2012–2015	Bisexual
	Symmy Larrat	PT	PA	2023–present	Transgender

== Governors ==
Photo	Governor	Party	State	Term	Notes
	Eduardo Leite	PSDB	RS	2019–2022 2023–present	First openly-gay governor of Brazil
	Fátima Bezerra	PT	RN	2019–present	First openly-lesbian governor of Brazil

== Senators ==
Photo	Senator	Party	State	Term	Notes
	Fabiano Contarato	PT	ES	2019–present	First openly-gay senator of Brazil

== Federal deputies ==
Photo	Federal Deputies	Party	State	Term	Notes
	Clodovil Hernandes	PL	SP	2007–2009	Gay
	Jean Wyllys	PSOL	RJ	2011–2018	Gay
	David Miranda	PSOL	RJ	2019–2022	Gay
	Israel Batista	PSB	DF	2019–2022	Gay
	Marcelo Calero	PSD	RJ	2019–2022	Gay
	Rafafá	PSDB	PB	2021	Gay
	Vivi Reis	PSOL	PA	2021–2022	Bisexual
	Erika Hilton	PSOL	SP	2023–present	Transgender
	Duda Salabert	PDT	MG	2023–present	Transgender
	Dandara Tonantzin	PT	SP	2023–present	Bisexual
	Daiana Santos	PCdoB	RS	2023–present	Lesbian
	Clodoaldo Magalhães	PV	PE	2023–present	Gay

== State deputies ==
Photo	Federal Deputies	Party	State	Term	Notes
	Eulina Rabelo	PROS	PA	2003–2006	Bisexual
	Leci Brandão	PCdoB	SP	2011–present	Lesbian
	Fabiola Mansur	PSB	BA	2015–2022	Lesbian
	Douglas Garcia	Republicans	SP	2019–2022	Gay
	Erica Malunguinho	PSOL	SP	2019–2022	Transgender
	Isa Penna	PCdoB	SP	2019–2022	Bisexual
	Fábio Felix	PSOL	DF	2019–present	Gay
	Dani Monteiro	PSOL	RJ	2019–present	Bisexual
	Guilherme Cortez	PSOL	SP	2023–present	Bisexual
	Thainara Faria	PT	SP	2023–present	Bisexual
	Ediane Maria	PSOL	SP	2023–present	Bisexual
	Linda Brasil	PSOL	SE	2023–present	Transgender
	Dani Balbi	PCdoB	RJ	2023–present	Transgender
	Verônica Lima	PT	RJ	2023–present	Lesbian
	Bella Gonçalves	PSOL	MG	2023–present	Lesbian
	Rosa Amorim	PT	PE	2023–present	Lesbian
	Michelle Melo	UNIÃO	AC	2023–present	Bisexual
	Keit Lima	PSOL	SP	2027–present	Bisexual

== Mayors ==
Photo	Mayors	Party	City	State	Term	Notes
	Astrid Maria Cunha e Silva	PFL	Viseu	PA	1996–2004	Bisexual
	Jorge Allen	PSD	Poá	SP	1997–1998	Gay
	Edgar de Souza	PSDB	Lins	SP	2013–2020	Gay
	Wirley Rodrigues Reis	PHS	Itapecerica	MG	2021–2024	Gay
	Paulo Alves	União Brasil	Mariluz	PR	2021–present	Gay
	Diego Singolani	PSD	Santa Cruz do Rio Pardo	SP	2021–present	Gay

== Municipal councilors ==
Photo	Councilors	Party	City	State	Term	Notes
	Renildo José dos Santos	PTR	Coqueiro Seco	AL	1993	Bisexual
	Kátia Tapety	Progressistas	Colônia do Piauí	PI	1993–2004	Transgender; later first transgender vice-mayor (2004)
	Léo Kret	DEM	Salvador	BA	2009–2013	Transgender
	Paulo Diógenes	PSD	Fortaleza	CE	2013–2016	
	Brenda Santunioni	Progressistas	Viçosa	MG	2017–2020	
	Fernando Holiday	NOVO	São Paulo	SP	2017–present	Gay
	Marielle Franco	PSOL	Rio de Janeiro	RJ	2017–2018	Bisexual
	Duda Salabert	PDT	Belo Horizonte	MG	2021–2023	Transgender and lesbian
	Erika Hilton	PSOL	São Paulo	SP	2021–2023	Transgender
	Mônica Benício	PSOL	Rio de Janeiro	RJ	2021–present	
	Thammy Miranda	PL	São Paulo	SP	2021–present	Transgender
	Carla Ayres	PT	Florianópolis	SC	2021–present	
	Valdir Gomes	PSD	Campo Grande	MS	2021–present	
	Thabatta Pimenta	PROS	Natal	RN	2025–present	Transgender
	Linda Brasil	PSOL	Aracaju	SE	2021–2023	Transgender
	Bruno Cunha	Cidadania	Blumenau	SC	2021–present	
	Jana Guedes	PDT	Videira	SC	2021–present	
	Fabiane Peglow	PSB	São Lourenço do Sul	RS	2021–present	
	Amanda Gondim	PDT	Uberlândia	MG	2021–present	
	Benny Briolly	PSOL	Niterói	RJ	2021–present	
	Regininha	Avante	Araçatuba	SP	2021–present	
	Márcio Araújo	PSD	Mauá	SP	2021–present	
	Walkíria Nictheroy	PCdoB	Niterói	RJ	2021–present	Bisexual
	Willian Carvalho	DEM	Quatis	RJ	2021–present	Gay
	Giorgia Prates	PT	Curitiba	PR	2023–present	Lesbian
	Giovani Culau	PCdoB	Porto Alegre	RS	2023–present	Gay
