= LGBTQ people in Brazil =

Brazilian pride flag

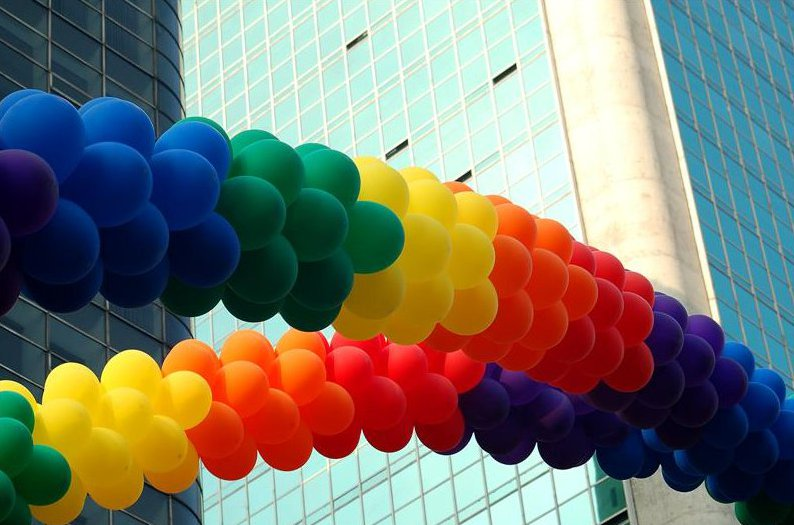
Rainbow balloons in São Paulo.

LGBTQ people in Brazil represent an estimated 5.2% of the Brazilian population.

In Brazil, civil unions between same-sex couples were legalized in 2011, and marriage, in 2013. Adoption is also already a right guaranteed to LGBTQ people.

== History ==
=== Pre-Cabraline era ===
There is considerable evidence that homosexuality was socially accepted among Indigenous peoples. According to the researcher Abelardo Romero, homosexuality "had spread for centuries among the native Brazilians as if it were a contagious disease". Von Martius also reported the astonishment of the Portuguese at the anthropophagy and sodomy practiced by Indigenous peoples, as did the priest Manuel da Nóbrega, who in 1549 remarked that many settlers kept Indigenous men as wives "according to the custom of the land".

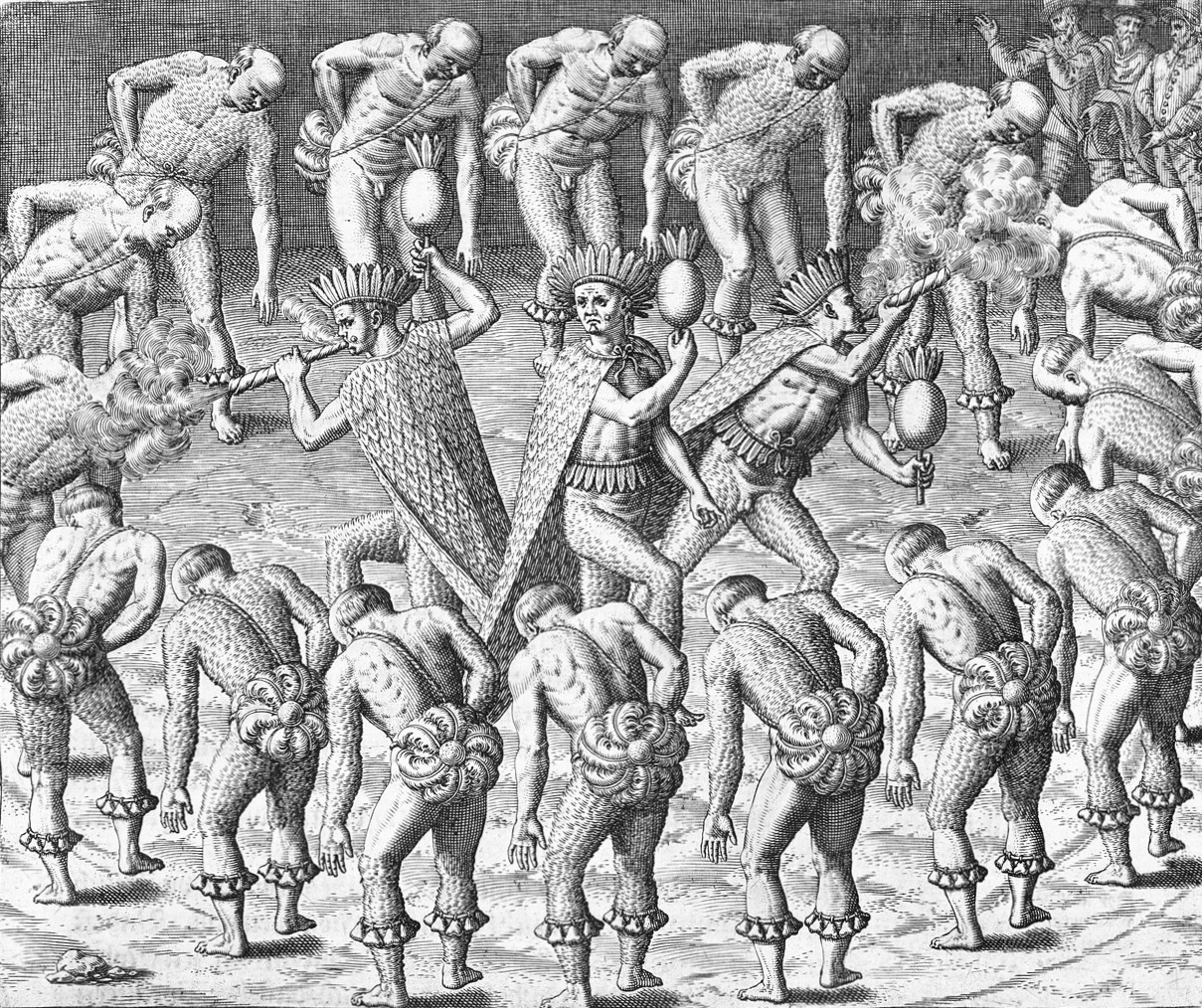
Religious ceremony of Tupinambá people in an engraving by Theodor de Bry

Among the Tupinambá, the Tratado Descritivo do Brasil (1587), written by Gabriel Soares de Souza, refers to both male and female homosexuality. It describes that the "sin against nature" was well accepted, and that the person taking the active role was considered brave, recounting the act as an achievement. There were also individuals who maintained public tents for those who wanted them as public women, indicating possible male prostitution.

The Tupinaés, neighbors of the Tupinambá, were "much more subject to the sin against nature than the Tupinambá". In 1576 the Portuguese writer Pero de Magalhães de Gândavo also reported that the Indigenous people "give themselves to the vice (of sodomy) as if they had no reason of men". Among the Guaicurú, there are also accounts of transvestism, such as the cudinas, castrated men who dressed as women and carried out exclusively female tasks such as weaving. In the Bororo tribe, young men gathered in the baito (or men's house), where women could not enter and where youths engaged in sexual relations quite naturally. In Indigenous medicine itself, treatment was sometimes carried out through sexual relations between the shaman and the sick, including anal intercourse, as among the Coeruna. Among shamans, healing knowledge was transmitted from the elder shaman to his apprentices through sexual intercourse, in which the student submitted to the elder.

=== Colonial period ===
With the arrival of the Portuguese, the Portuguese legal codes began to apply in Brazilian territory, classifying sodomy as the "most vile, filthy and dishonest sin".

== LGBTQ rights ==
=== Recognition of same-sex unions as a family entity ===
On 5 May 2011, the Supreme Federal Court unanimously recognized the existence of a family entity known as a same-sex union between homosexual couples. As a result, the rights granted to same-sex couples became similar in some respects to those of a stable union, including pensions, retirement benefits and inclusion in health insurance plans. The full effects of this decision were not immediately clear at the time, as it was still uncertain whether same-sex couples would be able to marry. In her vote, Justice Ellen Gracie Northfleet stated that "a decent society is a society that does not humiliate its members", while Justice Luiz Fux said that "homosexuality characterizes the humanity of a person. It is not a crime. So why cannot a homosexual constitute a family? Because of two issues that are abhorred by our Constitution: intolerance and prejudice".

=== Civil movements and activity in institutional politics ===
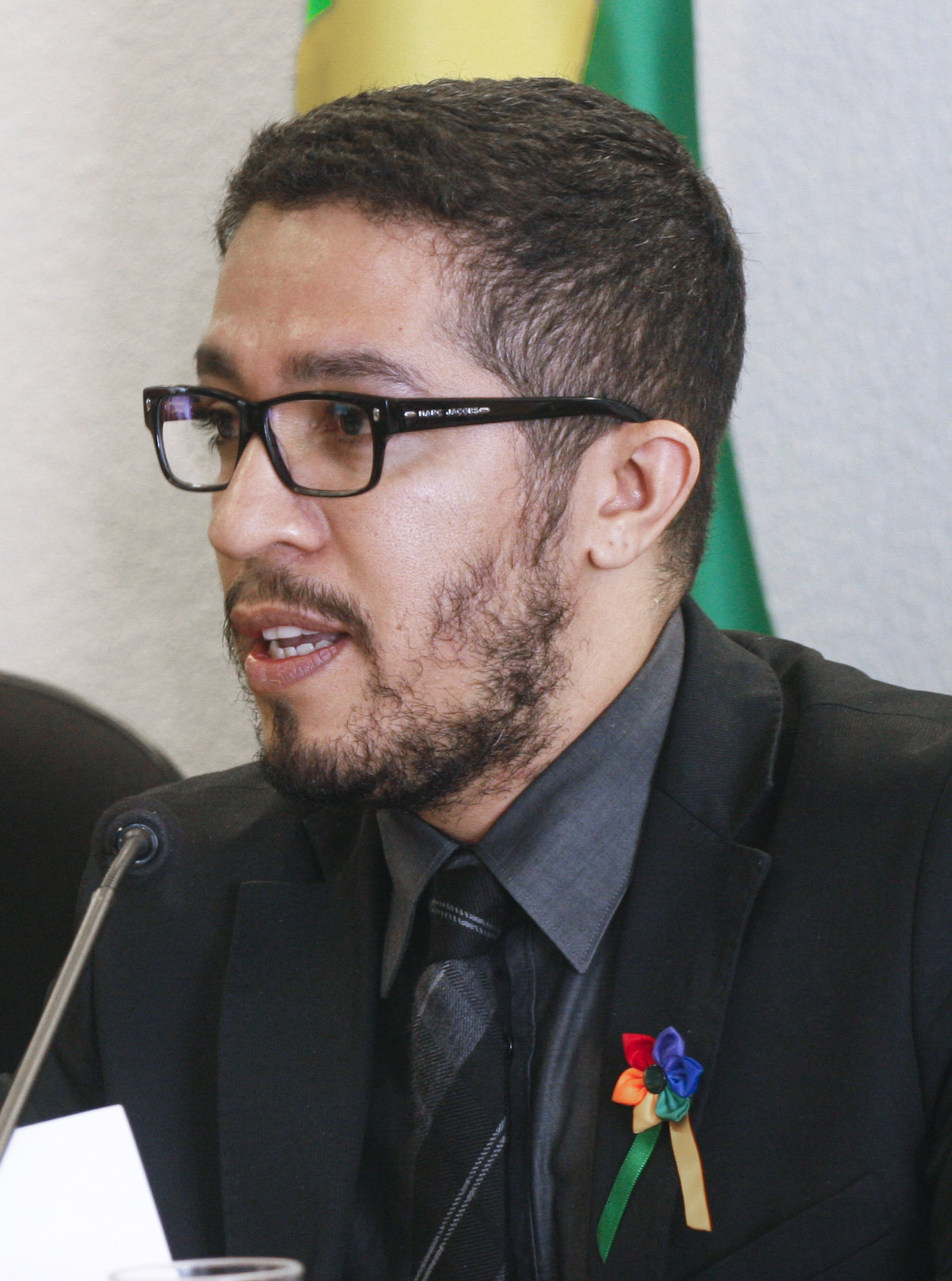
Jean Wyllys, one of the defenders of the LGBTQ community in the Brazilian Congress in recent years.

Among the first organized groups was Somos, from São Paulo, considered the first homosexual association with primarily political goals, founded in 1978. It was dissolved in 1983. At the beginning of the 1980s there were about 22 such groups across the country, especially in the Rio–São Paulo axis.

In politics, the defense of LGBTQ rights has been carried out predominantly by politicians sympathetic to the movement, as openly homosexual elected representatives have historically been rare. Among them was Clodovil Hernandes (died in 2009), the first openly homosexual person elected as a federal deputy, although he adopted a strongly critical stance toward the LGBTQ rights movement and did not consider himself elected by the LGBTQ population. Also notable is José Cláudio de Araújo, mayor of Paraty from 2001 to 2004, referred to as the first openly gay mayor in the country. Jean Wyllys, a federal deputy elected in 2010 who is openly homosexual, has been one of the most prominent defenders of the LGBTQ community in the Brazilian Congress.

Given the small number of openly LGBTQ candidates, the number of elected officials has also been very limited. In the 2008 municipal elections, those elected as city councillors included the travesti Leo Kret (Salvador), Moacyr Sélia, better known as Moa (Nova Venécia, Espírito Santo), and Isaías Martins de Oliveira (Patos de Minas, Minas Gerais), as well as the openly gay politicians José Itaparandi (Paço do Lumiar, Maranhão), and Sander Simaglio (Alfenas, Minas Gerais). Also cited are Vilson José Porcíncula, councillor in Tijucas, Santa Catarina, and Anselmo Fabiano Santos, councillor in Itaúna, Minas Gerais (the ABGLT lists Anselmo as an ally rather than gay). The vice-mayor of João Alfredo, Pernambuco, Dimas Prazeres dos Santos, is also openly homosexual, despite serving as deputy to Severino Cavalcanti, known for his homophobic positions. Another notable figure is Kátia Tapety, the first transgender person to hold political office in Brazil (city councillor in 1992 and vice-mayor in 2004) in Colônia do Piauí, Piauí.

Although LGBTQ rights were not part of her political platform, Pará state deputy Eulina Rabelo gained national attention after being considered ineligible to run for mayor of Viseu in 2004 because she maintained a same-sex relationship, widely known in the city, with the incumbent mayor Astrid Cunha (mayor of Viseu from 1996 to 2004). Another politician whose sexual orientation was revealed involuntarily was the former mayor of Poá, Jorge Allen.

Milestone in electoral politics	Person	Election date	Office
First bisexual councillor elected	Renildo José dos Santos	1992	Councillor of Coqueiro Seco
First transgender person elected	Kátia Tapety	1992	Councillor of Colônia do Piauí
First transgender vice-mayor	Kátia Tapety	2004	Vice-mayor of Colônia do Piauí
First openly homosexual federal deputy	Clodovil Hernandes	2006	Federal deputy for São Paulo
First transgender councillor in a state capital	Leo Kret	2008	Councillor of Salvador
First LGBTQ activist parliamentarian	Jean Wyllys	2010	Federal deputy for Rio de Janeiro
First openly homosexual mayor elected	Edgar de Souza	2012	Mayor of Lins
First openly homosexual senator elected	Fabiano Contarato	2018	Senator for Espírito Santo
First openly homosexual governors (Note: Eduardo Leite was not openly homosexual at the time of his election in 2018. He publicly came out only in July 2021 in an interview on the television program Conversa com Bial.)	Eduardo Leite and Fátima Bezerra	2018 (RS, RN)	Governors of Rio Grande do Sul and Rio Grande do Norte, respectively
First transgender federal deputies	Erika Hilton and Duda Salabert	2022 (SP, MG)	Federal deputies for São Paulo and Minas Gerais, respectively

== Demographics ==
=== Demographic research ===
The sex composition of the LGBTQ population is distributed as follows: 64% male and 36% female. The composition of declared sexual orientation of the study population is distributed as follows: 5.76% identifies as asexual, 0.93% said they were lesbian, 1.37% gay, 2.12% bisexual, 0.68 trans, and 1.18% non-binary. The education of the LGBTQ population is distributed as follows: 57% have higher degree (university or college) complete, 40% have high school (school) complete. The composition of housing condition of the LGBTQ population is distributed as follows: 52% live with parents or relatives, 22% live with partners, 20% live alone, 6% live with friends.

In 2010, a survey conducted by Ministry of Health of Brazil revealed that the Brazilian gay population has more money than heterosexual population. The homosexuals were: A and B classes, 26.9%, C class, 49.9%, D and E classes, 23.2%. The heterosexuals were: A and B classes, 18.2%, C class, 47.8%, D and E classes 34%.

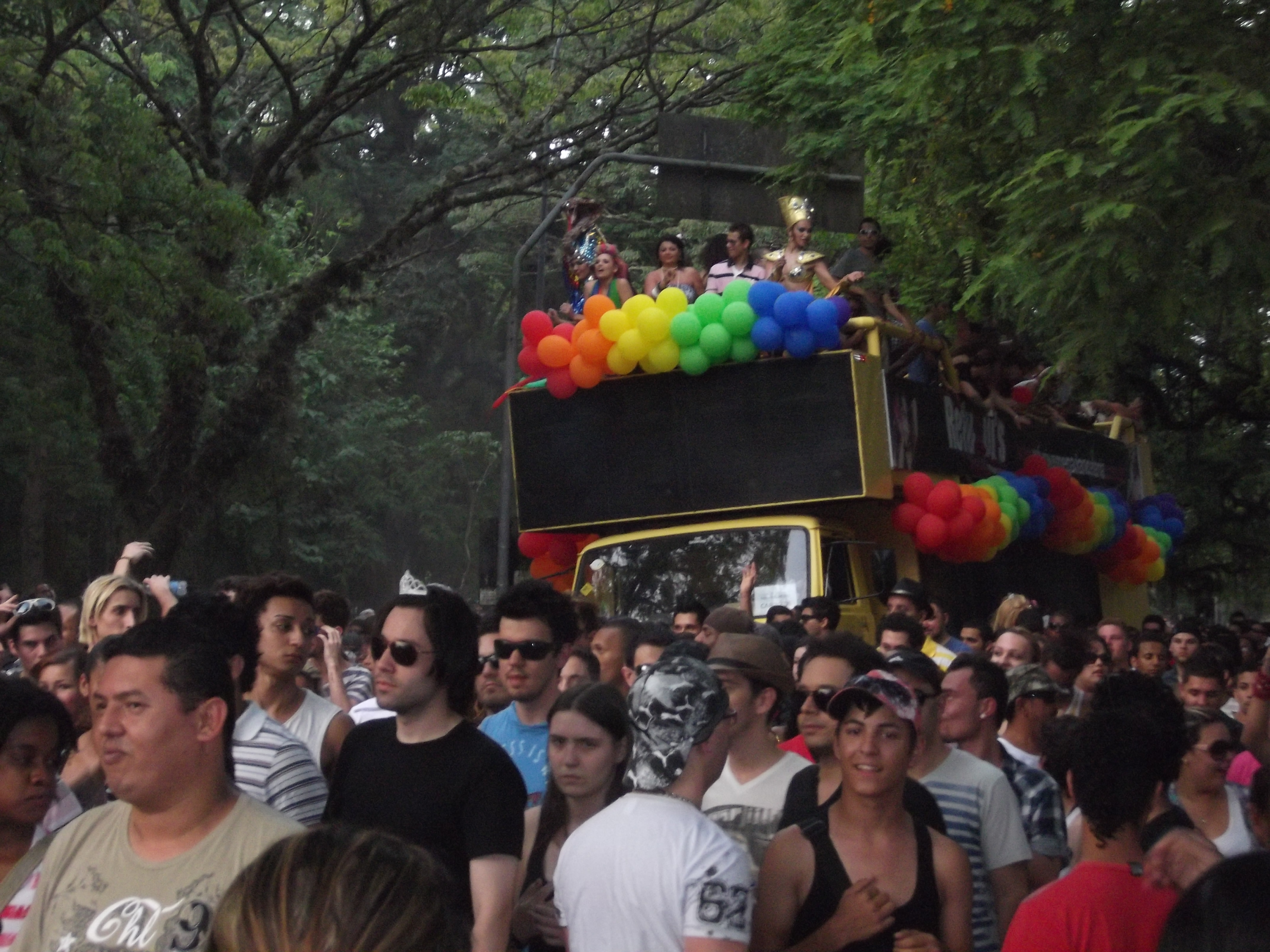
LGBTs in Porto Alegre.

In 2007, a survey conducted by Insearch revealed that gays of Brazil spend 40% more on items related to leisure than heterosexuals. 84% traveled to Brazil four times over the past 12 months and 36% went abroad in the last three years. The Brazilian gays also read more, 88% read newspapers, and 94% read magazines. 73% have a habit of go to the movies three times a month on average, 46% go to the theater once a month and 57% buy eight books a year. Surpassing the national average.

Approximately 80% of Brazilian LGBTQ people reside in large cities, 20% came from interior. The large cities of Brazil, known as gay-friendly, often contain a number of gay-oriented establishments, such as gay bars and pubs, gay nightclubs, gay bathhouses and gay restaurants. The most famous gay village of São Paulo is the Frei Caneca Street and in Rio is the Farme de Amoedo Street.

Pride Celebrations

In São Paulo there is an annual Gay Pride Parade recording three to five million in attendance since 2019. People all over world travel to attend this event, it broke guinesse world records in 1997 and 2006 for holding the biggest pride parade in the world at 2.5 million people (for that point in time). The gay pride Parade in Brazil also draws more than 400,000 visitors and generates more than $100 million in economic activity.

LGBTQ Legislature

There have been great movements forward in policymaking regarding the protection and support of the LGBTQ+ community in Brazil, as noted in LGBTQ rights in Brazil. Equaldex has recorded the policies and rights created in Acre, Brazil, in support of the LGBTQ+ community. This consists of non-binary gender federal recognition, the ban on conversion therapy, removal of restrictions for gender changing surgeries, hate crime protections, legality in the military, and more.

=== Same-sex couples ===
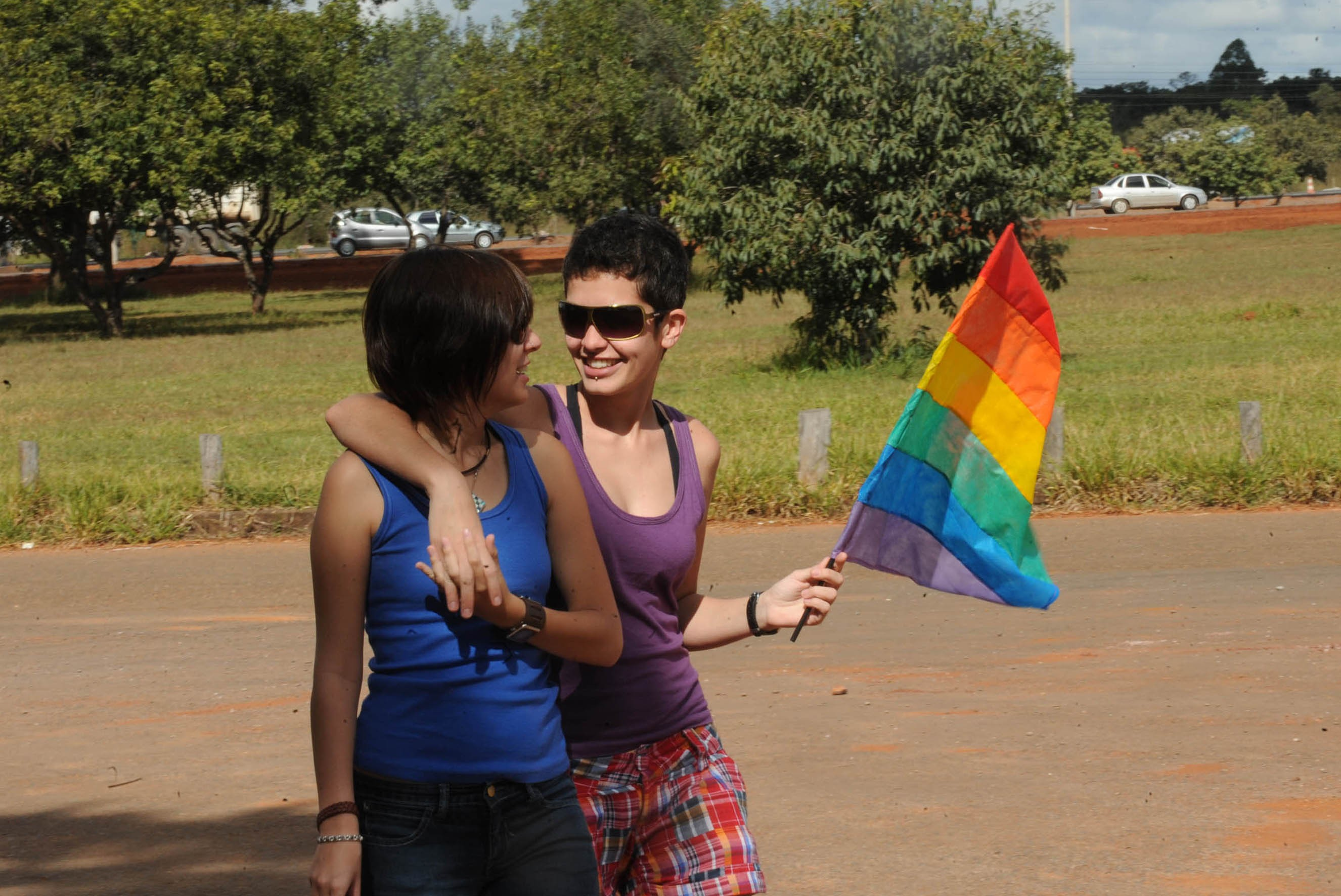
Lesbian couple in Brasília.

Same-sex relationships in the same home by Brazilian regions, according to the 2010 IBGE Census:

Rank	Region	Same-sex Couples	Same-sex Couples
Rank	Region	Same-sex Couples	rank
1	Southeast	32,202	1
2	Northeast	12,196	2
3	South	8,000	3
4	Central-West	4,141	4
5	North	3,429	5

=== GDP per capita ===
Same-sex couples had more GDP per capita (annual) than Opposite-sex couples, according to the 2010 IBGE Census:

GDP per capita (annual)	Opposite-sex Couples	Same-sex Couples
< R$3,270 (miserable)	9.2%	3.4%
R$3,270 < R$6,540 (poor)	18.72%	15.6%
R$6,540 < R$13,080 (relatively poor)	10.56%	25.14%
R$13,080 < R$32,700 (lower middle class)	10.56%	20.5%
R$32,700 < R$65,400 (middle class)	3.41%	9.55%
R$65,400 < R$130,800 (upper middle class)	1.05%	3.77%
> R$130,800 (rich)	0.34%	1.4%

== Homophobia and transphobia ==
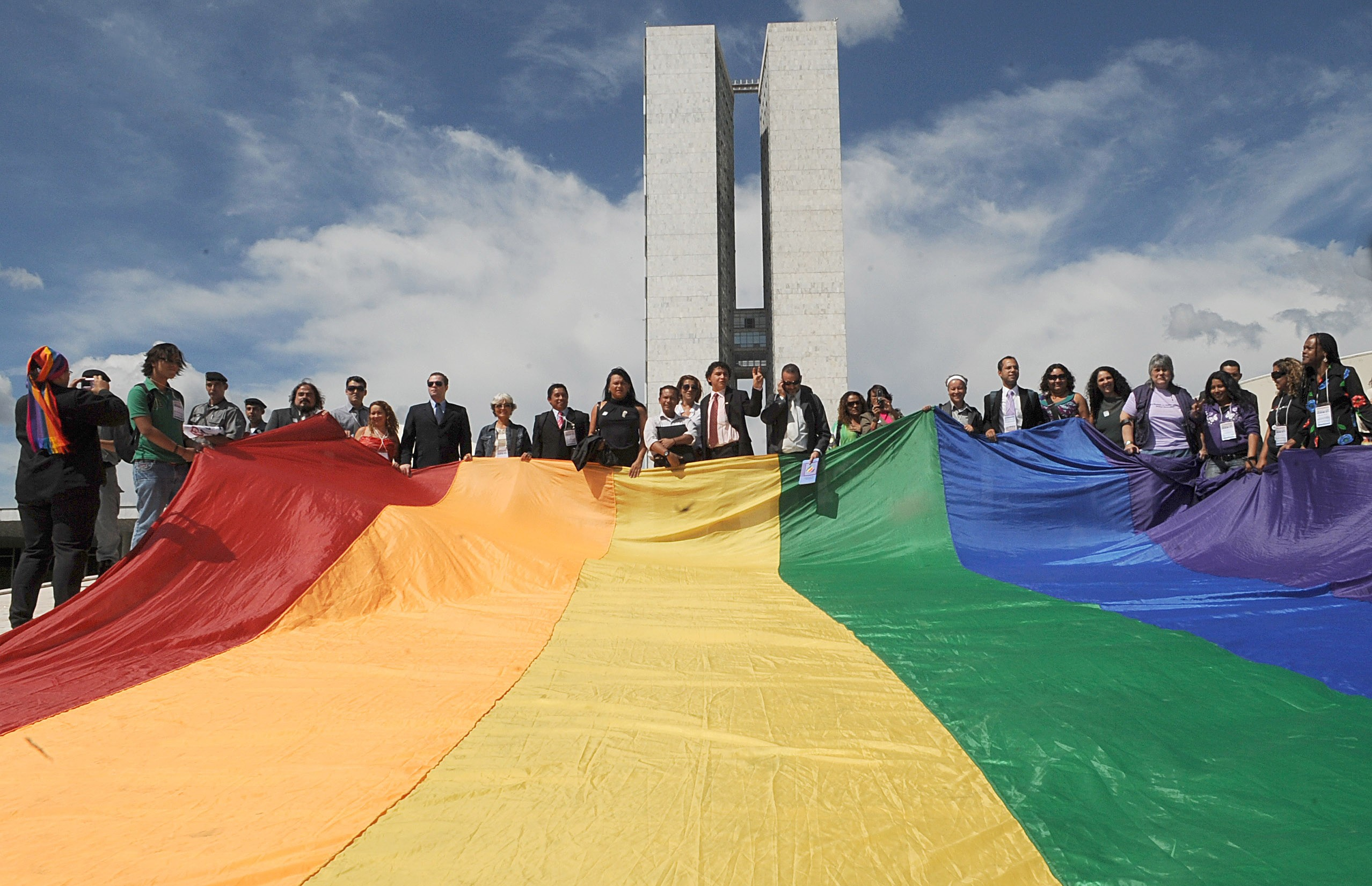
Protest in favor of LGBTQ rights in front of the National Congress of Brazil.

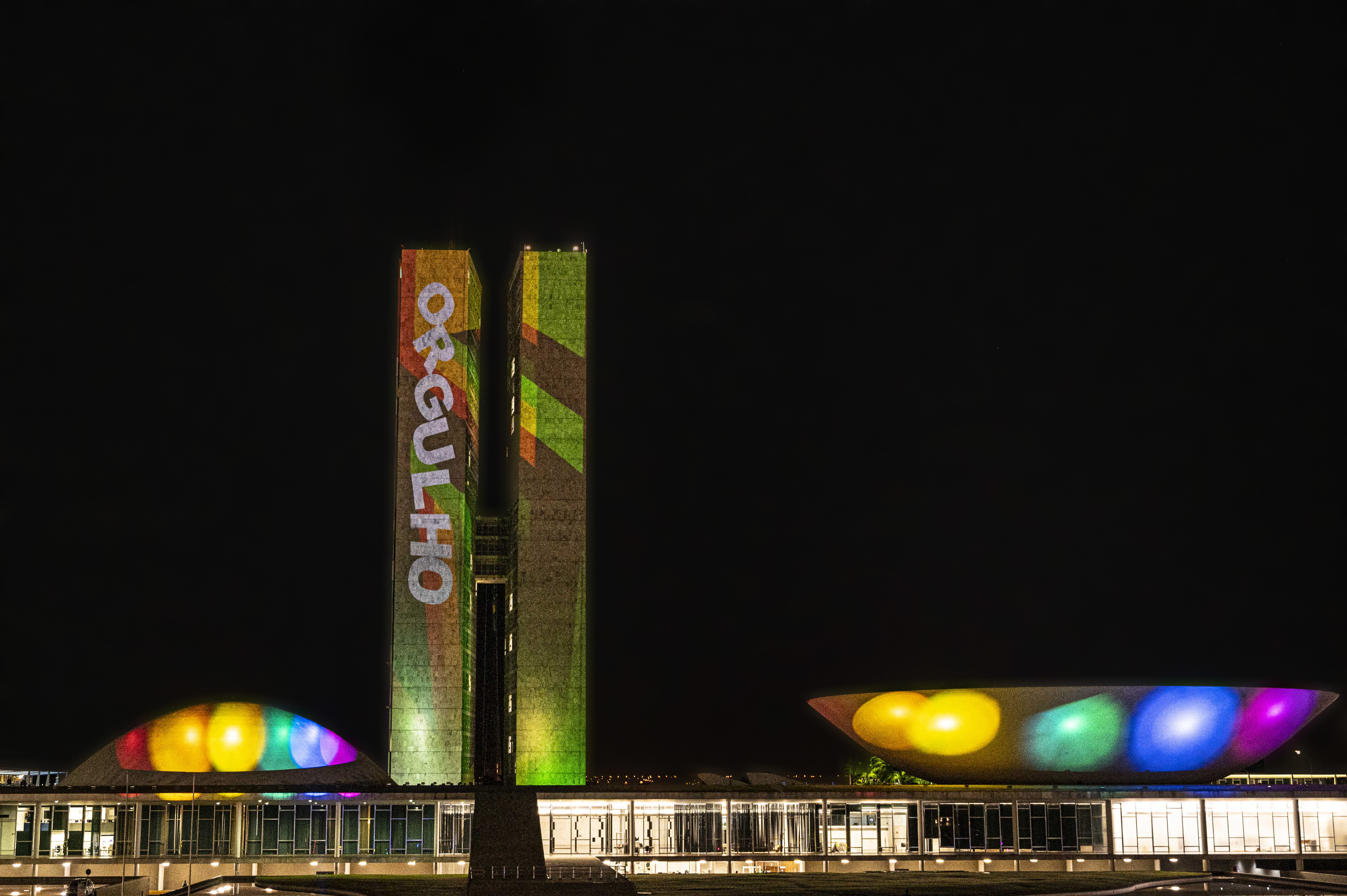
The National Congress building illuminated in honor of the International LGBTQ Pride Day

Homophobia in Brazil remains an ongoing and persistent problem, with statistics compiled by the Grupo Gay da Bahia, on the basis of which the group argues that Brazil is the most homophobic country in the world.

In April 2009, the Grupo Gay da Bahia released its survey of cases verified in 2008, reporting that 190 people were murdered in Brazil that year, of whom 64% were gay men, 32% were travestis, and 4% were lesbians, an increase of 55% over the 2007 figures, keeping the country as the one recording the highest number of crimes of a homophobic nature. The survey also concluded that the risk of a travesti being murdered was 259 times higher than that of a gay man, with Pernambuco as the most violent state. Since it began the research in 1980, the group had recorded 2,998 murders. In 2010, young homosexuals were attacked on Avenida Paulista in São Paulo.

== Visibility and cultural references ==
From the 1980s onward, with the advance of AIDS, a disease initially identified almost exclusively with the LGBTQ population (often referred to as the "gay plague"), homosexuality gained visibility. The major annual event related to homosexuality in Brazil is the São Paulo Gay Pride Parade, which in recent years has brought together more than 3 million people and is considered the largest in the world. The event is listed in the Guinness Book based on figures released by the Military Police for the 2006 edition: 2.5 million people (from 2007 onward, the publication did not consider newer figures because no estimate was released by an official source).

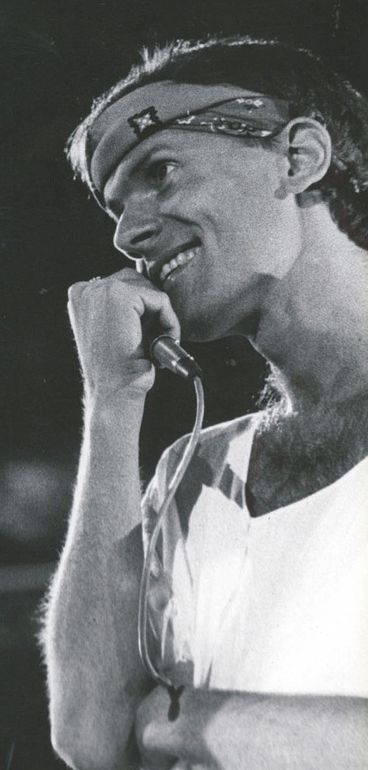

Reference to homosexual practices by major national heroes meets strong resistance from historians. A list prepared by historian Luiz Mott containing the 100 greatest Brazilian personalities with homosexual behavior, among whom were Tiradentes, Mário de Andrade, Olavo Bilac, Roberto Burle Marx, Dom João VI, Santos Dumont and Zumbi dos Palmares, generated protest and controversy. In the cultural sphere, however, the issue is less controversial, and many artists openly reveal their homosexuality or bisexuality without that affecting recognition of their work, including Cazuza, Cássia Eller, Ney Matogrosso, Renato Russo, Gilberto Braga, Aguinaldo Silva, and the drag queen Pabllo Vittar. In the artistic world, not all openly LGBTQ personalities are well regarded by the homosexual movement, as in the case of the late actor Jorge Lafond, whose career was marked by his portrayal of Vera Verão, considered a negative caricature for representing an effeminate gay man who was overbearing and aggressive toward women.

In Brazilian cinema, according to a survey by film professor Antonio Moreno of films released between 1923 and 1996, the homosexual character is portrayed as politically alienated, aggressive in behavior, frequently with exaggeratedly feminine gestures, incapable of a monogamous relationship, tending toward solitude, and resorting to paid partners. Rarely a protagonist, such characters contributed to reinforcing the negative stereotype of the Brazilian homosexual. Amores Possíveis, released in 2000, already showed a notable advance in the treatment of the subject. In 2009, a Brazilian film with a homosexual theme called Do Começo ao Fim was released, attracting more than 10,000 viewers on its opening weekend. Showing on only nine screens (as against more than 600 for Lua Nova and 550 for 2012), the film showed staying power by debuting in sixth place nationally.

=== On television ===
==== The first homosexual kiss ====
In 1963 actresses Vida Alves and Geórgia Gomide performed the first homosexual kiss on Brazilian television on Rede Tupi in one of the episodes of TV de Vanguarda, entitled Calúnia. In the story, Vida and Geórgia played the directors of a boarding school for girls who were slandered by a rebellious student who said the two were lovers, leading parents to withdraw their daughters from the school, which then closed. Bankrupt, the two ended up discovering that they really loved each other and kissed at the end of the story. The productions were broadcast live, since videotape did not yet exist for recording at the time, and only a photographer recorded behind-the-scenes images, although this photograph was lost when the station closed years later. In 2011, Vida, who had also performed the first heterosexual kiss on Brazilian television, said in an interview with Época that there had been no discrimination from the public: "The scene was talked about, but I did not feel any aggressive sentiment from people toward me. I am sure they judged me, but they did not attack me". Only on 24 May 2016, during the program Okay Pessoal!!!, did Vida reveal that she had found a photograph of the occasion, showing it for the first time 53 years after the event.

==== Impactful characters in telenovelas ====
In 1968, the work As Professorinhas, on RecordTV, featured for the first time a homosexual protagonist in a telenovela, Helena, played by Tamara Restier, one of the five central characters in the plot, who lived with another woman, although the relationship was only mentioned, since the private lives of neither of them were shown, only their professional lives. From the 1980s onward, homosexual characters began to be included frequently in telenovelas, although still in minor and stereotyped roles, including effeminate gestures and voice for men and short hair and masculinized behavior for women. The first homosexual character in the 20 years after the first homosexual kiss was Inácio, in Brilhante, a telenovela by Gilberto Braga, in 1981, played by Dênis Carvalho. In 1990 Rede Manchete moved ahead of the other broadcasters and showed for the first time a kiss between two men in the miniseries Mãe de Santo, between the characters Rafael (Daniel Barcellos) and Matheus (Raí Alves). In 1998 Sílvio de Abreu proposed a more humanized approach on Rede Globo by including in Torre de Babel a lesbian couple, played by Leila (Sílvia Pfeifer) and Neuza (Christiane Torloni), for the first time in a non-caricatured manner. The couple, however, had a high rejection rate from the public and the author had to kill them in the collapse of the shopping mall where the plot centered.

In 2003, the couple formed by Clara (Alinne Moraes) and Rafaela (Paula Picarelli) in Mulheres Apaixonadas was the first accepted by the public in the modern history of Brazilian television. Author Manoel Carlos used as a counterpoint the homophobic character Paulinha (Roberta Gualda), who practiced prejudice, causing the public to root for the couple. In 2004 Aguinaldo Silva decided to explore further a relationship between two women, including the characters Jenifer (Bárbara Borges) and Eleonora (Mylla Christie) in Senhora do Destino and showing small kisses between them, without major press attention. The scene in which the two appeared naked in bed after sexual relations was well received by the public and brought the telenovela to 48 audience points. For the first time, a same-sex couple was shown adopting a child. After the good reception of female couples, Glória Perez decided to construct the same discussion with a male homosexual character in América, in 2005, creating a story around Junior (Bruno Gagliasso), a young man struggling with whether or not to tell his mother about his sexuality, while also carrying on a romance with Zeca (Erom Cordeiro). The couple even filmed a kissing scene, but management at Rede Globo vetoed its broadcast. In 2009 the telenovela Bela, a Feia, on RecordTV, also approached homosexual relations in a more humanized way, making as a central plot the discovery of Diego's (Daniel Erthal) sexuality and his romance with Diogo (Sérgio Menezes), making them one of the principal couples in the story.

After these interactions there was a regression in the humanization and treatment of homosexuals in telenovelas, returning to stereotyped characters with catchphrases, scandalous mannerisms, and no developed romantic or family relationships, usually serving only as friends of wealthy women, including Cássio (Marco Pigossi) in Caras & Bocas (2009), Áureo (André Gonçalves) in Morde & Assopra (2011), and Crô (Marcelo Serrado) in Fina Estampa (2011). The Grupo Gay da Bahia (GGB) even declared that these characters were "enemies" for creating in the public mind a negative caricature that every LGBTQ person would be effeminate. In 2011 the SBT aired in Amor e Revolução the network's first homosexual kiss, between the characters Marina (Giselle Tigre) and Marcela (Luciana Vendramini). In 2014, the first kiss was finally shown on Rede Globo, between the characters Félix (Mateus Solano) and Niko (Thiago Fragoso), making it one of the last broadcasters to allow such a depiction.

== See also ==
- LGBTQ rights in the Americas
- LGBTQ rights in Brazil
- LGBTQ people
- Gay village
- São Paulo Gay Pride Parade
- Beyond Carnival by James N. Green

== Bibliography ==
- Trevisan, João Silvério (2007). Devassos no paraíso: a homossexualidade no Brasil, da colônia à atualidade [Debauchees in paradise: homosexuality in Brazil, from the colony to the present] (7 ed.). Rio de Janeiro: Objetiva.
