= Quarto Centenário =

Municipality in Parana, Brazil

Coordinates: 24°16′44″S 53°04′33″W

- Municipality
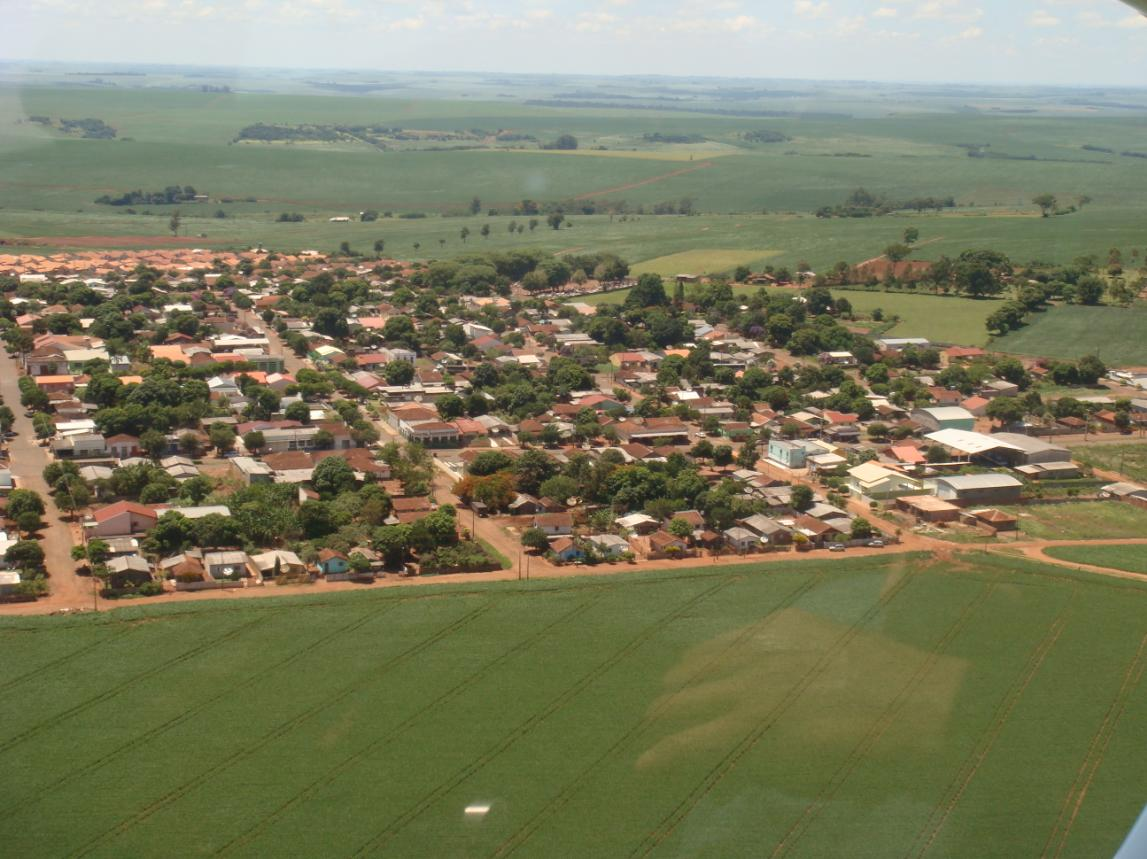

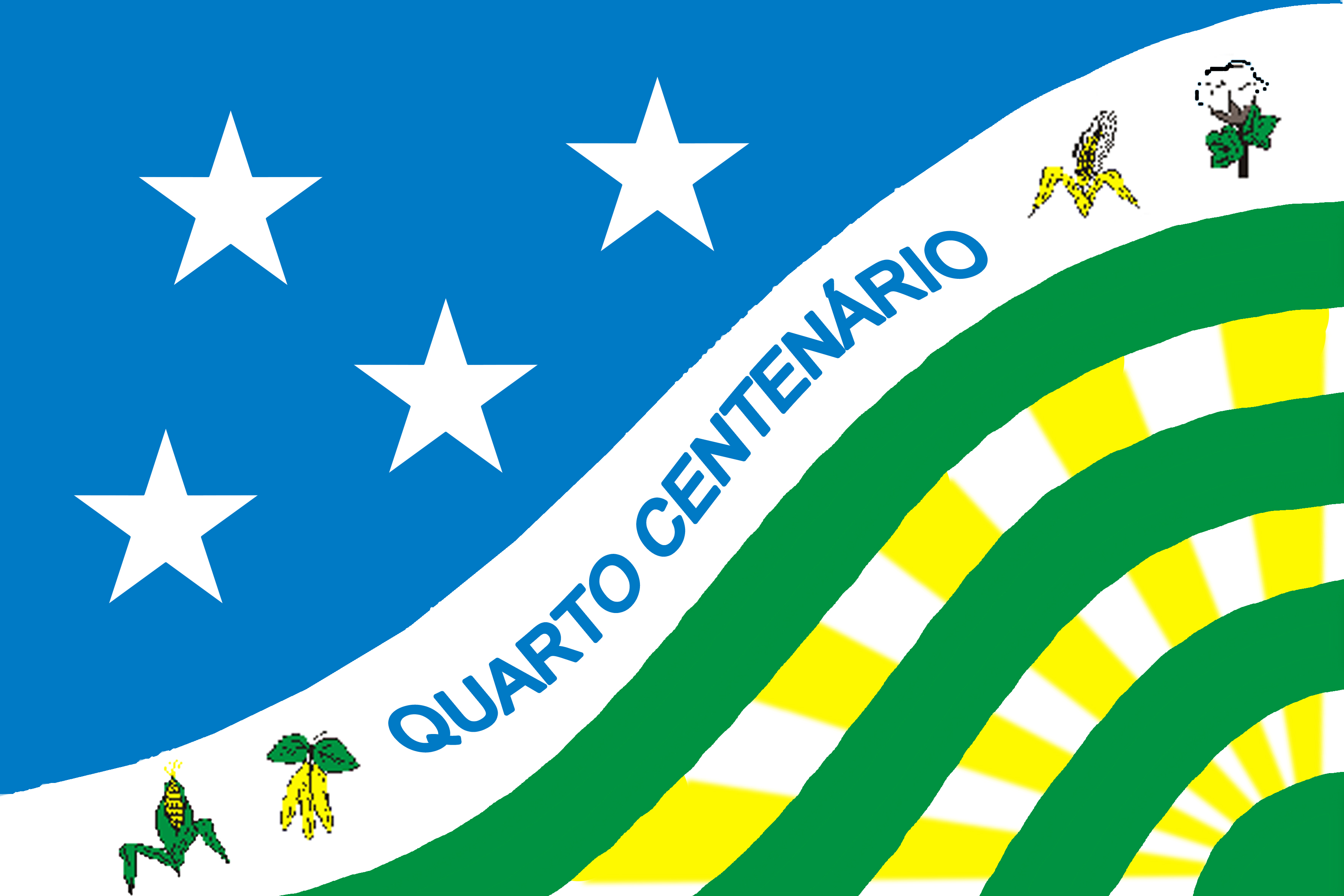
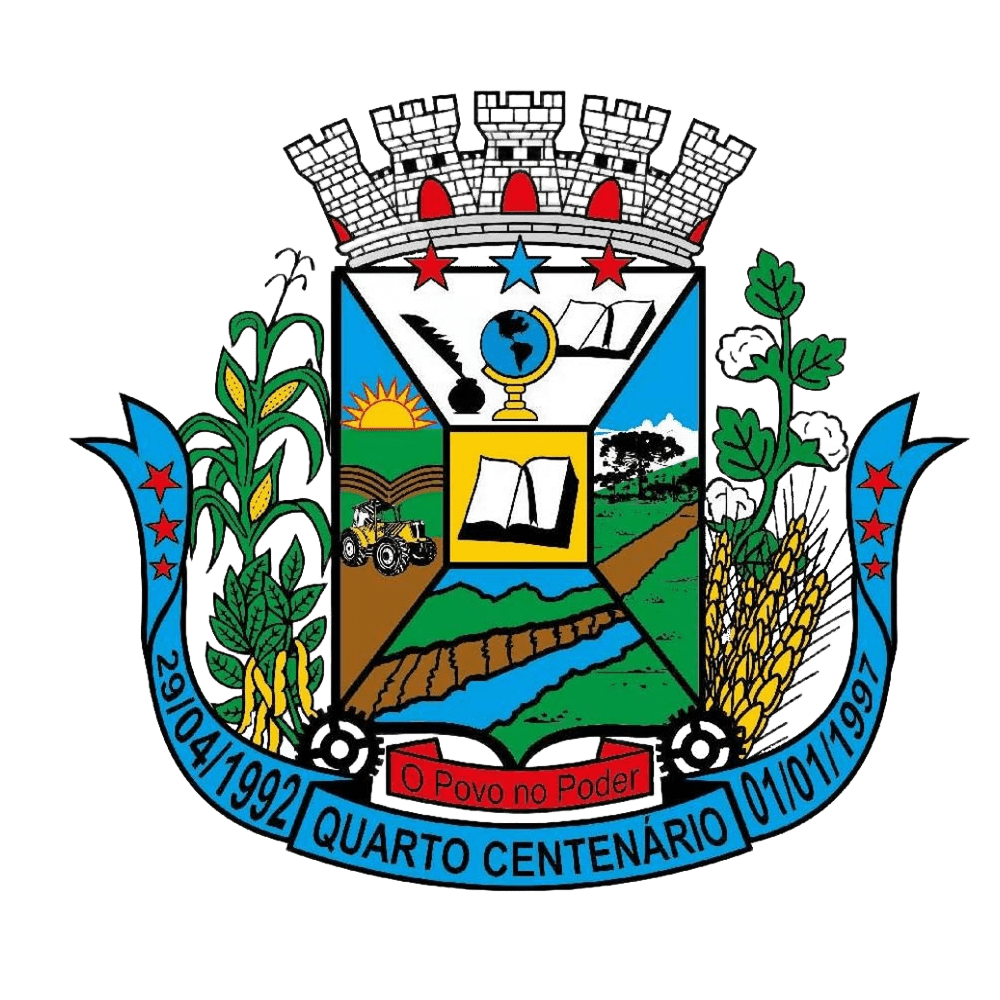
- Flag Seal

- Country: Brazil
- State: Paraná

Quarto Centenário is a municipality in the state of Paraná (PR) in Brazil.

The municipality relies mostly on agriculture - soybeans, corn, and has few industries, the most important Coagel COAMO and integrated cooperatives are cooperatives. It has a state college, in the town, other colleges in their districts, schools, municipal headquarters and in their districts, estimated population of 4,465 as of 2020. It has 5 catholic churches and one Evangelical Church (Parish of Our Lady of Fatima) that was founded on 22 April 1977 by decree of the diocesan Bishop of Campo Mourão Dom Eliseu Simões Mendes.
