= Tarcísio Burity =

Brazilian politician (1938–2003)

Tarcísio de Miranda Burity (João Pessoa, November 28, 1938 – São Paulo, July 8, 2003) was a Brazilian jurist, politician, writer and professor. He was a federal deputy and, twice, governor of Paraíba. He was also a prosecutor and professor at the Federal University of Paraíba.

== Career ==
He studied law at the Federal University of Paraíba, before earning a master's degree in sociology of education at the University of Poitiers, France, and a PhD in political science at the Graduate Institute of International Studies in Geneva. Before entering politics, he was a public prosecutor in the municipality of Araruna, and later, a professor at the Federal University of Paraíba, where he taught law, philosophy, the sociology of education and the history of education. At the Federal University of Paraíba, he also held administrative positions, such director of the faculty of law.

In 1975, he was appointed state secretary of Education and Culture by Governor Ivan Bichara. In 1979, he became governor of Paraíba. In 1982, he resigned from office to run for a seat in the Chamber of Deputies, receiving the second highest vote in the history of Paraíba: approximately 173,000 votes, surpassed only by Pedro Cunha Lima in the 2014 elections.

=== Assassination attempt by Ronaldo Cunha Lima ===
A notorious incident occurred in 1993, while Ronaldo Cunha Lima was governor. Burty, former governor at the time, accused Cunha Lima's son of corruption with respect to siphoning off money to be used for drought relief. On 5 November 1993, Governor Cunha Lima entered the Gulliver Restaurant in João Pessoa and shot Burity twice while he was eating. Burity spent days in a coma, but eventually recovered. After hours of being jailed, Cunha Lima was greeted on his balcony by a large crowd of fans that supported him defending his family's honor. A few days after the shooting, the city council of Campina Grande presented Cunha Lima with a medal of merit. Càssio Cunha Lima, son of Ronaldo, later become governor of the province for two times, until his impeachment in 2009.
