= Rafafá =

Presenter, comedian and Brazilian politician, served as federal deputy

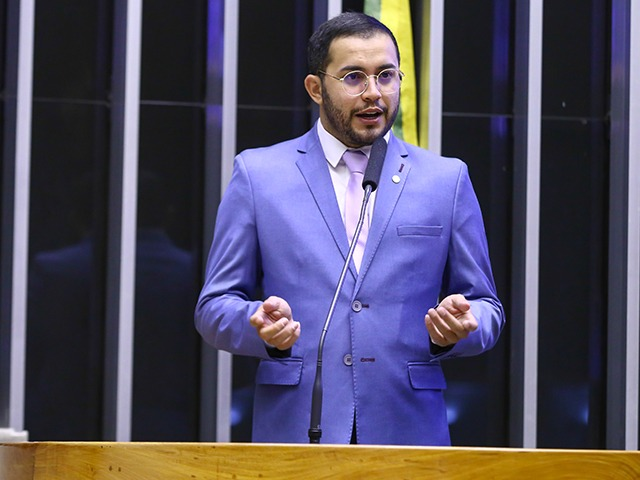
- In office April 14, 2021 – July 29, 2021

Personal details
- Born: 22 August 1990 (age 36)
- Party: UB
- Other political affiliations: DEM (2012–2015) PSDB 2015–2019) PSD (2020–2021) PSDB (2021–22)

Rafael Pereira Sousa (born 22 August 1990), also known as Rafafá, is a Brazilian TV host, comedian, and politician who took office as a federal deputy after Pedro Cunha Lima took a leave of absence from the position.

== Political career ==
=== Federal Representative ===
He ran for federal deputy, championing animal rights, the rights of the poor, and LGBT issues, and received 13,940 votes.

He took the office on 14 April 2021, while the then-incumbent, Representative Pedro Cunha Lima, was on leave.

=== Municipal Elections ===
He ran in the 2012, 2016, 2020, and 2024 elections for city council in Campina Grande, but was unsuccessful in his first three attempts, receiving 455 votes in 2012, 1,254 votes in 2016, and 2,094 in 2020. But in 2024, he was elected with 4,820 votes, making him the candidate with the most votes and, historically, the first openly LGBTQIAPN+ person to be elected in Campina Grande.
