= Giorgia Prates =

Brazilian politician

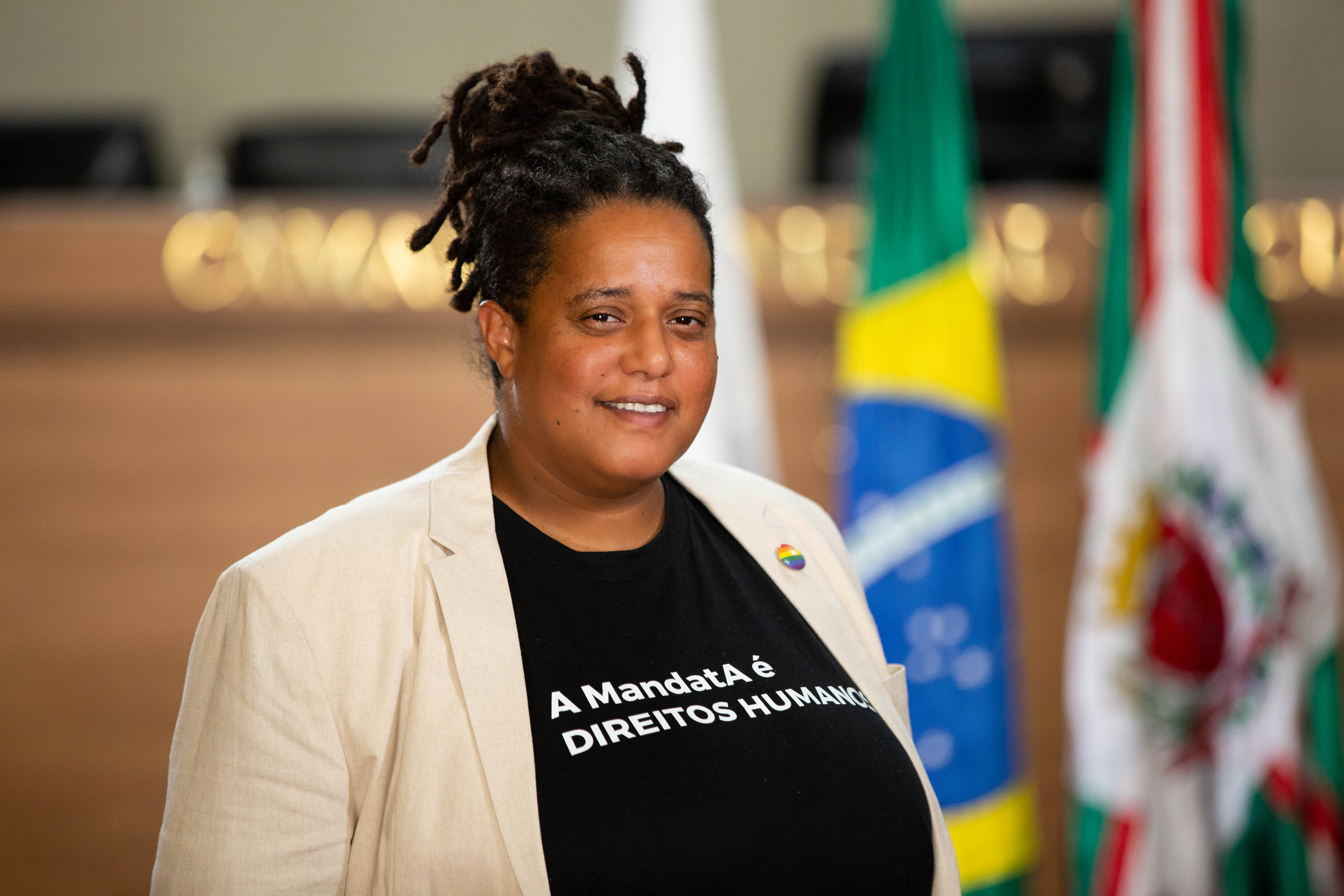

Councillor of Curitiba
- Incumbent
- Assumed office 31 January 2023

Personal details
- Born: Giorgia Tais Xavier Prates; 23 September 1978 (age 48) São Paulo
- Party: PT
- Education: Universidade Federal do Paraná
- Profession: Photojournalist
- Website: https://giorgiaprates.com.br/

Giorgia Tais Xavier Prates (born 23 September 1978) is a Brazilian politician, photojournalist, artist, and human rights activist.

== Biography ==
Originally from São Paulo, she moved to Curitiba in 2006.

She holds a degree in photography from Universidade Tuiuti and a specialization in Journalism from Faculdade Faveni. Currently, she is studying Pedagogy at Universidade Federal do Paraná. Her career in photojournalism includes work with the Coletivo CWB Resiste and the newspaper Brasil de Fato. Additionally, she is the official photographer for Paraná in the United Nations Development Programme (UNDP Brazil) and a Cannes award winner with the film "The Uniform That Never Existed."

Giorgia entered politics motivated by the realities she documented as a photojournalist. In 2020, she was elected councilwoman in Curitiba for the Workers' Party (PT) with the "Mandata Preta", a collective formed exclusively by women, mostly black women. She is the second black woman elected as a councilwoman in the capital of Paraná, the first openly LGBTQ councillor in Curitiba, and the first through a popular mandate.

Her work in the Curitiba City Council is marked by the defense of human rights, citizenship, and public safety. She participates in various committees and parliamentary fronts, including the Human Rights Committee and the Parliamentary Front for the Rights of the Homeless Population.

Giorgia is inspired by figures like Marielle Franco and seeks to give voice to marginalized people, promoting inclusion and equality. Her trajectory is an example of resilience and dedication to the fight for social justice.
