= Isa Penna =

Brazilian politician

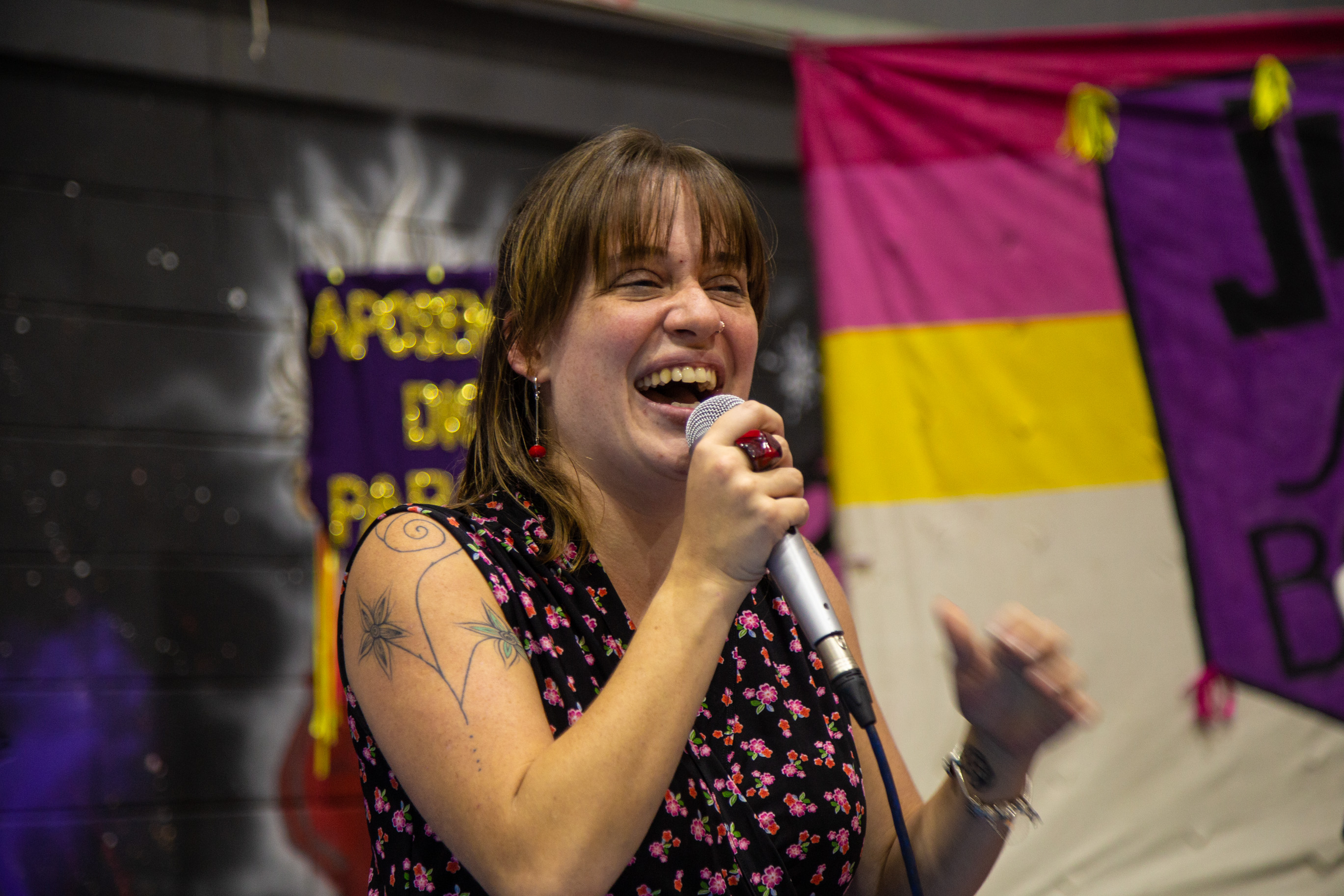
- Penna in 2019

Member of the Legislative Assembly of São Paulo
- In office 15 March 2019 – 15 March 2023
- Constituency: São Paulo

Personal details
- Born: Isadora Martinatti Penna; 28 March 1991 (age 35) São Paulo, Brazil
- Party: Socialism and Liberty Party (2011–2022) Communist Party of Brazil (2022–present)
- Occupation: Politician, lawyer, activist
- Profession: Labor lawyer
- Known for: Feminism, LGBTQ rights activism

Isadora Martinatti Penna (São Paulo, 28 March 1991) is a Brazilian labor lawyer, feminist, LGBTQ rights activist and politician affiliated with the Communist Party of Brazil (PCdoB). She was a state deputy of São Paulo between 2019 and 2023.

== Political career ==
Isa joined the Socialism and Liberty Party (PSOL) in March 2011. She ran in the 2014 elections at the age of 23, when she was a candidate for state deputy. She was not elected, as she received only 6,915 votes. In 2016, she ran for election to the São Paulo City Council and received more than 12,000 votes, becoming the first alternate for PSOL. In March 2017, Isa Penna assumed the position of councilwoman for 30 days, after Toninho Vespoli took a leave of absence, and with Sâmia Bomfim formed a 100% female and feminist bench in the São Paulo City Council during Women's Month.

In 2018, she was elected state representative with 53,838 votes, representing the PSOL/PCB coalition. She assumed the position of state deputy in the Legislative Assembly of São Paulo (Alesp) in 2019 along with three other parliamentarians elected by PSOL.

In October 2019, during a speech in the plenary session, she was accused of indecency for reciting the poem "sou puta, sou mulher" (lit. 'I'm a slut, I'm a woman') by the poet Helena Ferreira.

In March 2022, she announced her affiliation with the Communist Party of Brazil (PCdoB), aiming to run for federal deputy for the state of São Paulo, but was unsuccessful in the election.

== Personal life ==
Isa Penna identifies as a feminist, bisexual, and an activist for minority rights.

== Attacks ==
=== 2017 ===
In March 2017, during an alleged argument with councilman Camilo Cristófaro (PSB) at the São Paulo City Council, Cristófaro called Isa a "slut" and a "terrorist" and told her not to be surprised if she "got slapped in the street." Isa classified the episode as an "aggression" and an "attempt at verbal and physical intimidation." Cristófaro denied the accusations. In April 2017, Isa's cell phone number was exposed via WhatsApp as a way to pressure her in favor of the Escola Sem Partido movement (which she opposes). One of the messages labeled her as "in favor of indoctrination in schools." Isa classified the situation as a form of "intimidation."

=== Sexual harassment in 2020 ===
In December 2020, during the voting on the state budget for 2021, a security camera at the Legislative Assembly of the State of São Paulo captured the moment when deputy Fernando Cury groped the side of Isa Penna's breast. Cury denied the harassment, claiming it was a hug and apologized, but Isa Penna denounced him for sexual harassment and indecency, demanding the revocation of his mandate. Cury's mandate was interrupted by the Legislative Assembly of the State of São Paulo (ALESP) on 1 April 2021.

With the aim of pressuring for the removal of Fernando Cury from office, personalities and civil society organizations carried out a campaign entitled "Por uma Punição Exemplar" (For an Exemplary Punishment) whose website allowed the sending of messages to pressure the deputies of the Legislative Assembly of the State of São Paulo to remove the parliamentarian. The campaign included writer Beatriz Bracher, cultural manager Mari Stockler, director Daniela Thomas, lawyer Rafael Poço, designer Julia Mariani, and administrator Maísa Diniz, co-founder of Vote Nelas, as well as the organizations 342 Artes, Update, Elas no Poder, Girl Up, and Vamos Juntas.

Open letters and petitions demanding Cury's removal from office were also published, one of which included signatories such as actresses Patrícia Pillar, Alessandra Negrini, and Letícia Sabatella; writers Milton Hatoum and Antonio Prata; historian Lilia Moritz Schwarcz; lawyers Alberto Toron and Augusto Arruda Botelho; and musicians Nando Reis and Tony Bellotto.

Those who voted for Cury's removal from office were rapporteur Emídio de Souza (PT), congresswoman Erica Malunguinho (PSOL), Barros Munhoz (PSDB), and the president of the Council, Maria Lúcia Amaray (PSDB). However, the group that defended the more lenient penalty proposed by Moura won; this group was composed only of men and included Adalberto Freitas (PSL), Wellington Moura (author of the vote), Delegado Olim (PP), Alex Madureira (PSD), and Estevam Galvão (DEM).

In addition to being suspended from ALESP, Cury was also expelled from his then party, Cidadania, as a result of the incident, and is now affiliated with the Brazil Union party. In April 2021, the Public Prosecutor's Office filed criminal charges against Cury, which were accepted by the São Paulo courts in December 2021. On 6 December 2023, Cury was sentenced to one year, two months, and twelve days in prison, under an open regime, which was converted into a fine of R$ 26,400 and community service.

On 8 October 2025, the Superior Court of Justice upheld Cury's conviction, making him ineligible for office for 8 years.
