= Campo Mourão =

Municipality in Paraná, Brazil

- Municipality
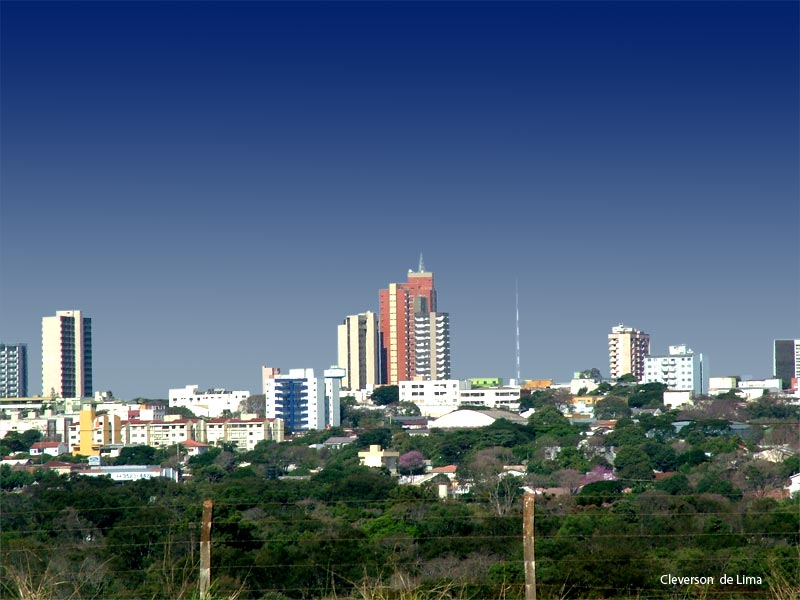
- Partial view of Campo Mourao

- Flag Coat of arms

- Campo Mourão Localization
- Coordinates: 24°02′45″S 52°22′58″W
- Country: Brazil
- Region: Southern
- State: Paraná

Government
  - Type: Democracy
  - Mayor: Douglas Fabrício

Area
  - Total: 292.3 sq mi (757.1 km^{2})
- Elevation: 2,070 ft (630 m)

Population (2022 Census)
  - Total: 99,432
  - Estimate (2025): 104,122
  - Density: 290/sq mi (113/km^{2})
- Time zone: UTC -3
- Area code: 044
- Website: https://www.campomourao.pr.gov.br/

Campo Mourão is a municipality in the state of Paraná in Brazil. Its population in 2022 Census was 99,432. The people from Campo Mourão are called Mourãoenses.

== History ==
The region of the "Fields" bordered by the Atlantic forest and Araucaria, headquarters of the Nation Guarani, began to be visited by the Spanish Jesuits between 1524 and 1541 and by the Paulist from 1628. The region belonged to the former Spanish possession call Guairá Province, with capital in Asunción, Paraguay today.

In 1765 it began to be raided by government militias in the captaincy of São Paulo, who named the valley between the wilderness and rivers Ivaí Piquiri of "Campos do Mourão" in homage to the governor of the captaincy of São Paulo, Luís António de Sousa Botelho Mourão (commonly known as Morgado de Mateus).

In the 1890s the natural pasture and native vegetation of the "Campo Mourão" served as a resting spot for travelers who passed through the region, playing herds to negotiate in Mato Grosso do Sul in 1903 came and stood at "Campos do Mourão "The family of São Paulo Matheus Vieira dos Santos (better known as Tirso) Baron Portuguese Henrique Cardoso of Jesus, with his wife, Baroness Sarah Elizabeth Cardoso, and admired and prestigious family of William, followed by Andrade, Caramel, Davanso, Rinaldo, Oliveira, Mendonça, Flores, Ribeiro Mendes and guarapuavanos Gustavo, Paulatti Peri, John Benedict, Norberto Marcondes, Jorge Walter (Russian), among other pioneers such as Barbara Louise Ferreira Tiago Hobold followed by their families Metchko, Brzezinski, Staniszewski, Hruschka, Schumoski, Zalewski, Klanke, Wronski, Slomp, Kwitshal, Behrens, Seratiuk, Almeida, Heickhoff, Lokonski, Denker and others with Germans, Ukrainians, Poles, Italians and Japanese who settled in large areas within Campos do Mourão. Campo Mourão until 1943 belonged to the Guarapuava.

In 1947 Campo Mourão was made a separate municipality. Its first mayor was José Antonio dos Santos appointed in October 1947 and then Pedro Viriato de Sousa Filho became the first elected mayor. Until the 1960s the city of Campo Mourão understand all the micro and 12 municipalities that were part of today to their administrative districts. In the 80s, were separated from their last two administrative districts: Luiziana Lighthouse and the West, leaving just the tutelage of his district Piquirivaí. Has its origins in ancient roads where they went flying circus and stores coming from Mato Grosso and São Paulo to destinations west of Paraná

== Economy ==
The city is predominantly agricultural. Its main agricultural products are soybeans and corn. Campo Mourão is home to Coamo, the largest cooperative in Brazil and the third largest in the world. In recent years, the city has attracted large companies such as Colacril Paraná Ltda (largest adhesive manufacturing plant in Latin America), VRI Electronics and Frangobras (Tyson Foods of Brazil).

=== Highways ===
Campo Mourão, due to its location at a major junction of highways, receives a large flow of vehicles, especially those heading to Foz do Iguaçu, the main tourist attraction in the frontier with Argentina and Paraguay. The following highways cross the county area of Campo Mourao:

- 487 - Campo Mourão/Cruzeiro do Oeste (Boiadeira)/Guarapuava/Curitiba
- BR 158 - Campo Mourão/Peabiru - Campo Mourão/Roncador
- PR 317 - Campo Mourão/Maringá
- BR 369 - Campo Mourão/Cascavel
- BR 272 - Campo Mourão/Goioerê - Campo Mourão/Barbosa Ferraz

=== Airport ===
Campo Mourão is served by Cel. Geraldo Guias de Aquino Airport.

== Culture ==
=== Touristic sights ===
The main sights of Campo Mourão are:

- St. Joseph Cathedral (in Portuguese: Catedral São José)

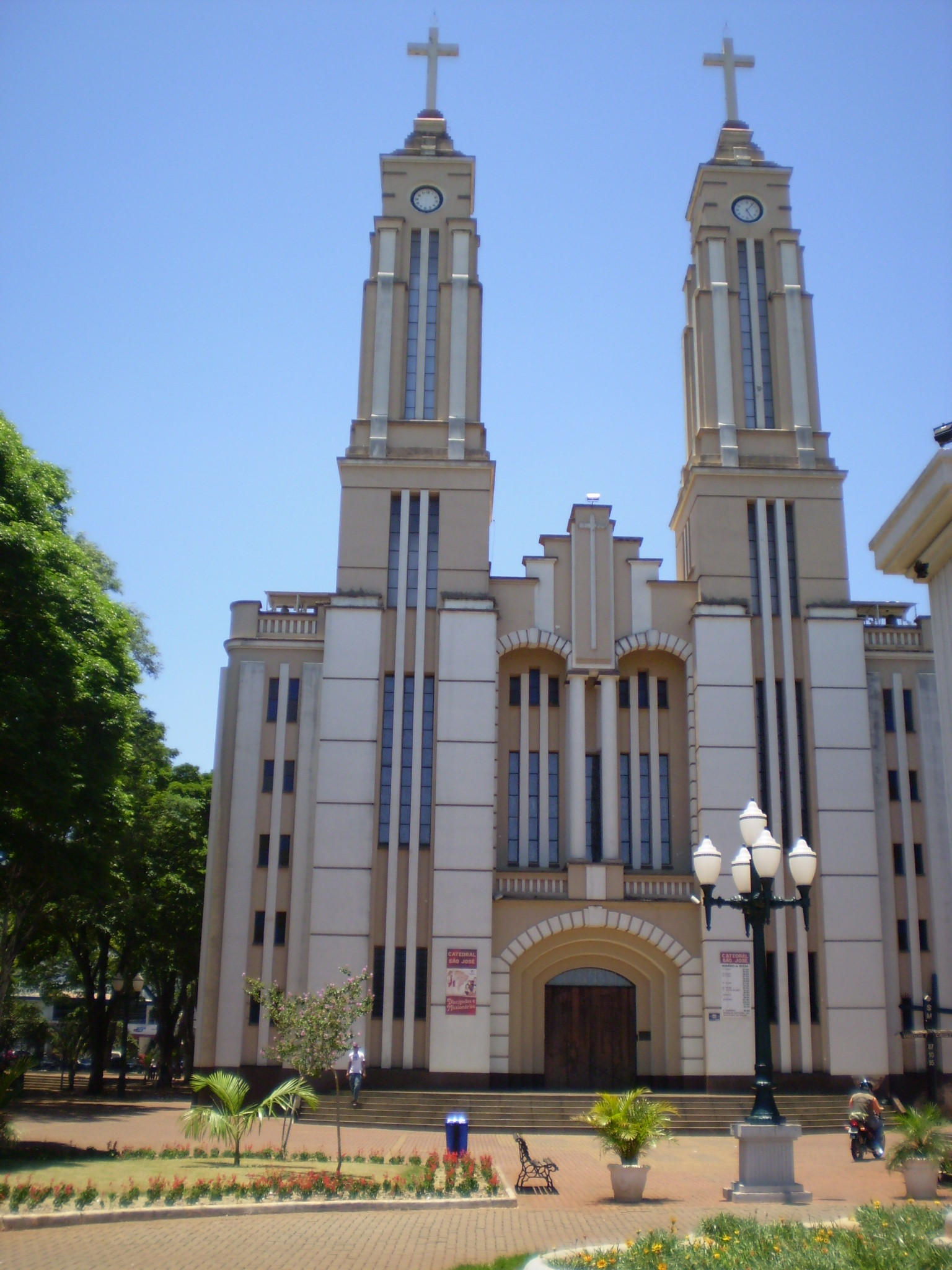
St. Joseph Cathedral.

The Cathedral of St. Joseph Campo Mourão, episcopal see of the Roman Catholic Diocese of Campo Mourão, is based on the same design as the Mother Church of the Pure Heart of Mary of St. Benedict South.

- Ecological Station Savannah (Portuguese: Estação Ecológica do Cerrado)

On 1.3 acres (5,300 m^{2}) of conservation species are remnants of the Old Quaternary, and the Cerrado southernmost of the planet. It is considered a relic by scholars and welcomes scientists all over the world.

- Park Lake (Portuguese: Parque do Lago)

The Municipal Park Joaquim Teodoro de Oliveira is one of the cards in the city. Has jogging track that enters the woods, playground sand, greenhouses, Scout Group Headquarters City, orchid, French Garden and a lake with several fish species.

- Blue Lake State Park (Portuguese: Parque Estadual Lago Azul)

It has high biodiversity alongside its 70 million cubic meters of water, which are open to sports such as jet skiing, water skiing, boating, canoeing and recreational fishing. It also has a large forest area with summer houses.

=== Education ===
Campo Mourão is considered a developed city despite being predominantly agricultural. There are five institutions of higher education and an institution of professional education in the city:

- Faculdade Estadual de Ciências e Letras (Fecilcam)
- Universidade Tecnológica Federal do Paraná (UTFPR)
- Centro Educacional Integrado - (CEI)
- Faculdade União de Campo Mourão - UNICAMPO
- SENAC-PR

=== Estação da Luz (Light Station) ===
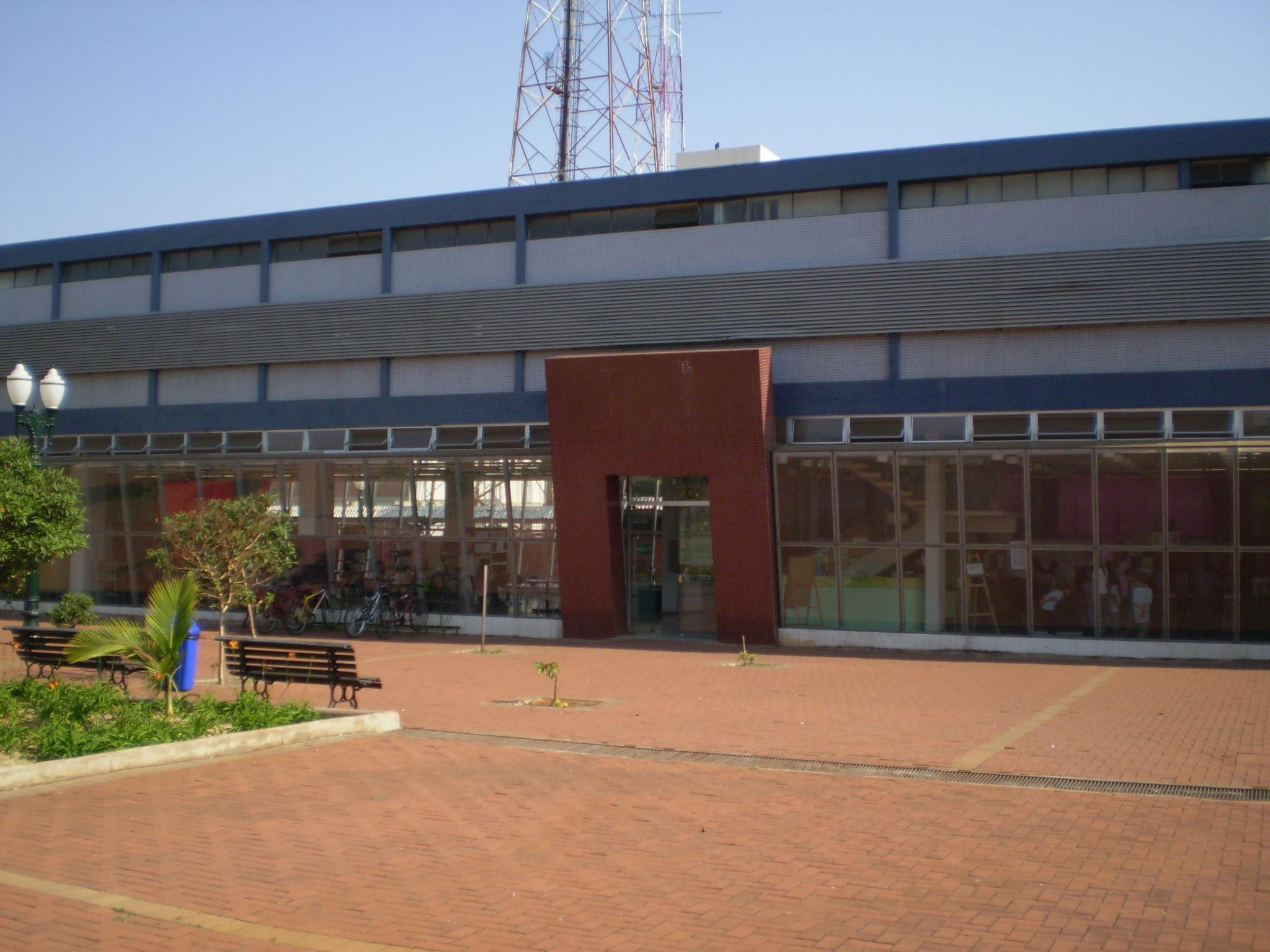
Estação da Luz.

One of the most modern cultural facilities in the city, located in Getúlio Vargas Square, in the central area of Campo Mourão. It now houses the collection of the Municipal Public Library, and Professor Egydio Martello. The building also serves as the headquarters of the Mourãoense Academy of Arts and offers space for classes and art exhibitions, open to the public free of charge. The building also houses the Mourãoense Academy of Letters, which includes writers such as Max Moreno.

=== Teatro de Campo Mourão ===
Theatre with capacity for 470 seats is held annually the season of theater, as well as projects for youth, adults and children. It has 1500 meters of built area, foyer for 100 people, stage 13 by 11 meters, dressing rooms, cenotécnica and modern system of sound and light.

=== Municipal Museum Deolindo Mendes Pereira ===
It houses the memory and history of Campo Mourão, with reports, pictures and testimonies by family members through testimonies, retraced all the aspects that influence its historical evolution.

=== Culinary specialty : Carneiro no Buraco "Gully in the Hole" ===
The lamb in the pit is the typical dish of Campo Mourão. The dish was created by three pioneers of the city in the early '60s, after watching a movie in which cowboys preparing food over hot coals, in a hole dug in the ground. Enio Queiroz, Joaquim Teodoro Ferreira de Oliveira and Caldas Saul, all deceased, were the pioneers in the development of delicacy.

At first the dish was served only sporadically at parties of friends, in the 80s has also served when officials visited the city. A movement led by local guild of the Foul Mouth took the official dish of delicacy as in 1990 and the first Festival of the Sheep in the Hole was performed in the following year. The event is always held the second weekend of July. The National Festival of the Sheep Hole ended in turning the dish in Campo Mourão true symbol of being a very important festival, about 150,000 people annually prestige to the event, publicizing the City throughout Brazil and other countries.

=== Sports and Leisure ===
The municipality has a representative Paranaense de Futsal Championship - Gold Key. Futsal is the Campo Mourão / Fecam that this year was 13th place in the competition. The previous year, Futsal Campo Mourão won two significant titles: the South Futsal Cup and the Open Games of Paraná, which was won after fasting for 18 years.

In football, a team representing the city in competition state, the Sport Club Campo Mourão, affectionately called the "Lion of the Valley" by its fans, who this year competed in the Campeonato Paranaense Second Division of professional football, being in sixth place, In last year who represented the county was the Associação Desportiva Atlética do Paraná (ADAP), who became vice-champion of Paraná in 2006. The sport of Campo Mourão, in general, has achieved significant results in Paraná, using an excellent grassroots work carried out in sports such as athletics, handball, basketball, soccer, volleyball, GR and table tennis, among others.

In 2006, the city ranked eighth in JOJUPs, in Pato Branco, and fourth in the Japs, who were based in Maringá. In 2007, the official competitions were again disputed. In Paranavaí, Northwestern State Youth Games in Paraná, the city finished eighth among all participating municipalities, especially the Female Futsal team, which won the title. The Open Games of Paraná, in turn, were held in Toledo in the west of the state in its 50th edition (Historical), with the council being in sixth place overall.

Besides football, Campo Mourão Category b handball game was well in school in 2008, ranking eighth in the competition after eliminating Londrina and Toledo.

In recent years, basketball is evolving (regarded by some as the second-largest force in the form of Paraná), and peaked with the conquest of the Paranaense Championship of Basketball in 2009. The greatest ambition of the council (responsible for the team) is to enter a team in NBB.

== Geography ==
=== Climate ===
The climate of Campo Mourão, is classified as Cfa: mesothermal humid subtropical climate, with cool summers and frequent frosts in May each year, with a tendency of concentration of rainfall during the summer months, without a dry season. The average temperature in January (the hottest month) is 22.9 °C and the coldest month (July) is 12.7 °C, with an average annual temperature of 17.2 °C, its lower temperature was -9.8 °C in 1975 with a record of moderate snow, there have been reports of snow also in 1889, 1912, 1943, 1955, 1957, 1975, 1981, 1982, 1988. Its highest temperature was 35.7 °C in 1934 and 2009 also at 35 °C. The rainfall have on average between 1,400 mm and 1,500 mm per year. The prevailing winds in the region are from the northeast quadrant, and in winter the winds blow from south and southwest.

Climate data for Campo Mourão (1981–2010)
Month	Jan	Feb	Mar	Apr	May	Jun	Jul	Aug	Sep	Oct	Nov	Dec	Year
Mean daily maximum °C (°F)	29.6 (85.3)	29.5 (85.1)	29.5 (85.1)	27.6 (81.7)	23.7 (74.7)	22.5 (72.5)	22.5 (72.5)	25.1 (77.2)	26.1 (79.0)	28.1 (82.6)	29.3 (84.7)	29.5 (85.1)	26.9 (80.4)
Daily mean °C (°F)	23.8 (74.8)	23.4 (74.1)	23.1 (73.6)	21.1 (70.0)	17.6 (63.7)	16.2 (61.2)	15.8 (60.4)	17.6 (63.7)	19.3 (66.7)	21.6 (70.9)	22.8 (73.0)	23.5 (74.3)	20.5 (68.9)
Mean daily minimum °C (°F)	19.1 (66.4)	18.8 (65.8)	18.0 (64.4)	16.1 (61.0)	12.8 (55.0)	11.4 (52.5)	10.7 (51.3)	11.7 (53.1)	13.5 (56.3)	16.1 (61.0)	17.4 (63.3)	18.5 (65.3)	15.3 (59.5)
Average precipitation mm (inches)	213.2 (8.39)	159.6 (6.28)	133.7 (5.26)	123.4 (4.86)	142.3 (5.60)	97.0 (3.82)	75.8 (2.98)	69.4 (2.73)	142.7 (5.62)	165.8 (6.53)	143.2 (5.64)	171.0 (6.73)	1,637.1 (64.45)
Average precipitation days (≥ 1.0 mm)	13	12	10	8	8	6	6	5	9	10	8	11	106
Average relative humidity (%)	84.3	85.2	82.6	82.7	84.6	85.5	82.7	77.8	77.3	78.8	78.0	81.3	81.7
Mean monthly sunshine hours	208.6	182.1	215.7	205.3	186.7	175.5	195.6	204.5	178.7	198.4	223.0	218.8	2,392.9
Source: Instituto Nacional de Meteorologia

=== Soil ===
The predominant soil is the Oxisol clay texture, deep, very fertile, and with high ability to sustain intensive agriculture.

=== Hydrography ===
The Township belongs to the Paraná Basin, including the important river Rio Mourão, which crosses the city from south to north. The flow of the river, coupled with the topography of its valley, offers the greatest potential hydrodynamic city, explored with the construction of the Plant Mourão. Other major rivers: Rio Km 119 and Rio do Campo.

== See also ==
- List of municipalities in Paraná
