= Max Moreno =

Brazilian writer (born 1968)

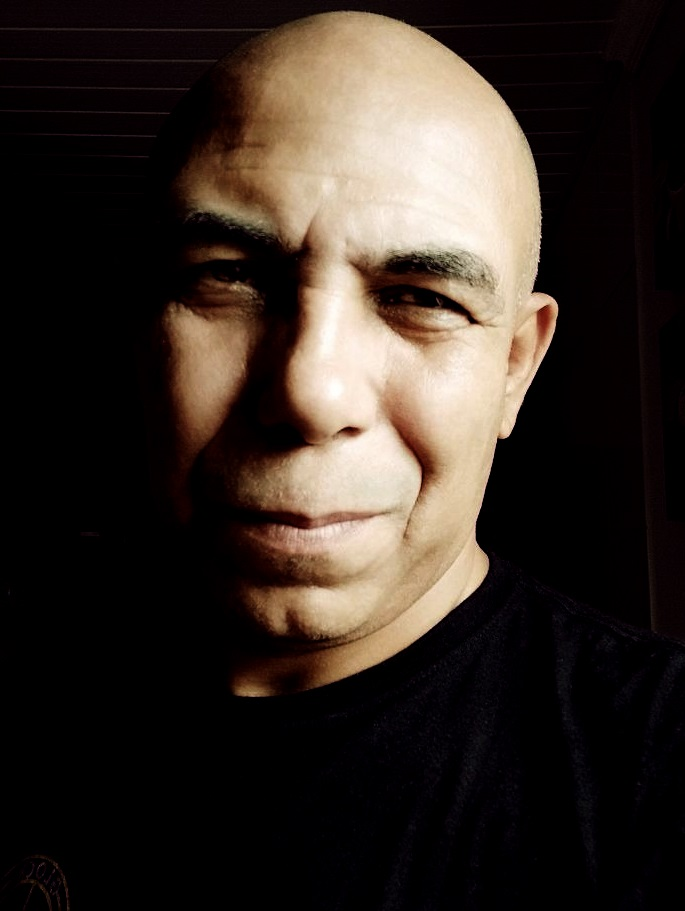
- Born: August 7, 1968 (age 58); Mariluz, Paraná, Brazil
- Occupation: Writer
- Years active: 2013–present
- Website: www.maxmorenooficial.com.br

Max Moreno Laurentino Nunes is a Brazilian writer (born August 7, 1968). The plots of his books involve crime, suspense and psychological fiction.

== Early life and education ==
Max was born in Paraná and grew up in São Paulo. He was eight years old when he began studying at Professor Walter Schepis State School in Guarujá, São Paulo. Max graduated from the UniCesumar (Centro Universitário de Maringá).

== Career ==
His debut book A Outra Sombra (The Other Shadow) was published in 2013. In 2015, the book was translated into English and published by America Star Publishing. In 2016, Max was invited to participate in a tribute to the German-American writer Charles Bukowski with the short story Vinte Pratas, as part of the collection Big Buka – Para Charles Bukowski, organized by Afobório – Editora Os Dez Melhores. In 2019, Max was one of the authors selected to participate in the IV Anthology of Contemporary Brazilian Poetry Além da Terra, Além do Céu, organized by Chiado Books Publishing. The book is named for a poem by Carlos Drummond de Andrade and assembles new talents from Brazilian Literature. "As Paredes Eram Brancas " his second novel was published in 2020. In 2021, his poem Contrário was published by the Chiado Books publishing in its second Brazilian collection Freedom – Anthology of Free Poetry. His latest book, Dias de Lua, was published in 2024 by Editorial Casa.

== Personal life ==
Max lives in Campo Mourão, Paraná with his wife and their two children

== Bibliography ==
Title	Year	Type	Notes
A Outra Sombra	2014	Novel	
The Other Shadow	2015	Novel	
Vinte Pratas	2015	Short story collection	
Rastejante	2019	Poetry collection	
As paredes eram brancas	2020	Novel	
Contrário	2021	Poetry collection	
Dias de Lua	2024	Novel	
