= Roncador, Paraná =

Coordinates: 24°36′10″S 52°16′30″W

Roncador
- Municipality
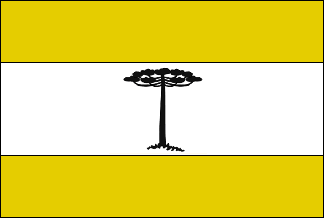
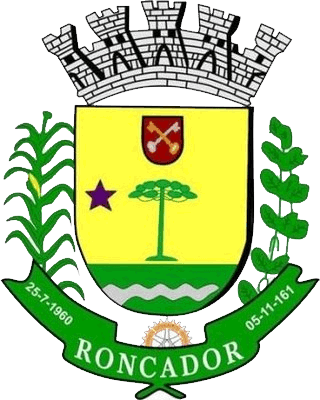
- Flag Seal

- Country: Brazil
- Region: Southern
- State: Paraná
- Mesoregion: Centro Ocidental Paranaense
- Emancipated: 5 November 1961

Government
  - Mayor: Marília Perotta Bento Gonçalves (União Brasil)

Area
  - Total: 286 sq mi (742 km^{2})
- Elevation: 2,500 ft (762 m)

Population (2020)
  - Total: 9,645
- Time zone: UTC−3 (BRT)
- Postal code (CEP): 87320-000
- Area code: +55 42

Roncador is a municipality in the state of Paraná in the Southern Region of Brazil.

== See also ==
- List of municipalities in Paraná
