= Clodoaldo Magalhães =

Brazilian politician (born 1975)

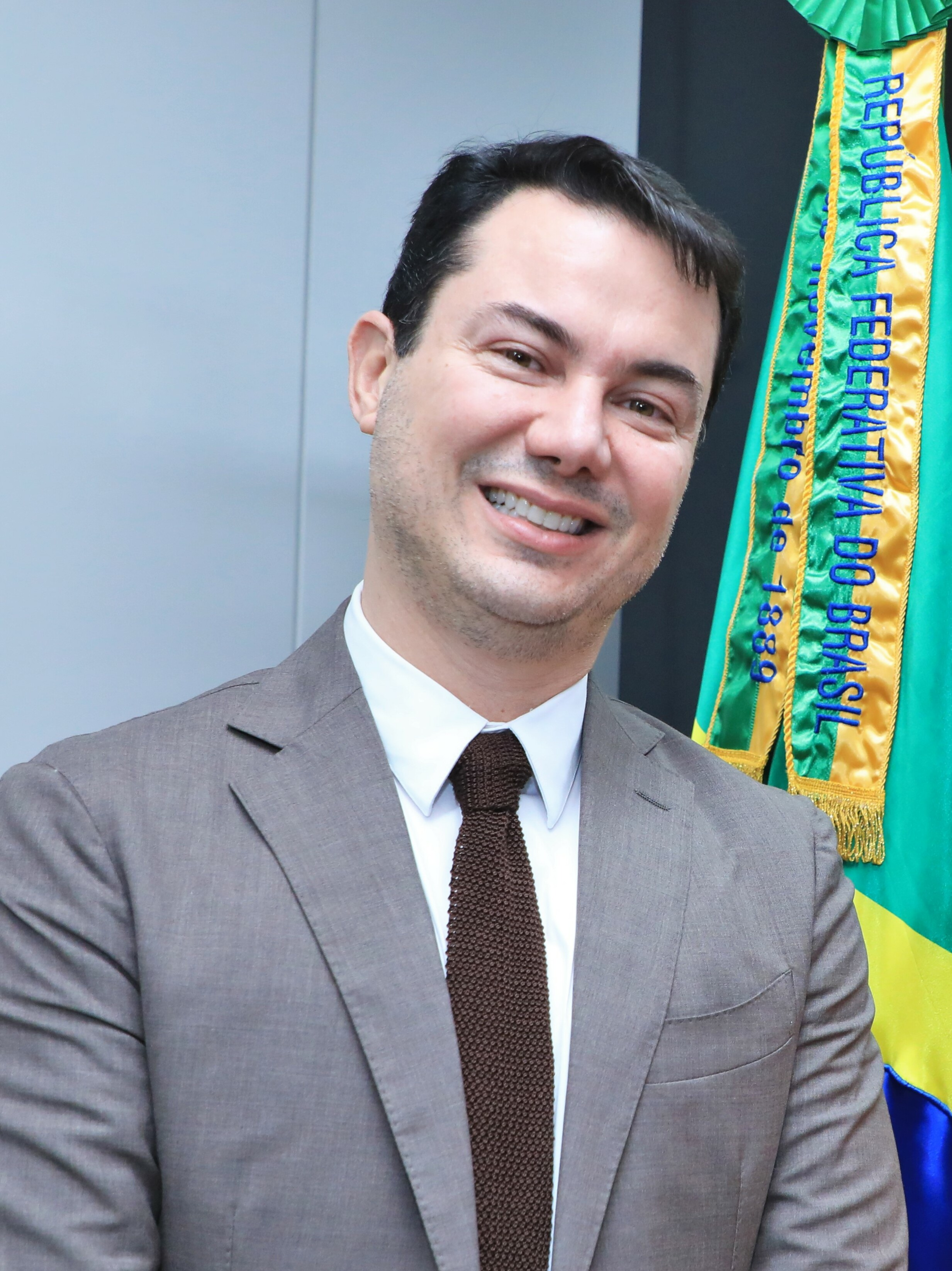
- Magalhães in 2023

Member of the Chamber of Deputies
- Incumbent
- Assumed office 1 February 2023
- Constituency: Pernambuco

Personal details
- Born: 13 November 1975 (age 50)
- Party: Green Party (since 2022)

Clodoaldo Magalhães Oliveira Lyra (born 13 November 1975) is a Brazilian politician serving as a member of the Chamber of Deputies since 2023. From 2007 to 2023, he was a member of the Legislative Assembly of Pernambuco.
