= Renildo José dos Santos =

Brazilian politician (1956–1993)

Renildo José dos Santos (2 April 1956 – 10 March 1993) was a Brazilian politician. Renildo is considered one of the first openly elected LGBTQ politicians in Brazil. In 1993, he was murdered after publicly declaring his bisexuality.

Son of Marinete Maria de Lima, Renildo was born in Coqueiro Seco, Alagoas. Renildo dos Santos became a municipal councilman in Coqueiro Seco. Renildo faced constant persecution and threats, being prevented from entering the Municipal Council and threatened with the loss of his mandate.

Renildo was kidnapped by armed men on March 10, 1993, and days later, his body was found mutilated and decapitated. The case had great international repercussion and was reported to Amnesty International. In 2015, those responsible for the crime began serving their sentences, after a Luiz Marcelo Falcão, a retired second lieutenant of the Alagoas Military Police, confessed to his involvement in the murder of Renildo José dos Santos. Falcão admitted to participating in the brutal crime, which occurred in March 1993, when Renildo was kidnapped, tortured, and decapitated. Falcão's confession also implicated José Renato de Oliveira, a local landowner, as the mastermind behind the murder. Oliveira, who was 80 years old at the time of his arrest, was accused of ordering the assassination due to Renildo's opposition to his political influence in Coqueiro Seco.

Renildo's memory is remembered by LGBTQ activists and he is honored with the Renildo José dos Santos Human Rights Award, created by the Grupo Gay da Bahia. This award recognizes individuals who contribute significantly to the promotion of citizenship and human rights in Brazil.
