= Michelle Melo (politician) =

Brazilian physician and politician

Member of the Legislative Assembly of Acre
- Incumbent
- Assumed office 1 February 2023

Councilwoman of Rio Branco
- In office 1 January 2021 – 1 February 2023
- Succeeded by: James do Lacen

Personal details
- Born: 1 June 1984 (age 42) Rio Branco, Acre, Brazil
- Party: UNIÃO (2026–present)
- Other political affiliations: PDT (2020–2026)
- Profession: Doctor

Michelle Melo is a Brazilian physician and politician who has represented Brazil Union and formerly the Democratic Labour Party in the Legislative Assembly of Acre.

== Biography ==
Melo was born in the city of Rio Branco in the western state of Acre in 1984. She was born to Nelsinho, from Cruzeiro do Sul, and Mrs. Dedé, from Manoel Urbano. She is the eldest of three daughters.

At the age on seventeen, she travelled to Spain to study medicine, but returned to Rio Branco to begin work as a doctor with Brazil's publicly funded health service, the Unified Health System (SUS).

In 2020, she ran in the municipal elections in Rio Branco for the Democratic Labour Party (PDT) for a council seat. She was elected with the highest amount of votes.

Melo ran for the Legislative Assembly of Acre as a candidate of the PDT in the 2022 election and won a seat with 5,990 votes.

In 2023, she was appointed, by Governor Gladson Cameli, the leader of the government of the Legislative Assembly.

Ahead of the 2026 Acre State Elections, Melo changed her political affiliation from the Democratic Labour Party to Brazil Union, stating it would allow her to "do more, and do better."

== Personal life ==
Melo is openly bisexual and presented two bills in 2023 on International LGBTQ Pride Day to combat discrimination against LGBTQ people.
