= Linda Brasil =

Brazilian politician and activist (born 1973)

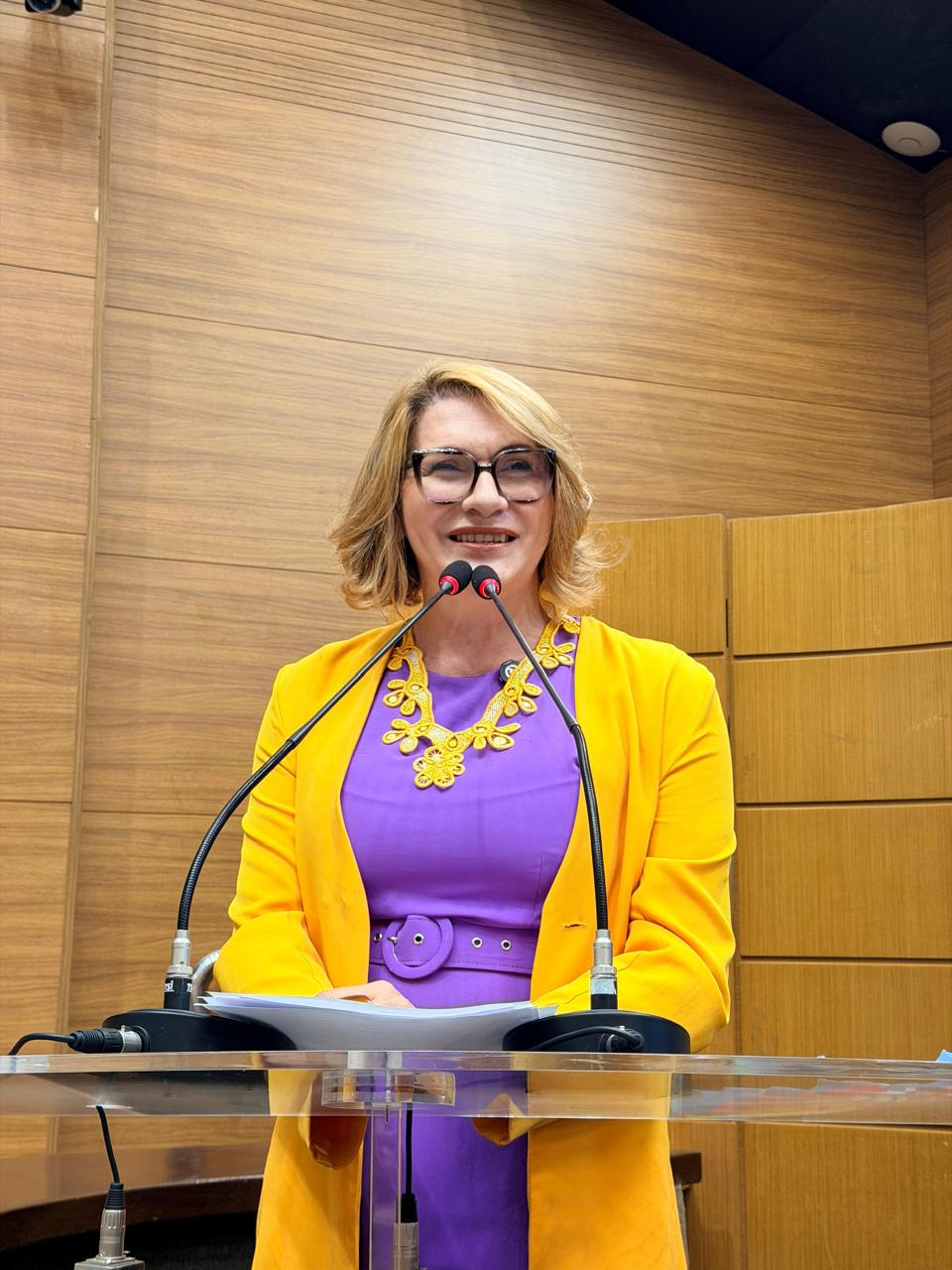
- Linda Brasil in 2026 at the Legislative Assembly of Sergipe

State Deputy of Sergipe
- Incumbent
- Assumed office 1 February 2023
- Constituency: Sergipe

Councilwoman of Aracaju
- In office 1 January 2021 – 31 January 2023

Personal details
- Born: Linda Brasil Azevedo Santos; 14 April 1973 (age 53) Santa Rosa de Lima, Sergipe, Brazil
- Party: PSOL (2015–present)
- Education: Federal University of Sergipe
- Occupation: Teacher; activist; politician
- Website: lindabrasilaracaju.com.br

Linda Brasil Azevedo Santos (born 14 April 1973) is a Brazilian teacher, LGBTQ rights activist, and politician who became the first trans woman elected to a parliamentary position in the state of Sergipe, Brazil. She was elected in 2020 as a member of the Socialism and Liberty Party.

Brasil was born in Santa Rosa de Lima, in the state of Sergipe. She attended the Federal University of Sergipe, attaining a Master's degree in Education. After attending university, she founded AmoSerTrans, an association of transgender people in the state of Sergipe. She also founded CasAmor Neide Silva, a shelter for LGBTQ youth in Aracaju.

== Biography ==
Brasil was born on 14 April 1973 in Santa Rosa de Lima, Sergipe, Brazil. As an adult, she moved to Aracaju and began working in an accounting firm. When she was 30, she left her job, came out as transgender, and opened a beauty salon. In 2013, Brasil filed an administrative proceeding with the Federal University of Sergipe, claiming a professor refused to use her preferred name, instead only referring to her as her legal name. Following the proceeding, the university passed an ordinance which allows the use of a preferred name in academic and administrative settings within the institution. While at the university, she helped found Coletivo Queer Transfeminista (Des)montadxs to discuss questions of gender and sexuality within both the university and Sergipe as a whole. She later became the first trans woman to graduate from the Federal University of Sergipe.

In 2015, Brasil partnered with other trans people and allies to create EducaTrans, a preparatory course for the Exame Nacional do Ensino Médio aimed at transgender students whose main objective was to expand visibility of trans people in the university environment and, later, the labor market.

In 2017, Brasil founded CasAmor, an NGO inspired by LGBT shelters in Brazil such as Casa 1 in São Paulo and Casa Nem in Rio de Janeiro. CasAmor aims to provide support to LGBT youth through volunteer work carried out by various professionals including psychologists, architects, designers, engineers, teachers and journalists. The program also aims to temporarily host people who do not have family support due to their sexual orientation or gender identity, as well as provide courses and workshops aimed at LGBT youth entering the job market. During the COVID-19 pandemic, CasAmor worked to deliver supplies such as food, cleaning supplies, and personal hygiene materials to LGBT individuals who were in a situation of social vulnerability. In 2021, CasAmor was renamed CasAmor Neide Silva to honor "Tia Neide", a volunteer and member of the advisory board who died of COVID-19 in March 2021.

== Political career ==
Brasil is affiliated with the Socialism and Liberty Party (PSOL), running on a platform of human rights, LGBTQ rights, the reduction of social injustices, the protection of minorities, the fight against machismo and sexism, racism, and the defense of democracy.

In 2016, Brasil ran for a city council position in Aracaju, receiving 26th place with 2,308 votes (0.83% of the total valid votes). She was the most voted-for candidate affiliated with the PSOL in Aracaju. Although there were 24 open seats, Brasil was not selected as an alternate. Brasil's supporters pointed out institutional transphobia during the campaign, as Brasil was required to register as male.

In 2018, Brasil ran for state deputy, becoming the 38th most voted-for candidate in Sergipe with 10,107 votes (0.93% of the total votes cast for the Legislative Assembly of Sergipe). She was the most-voted for candidate affiliated with the PSOL. Although the election was held throughout the state of Sergipe, 6,555 of her votes were from Aracaju. Due to a decision by the Superior Electoral Court about the 2018 elections, Brasil was allowed to run as a woman.

Due to the results of her previous attempts to run for office, and due to changes in electoral legislation, Brasil was considered a strong candidate by the PSOL to run for an Aracaju city council position. She was launched as a pre-candidate of the PSOL in late 2019, using the slogan "Courage to Transform". In 2020, Brasil was elected to the Aracaju city council, becoming the first trans councilwoman in the city's history. She was the most voted-for candidate affiliated with PSOL, receiving 5,733 votes. Due to this, she was able to preside over the first plenary session of the legislative in 2021.
