= Kátia Tapety =

Brazilian politician

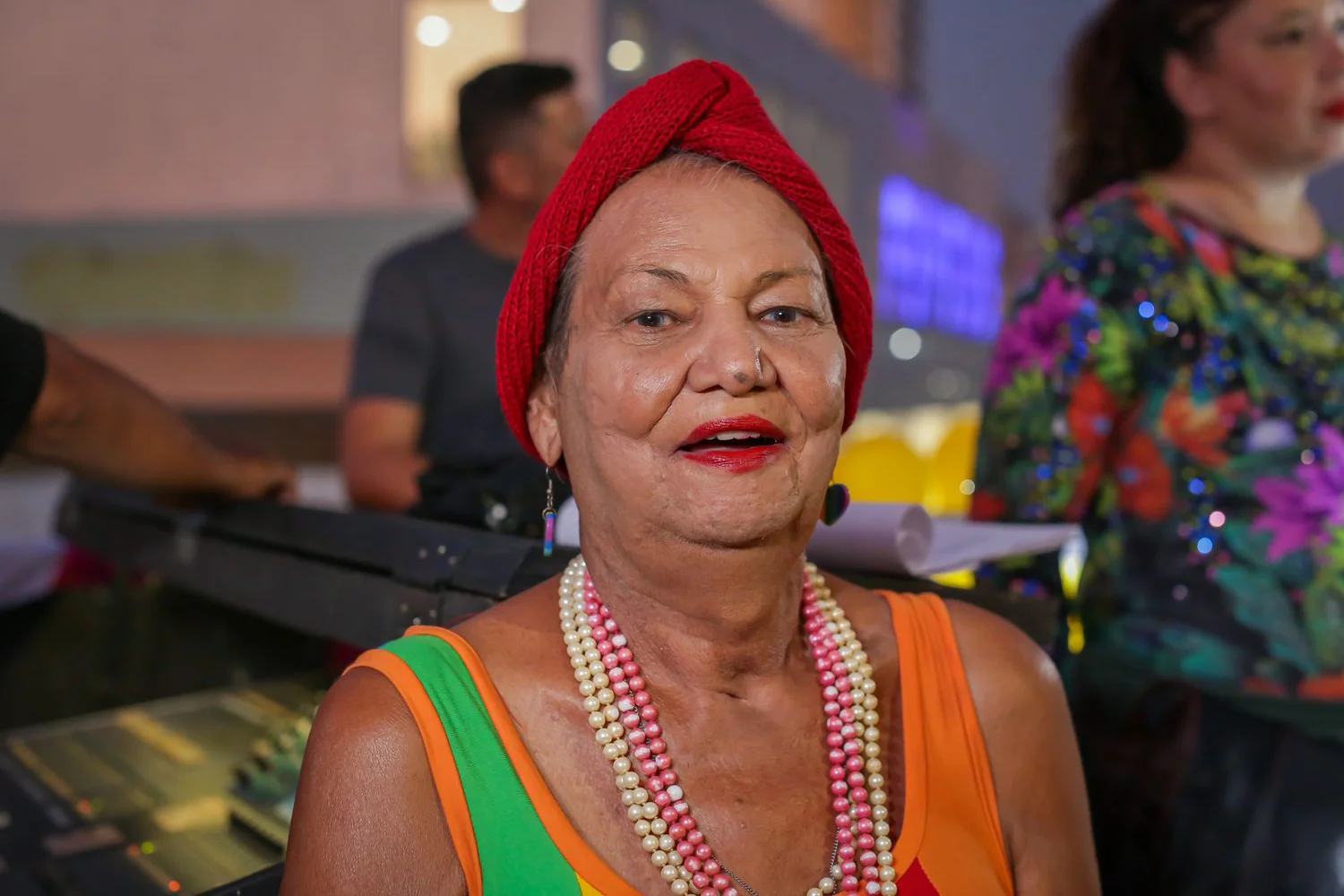

Vice-Mayor of Colônia do Piauí
- In office 1 January 2005 – 31 December 2008
- Mayor: Lúcia de Fátima de Sá

Alderwoman of Colônia do Piauí
- In office 1 February 1993 – 31 January 2004

President of the Municipal Chamber of Colônia do Piauí
- In office 1 February 2001 – 31 January 2002

Personal details
- Born: 24 April 1949 (age 77) Oeiras, Piauí, Brazil
- Party: PSB (-present)
- Other political affiliations: DEM (1992-2003); CIDADANIA (2003-)

Kátia Tapety (born 24 April 1949) is a Brazilian politician. She was the first transgender politician to be elected in Brazil.

== Early years ==
Tapety is the child of a family of politicians and until the age of 16 she lived practically hidden in the house. She went to school only until third grade of elementary school and after that, her parents kept her a recluse.

== Career ==
A resident of the municipality of Colônia do Piauí, 388 km south of Teresina, the Piauiense capital, Tapety joined the Liberal Front Party in which the councilman was elected in 1992, 1996 and 2000 (always first and foremost), then she next joined the Popular Socialist Party, then the party of Ciro Gomes, who was her political idol.

Tapety was also president of the Colônia do Piauí City Council from 2001 to 2002.

In Colônia do Piauí, Kátia is a public health official, but since she lives in a town of only 7,000 inhabitants, which is located in the countryside of the state of Piauí, she acts more as a "jack of all trades." She works as a councilor, midwife, community leader and health agent. Sometimes she also works as a social worker, psychologist, lawyer, driver and even a cowgirl. Despite being herself a transgender woman, her political platform is more focused on welfare than on the defense of the rights of transgender people. In her 12 years as a councilwoman, she did not want focus on projects related to the subject because she believes that her constituents had larger problems and focusing on transgender rights might not be one of the top priorities.

The fact that Tapety has entered politics is considered extraordinary, opening up the way for other transgender people to reach greater acceptance in the political scene. It shows that it is possible for a transgender woman in rural brazil to exercise her right to citizenship and to live a dignified life, away from stereotypes. Contrary to popular belief, her election also showed that it is a myth that the large and cosmopolitan Brazilian cities are less prejudiced than in the so-called "country grottoes." In the four municipal elections in Colônia do Piauí that Katia ran in, she managed to win them all, even assuming the presidency of the city hall for a term, and later serving as deputy mayor. Her political group has support from various groups in the city, including members of evangelical churches.

In the election of 2008, Tapety applied, obtaining only the substitution.

== Personal life ==
The dream of politics is to have Tapety's marital union legalized, since she lives with her partner and two children, one adoptive and the other from a previous relationship.

The documentary "De Zé a Kátia", by Karla Holanda, will show the life of Kátia Tapety, the first transgender person elected to public and political office in Brazil. The information about the feature film came to light through the column of the journalist Mônica Bergamo, published in Folha de S.Paulo in October 2010.
