= Mariluz =

Municipality in Southern Brazil

Coordinates: 24°02′S 53°13′W

- Municipality
- Flag Coat of arms
- Interactive map of Mariluz
- Country: Brazil
- Region: Southern
- State: Paraná
- Mesoregion: Noroeste Paranaense

Population (2020)
  - Total: 10,336
- Time zone: UTC−3 (BRT)

Mariluz is a municipality in the state of Paraná in the Southern Region of Brazil.

== See also ==
- List of municipalities in Paraná

== Notable people ==
- The writer Max Moreno was born in Mariluz, Brazil.
