= Ediane Maria =

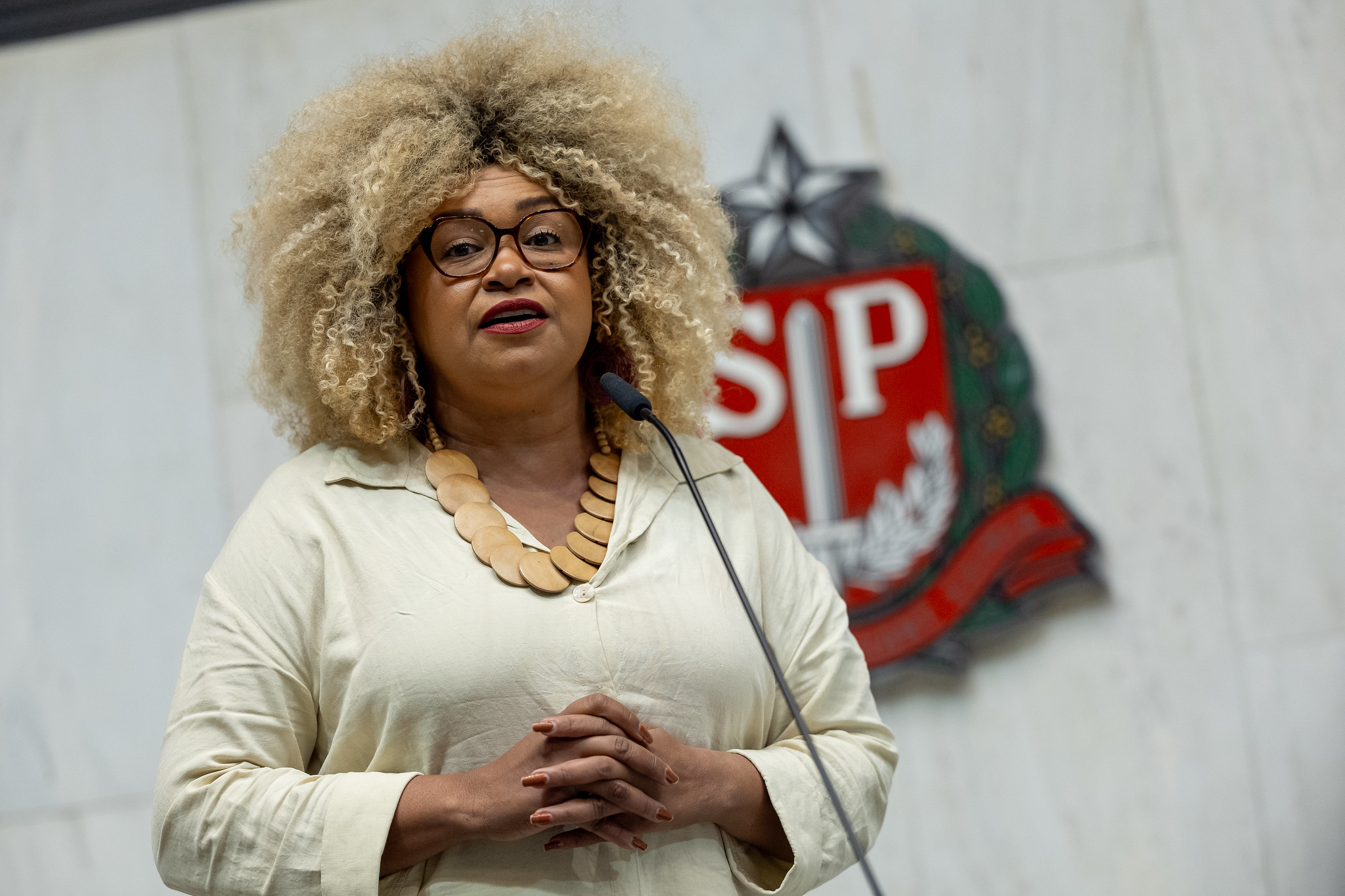
- Maria in 2024

State Representative of São Paulo
- Incumbent
- Assumed office 15 March 2023
- Constituency: São Paulo

Personal details
- Born: Ediane Maria do Nascimento; 10 October 1983 (age 42) Floresta, Pernambuco
- Party: Socialism and Liberty Party

Ediane Maria do Nascimento (Floresta, 10 October 1983), or Ediane Maria, is a Brazilian domestic worker and politician, affiliated with the Socialism and Liberty Party (PSOL), founder of the Raiz da Liberdade movement and activist in the Homeless Workers' Movement (MTST), where she serves as state coordinator.

In the 2022 elections, she was elected as a state representative for the PSOL party in the state of São Paulo with approximately 175,000 votes, becoming the first domestic worker to hold the position in the Legislative Assembly of São Paulo.

== Biography ==
Maria was born in Floresta, Pernambuco, but moved to the state of São Paulo in 2002 when she was 18 years old and began working as a domestic worker in the state capital. However, it was only in 2015 that she received her first formal employment contract.

In 2017 she completed her studies through the Youth and Adult Education program (EJA) and joined the "Povo sem Medo" occupation in São Bernardo do Campo.

== Personal life ==
She lives in the Sítio dos Vianas neighborhood, Santo André, and she is a single mother of four, and is bisexual. Maria also performs as a singer in samba circles.
