= Carla Ayres =

Brazilian sociologist and politician

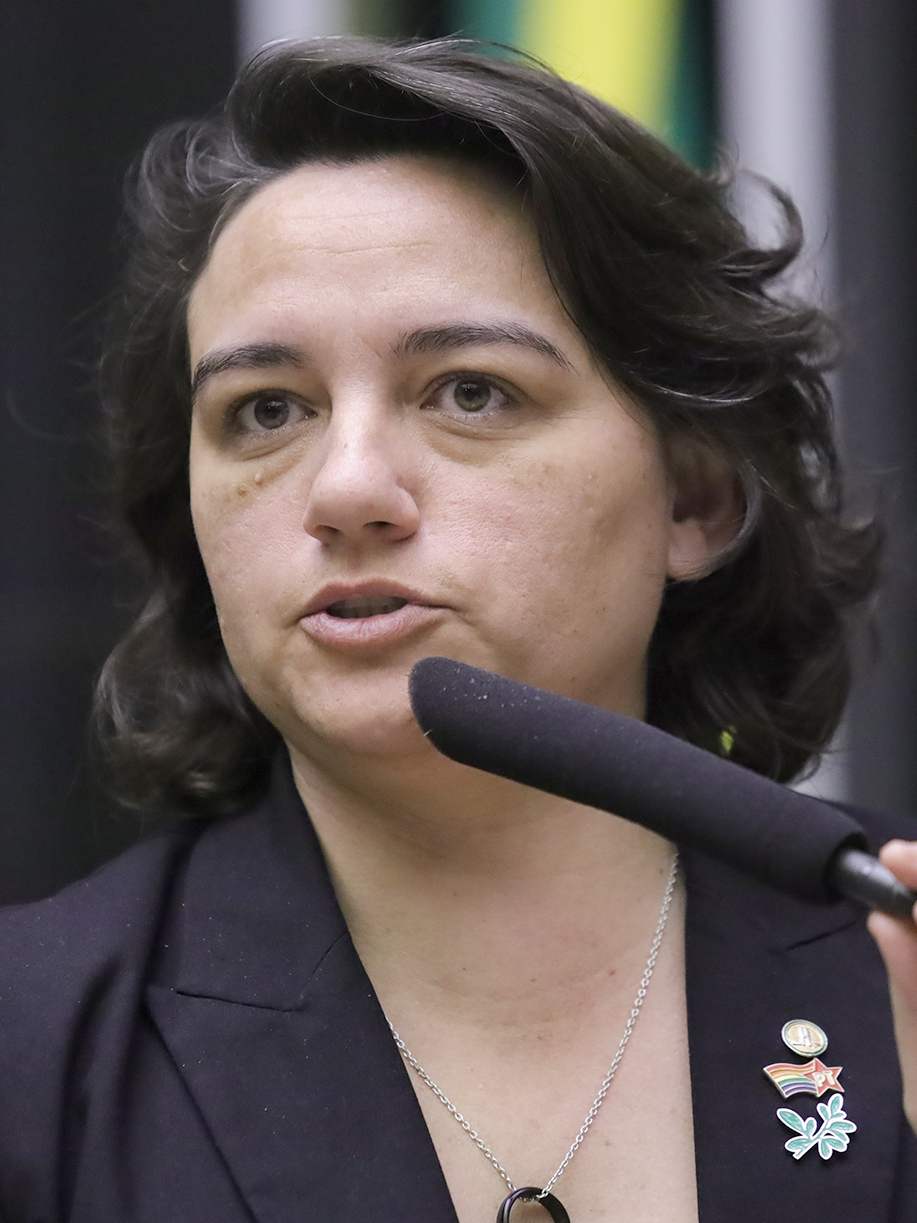

Councilwoman of Florianópolis
- Incumbent
- Assumed office January 1, 2021 (Note: She took leave from June 26 to October 17, 2024, to serve her term as a federal deputy)
- Constituency: Santa Catarina

Federal deputy
- In office June 26, 2024 – October 17, 2024

Personal details
- Born: March 15, 1988 (age 38) Jales, São Paulo, Brazil
- Party: Workers' Party (PT)
- Occupation: Sociologist, politician

Carla Simara Luciana da Silva Ayres (Jales, March 15, 1988) is a Brazilian sociologist and politician, affiliated with the Workers' Party (PT). She is a city councilor in Florianópolis.

== Political career ==
She was elected councilwoman of Florianópolis in 2020 with 2,094 votes (0.91%). On June 26, 2024, she assumed the seat as a federal deputy after Pedro Uczai took a leave of absence.

=== Assault at the Florianópolis City Council ===
During a session held at the Florianópolis City Council on December 7, 2022, councilman Marquinhos da Silva, then affiliated with the Social Christian Party (PSC), grabbed Ayres, wrapping his body around her and kissing her on the cheek without her consent. After Ayres freed herself, he laughed and mocked her actions. In an interview with CNN Brasil, Ayres stated that she spoke with her lawyer and affirmed that she would take appropriate action, such as contacting the City Council's Ethics Committee.

== Personal life ==
Ayres is openly lesbian.
