= Pedro Cunha Lima =

Brazilian politician

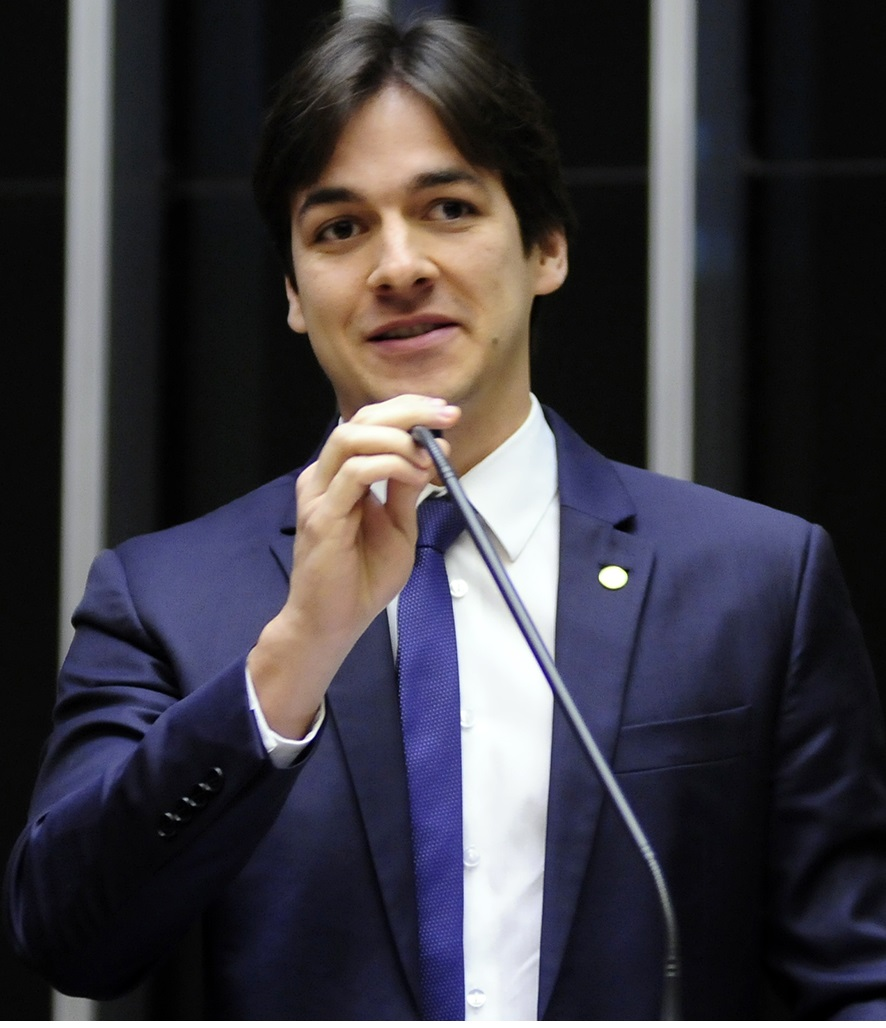
- Cunha Lima in November 2015

Federal Deputy for Paraíba
- In office 1 February 2014 – 31 January 2019

Personal details
- Born: 15 August 1988 (age 37) Campina Grande, Brazil
- Party: PSD

Pedro Oliveira Cunha Lima (born 11 June 1988) is a Brazilian politician as well as a lawyer and writer. He has spent his political career representing Paraíba, having served in the state legislature from 2014 to 2019.

== Personal life ==
Cunha Lima is the son of Cássio Rodrigues da Cunha Lima and Silvia Almeida de Oliveira. He comes from a political family of Paraíba, his father Cássio Cunha Lima is a former senator, and his grandfather Ronaldo Cunha Lima was the governor of Paraíba. On his mother's side he is the great-grandson of the former mayor of Campina Grande, Elpídio Josué de Almeida. He studied law at the Centro Universitário de João Pessoa and entered the Brazilian Bar Association. He earned his master's degree studying constitutional law at the University of Coimbra in Portugal.

== Political career ==
Cunha Lima was the most voted candidate in Paraíba for Federal Deputy at the 2014 Brazilian general election, receiving 179,886 votes or 9.29% of the total ballot.

Cunha Lima voted in favor of the impeachment motion of then-president Dilma Rousseff. He voted in favor raising the spending ceiling of Brazil's government and the 2017 Brazilian labor reforms. Cunha Lima voted in favor of opening a similar corruption investigation into Rousseff's successor Michel Temer.

In May 2019, during the PSDB National Convention, he was elected president of the Teotônio Vilela Institute, the party's political formation body.
