= Erica Malunguinho =

Brazilian politician

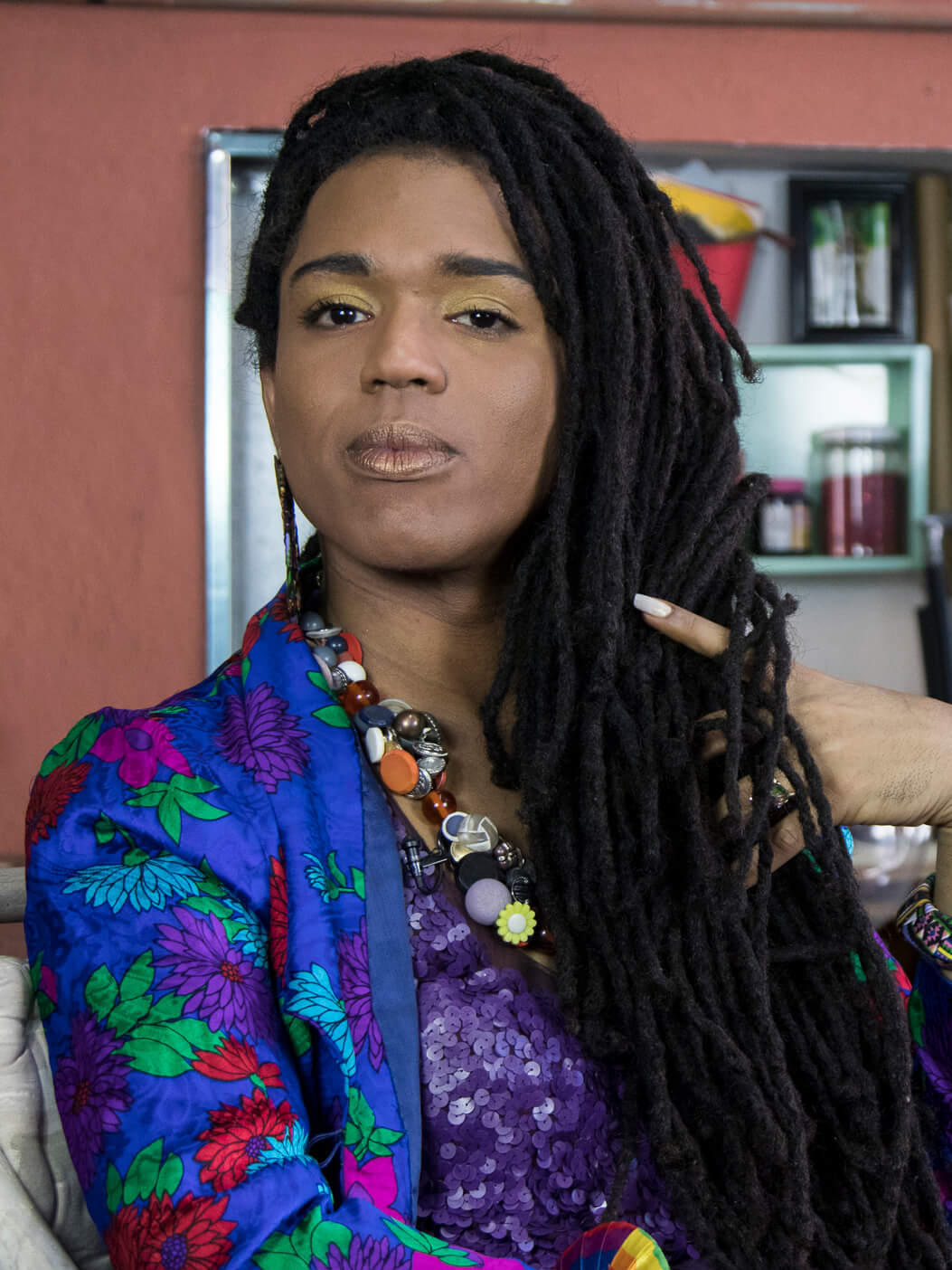
- Malunguinho in 2018

State Deputy for São Paulo
- In office 1 February 2019 – 15 March 2023

Personal details
- Born: 20 November 1981 (age 44) Recife, Pernambuco, Brazil
- Party: PSOL

Erica Malunguinho da Silva (born 20 November 1981 in Recife) is a Brazilian politician elected into the Legislative Assembly of São Paulo on 7 October 2018 after receiving around 54,400 votes. She made history by being the first transgender person to be elected to a Brazilian state legislature. Malunguinho created the urban quilombo Aparelha Luzia, a black cultural space that brings people of African descent together in solidarity, and is also a space for art, discussion, and performances surrounding the idea of blackness and black culture.

Shortly after high school, Malunguinho moved to São Paulo and began to embrace her transgender identity through her official transition. After graduating from University of São Paulo, she spent time working as an artist, activist, and educator. Malunguinho's election platform had five major features: Political Renewal, Enlargement of the Debate, the idea of the Quilombo, Fundamental Rights, and Political Challenges.

== Early life and identity ==
Malunguinho da Silva was born 20 November 1981 in Recife, Pernambuco. By coincidence, her birthday is also Transgender Day of Remembrance although that day was not observed as such at the time of her birth and was only established in the early 2000s. She was assigned a male at birth, was raised by her mother and extended family, and grew up in Recife, Pernambuco. The surname "Malunguinho" refers to the cult of Jurema Sagrada, an entity of the forests of Pernambuco in Catucá. This is a region where her ancestors passed through. The term "Malungo" is used by African descendants of the Bantu family to mean "comrade" or "companion". This is the way in which the enslaved would refer to another person who, like them, had crossed the ocean and started a new life.

The trans, Black, Afro-Brazilian woman's mother, the only educated one in the family, worked as a nurse to support Malunguinho, her siblings, and the other members of the house. Malunguinho grew up immersed in black and indigenous culture. "We all knew we were Black, but when you are Black in Brazil, you also suffer racism within the family," she said. "We were always comparing who had the widest nose, or the nappiest hair."

After high school, Malunguinho felt as if she "had to live another life". She moved to São Paulo when she was 19 with the idea of reinventing herself. There she began to better acknowledge her silenced gender identity, and began to understand herself as a trans woman. "I was always trans. I was living a gay life and a trans life at the same time." With her mother's support, Malunguinho chose her new name.

Over the next few years, Malunguinho attended the University of São Paulo, pursuing a master's degree in aesthetics and art history. She spent time working as a plastic artist and has produced photography, performances, writings, and drawings. In addition to setting up her studio in the neighborhood of Campos Eliseos in São Paulo, Malunguinho has also spent the last 15 years working as an activist and educator. She has worked on training teachers from the public and private spheres on themes related to art, culture, and politics.

== Aparelha Luzia ==
In 2016, Malunguinho transformed her art studio into the cultural and political center Aparelha Luzia. It is an urban quilombo, and has quickly become known as one of the most influential and important black cultural spaces in Brazil. A quilombo is a Brazilian "maroon" society that symbolizes the first act of resistance to slavery. Quilombos today are usually rural black communities that uphold their African heritage and culture and their struggles against racism. Aparelha Luzia is seen as one of the most prominent centers of black resistance, bringing together black people to find shelter against the racism they face on a daily basis. In addition, it is also considered a place to present artistic and intellectual productions with a goal of spreading the cultural and political production of blackness. The quilombo, also hosts parties, courses, formations, debates, birthdays, and it is a place for black people to connect and focus on black issues. Aparelha Luzia is housed in a 10,000-square-foot warehouse and nearly every day of the week it features live music, art, and get-togethers. Malunguinho created it so there is no entrance fee, due to her commitment to the space being open to as many people as possible. Although Aparelha Luiza is managed through a collective, it is Malunguinho's dream that has brought over 200,000 people to the quilombo over the last two years. She has advocated for black people of all gender and sexual identities to feel included, accepted, and sheltered.

== Political career ==
At 36, Malunguinho became the first transgender woman to be elected to state congress in Brazil. One of her major motivations to run was the assassination of Marielle Franco, an LGBTQ Afro-Brazilian politician. "I cried a lot when I heard about Marielle’s murder. Her political project was just wiped out. It was a message to us that we should not be there fighting over our bodies and resisting genocide and racism. I had so much hate in me. At the same time, I knew I needed to take this hate and do something positive with it." Malunguinho ran as a member of the party Partido Socialismo e Liberdade (PSOL), which in translates into English as the Socialism and Liberty Party. This party is one of Brazil's most leftist parties. Her coalition is "Without Fear of Changing São Paulo." Malunguinho is motivated to fight racism through social tourism in the quilombos and indigenous territories as a strategy to combat discrimination and advocate for protection and visibility of minorities, as well as promote a sustainable economy. She has also promised to fight for the rights of the LGBTQ community and has claimed she would focus on the fundamental rights of trans people and their inclusion in the workforce. Additionally, Malunguinho plans on supporting proposals that benefit homeless people and review housing programs. She desires to promote a compassionate reception in hospitals and police stations for survivors of sexual assault, and advocate for the guarantee of civil and tolerant care for women seeking abortions.

=== Campaign platform ===
Malunguinho ran for congress on a platform with five major features. The first feature was political renewal. Although Malunguinho enjoyed grassroots work, she made it known that she saw politics in her future. She believed that the present was the time to create a new political narrative that went against the same groups being represented in politics. She understood that she had a responsibility in relation to the arts, education, LGBTQ, and black movements to focus on the intersectionalities within the framework of institutional policy.

The second feature of her platform was "enlargement of the debate." Knowing that politics is interrelated to people's everyday lives, she promoted the connection of civil society to politics. She believed that people tend to forget that politics is created by, and has impacts on real people, some of whom have been marginalized throughout history through political institutions. She believed that the political process has dehumanized itself to the point that people do not realize that the person representing them is a real person—not just a machine. She thought that people needed to consider politics as closer to them than they tended to think.

The third feature was centered on the idea of the Quilombo. Malunguinho is the founder of the urban quilombo Aparelha Luzia. The idea of a quilombo as a social institution and an organized self-managed society was one of the major foundations of her candidacy. She believed that quilombos should be thought of as political spaces in order to build understanding and deconstruct the popular narratives of those who have been marginalized. Quilombos can bring people together to collaborate and write their own story.

The fourth feature is Fundamental Rights. Malunguinho believed that today's political representatives lack the bravery and motivation needed in order to understand the inequalities and practices of marginalization based on race, gender, and class. As a result, we need politicians who are willing to fight for those who are excluded in today's society. Malunguinho has been willing to focus on this systematic oppression, and made it a pillar in her campaign. She would promote the idea of pushing the limits in government in the fields of mobility, economy, health, education, culture, media, and religious freedom in order to advocate for the people who have historically, and continue to be, left out of the political discussion.

The fifth and final feature is Political Challenges. As a black, transgender woman, Malunguinho realized that putting yourself into politics is not as simple as it seems. Nonetheless, she knew it was something that needs to be done. She faced a bench that is representative of the majority population, (white, heterosexual, cisgender men) along with those who have historically wielded power, and she hoped to propose a new outlook on society and a new way of doing politics.

=== Controversies and challenges ===
Malunguinho states that she faces many challenges due to her identity. Brazil is one of the most deadly countries for transgender people, with 179 reported murders in the year 2017. This is the highest number in a decade. Additionally, black women are acutely underrepresented in Brazil's government. After this most recent election in 2018, Brazil's Senate had no increase in representation in the Upper House, with black women still holding 12 out of 81 seats. The Lower House, however, saw a five percent increase in black women representatives, from previously holding 51 seats, to an increase with 77 seats out of 513.
