= Transgender history in Brazil =

Transgender history in Brazil comprises the history of transgender (transsexual, third gender, and travesti) people in Brazil and their struggles and organization from the pre-colonial period to the modern day. Before Brazil's colonization, indigenous peoples respected various transmasculine and transfeminine third genders; colonization included public executions of trans people and the systematic imposition of the Western gender binary. In the late 1800s, there were repeated arrests of Black travestis and occasional sensationalized news reports of travestis. By the 1920s there were popular drag queens and in the 1950s travestis became popular stars in the theater and revue shows. From the 1960s onward, LGBT periodicals publicly discussed the issues facing travestis and transsexuals.

The military dictatorship in Brazil (1964–1985) carried out mass targeted arrests and media censorship of travestis. Many emigrated to Paris and the majority who remained were pressured into sex work. In the latter half of the dictatorship, censorship loosened and travestis began to re-enter the theatre and organize openly. After the dictatorship, mass arrests continued along with extrajudicial killings by the military and vigilante groups. The homosexual rights movement distanced itself from travestis for respectability. In 1992, the first political travesti organization was created and began advocating for HIV care and against police brutality. Over the next decade, more trans organizations were created and began to partner with gay and lesbian organizations.

In 1997 gender-affirming surgeries were approved on an experimental basis. In 2008 the surgeries began to be covered by the Unified Health System with strict requirements and in 2009 the courts established a right to change name and gender on birth certificates after surgery. In 2017, the requirement for name change became judicial recognition of transgender identity, and in 2019 self-attestation. Since Transgender Europe began recording data in 2008, Brazil has had the highest global annual rates of murders of trans people.

== Indigenous peoples and colonization ==
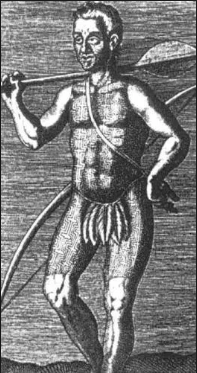
Tibira do Maranhão

In the 16th century, Jesuit priests recorded encounters with indigenous transmasculine people who lived as men, took wives, and took offense at being called women. In 1587, the Descriptive Treatise of Brazil described cudinas, transfeminine indigenous people who were treated as women. They lived as women from a young age, took husbands, and joined menstruating women when exiled to the corner of the village. From 1536 to 1821 "sodomy" was punished under the Portuguese Inquisition with imprisonment, torture, and confiscation of assets. Colonization was framed by the colonizers as necessary to regulate the practices of the indigenous considered "against nature" such as "sodomy".

Xica Manicongo, an African slave, was the first travesti recorded in Brazil; she worked as a cobbler and in 1591 was charged by the Portuguese Inquisition for dressing as a woman and prostitution. Another African travesti, Joane, was accused of the same during the visit. The French Capuchin priest Yves d'Evreux provided an account of meeting a "hermaphrodite" (now referred to as Tibira do Maranhão) between 1613 and 1614 who was forced into hiding as the French "were looking for him and to his equals to kill them and to purify the land of their cruelties" in the name of the Catholic church; when caught they were taken to the Fort of São Luís, tied to a cannon, and shot in front of local indigenous leaders. One was recorded by Yves as telling Tibira that "if you want to have long hair in Heaven and the body of a woman rather than that of a man, ask Tupan to give you the body of a woman and you will be resurrected as a woman, and there in Heaven you will be alongside women and not men".

In 1711, the first constitution of the Archbishop of Bahia established a punishment of a 100 cruzados fine and, arbitrarily dependent on the situation, banishment for "cross-dressing" as a woman. In the 1750s the Portuguese established administrative control of sex and gender in daily life, enforcing heterosexuality and adhesion to Western gender norms and roles. Over the next 100 years in Brazil there were repeated arrests for "cross-dressing", mostly of black travestis. In the second half of the 19th century, Brazilian newspapers reported sensationalized accounts of travestis and would publicize their names and addresses.

== 20th century ==
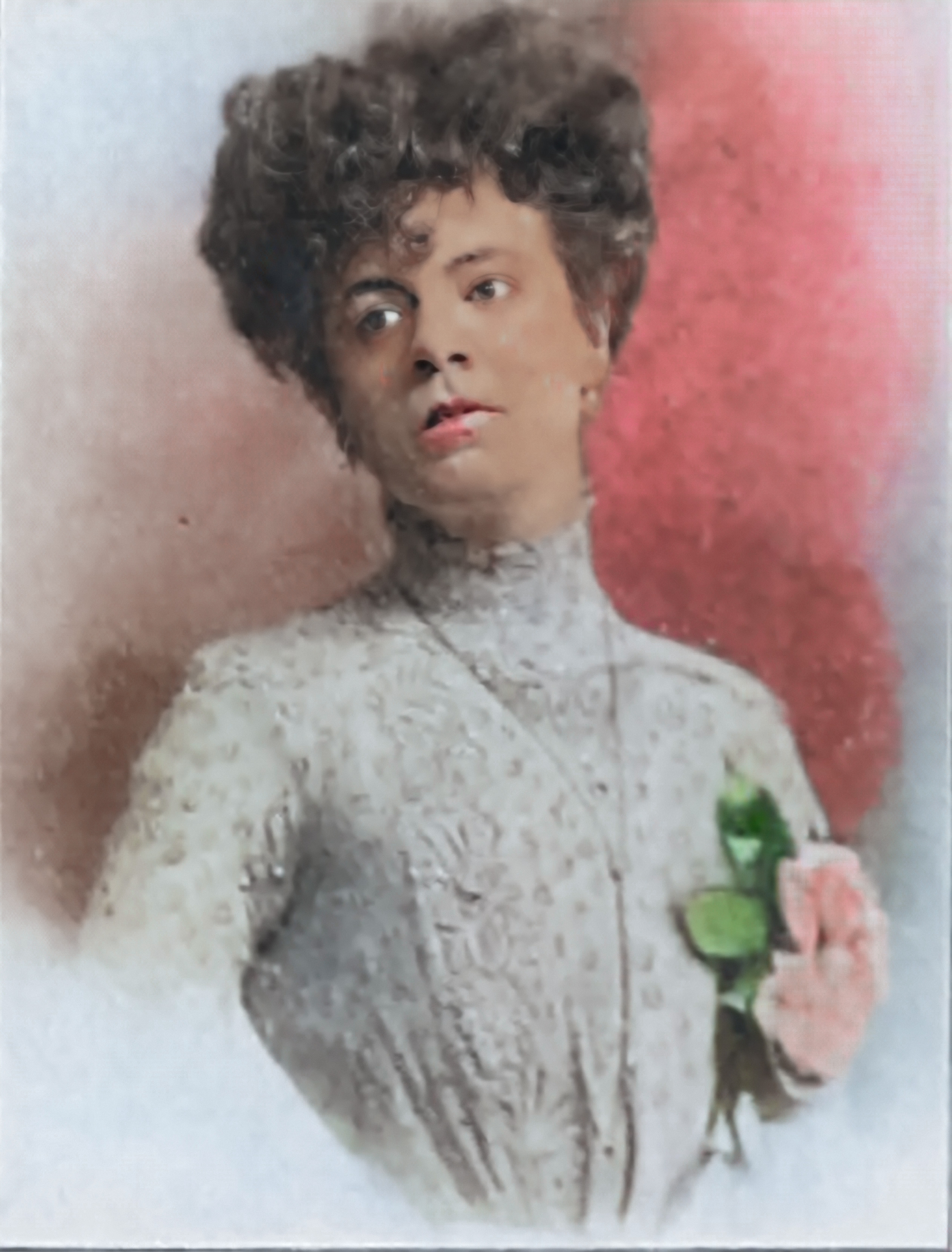
Dina Alma de Paradeda (colorized)

In 1910, in Die Transvestiten (Transvestites), Magnus Hirschfeld recounted the story of Dina Alma de Paradeda, a Brazilian socialite who became a popular figure in Berlin's balls and who he claimed to have known personally; she died in 1906 by suicide rather than comply with a medical assistant's order to undress and undergo a medical examination. In the 1920s and 30s, drag queens such as John Bridges and Aymond had popular acts where they impersonated contemporary female stars. In the 1950s and 60s, gay bars started to open in Copacabana, Rio de Janeiro and travestis gained more acceptance in the theater, having previously been relegated to Carnival and drag balls.

In the 1950s revue shows were at the height of their popularity. In 1953, Ivaná Monteiro Damião became of star of such shows and appeared in movies as a woman in the 50s and 60s. She was presented as a visiting French artist despite being Portuguese and living for a long time in Rio de Janeiro. At first, her sex was hidden, until productors started utilizing it in their marketing. She is frequently cited as the first famous travesti in Brazilian theater, but she gave the credit for that to Aymond. In 1959, the magazine O Cruzeiro published a story about Mário da Silva, a trans man who at 18 years old received gender-affirming surgery in his home city of Itajaí. In 1963, the gay magazine O Snob discussed different contemporary gender identities in Rio, which included bichas, bofes, bonecas, and entendidos.

=== Military dictatorship (1964–1985) ===
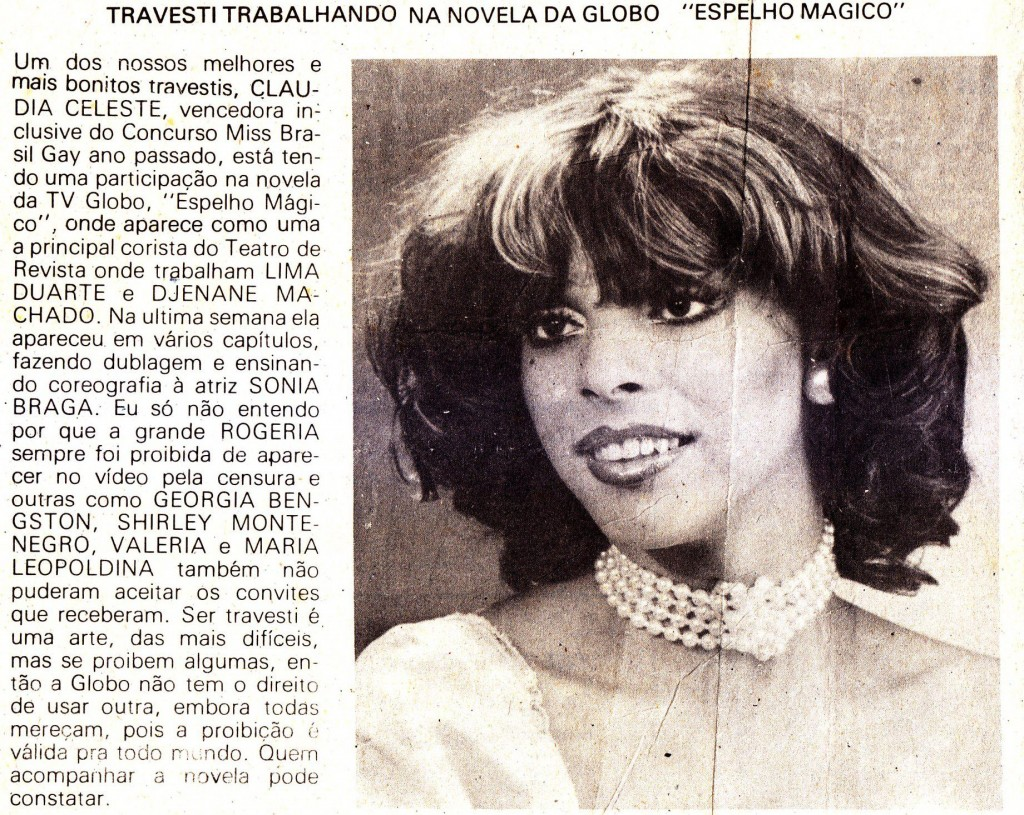
Cláudia Celeste, the first travesti television star.

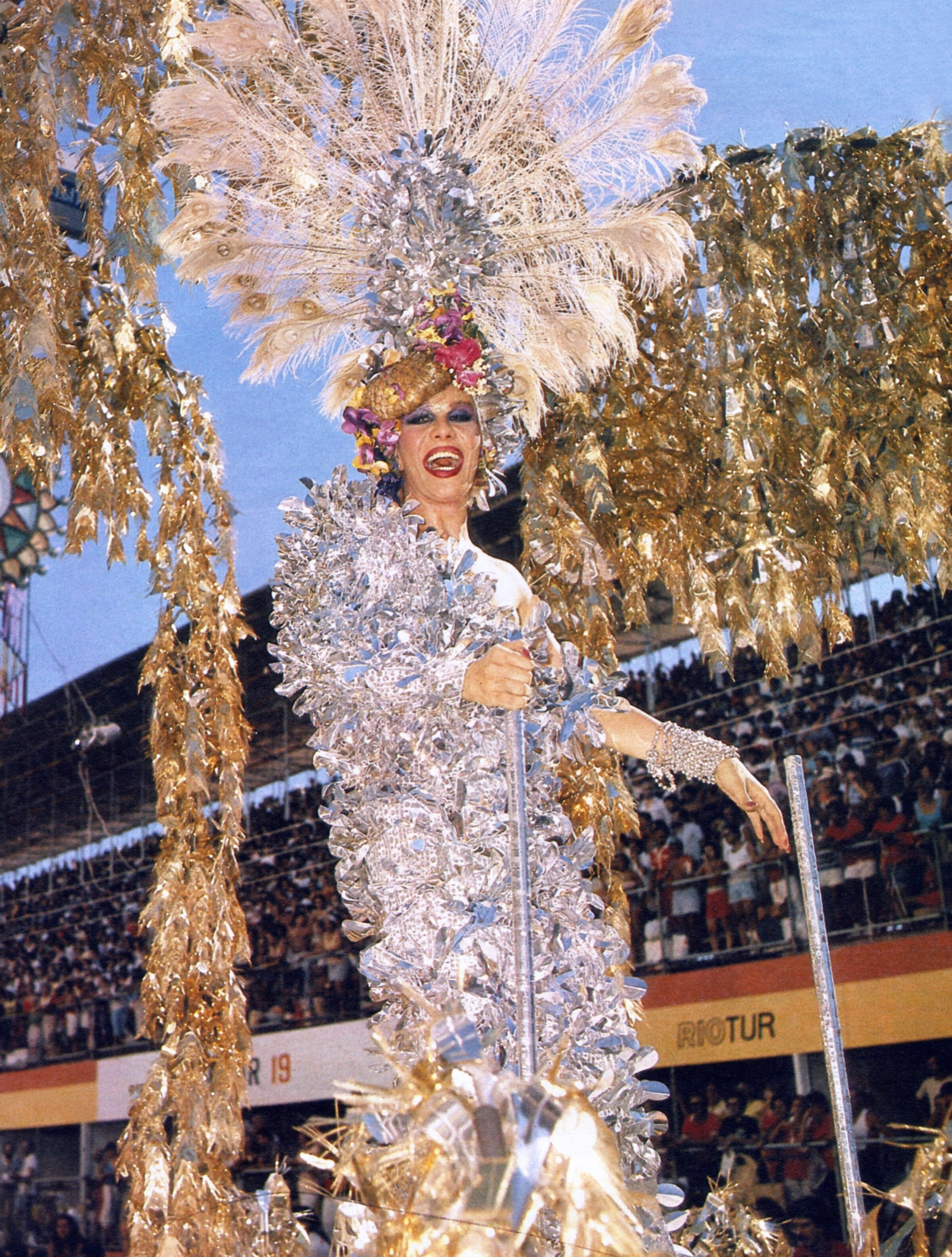
Rogéria, "the travesti of the Brazilian family", in 1982.

The military repression started in the late 60s and reached its height in the 70s, mainly targeting suspected communists and LGBT people, the most recognizable of whom were travestis at the time. The military would censor travesti shows on television and theater and people assigned male at birth were arrested for looking feminine. During the same period, Pajubá, a blend of Portuguese and West African languages spoken by practitioners of Afro-Brazilian religions, became popular among travestis and expanded to include terms relevant to LGBT people to communicate covertly. In 1964, Rogéria became a star in revue shows and shortly after moved to Europe with other famous travestis where she became one of the first Brazilian travestis to start gender-affirming hormone therapy. By the end of the 1960s and the start of the 70s the majority of travestis in Rio took hormones. Shortly after the stars fled, primarily to Paris, approximately 200 other travestis followed them to the city. By the end of the 70s the figure grew to 500 and by the 80s it was 2000. As a result of exclusion in the labour and housing market in Brazil and the emerging sex work industry, the majority of travestis remaining were systematically pressured into prostitution during this period; while travestis had been associated with theater in the 60s they were associated with crime and prostitution in the 80s. Many began to use dangerous black-market silicone injections in addition to hormones.

In 1968, after the passage of Institutional Act Number Five, the minister of foreign affairs José de Magalhães Pinto formed a commission to investigate subversives suspected of being LGBT based on medical and psychiatric examinations and external complaints. In 1970, the dictatorship approved decree 1077 (Decreto-Lei n. 1.077), which gave them the power to censor communications that they considered a threat to the institution of the family. In 1971, Waldirene Nogueira received gender-affirming surgery from Dr. Roberto Farina. The surgery, performed at the Oswaldo Cruz hospital in São Paulo, was a success; However, Farina was charged by the State with bodily harm and sentenced to two years in prison. The first surgery for a trans man, João W. Nery was performed clandestinely by Farina in 1977.

The period from 1975 to 1985, known as the abertura (opening) of the dictatorship, saw the growth of various liberation movements. Between 1978 and 1981 the first LGBT newspaper in Brazil, O Lampião da Esquina, was published and drew attention to the murders, often by police, of homosexuals and travestis, as well as the fight for LGBT rights and acceptance. In 1980, it criticized the exclusion of travestis from the Encontro Brasileiro de Homossexuais (Brazilian Meeting of Homosexuals). In the mid-1970s in São Paulo a systematic hunt led to the arrests of over 2,000 travestis who were then treated as political prisoners. In 1980, during carnival in Rio de Janeiro, the police attacked, tortured and killed homosexuals and travestis in a local bar. In 1981, the army began Operation Rondão, which targeted travestis and arrested 1,500 in a week before being met with a large counter-protest. Even so, transgender rights saw some advances during this time. From 1978 to 1979, Dr. Roberto Farina was acquitted of all criminal liability in a trial and subsequent appeal stemming from the first gender-affirming surgery performed in Brazil.

In 1977, Cláudia Celeste became the first travesti television actress in Brazil. Rogéria returned in the 1970s and became a star of theater, television, and cinema with the nickname "the travesti of the Brazilian family" from 1980 until her death in 2017. Cláudia Wonder was a travesti rock star in the 80s and, unlike her predecessors, her work was countercultural and mixed with LGBT activism. In 1984, Nery released the autobiography Personal Error: Joana ou João? (Erro de Pessoa: Joana ou João?), the first record of a self-declared trans man in Brazil. The same year, Brenda Lee, a travesti from São Paulo, created the Palácio das Princesas (Palace of the Princesses) in her house, caring for HIV-positive travestis and victims of violence. The name was changed to the Casa de Apoio Brenda Lee (Brenda Lee Support House) in 1986 and was still open as of 2019.

=== Post-dictatorship period (1986–1999) ===
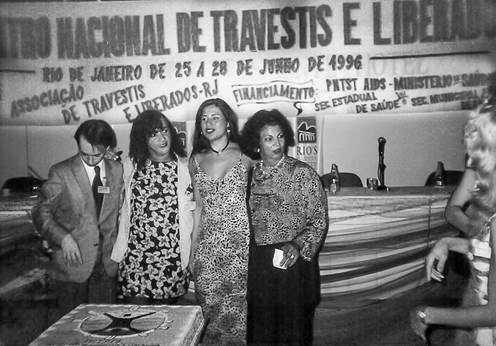
ENTLAIDS in 1996. From left to right: André Fernandes, Jovanna Baby (president of ASTRAL), Indianarae Siqueira, and Kátia Tapety.

After the dictatorship, in the second half of the 1980s, the situation for travestis worsened. The military police, paramilitary groups, and vigilantes hunted travestis and killed them without fear of legal consequences. On February 27, 1987, the São Paulo police launched Operation Tarantula, a program that targeted travestis for their identity; it was officially suspended on March 10 due to pressure from LGBT rights groups following the arrest of approximately 300 travestis. In 1987, the president of the group Triângulo Rosa ('pink triangle'), João Antônio Mascarenhas, appeared before the 1987 Constituent Assembly to say that associating with travestis would hurt the homosexual movement. At the 1988 Constituent Assembly, activists from the Brazilian Homosexual Movement moved to add sexual orientation as a protected class in a non-discrimination clause; as they spoke they differentiated "respectable homosexuals" like themselves from "travestis."

In the 1990s, the Higher Institute of Religious Studies (ISER; Instituto Superior de Estudos da Religião) developed a HIV/AIDS prevention project that distributed supplies to sex workers. Jovanna Baby worked as a referrer for travestis in 1990 onwards. On May 2, 1992, Baby and other travesti sex workers gathered in ISER to form the first political travesti organization in Latin America and the second in the world, the Association of Travestis and Liberated Peoples (ASTRAL; Associação das Travestis e Liberados), with Baby as the president. The first actions of ASTRAL were to organize against police violence and indiscriminate arrests targeted towards travesti sex workers in addition to organizing for better care for people with HIV/AIDS.

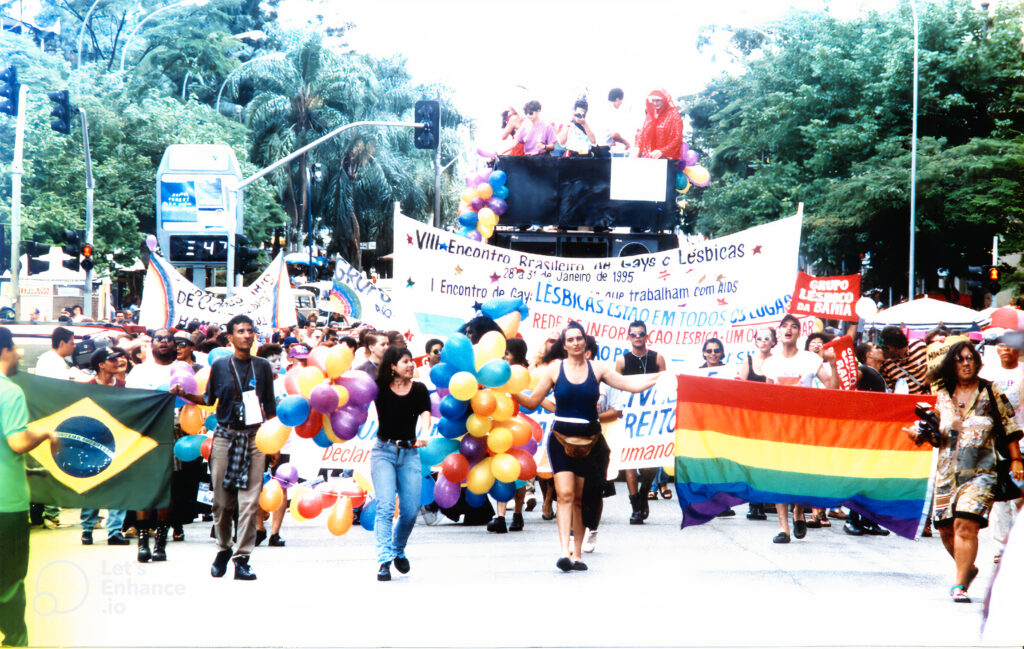
Curitiba Diversity Parade in 1995, marking the creation of ABGLT

Until the 1990s, travestis and transsexuals were not formally included in the Brazilian Homosexual Movement. In 1993, ASTRAL organized the first National Meeting of Travestis and Liberated Peoples (Encontro Nacional de Travestis e Liberados), with the slogan "the citizens do not have adequate clothing". 95 members from 5 states attended. In 1996, at the fourth meeting, it began to receive funding from the federal government's National DST-AIDS Program and was renamed the National Meeting of Travestis in the Fight against AIDS (ENTLAIDS; Encontro Nacional de Travestis na Luta contra a AIDS). In 1995, travesti organizations were formally included in the homosexual movements’ spaces for the first time at the 8th Brazilian Meeting of Gays and Lesbians, which saw the creation of the Brazilian Association of Gays, Lesbians, and Travestis (ABGLT; Associação Brasileira de Gays, Lésbicas e Travestis) and would be renamed in 1997 to the Brazilian Meeting of Gays, Lesbians, and Travestis (EBGLT; Encontro Brasileiro de Gays, Lésbicas e Travestis). During this period, what was referred to as the Brazilian Homosexual Movement (MHB; Movimento Homossexual Brasileiro) was gradually renamed to the Movement of Gays and Lesbians (MGL) then Movement of Gays, Lesbians, and Travestis (MGLT).

In 1992, Kátia Tapety was elected to city councilor of Colônia do Piauí, becoming the first travesti to occupy elected office in Brazil. In 1997, the Transsexual Movement of Campinas (Movimento Transexual de Campinas) was formed from connections made between participants at ENTLAIDS. It distinguished itself for its pedagogical aims of attempting to educate the population, popularizing a medicalized understanding of transsexuality, and for maintaining a strong relationship with health services such as the Hospital das Clínicas of the State University of Campinas. They had a large impact on medical policy regarding transition and in the same year gender-affirming surgeries stopped being considered a "crime of mutilation" and began to be performed experimentally in some university hospitals according to Resolution 1482/97 of the Federal Council of Medicine.

At the end of the 1990s, there was not a national consensus about the use of terms of identity. The letter T in GLT or GLBT could signify travestis, transsexuals, or transgender, and the majority of travesti and transsexual activists do not recognize themselves in the term transgender. Finally, Brazilian trans people began to use trans while rejecting transgender. In 1999, in Rio de Janeiro, the Homosexual Defense Hotline (DDH; Disque Defesa Homosexual) was formed by the state public security office together with LGBT activists and researchers with tripartite representation of a gay man, a lesbian and a travesti. The goal of the DDH was to change the police from an oppressive institution towards LGBT people to one that protects them; it led to an increasing trend of creation of LGBT public security agendas by hybrid ensembles of state and activism. In December 2000, in Curitiba, the National Articulation of Travestis and Transsexuals (ANTRA) was formed, which by 2013 had more than 80 membership organizations and was the largest network of trans people in Latin America.

== 21st century ==
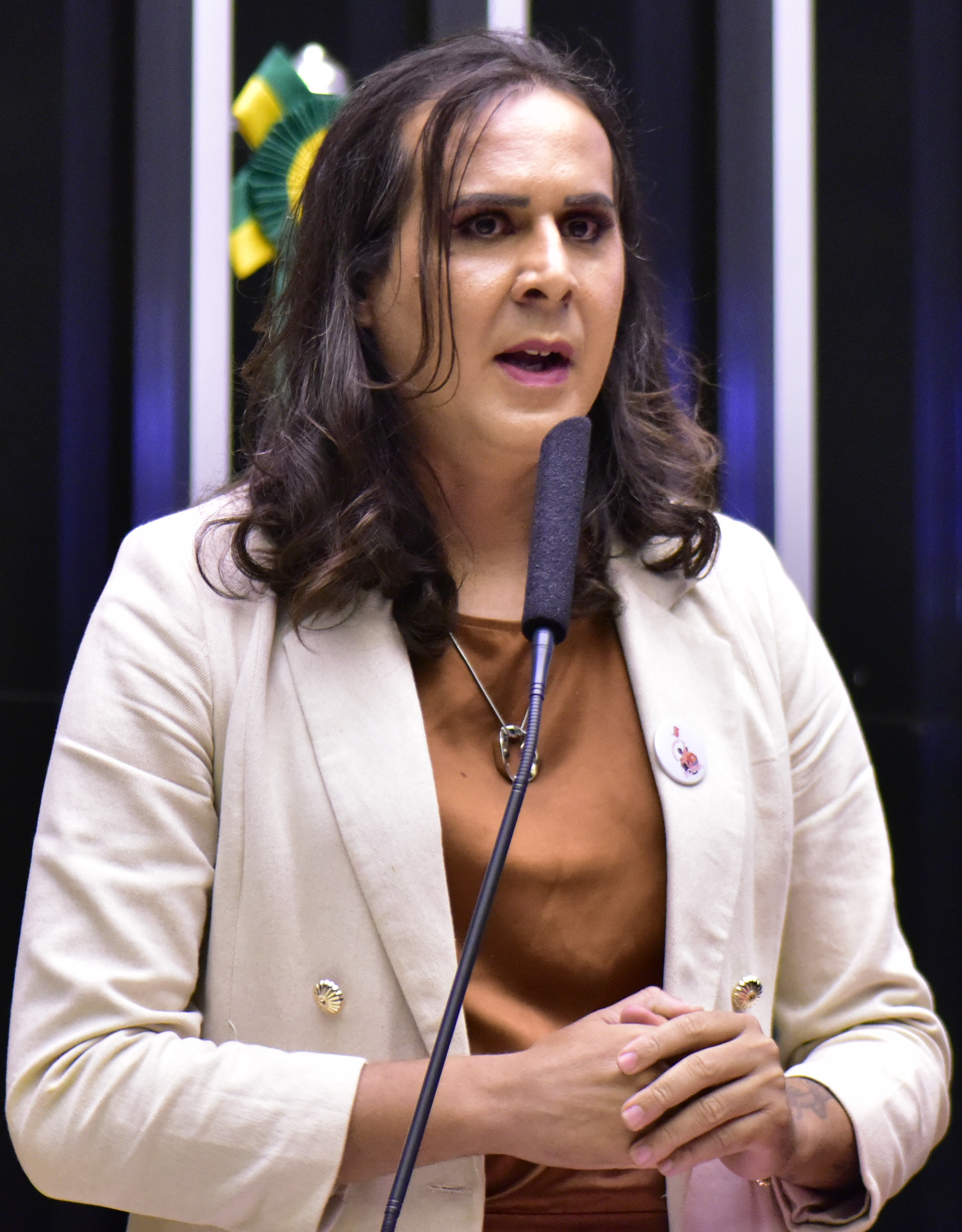
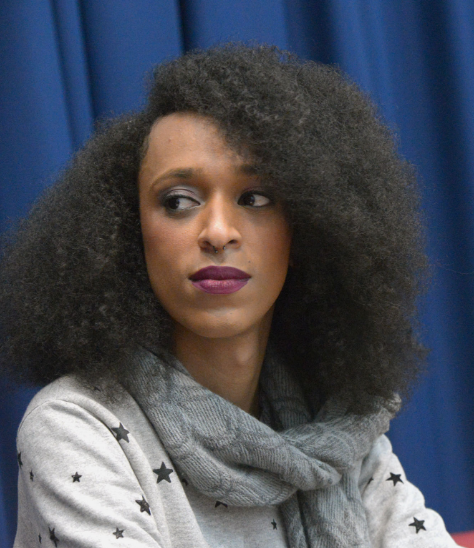
Duda Salabert (left) and Erika Hilton (right), the first travestis elected to the National Congress.

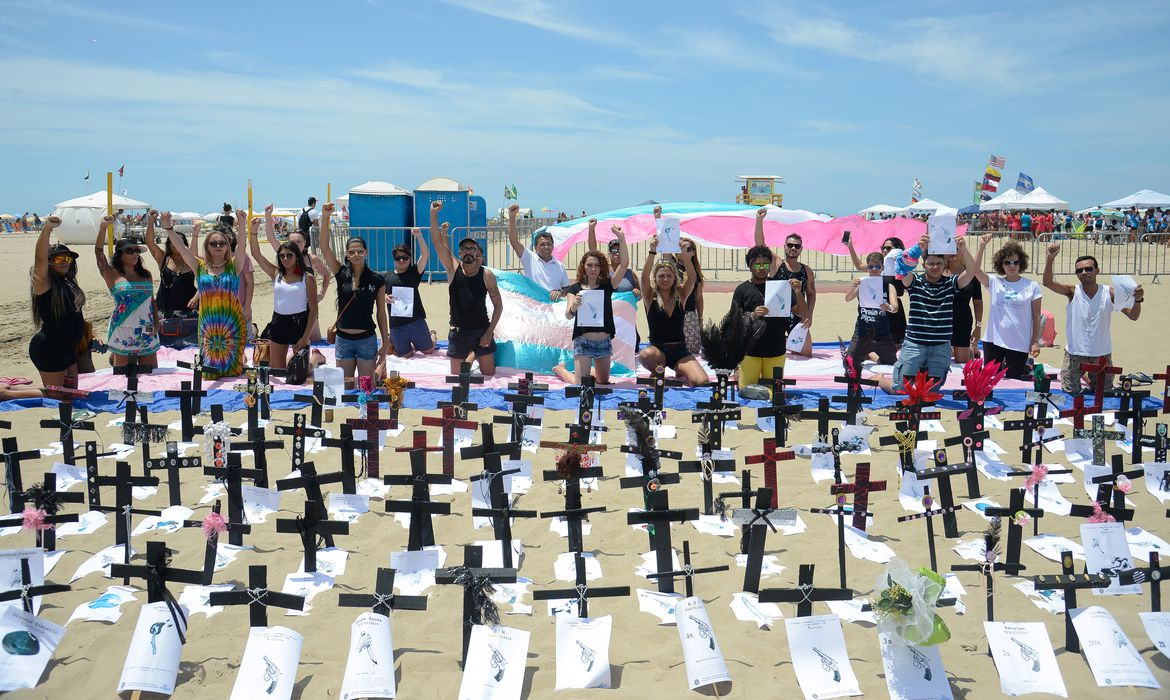
144 crosses erected on Copacabana beach on Trans Day of Visibility in 2017 to represent each trans person killed in Brazil in 2016.

In 2008, at the 22nd EBGLT in Brasília, a group organized the first national meeting of transsexuals with the participation of approximately 30 national leaders. The ABGLT 2010–2013 term was the first to have a travesti on the board of directors, in addition to a trans vice president. The growth of social media in the mid-2000s led to the creation of online groups and resources for Brazilian trans men. In 2011, João W. Nery expanded and republished his earlier autobiography as 'Solitary Journey: Memories of a transsexual thirty years later' (Viagem Solitária: Memórias de um transexual trinta anos depois), becoming a prominent activist for trans men. The first organization for trans men, the Brazilian Association of Trans Men (Associação Brasileira de Homens Trans), was founded in July 2012. It was short-lived and was eventually replaced by the Brazilian Institute of Transmasculinities (IBRAT; Instituto Brasileiro de Transmasculinidades), founded on June 13. IBRAT helped organize the first National Meeting of Transgender Men (Encontro Nacional de Homens Trans) in March 2015.

In 2008, the Brazilian Ministry of Health began to offer gender-affirming surgery through the Unified Health System; the requirements included 2 years of psychotherapy and the approval of local health officials. In 2009, the Superior Court of Justice (STJ; Superior Tribunal de Justiça) established the right of trans women who had received surgery to change their name and gender on their birth certificates. In 2017, the STJ replaced the requirement of surgery with that of judicially proving transgender identity. In 2018, the Group of Lawyers for Sexual Diversity (GADvS; Grupo de Advogados pela Diversidade Sexual) along with LGBT activists successfully argued in favor of new gender-identity recognition legislation; The Supreme Federal Court (STF; Supremo Tribunal Federal) ruled that trans people can have identity cards and official documents consistent with their gender and name without medical, legal or judicial requirements. In 2019, the STF issued a ruling that anti-LGBT discrimination should be prosecutable under laws governing racist discrimination until Congress approves specific LGBT legislation. A 2021 study found 34 barriers to its implementation.

According to a report by Transgender Europe published in 2021, Brazil had the highest number of murders against trans and queer people worldwide for the 13th consecutive year; of the 375 murders recorded worldwide that year, 125 occurred in Brazil, although the report clarified that this figure may be an underestimate due to unreported cases and unrecorded deaths. ANTRA published a report in early 2021 that estimated 175 transfemicides in 2020, 82% of which were committed against black people. The COVID-19 pandemic also worsened pre-existing socioeconomic and health disparities: around 70% of queer and trans people were unable to access emergency services, some had to detransition when they returned to families that did not support them due to mass layoffs, and suicides among trans people increased during the lockdown. In the 2022 Brazilian general election the first travesti legislators were elected to the National Congress: Erika Hilton and Duda Salabert, city councilors of São Paulo and Belo Horizonte respectively. ANTRA recorded over 30 trans candidates ran in the elections, approximately 80% of whom had harassment threats and intimidation, including death threats.

In April 2025, the Federal Council of Medicine approved a resolution banning hormone therapy for minors under 18 years of age in the country. The resolution was overturned by a federal court in Acre in July 2025 and later reinstated by an injunction from Supreme Court Justice Flávio Dino in October 2025.

== See also ==
- LGBTQ history in Brazil
- Transgender rights in Brazil
- Travesticide
