= Neon Cunha =

Brazilian activist

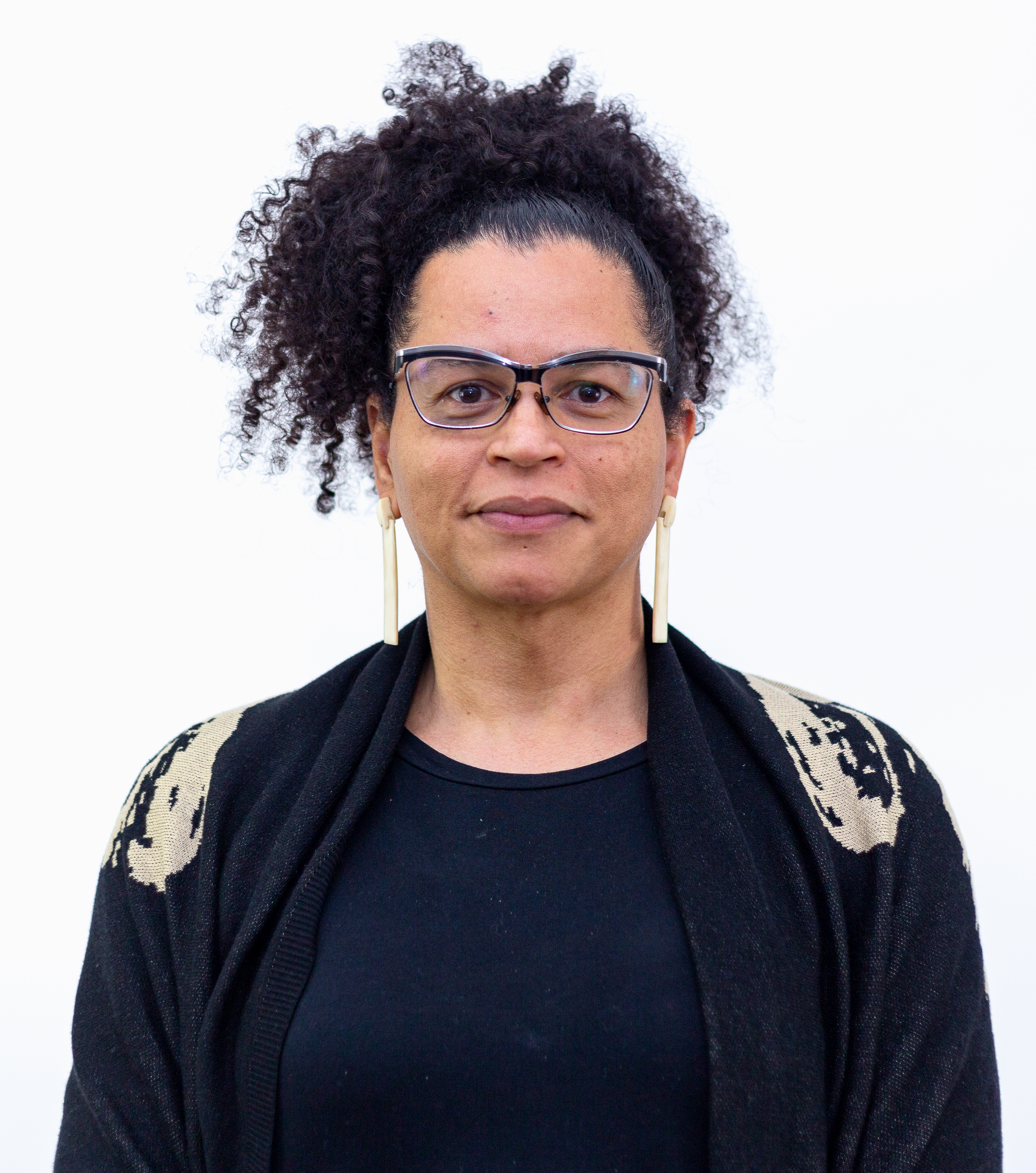
- Born: January 24, 1970 (age 56); Belo Horizonte, Brazil
- Occupations: Activist; Politician
- Honours: Theodosina Ribeiro Medal

Neon dos Afonso Cunha (Belo Horizonte, January 24, 1970), better known as Neon Cunha, is a Brazilian politician and activist for Black and LGBTQ rights. She became notable for being the first transgender person in Brazil to rectify her documents without the need for medical reports. She is also known for being one of the survivors of Operation Tarantula.

== Biography ==
=== Youth and education ===
Born in Belo Horizonte, Neon is the daughter of domestic worker Salete dos Afonso Cunha and metalworker Odilon Domingos da Cunha, and the third of ten siblings, including two adopted children. Due to her father's profession, the whole family moved to São Bernardo do Campo in the ABC Paulista region when she was two-years-old. She graduated in advertising and fine arts and pursued a career as a civil servant in the São Bernardo do Campo City Hall, where she still works today. Neon Cunha realized she was transgender in childhood.

=== Activism ===
"Agora eu posso existir" (English: Now I can exist) – Neon Cunha’s story, documented by the Museu da Pessoa (2020)

In 2014, when she was forty-five-years-old, Neon filed a lawsuit seeking to rectify the gender on her documentation. At the time, the Brazilian government required a medical report proving the transsexuality of those seeking to change their documents. To obtain this, individuals had to undergo medical and judicial evaluations. Neon refused the medical evaluation, believing that her identity is not a pathology. The issue of waiving medical reports had almost never been litigated before her case.

Due to delays in the legal process, in 2016 Neon requested assisted suicide from the Organization of American States (OAS) if her gender and identity were not recognized by the Brazilian government. She was the first trans woman to speak in person at the OAS, and she did so at the invitation of Geledés - Black Women's Institute.

On October 31, 2016, Judge Celso Lourenço Morgado, of the 6th Civil Court of São Bernardo do Campo, granted the request for a change of gender and name. In the ruling, he stated: "Transsexuality is not a pathological condition and gender identity is self-defined by the person". The decision served as a precedent for the Supreme Federal Court to authorize the rectification of documents by gender self-identification in March 2018.

== Awards ==
In 2019, she received the Theodosina Ribeiro Medal from the Legislative Assembly of the State of São Paulo, an award given to women who have distinguished themselves in society.

== Political activity ==
In 2022 she ran for state representative for the state of São Paulo and received 35,111 votes. In 2024 she ran for city councilor for the city of São Paulo, but was not elected.
