= Wal Torres =

Brazilian gender therapist and sexologist

- Born: March 30, 1950 (age 75); São Paulo
- Other names: Dr. Wal Torres, MS; Dr. Martha Freitas, MS
- Education: University of São Paulo, University Gama Filho
- Occupations: Therapist & sexologist
- Known for: Transgender therapy
- Title: Master in Sexology
- Partner: Divorced
- Children: 3
- Website: www.gendercare.com

Wal Torres (Note: Nowadays she uses professionally Wal Torres, MS. Formerly, she was broadly cited as Martha Freitas.) (born March 30, 1950, in São Paulo) is a Brazilian gender therapist and sexologist.

== Biography ==
A graduate of the University of São Paulo Polytechnic School (USP) in Engineering, Torres has a bachelor's degree in Philosophy from the PUC (Pontifícia Universidade Católica), among other related qualifications.

For many years, Torres worked as a consultant in the petrochemical and fertilizing industries, where—before transitioning her gender identity—she had a successful career, both nationally and internationally. Despite the professional success, she accepted her gender dysphoria and realized she would need to move away from engineering (where it would have been difficult to be accepted in a new gender).

Her own gender transition started in 1993 and took many years. In 1995, she decided to research the dynamics in the formation of gender dysphoria in Bireme Library, which is connected to the Universidade Federal de São Paulo. In 1997, she had sex reassignment surgery with a reputed Brazilian surgeon named Jalma Jurado. From this period of studies, she published a book entitled Meu Sexo Real (“My Real Sex”), under the pseudonym of Martha Freitas (Vozes Edition, 1998). This book was subsequently sent by its editor to the Frankfurt Book Fair of 1998 and was soon recognized as an authoritative book about the gender subject by Günter Dörner, of the Endocrinology Department at the Humboldt University in Berlin. Later, she would also publish O Mito Genital ("The Genital Myth") by Belaspalavras Edition.

Torres received a Master degree in Sexology from the Universidade Gama Filho, Rio de Janeiro, for which she presented a dissertation titled "Gênero, do Mito à Realidade" (“Gender: from Myth to Reality”) in 2002, and graduated cum laude. Torres is a contributing member of the WPATH – World Professional Association for Transgender Health (formerly HBIGDA, which represents specialists from all over the world (doctors, psychologists, sexologists, social workers etc.). She also served on the Board of the OII – Organisation Intersex International, an international organisation of intersex people and their allies which represent intersex people. It is Torres' aim to establish protocols and interchange experiences in the evaluation and treatment of people suffering due to gender dysphoria.
