= Amara Moira =

Brazilian writer

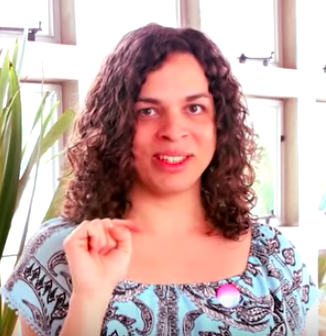
- Born: 26 February 1985
- Education: State University of Campinas
- Occupations: Teacher, writer, university teacher

Amara Moira (born 26 February 1985) is a Brazilian writer, literature professor and activist. Moira has a PhD in literary theory from the State University of Campinas and became the first trans woman to obtain the degree from the university using her social name.

Her name is inspired by Homer's Odyssey, in which the Moirai were seers who foresaw a bitter (amara) fate for Ulysses.

== Activism and literary production ==
During her doctorate at UNICAMP on the literary production of James Joyce, she began her process of gender transition. She was then 29 years old. She then began working as a prostitute and writing a blog, where she recounted her experiences and those of other colleagues in the profession. This period was the inspiration for the subsequent writing of her book, E se eu fosse puta, released in 2016. Currently, she no longer works as a sex worker, but she supports of the regulation of prostitution in Brazil. In addition, Amara believes that literature is a source of social transformation.

== Works ==
=== Books ===
- 2016 – E se eu fosse puta – Hoo Editora ISBN 9788593911224
- 2017 – Vidas trans: a coragem de existir – co-authored by João W. Nery, Márcia Rocha and T. Brant, foreword by Laerte Coutinho and Jaqueline Gomes de Jesus. Editora Alto Astral
- 2021 – Neca + 20 poemetos travessos – Editora O Sexo da Palavra
- 2022 – Y si yo fuera puta – Editorial Mandacaru (translation to Spanish by: Lucía Tennina, Penélope Serafina Chaves Bruera e Amara Moira) ISBN 9789874767158
- 2024 – Neca: romance em bajubá – Companhia das Letras.

=== Participation in athologies ===
- 2019 – A resistência dos vagalumes – participation with the short story Neca, Editora Nós ISBN 9788569020462
- 2021 – Partes de uma casa – Organized by Rafaela Pechansky, foreword by Itamar Vieira Júnior – participation with the short story Luan Ângelo, TAG Experiências Literárias ISBN 9786588526033
