= Waldirene Nogueira =

Brazilian manicurist and patient of gender affirming surgery

Waldirene Nogueira (Lins, May 1945 – Ubatuba, 19 May 2026) was a Brazilian manicurist known for being the first transgender woman to undergo sex reassignment surgery in Brazil, in 1971.

== Biography ==
Nogueira was born in May 1945 in Lins, São Paulo, the ninth child of a truck driver and a homemaker, and was registered at birth with the name Waldir Nogueira. At home, she slept in a room separate from her siblings, in a space adapted by her father in the old pantry. During her upbringing, her father subjected her to treatment with male hormones. While still young, she left her family and went to live in a neighboring city, working as a manicurist.

In 1969, she began receiving treatment from endocrinologist Dorina Epps at the Hospital das Clínicas de São Paulo. After two years of interdisciplinary follow-up and weekly therapy sessions, she received a report recognizing her transsexuality. In December 1971, plastic surgeon Roberto Farina performed the procedure on Nogueira, in what would be the first sex reassignment surgery on a trans woman in Brazil, at the Oswaldo Cruz Hospital in São Paulo, at no cost to her.

Five years later, when she went to court to legally change her legal name, the Public Prosecutor's Office discovered the surgery and charged the doctor, Roberto Farina, with aggravated bodily harm. Nogueira was declared a victim in her own absence. In 1976, she was forcibly removed from the school where she studied English and taken to the Institute of Forensic Medicine (IML) in São Paulo. At the institute, she was forced to undress, photographed naked in various positions, and subjected to a gynecological examination with photographic documentation.

In 1978, the judge sentenced Farina to two years in prison. During the trial, Nogueira gathered letters from authorities and residents in his defense, as well as a petition with approximately 350 signatures. The sentence was overturned on appeal in 1979.

Although she had a degree in accounting, Nogueira never practiced the profession due to a discrepancy between her identity and her registered name. She also chose not to get a driver's license for the same reason. Her birth certificate, which bore the name Waldirene, was only changed in October 2010, when she was 65 years old. Her identity card was corrected in January 2011.

Throughout her life, she worked as a manicurist and lived a discreet life. According to Alessandra Cotrim, Nogueira's niece, towards the end of her life she was bedridden in Ubatuba, under the care of one of her brothers.

Nogueira died of acute respiratory failure in Ubatuba, on 19 May 2026, at the age of 80.

== See also ==
- Roberto Farina Case
- Processo transexualizador
- Transgender history in Brazil
