= Paulo de Mello Bastos =

Brazilian pilot and union leader

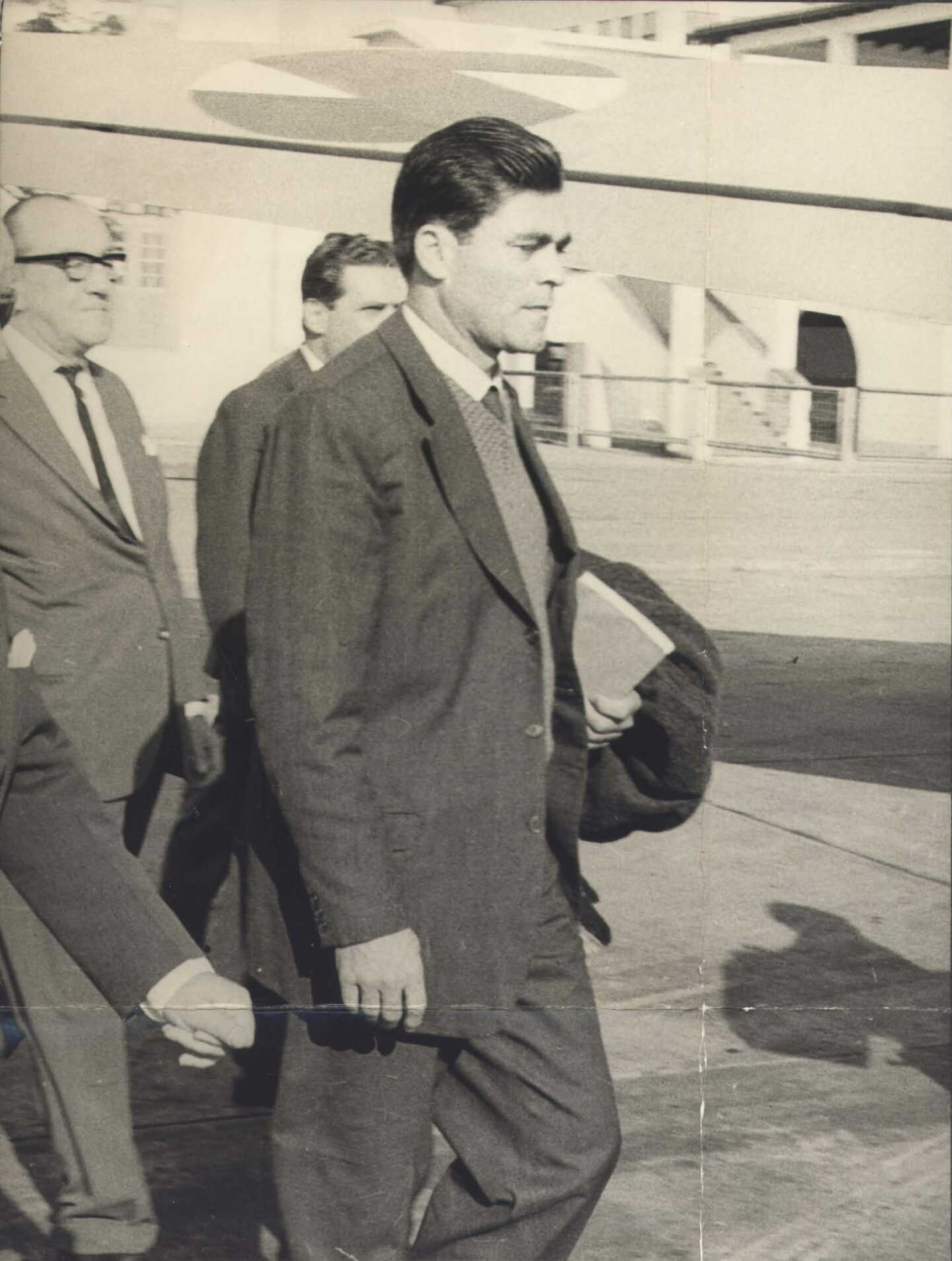
- Paulo de Mello Bastos going to Uruguay as a political refugee in 1964
- Born: May 25, 1918; São José da Laje, Alagoas
- Died: May 30, 2019 (aged 101)
- Known for: To have been one of the main union leaders in the 60s in Brazil.
- Spouse: Edelena Albernaz de Mello Bastos
- Awards: Santos-Dumont Merit Medal; Chico Mendes Medal of Resistance
- Aviation career
- Flight license: April 6, 1940
- Air force: Brazilian Air Force
- Battles: World War II
- Rank: Lieutenant colonel
- Children: João W. Nery; Solange Bastos; Tânia Bastos; Flávia Cavalcanti
- Parents: Sebastião Marques de Mello Bastos (father); Honorinha Portela Bastos (mother)

Paulo de Mello Bastos (São José da Laje, May 25, 1918 — May 30, 2019) was a former leader of the Brazilian National Union of Aeronauts, a former leader of the General Workers Command (Note: He was also a former president of the National Federation of Air Transport Workers. You can read all of his union assignments in Bastos 2003, p. 205) and a former Varig pilot whose resignation in 1963 inspired a general strike the country.

== Biography ==
=== Childhood ===
Paulo de Mello Bastos was born at the Engenho do Roçadinho, in São José da Laje, on May 25, 1918, son of Sebastião Marques de Mello Bastos, founder and former mayor of Panelas and Honorinha Portela Bastos.

=== Education ===
Paulo de Mello Bastos studied at Americano Baptista (Recife), Diocesano College (Maceió), Alagoano Lyceum (Alagoas) and at Quinze de Novembro de Garanhuns (Pernambuco).

=== Career ===
==== Air Force ====
In 1938 he was among those enrolled in the Administration Course for Naval Air Reserve officers by decision of the Navy Minister.

On April 6, 1940, Paulo de Mello received his naval aviator pilot's license, graduating as the first in his class. In the same year he tried to volunteer for the Royal Air Force to fight against Germany during WWII, but it was not possible because Brazil had not yet entered the war at that time. In 1941 he was promoted to the rank of 2nd Lieutenant. In 1942 he was a pilot for the National Air Mail, (Note: Something that had already occurred in 1941, the first year he flew in this category.) flying the Tocantins route between January 13 and 27 and between Rio-Natal between June 24 and June 26. In March of the same year he was transferred to the Aeronautics School. In April he had been assigned as an instructor at the School of Aeronautics.

On 12 January 1943 he was promoted by to the rank of First Lieutenant. In this period, already during World War II, he participated in the creation of the Aeronautics Club, a place where officers would hold political discussions, leisure, and culture. He fought in Europe during World War II against Nazism, and was decorated for his service. In 1945 he was promoted to the rank of Air Captain due to his time in service. In 1946 he applied for discharge from military service to work in the civilian sector. However, his application was only filed in 1954.

In the 1940s he was part of a committee that sought to inspire Getúlio Vargas to run for president in 1950 and to establish Petrobras, a company whose creation he had been defending for some years as a member of the nationalist side of the Armed Forces. In 1950 he was promoted to the rank of Major by "merit principle". In the same year he worked at the Directorate of Education of the Air Force. In December 1951 he received a bronze medal for more than ten years of active service.

In February 1952 he had his name proposed as part of the re-election of the Military Club's board of directors. The following year he was promoted to the rank of lieutenant colonel and transferred to the paid reserve.

==== Civilian aviation ====
In 1954 he joined Varig. The following year he petitioned the Supreme Federal Court for habeas corpus for former minister Epaminondas Gomes dos Santos, who was being charged with a crime of defamation, claiming that the crime was not military in nature, and was refused on May 6, 1955, for not being the correct person to make the request. On November 12 of the same year, when already secretary of the National Union of Aeronauts, he was one of the signers of the manifest in favor of a constitutional government after the November 11 counter-coup carried out by Marshal Teixeira Lott against the government of Carlos Luz. In December 1955 he even submitted his resignation from his position as President of the Pilots' Union, but was turned down for lack of the legal number present for consideration.

In 1956 he was a member of the commission that held the commemorations of the fiftieth anniversary of Alberto Santos Dumont's flight in the 14-bis. In March 1957 he advocated, with the pilots' category, the reduction from 12 to 10 daily working hours, as a way to avoid fatigue. In May of the same year he was one of the union leaders that addressed a letter to the Ministry of Aeronautics in defense of airline safety, after thirteen accidents occurred in a 20-day period. On May 31 he was elected president of the governing board of the National Union of Aeronauts, which was in power until the election of the board. At the same meeting it was decided to merge the National Union of Air Transport Pilots with the National Union of Aeronauts. In 1959, already a Varig airline captain, Paulo de Mello Bastos defended the creation of Aerobrás.

In July 1961 he was one of the union leaders who greeted cosmonaut Yuri Gagarin on his visit to Brazil. In the same year he was the pilot responsible for bringing the then Vice-president João Goulart to Brazil within the context of the Legality Campaign, which led him to take on a risky, low-altitude style of flying during the journey due to rumors that members of the Brazilian Air Force would shoot him down in accordance with Operation Mosquito. In the same period he chaired a delegation of trade unionists that visited the Soviet Union. In 1962 he was one of the leaders of the General Workers Command and politically supported the Base Reforms, but he was not a communist. In November of the same year he represented the pilot class in an inquiry into the crash of a VASP airplane, which collided with a tourist plane, resulting in 26 deaths. During his time at Varig, he also turned down several promotion proposals, which were aimed, according to Bastos, at controlling his union activities.

===== Mello Bastos strike =====
On May 21 he was chosen as vice-president of the CGT and in the next day he was elected as secretary of the General Workers Command. On the 25th, despite having union immunity, he was illegally fired from Varig, something that worried then president João Goulart, who tried to intercede on behalf of Paulo de Mello, (Note: Labor Minister Almino Afonso, among those who considered Paulo de Mello Bastos' dismissal illegal, also tried to intercede, besides having recognized the strike as legitimate, a position that the President of Brazil reiterated in a meeting with representatives of the strike. João Goulart only got involved after the Minister did not consider himself capable of carrying out the proper negotiations to avoid the strike and the fact that he failed to resolve it quickly led a faction of the CGT to consider a public break with the then president. The Supreme Federal Court considered both the dismissal and the strike to be illegal.) and the fact that he was not reinstated, started a general strike with road workers, airline workers, oil tankers, among others, which became known as the "Mello Bastos strike", an act that the newspaper "Novos Rumos" considered unprecedented within the union movement in Brazil until then and which was reported internationally, such as in the Colombian newspaper "El Tiempo" and in the Costa Rican La Nación. (Note: An analysis of the "Diario Carioca" says that the strike was initially going to be called by the CGT as a way to pressure the approval of the base reforms, but with the creation of the Union of Workers' Unions by the trade union advisor to the Presidency (aiming to divide the CGT), this would become impossible. However, Paulo de Mello's dismissal would have created the climate for a general strike.)

In a note, Varig reported that the dismissal would have occurred due to the captain's "serious fault", which would justify the end of the contract and later declared that only the Judiciary could decide on the case. (Note: The "Association of Pilots from Panair do Brasil" considered the same, among other things, so they advised against their members participating in the strike. VARIG's employees also opposed the strike. The National Union of Aeronauts and of Air Workers even denounced that Varig was forcing its employees to sign a manifesto against Captain Mello Bastos, with the risk of dismissal otherwise. The strikers were also in favor of federal intervention in Varig.) Commander Paulo de Mello had denounced on May 12, 1963, as part of the TV Tupi program "Sem Retoque", the financial misuse in commercial aviation, (Note: In his book, Paulo de Mello Bastos says that the resignation came after he had passed on a telegram supporting a report in the "Política e Negócios" magazine about the lack of airline safety.) criticized the results of the CPI on air accidents (Note: Speaking to the "Tribuna da Imprensa", Paulo de Mello said that he only reproduced in his speech the results of the investigation.) and blamed Varig for the air accidents that happened at the time. (Note: Sasaki 2015 says that the dismissal was due to the commander having sent a letter to the Ministry of Aeronautics recommending the creation of Aerobrás, something that the then president of Varig, Ruben Berta, would not accept being discussed and fired anyone who contradicted him, because he did not want a state-owned company to absorb Varig.)

He was finally rehired by Varig, after the president's appeal, on June 7, but had his salary suspended (Note: The "Diário Carioca" of June 18 said that he would continue to receive his salary.) and the right to fly until the decision of the Labor Court. His reinstatement was considered by the Unity and Action Pact, according to the Diário Carioca, to represent "the guarantee of the rights of all union leadership in the country." With the reinstatement, Varig's president, Ruben Berta, stepped down from his position. In July 1963 he received Cr$ 437,127 in unpaid wages, but refused the proposal to terminate his contract with the company and receive compensation of approximately Cr$ 7 million, which he considered offensive to him. He was barred by the company from resuming his position as an Aircraft Commander.

In June, during the events of the strike, Paulo de Mello was one of the signers of the manifesto delivered to João Goulart in which they defended, among other demands, the "firm disposition of the workers to fight alongside the president of the Republic, if necessary, in the case of a break with the International Monetary Fund".

==== Post-Strike ====
In August 1963 he took part in demonstrations to pressure the government to create Aerobrás. In September he was one of the articulators after the sergeants' revolt and in October he was one of the union leaders who sought to defend João Goulart's mandate after the call for a state of siege.

Voice of Paulo de Mello Bastos calling the population to the Central Rally.

In January 1964 Paulo de Mello Bastos spoke to the Diário de Pernambuco about what he expected from the eventual presidential elections, with the possibility of the Brazilian left running with Miguel Arraes or Leonel Brizola. However, with the indirect elections of 1964, the 1965 elections were cancelled.

In February an indictment was filed under the National Security Law that involved his name alongside other leaders for having launched a manifesto preceding the October 15, 1962 general strike. In the same period he was involved in the organization of a support coalition so that the government would be able to approve the base reforms. On March 27, 1964, he was one of the leaders involved in resolving the Sailors' revolt.

===== 1964 coup d'état =====
In the events of March 31, 1964, Paulo de Mello Bastos managed to escape from prison when troops invaded the building where he was meeting with a group of union members. In the course of the 1964 Brazilian coup d'état, he had his political rights suspended by AI-1 until the Amnesty Law in August 28, 1979; lost his aviator's license; although he held a union leadership position at the time, he was fired from Varig; fired from Brazilian Air Force on September 24, 1964; and came to seek political asylum at the Uruguayan Embassy on April 12, 1964. However, he only managed to leave the country on June 19 in a Uruguayan Air Force plane, going to Montevideo, after receiving his safe conduct to leave the country.

Officially he was declared dead and his wife received a widow's pension. In Uruguay he tried to get a job at PLUNA, but was barred due to pressure from the Brazilian government against political exiles (Note: He also tried employment with LAN Chile and Air Algerie, but was also prevented from doing so by pressure from the Brazilian government.) and in the country also worked in the wine trade. (Note: In his book he describes that he created, together with other exiles, the company "Pollolandia", a poultry and egg house, but it did not last. In the same period he also made friends with members of the Tupamaros.) In 1965 he was one of the 83 people who had to return the Santos-Dumont Merit Medal by order of President Castelo Branco and in the same year was the target of an investigation that pointed him out as a member of a "counter-revolution" articulated by Leonel Brizola.

Paulo de Mello only received the safe conduct from Itamaraty in 1966 (Note: In the same year he was indicted by an IPM, filed in 1967. However, in 1968 investigations were still underway seeking to attribute some culpability in "subversive activities" to Paulo de Mello and other unionists. In 1971 the Navy acquitted him and others accused under the National Security Law due to lack of evidence of alleged "subversive activities" within the João Goulart Government.) and returned to the country in October 1967. (Note: In his book he describes that he entered Brazil clandestinely in 1967 with the help of the Brazilian Communist Party and only regularized his situation after being kidnapped by police forces in October of the same year. In 1969 he entered a competition at the Dobermann Club with his pet, which he won in the "Best Male" category.) In the same month that he returned to the country, he was arrested by DOPS for questioning, and released soon after. In 1968 he started working for the newspaper "Correio da Manhã", which had become part of the opposition to the military dictatorship. During the 1970s he worked on international denunciations against the crimes of the military dictatorship, sending documents abroad, and was also one of the articulators of the Amnesty law.

Rede Brasil Atual described that Paulo de Mello never accepted the dictatorship implanted in 1964. By dictatorship decree, he could not return to being a pilot and worked as a taxi-driver in Rio de Janeiro. Was amnestied by the Air Force in February 1980 and in 1981 tried to return to his job at Varig through the Amnesty Law. But in practice, Amnesty had only returned his political rights. Before the end of the dictatorship he was one of the organizers of the Centro Brasil Democrático, linked to the PCB.

==== Return to the democratic period ====
From 1991 on, he had a hard time to get his amnesty retirement, which was only solved after an injunction from the Federal Court. In this period, during the government of Leonel Brizola in Rio de Janeiro, he accepted to be the director of the State Foundation for Education of the Minor, at the Santos Dumont School, where he tried to remove the repressive methods and give education to orphaned, street or delinquent girls. In 1998 he began his writing career, with his first book, "Salvo Conduto" (Safe Conduct), published by Garamond, describing his career as a union leader and on the same occasion received the "Destaque Aeronauta" award, from the National Union of Aeronauts. In August 1999 he released the book "Nos Bastidores da Anistia" (Behind the Scenes of Amnesty).

On October 23, 2003, he was restored the Santos-Dumont Merit Medal. In March 2006 Paulo de Mello testified at the Amnesty Commission and in September of the same year published the book "A Caixa-Preta do Golpe de 64" (The Black-Box from the 1964 Coup d'état). In July 2011 he was involved in honoring the centennial of Brigadier Francisco Teixeira, who in 1948 launched The oil is ours only campaign. In 2014 he was one of the CGT representatives still alive who signed a document sent to the Ministry of Labor that requested a survey of interventions in trade union centrals between 1946 and 1988. In 2018 he was honored by the Torture Never Again Group, receiving the Chico Mendes Medal of Resistance.

== Death ==
Paulo de Mello Bastos died on May 30, 2019, and was cremated at Carmo Memorial.

== Personal life ==
He married teacher Edelena Albernaz de Mello Bastos on January 23, 1943. He fathered João W. Nery, Solange Bastos, Flávia Cavalcanti and Tania de Mello Bastos. He was a cousin-brother of Luiz Portela de Carvalho, mayor of Palmares. In his career as an aviator he has accumulated more than 16,000 flight hours.

== Works ==
- Salvo Conduto (in Brazilian Portuguese) (1 ed.). Garamond. 1998. p. 207. ISBN 8586435139. OL 142889M.
  - Salvo Conduto (PDF) (in Brazilian Portuguese) (2 ed.). Família Bastos. 2003. p. 212. ISBN 85-89853-02-0. OL 30752756M.
- Nos Bastidores da Anistia (in Brazilian Portuguese). Ferreira Botelho. 1999. p. 208.
- Tauã, a verdade verdadeira que seu Noberto contou (PDF) (in Brazilian Portuguese). Família Bastos. 2003. p. 203. ISBN 85-89853-01-2. OL 30752870M.
- A Caixa-Preta do Golpe de 64 (PDF) (in Brazilian Portuguese). Família Bastos. 2006. p. 320. ISBN 85-89853-04-7. OL 23206352M.
- O Nordeste é um Só (PDF) (in Brazilian Portuguese). Família Bastos. 2010. p. 244. ISBN 978-85-89853-06-4. OL 30752402M.

== Bibliography ==
(Chronological order)

- "Reserva Naval Aerea". O Imparcial (in Brazilian Portuguese). Vol. 4, no. 939. 1938-06-18. p. 13.
- "Os Futuros Aviadores da Reserva Naval Aerea". Correio da Manhã (in Brazilian Portuguese). Vol. 38, no. 13376. 1938-06-18. p. 2.
- "Entrega de diplomas aos novos pilotos". Jornal do Commercio (in Brazilian Portuguese). Vol. 113, no. 158. 1940-04-07. pp. 09–10.
- "*". Jornal do Commercio (in Brazilian Portuguese). Vol. 113, no. 181. 1940-05-05. p. 8.
- "O Numero de Aviadores do Brasil". O Imparcial (in Brazilian Portuguese). Vol. 7, no. 1764. 1941-02-22. p. 2.
- "Correio Ae'reo Militar". O Imparcial (in Brazilian Portuguese). Vol. 7, no. 1790. 1941-03-28. p. 2.
- "Correio Aéreo Nacional". A Noite (in Brazilian Portuguese). Vol. 31, no. 10778. Rio de Janeiro. 1942-02-11. p. 4.
- "Noticiário do Ministério da Aeronáutica". A Noite (in Brazilian Portuguese). Vol. 31, no. 10809. 1942-03-15. p. 9.
- "Notícias do Ministério da Aeronáutica". Gazeta de Notícias (in Brazilian Portuguese). Vol. 68, no. 84. Rio de Janeiro. 1942-04-12. p. 5.
- "Escalas do Correio Aéreo Nacional". A Noite (in Brazilian Portuguese). Vol. 31, no. 10907. 1942-06-23. p. 6.
- "Atos do Chefe de Governo". Gazeta de Notícias (in Brazilian Portuguese). Vol. 69, no. 11. Rio de Janeiro. 1943-01-14. p. 2.
- "Assinados nas pastas da Aeronáutica, Agricultura, Exterior, Trabalho e Viação". Diário de Pernambuco (in Brazilian Portuguese). Vol. 120, no. 32. 1945-02-08. p. 4.
- "Outros despachos". A Manhã (in Brazilian Portuguese). Vol. 6, no. 1418. Rio de Janeiro. 1946-03-26. p. 3.
- "Senhorinha Merces Bastos". Jornal Pequeno (in Brazilian Portuguese). Vol. 49, no. 20. Recife. 1948-01-26. p. 2.
- "Ministério da Aeronáutica". A Manhã (in Brazilian Portuguese). Vol. 10, no. 2823. Rio de Janeiro. 1950-10-08. p. 3.
- "Atos do Ministro". A Manhã (in Brazilian Portuguese). Vol. 10, no. 2849. 1950-11-09. p. 10.
- "Decretos na Pasta da Aeronáutica". Jornal do Brasil (in Brazilian Portuguese). Vol. 61, no. 301. 1951-12-29. p. 9.
- "Conselho fiscal" (in Brazilian Portuguese). Vol. 11, no. 3246. 1952-02-05. p. 7.
- "Promoção e transferência para a reserva". Diario Carioca (in Brazilian Portuguese). Vol. 26, no. 7776. 1953-11-10. p. 9.
- "Promoção e transferência para a reserva". Diário de Notícias (in Brazilian Portuguese). Vol. 24, no. 9516. 1953-11-10. p. 6.
- "De mês a mês". O Malho (in Brazilian Portuguese). Vol. 51, no. 167. December 1953. p. 16.
- "Noticiário da Aeronautica". O Jornal (in Brazilian Portuguese). Vol. 35, no. 10230. Rio de Janeiro. 1954-01-13. p. 3.
- "O brigadeiro Epaminondas quer anular o processo". O Jornal (in Brazilian Portuguese). Vol. 34, no. 10619. Rio de Janeiro. 1955-04-23. p. 3.
- "O STM negou "habeas-corpus" a Epaminondas". Diario Carioca (in Brazilian Portuguese). Vol. 27, no. 8225. 1955-05-07. p. 8.
- "Negado "habeas-corpus" ao Brig. Epaminondas". Tribuna da Imprensa (in Brazilian Portuguese). Vol. 7, no. 1628. May 1955. p. 2.
- "Ano Santos-Dumont". Jornal do Commercio (in Brazilian Portuguese). Vol. 129, no. 237. 1955-07-10. p. 4.
- "Manifesto ao Povo". Imprensa Popular (in Brazilian Portuguese). Vol. 8, no. 1657. 1955-11-13. p. 2.
- "Apresentou Renúncia o presidente do Sindicato de Pilotos". Correio da Manhã (in Brazilian Portuguese). Vol. 60, no. 19248. 1955-12-23. p. 5.
- "Pilotos reivindicam 10 horas de trabalho". Tribuna da Imprensa (in Brazilian Portuguese). Vol. 11, no. 2195. 1957-03-22. p. 7.
- "13 acidentes de avião, nos últimos 20 dias". O Semanário (in Brazilian Portuguese). Vol. 2, no. 57. May 1957. p. 2.
- "Junta Governativa do Sindicato dos Aeronautas". Imprensa Popular (in Brazilian Portuguese). Vol. 10, no. 2128. 1957-06-01. p. 6.
- "Reúnem-se aeronautas e pilotos numa só organização de classe". Jornal do Brasil (in Brazilian Portuguese). Vol. 67, no. 126. 1957-06-01. p. 15.
- "Comandante da Varig diz que AEROBRÁS é a solução para a aviação comercial". Jornal do Brasil (in Brazilian Portuguese). Vol. 69, no. 243. 1959-10-17. p. 9.
- "Metalúrgicos". A Noite (in Brazilian Portuguese). Vol. 50, no. 15794. 1961-07-31. p. 4.
- "Aviões se chocam no ar em São Paulo e matam 26 pessoas". Jornal do Brasil (in Brazilian Portuguese). Vol. 72, no. 273. 1962-11-27. p. 5.
- "Almino e aeronautas apóiam Mello Bastos". Tribuna da Imprensa (in Brazilian Portuguese). Vol. 14, no. 3051. 1963-05-21. p. 6.
- "Varig decide hoje a sorte do comandante". Tribuna da Imprensa (in Brazilian Portuguese). Vol. 14, no. 3052. 1963-05-22. p. 5.
- "CGT em nova reunião 2ª feira vai marcar o dia da greve geral". Correio da Manhã (in Brazilian Portuguese). Vol. 62, no. 21511. 1963-05-22. p. 1.
- "CGT Elege Sua Comissão Executiva". Diário de Notícias (in Brazilian Portuguese). Vol. 33, no. 12424. 1963-05-23. p. 7.
- "De Quem o Crime?". Novos Rumos (in Brazilian Portuguese). Vol. 5, no. 232. May 1963. p. 1.
- "Comunidado". Diário de Notícias (in Brazilian Portuguese). Vol. 33, no. 12427. 1963-05-26. p. 3.
- "Comandante demitido confirmou acusações". Tribuna da Imprensa (in Brazilian Portuguese). Vol. 14, no. 3056. 1963-05-27. p. 4.
- "Coluna Sindical". Última Hora (in Brazilian Portuguese). 1963-05-28. p. 2.
- "Aéronautas Adiam Greve". Correio Paulistano (in Brazilian Portuguese). Vol. 109, no. 32830. 1963-05-28. p. 1.
- "Deputados querem destaque para emenda dos interinos". Diario de Natal (in Brazilian Portuguese). Vol. 23, no. 6903. 1963-05-28. p. 3.
- "Aeroviários deflagarão greve de solidariedade ao colega demitido". A Tribuna (in Brazilian Portuguese). Vol. 70, no. 53. 1963-05-28. p. 9.
- "Causa da greve". Diario do Paraná (in Brazilian Portuguese). Vol. 9, no. 2795. 1963-05-29. p. 1.
- "Comunicado da Associação dos Pilotos da Panair do Brasil aos seus associados". Diario da Noite (in Brazilian Portuguese). Vol. 38, no. 11768. 1963-05-29. p. 4.
- "Jango não deu apoio à emenda pessedista". Última Hora (in Brazilian Portuguese). 1963-05-30. p. 4.
- "Desarticulada a greve: CGT fica sòzinho". O Jornal (in Brazilian Portuguese). Vol. 42, no. 12878. 1963-05-30.
- "Apreensão no País com a greve geral que paralizará tôdas as atividades". Jornal do Comercio (in Brazilian Portuguese). Vol. 59, no. 18138. 1963-05-31.
- "Ferroviarios solidários". Luta Democrática (in Brazilian Portuguese). Vol. 10, no. 2836. 1963-05-31. p. 3.
- "Nota de esclarescimento". Última Hora (in Brazilian Portuguese). 1963-06-01.
- "Disse o Presidente João Goulart, ao repórter de "A Noite"". A Noite (in Brazilian Portuguese). 1963-06-01. p. 1.
- "Só a Justiça reintegrará o Comandante". Diario de Natal (in Brazilian Portuguese). Vol. 23, no. 6907. 1963-06-01. p. 1.
- "Comunidado da VARIG". O Jornal (in Brazilian Portuguese). Vol. 42, no. 12880. 1963-06-01. p. 7.
- "Greve parou os trens e quase não atinge os aviões". Diário de Notícias (in Brazilian Portuguese). Vol. 33, no. 12432. 1963-06-01. p. 2.
- "Huelga Parcial de Aviadores Afrontan Empresas del Brasil". El Tiempo (in Spanish). Vol. 52, no. 17928. 1963-06-01. p. 6.
- "Por huelga, puente aereo entre Sao Paulo y Rio". La Nación (in Spanish). Vol. 17, no. 5167. p. 41.
- "STF condena aeronautas e a VARIG". Jornal do Brasil (in Brazilian Portuguese). Vol. 73, no. 126. 1963-06-01. p. 3.
- "Com Jango". Tribuna da Imprensa (in Brazilian Portuguese). Vol. 14, no. 3061. June 1963. p. 3.
- "Greve dos aeronautas no 2º dia, transcorre, sem incidentes". O Poti (in Brazilian Portuguese). Vol. 9, no. 1440. 1963-06-02. p. 6.
- "Aeronautas ameaçam deflagrar uma nova greve: solução virá de Jango e Almino". Última Hora (in Brazilian Portuguese). Vol. 3, no. 620. 1963-06-03. p. 6.
- "Análise". Diario Carioca (in Brazilian Portuguese). Vol. 35, no. 10804. 1963-06-03.
- "Nota Oficial". Última Hora (in Brazilian Portuguese). Vol. 12, no. 4066. 1963-06-05. p. 2.
- "Ao Sr. Presidente da República". Última Hora (in Brazilian Portuguese). Vol. 12, no. 4067. 1963-06-06. p. 2.
- "Nota da VARIG". O Jornal (in Brazilian Portuguese). Vol. 42, no. 12884. 1963-06-06. p. 3.
- "Trabalhadores a Goulart: Lutaremos Contra FMI". Diário de Notícias (in Brazilian Portuguese). Vol. 35, no. 12436. 1963-06-06. p. 2.
- Daily Report, Foreign Radio Broadcasts. Foreign Broadcast Information Services. 1963-06-07. p. 63.
- "Readmitido o comandante Paulo Melo Bastos". A Tribuna (in Brazilian Portuguese). Vol. 70, no. 63. 1963-06-08. p. 5.
- "Melo Bastos readmitido pela VARIG". Diario Carioca (in Brazilian Portuguese). Vol. 35, no. 10809. 1963-06-08. p. 6.
- "Demissão da VARIG virou suspensão". Correio da Manhã (in Brazilian Portuguese). Vol. 62, no. 21527. 1963-06-09. p. 3.
- "Antes das outras". Novos Rumos (in Brazilian Portuguese). Vol. 5, no. 334. June 1963. p. 2.
- "Comando quer denunciar JG aos trabalhadores". Tribuna da Imprensa (in Brazilian Portuguese). Vol. 14, no. 3069. 1963-06-11. p. 2.
- "PUA reúne hoje e vai lançar nôvo manifesto". Diario Carioca (in Brazilian Portuguese). Vol. 35, no. 10812. 1963-06-12. p. 6.
- "Morre veterano das excursões". Correio da Manhã (in Brazilian Portuguese). Vol. 62, no. 21529. 1963-06-12. p. 4.
- "Aeronautas encerrarão hoje caso Mello Bastos". Diario Carioca (in Brazilian Portuguese). Vol. 35, no. 10817. 1963-06-18. p. 5.
- "Melo Bastos recebe salários na Justiça". Diario Carioca (in Brazilian Portuguese). Vol. 35, no. 10832. 1963-07-05. p. 9.
- "Mello Bastos revusa recisão de contrato e só quer readmissão". Correio da Manhã (in Brazilian Portuguese). Vol. 63, no. 21549. 1963-07-05. p. 9.
- "Aeronautas pedem a Goulart definição do seu Govêrno sôbre criação da Aerobrás". Jornal do Brasil (in Brazilian Portuguese). Vol. 73, no. 203. 1963-08-30. p. 12.
- "CGT não encerra agitação: greve de apoio aos sargentos na pauta". Jornal do dia (in Brazilian Portuguese). Vol. 17, no. 4472. 1963-09-19. p. 8.
- "CGT enfrenta conspiradores em defesa do mandato de Goulart". Última Hora (in Brazilian Portuguese). Vol. 3, no. 730. 1963-10-09. p. 2.
- "Sindicatos Permanecem Mobilizados Contra Ação Golpista". Última Hora (in Brazilian Portuguese). Vol. 13, no. 4173. 1963-10-09. p. 8.
- "Esquerdas Lançariam JK E Lançariam Arraes". Diário de Pernambuco (in Brazilian Portuguese). Vol. 139, no. 11. 1964-01-14. p. 1.
- "Novo Ciclo". O Semanário (in Brazilian Portuguese). Vol. 8, no. 369. January 1964. p. 7.
- "CGT e UNE em mobilização por reformas". Tribuna da Imprensa (in Brazilian Portuguese). Vol. 15, no. 4267. 1964-02-03. p. 4.
- "Foi arquivado processo contra líderes sindicais". A Luta Democrática (in Brazilian Portuguese). Vol. 11, no. 2082. 1964-02-26. p. 3.
- "Marinheiros revoltados só confiam no CGT". Diário de Notícias (in Brazilian Portuguese). Vol. 34, no. 12694. 1964-03-27. p. 2.
- "Fuzileiros cobrem CGT contra polícia". Correio da Manhã (in Brazilian Portuguese). Vol. 63, no. 21776. 1964-04-01. p. 1.
- "Melo Bastos seguiu para o Uruguai". A Tribuna (in Brazilian Portuguese). Vol. 71, no. 71. 1964-06-20. p. 5.
- "A revolução supera a fase das cassações". Jornal do Brasil (in Brazilian Portuguese). Vol. 74, no. 145. 1964-06-21. p. 8.
- "Mais expurgo na Marinha e FAB". Diário de Notícias (in Brazilian Portuguese). Vol. 40, no. 172. 1964-09-25. p. 1.
- "850 elementos..." Diario de Natal (in Brazilian Portuguese). Vol. 24, no. 7291. 1964-09-25. p. 4.
- "Govêrno Impede Que Exilados se Empreguem no Exterior". Última Hora (in Brazilian Portuguese). Vol. 14, no. 1445. 1964-12-15. p. 3.
- "Permanecem No Uruguai Mais De 100 Exilados". Diário de Pernambuco (in Brazilian Portuguese). Vol. 140, no. 5. 1965-01-07. p. 2.
- "Jânio encabeça lista de 83 que perderam medalha do Mérito Aeronáutico". Jornal do Brasil (in Brazilian Portuguese). Vol. 74, no. 50. 1965-03-13. p. 4.
- "Em dois anos Itamarati atendeu a 215 asilados". Jornal do Commercio (in Brazilian Portuguese). Vol. 139, no. 151. 1966-04-01. p. 5.
- "João Goulart e JK os principais indiciados no inquérito da CNTI". O Fluminense (in Brazilian Portuguese). Vol. 89, no. 22436. 1966-09-21. p. 3.
- "Juiz arquiva IPM e alega que ideologia não é crime". O Jornal (in Brazilian Portuguese). Vol. 48, no. 14128. 1967-10-17. p. 5.
- "IPM dos aeroviários". O Jornal (in Brazilian Portuguese). Vol. 48, no. 14236. 1968-02-23. p. 5.
- "Restam trezentos asilados ainda sem poder voltar". Correio da Manhã (in Brazilian Portuguese). Vol. 67, no. 23037. 1968-05-18. p. 5.
- "Trezendos cassados ainda fora do País". A Tribuna (in Brazilian Portuguese). Vol. 75, no. 55. 1968-05-21. p. 4.
- "Pentacampeão foi de novo vencedor no Dobermann Club". Correio da Manhã (in Brazilian Portuguese). Vol. 69, no. 23490. 1969-11-12. p. 8.
- "Marinha absolve aeroviários". Correio da Manhã (in Brazilian Portuguese). Vol. 70, no. 23907. 1971-03-24. p. 6.
- "Capitão cassado faz nova acusação a Burnier e Honaiser é contestado". Manchete (in Brazilian Portuguese). Vol. 26, no. 1357. 1978-04-22. p. 132.
- "Anistia para os aeronautas". Correio Braziliense (in Brazilian Portuguese). No. 6211. 1980-02-08. p. 8.
- "78 militares anistiados na Aeronáutica". Correio Braziliense (in Brazilian Portuguese). No. 6227. 1980-02-26. p. 4.
- "Anistia só deu direito de votar e ser votado". A Tribuna (in Brazilian Portuguese). Vol. 87, no. 88. 1980-06-21. p. 7.
- "Ironia da história". Alto Madeira (in Brazilian Portuguese). Vol. 63, no. 13710. 1981-04-08. p. 2.
- "Aeronautas querem voltar com anistia". Tribuna da Imprensa (in Brazilian Portuguese). Vol. 30, no. 9749. August 1981. p. 4.
- "Um vôo histórico". Manchete (in Brazilian Portuguese). Vol. 47, no. 2433. Bloch. 1998-11-21. p. 72. ISSN 0025-2042.
- "Aqui & Ali". Jornal do Commercio (in Brazilian Portuguese). Vol. 172, no. 269. 1999-08-24. p. 19.
- "Pauta". Agência Brasil (in Brazilian Portuguese). 2003-12-01.
- Bastos, Comandante Paulo de Mello (2003). Salvo Conduto (PDF) (in Brazilian Portuguese) (2 ed.). Família Bastos. p. 212. ISBN 85-89853-02-0. OL 30752756M.
- "Fez 100 anos o criador do slogan o petróleo é nosso". Jornal da ABI (in Brazilian Portuguese). No. 368. July 2011. p. 15.
- Nery, João W. (2012). Viagem Solitária (in Brazilian Portuguese) (1 ed.). Leya. p. 336. ISBN 9788580444636.
- Acervo Rádio Nacional / EBC (2014-03-12). "Paulo Mello Bastos: convocação para o comício da Central do Brasil". memoria.ebc.com.br (in Brazilian Portuguese).
- Lima Vieira, Rosângela de (2014). Ecos da ditadura na sociedade brasileira (1964-2014) (in Brazilian Portuguese). Oficina Universitária. p. 278. ISBN 9788579835735.
- "O Comando Geral dos Trabalhadores e a caixa preta do golpe". GGN (in Brazilian Portuguese). 2014-04-01.
- Accarini, André; Chevalier, Henri; Pedreira, William (2014-12-08). "Não há anistia para violações de Direitos Humanos". CUT (in Brazilian Portuguese).
- Batistella, Alessandro (2015). "Os reflexos políticos do golpe de 1964 no Paraná e as eleições de 1965". História (in Brazilian Portuguese). 34 (1): 274–302. doi:10.1590/1980-436920150001000050. ISSN 1980-4369.
- Sasaki, Daniel Leb (2015). Pouso forçado (in Brazilian Portuguese). Editora Record. p. 490. ISBN 9788501105530.
- Gaspari, Elio (2016). A didatura acabada (in Brazilian Portuguese). Editora Intrinseca. p. 447. ISBN 9788580579161.
- Vieira, Isabela (2018-04-02). "Grupo Tortura Nunca Mais entrega medalhas a defensores de direitos humanos". Agência Brasil (in Brazilian Portuguese).
- Tavares, Ana Helena (2019-05-31). "Morre Mello Bastos, piloto que salvou Jango". Quem tem medo da democracia? (in Brazilian Portuguese). Archived from the original on 2022-09-12.
- Nuzzi, Vitor (2019-06-01). "Piloto de Jango, morre o comandante Mello Bastos, do CGT e da 'república sindicalista'". Rede Brasil Atual (in Brazilian Portuguese).
- "O último voo de Mello Bastos, o piloto herói que garantiu a posse de Jango". Hora do Povo (in Brazilian Portuguese). 2019-06-02.
- "Nota de pesar – Comandante Paulo de Mello Bastos, ex-diretor do SNA". Sindicato Nacional dos Aeronautas (in Brazilian Portuguese). 2019-06-04.
- Lima, Luiz Octavio de (2020). Os anos de chumbo (in Brazilian Portuguese). Planeta. p. 432. ISBN 9786555350036.
- Silva, Ricardo Santos da (2021). Os Não-anistiados (in Brazilian Portuguese). Editora Diaética. p. 188. ISBN 9786558775690.
- Machado, Matheus Vitorino (2021). A campanha pela reparação: as associações de trabalhadores e militares pela anistia (PDF) (Dissertação) (in Brazilian Portuguese). Universidade do Estado do Rio de Janeiro. p. 116.
- "Autores - Família Bastos". familiabastos.net (in Brazilian Portuguese).
