= Operation Tarantula =

Operation Tarantula (Brazilian Portuguese: Operação Tarântula) was a major police operation carried out in São Paulo between February 27 and March 10, 1987. It was based on the criminalization of sex work by travesti and transgender people, in the context of the HIV epidemic in Brazil. 56 travestis were arrested on the first night of the operation.

== History ==
In Brazil, at the end of the 1980s, a process of redemocratization was underway, following more than two decades of Brazilian military dictatorship (1964–1985). During this period of political opening, society expected the extension of fundamental rights and guarantees to vulnerable populations.

From the early 1980s until at least the early 1990s, there was a moral panic related to the proliferation of AIDS, then associated with gay men and transgender women, being named, in the academic field, as Gay Related Immune Deficiency (GRID) and, in the media, as "gay cancer", "gay plague" or "pink plague", which resulted in the stigmatization of the LGBTQ population. On May 1, 1980, O Estado de S. Paulo displayed the following headline: "Police already have a joint plan against travestis". In 1981, Jornal do Brasil published the article "New disease affects homosexuals in the USA".

Police persecution intensified between 1980 and 1985, when police chief José Wilson Richetti ordered the mass arrest of travestis and transgender people through operations known as "Clean-up" (Portuguese: Limpeza) and "Round-up" (Portuguese: Rondão), which led to the arrest of more than 1,500 people in downtown São Paulo alone.

Operation Tarantula was based on Article 130 of the Brazilian Penal Code (promulgated in 1940), which condemns to imprisonment of three months to one year (or a fine) any individual who exposes someone to the contagion of a venereal disease with which they know they are infected. An additional year is added to the sentence if the individual intends to transmit the disease. The operation was, therefore, an action to combat AIDS.

At the same time, the operation was linked to an apocalyptic religious ideology, centered on the criminalization of prostitution, especially of transgender people, while concealing information about HIV transmission among cisgender heterosexuals. In the early days of the operation, Márcio Prudente Cruz, chief delegate of the department that brought together the regional police stations of the São Paulo Metropolitan Region (Degran), pontificated: "The times of Nostradamus are coming."

The travestis apprehended by the police were facing charges for the crime of venereal disease transmission, and newspapers of the time indicated the possibility of compulsory testing to detect sexually transmitted diseases, with the penal system appearing as an instrument to contain the growing spread of HIV.

LGBTQ rights groups pressured the São Paulo Public Security Secretariat to end the operation. During the 12 days of Operation Tarantula, it is estimated that more than 300 transvestites were arrested. In addition to them, many others were killed.

Neon Cunha, one of the survivors of Operation Tarantula, recalls, in an interview with CNN Brasil, what she went through at the time:

When the black and white police van (called "the boat") passed by, it caused panic. It was all violence; they could "bring down the baton" or worse.

In downtown São Paulo, I saw a Black trans woman executed with a shot to the forehead. The police officer said: "What are you looking at? Run while you're alive."

Every now and then, bodies were found in the streets.

== Origin of the name ==
Operation Tarantula was named as such because "the tarantula does, in fact, have long arms", just like the operation, which covered a large part of the São Paulo Metropolitan Region, including Osasco, Guarulhos and ABC Paulista.

== See also ==
- Transgender history in Brazil
