= Dina Alma de Paradeda =

Brazilian socialite

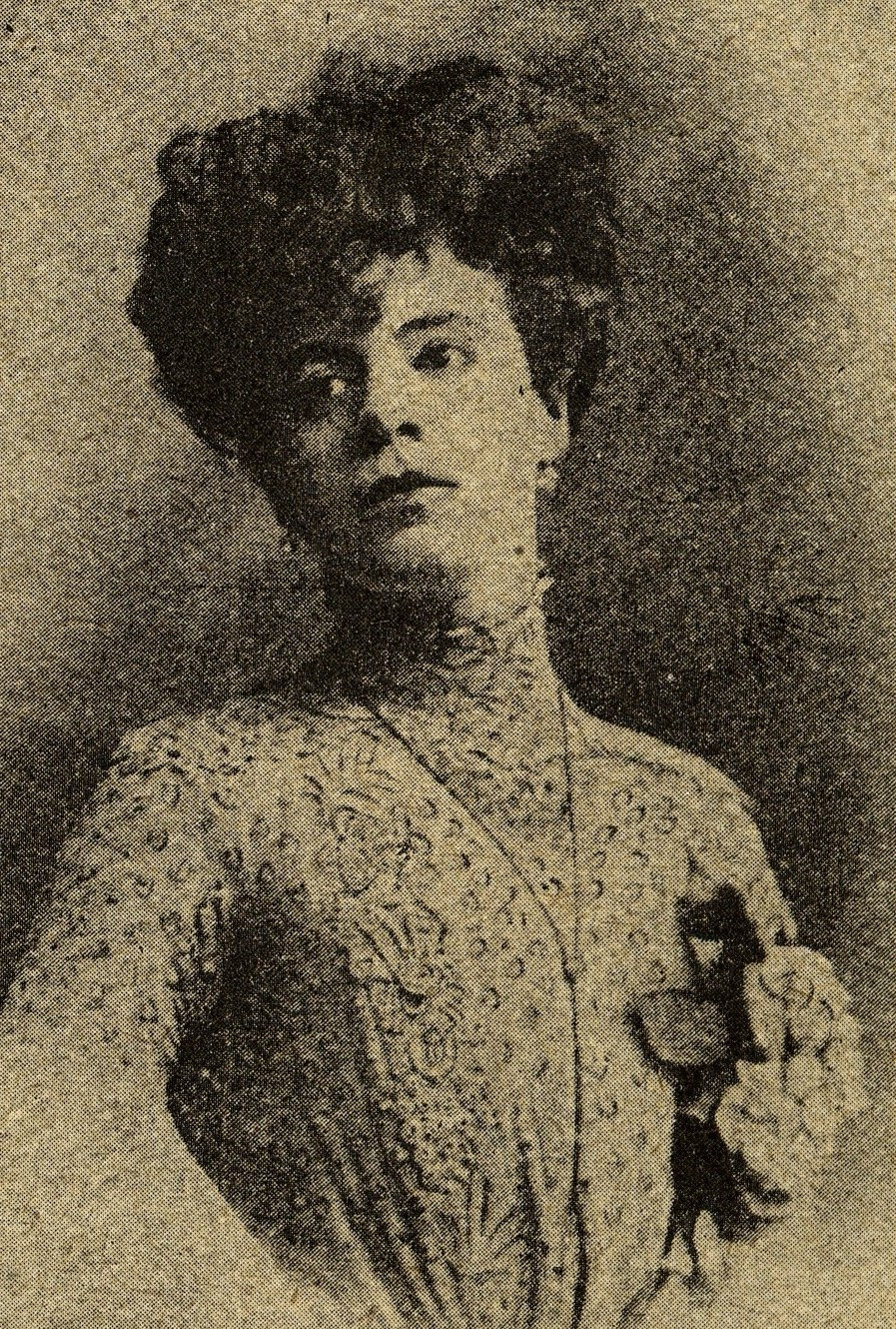
- Born: 1871; Empire of Brazil
- Died: 8 December 1906 (aged 34–35); Breslau, German Empire

Dina Alma de Paradeda, usually known simply as Alma de Paradeda (1871 – 8 December 1906, age 35, Breslau), was a Brazilian socialite, known for the circumstances of her death (poisoning herself in front of a doctor, who, after examining the body, revealed she was physically male) and subsequent media interest in the story; the numerous testimonies of it made her one of the first documented and known by name transgender women either of South American origin or living in Central-Eastern Europe.

== Early life ==
Paradeda was born in 1871 as Alfred (or Alfredo) H., to a Brazilian woman, and probably a Spanish consul, and a count from Rio de Janeiro, and had at least one brother. After her father's death, her mother remarried, this time to an affluent German doctor who lived in Brazil.

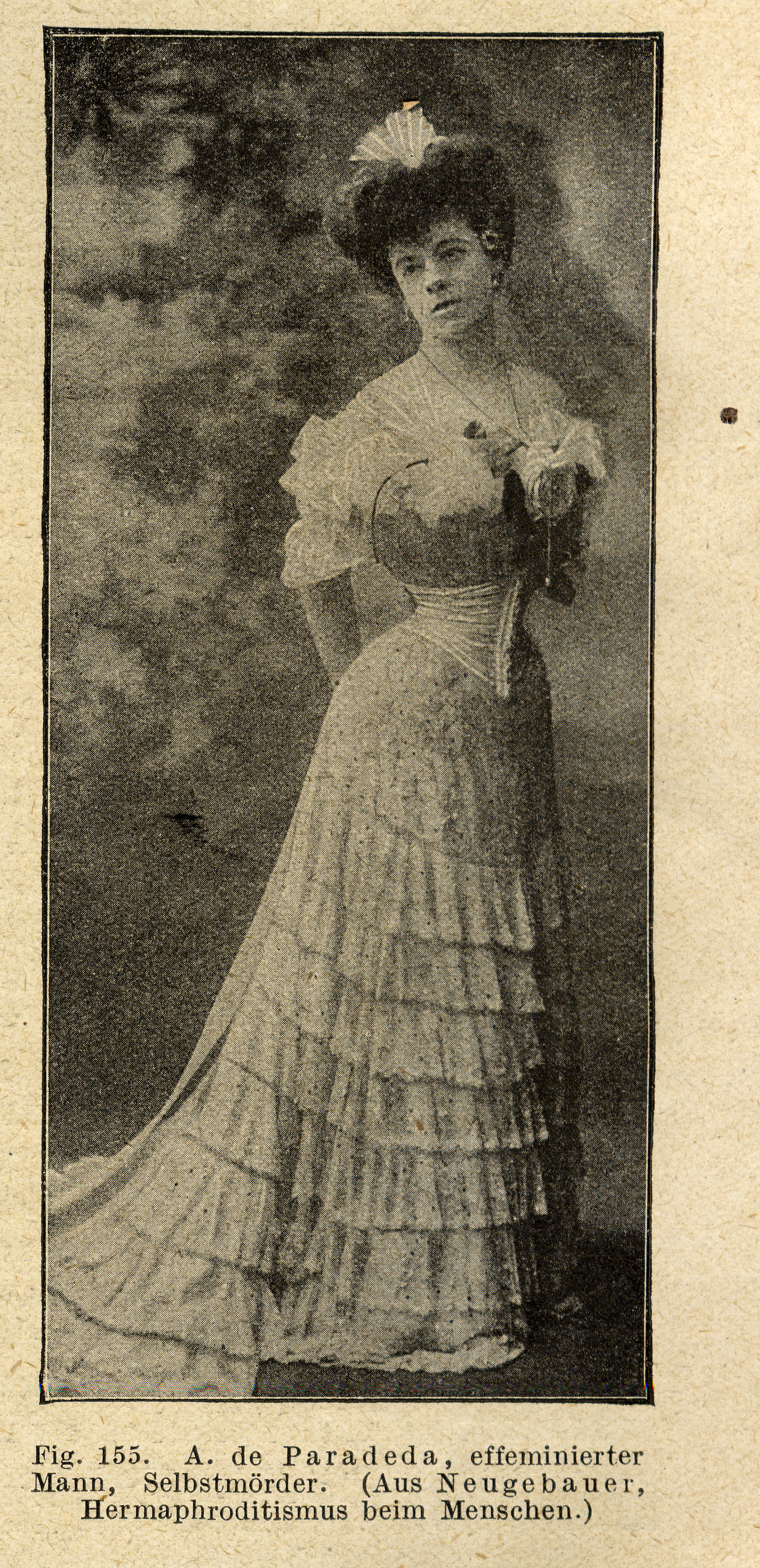
Photograph of Paradeda taken in Naples

== Europe ==
Between 1899 and 1900, Paradeda was already a prominent figure of Berlin urning balls. During one of them in 1903, she met Magnus Hirschfeld, who later described the meeting several times in his writings. He mentioned her wearing a Parisian red silk evening dress, with laces worth more than 2000 franks. Paradeda frequented the local that Hirschfeld visited and was raising the interest of the local social circles, so Hirschfeld started the conversation with her.

Paradeda was described as a woman of many talents, including piano playing, cooking, and handcrafts such as hat decoration. She was also supposed to be a good conversationalist who stoked interest with her stories from Brazil or Paris, dispelling any initial doubt or distrust caused by her height or low voice. Many sources refer to her tall but very slender figure and her elegance in expensive fashion and accessories.

== Death circumstances ==
Shortly after meeting Hirschfeld, Paradeda travelled to Paris, where she was known as Comtesse de Paradeda, and surrounded herself with material goods, servants and invited people to her refined apartment. Somewhere in Paris she met a 'modest' (as described by Hirschfeld) German teacher named Edgar Töpfer, who came there to study French. On 28 October 1906, Paradeda left Paris and moved to Breslau as Töpfer's fiancée, meeting his friends and family and renting a new apartment. She was friendly with the landlord, who let her repaint the apartment and remodel it, and was called "Aunt Didi" by the landlord's daughter.

Despite everyday visits from her fiancé, Paradeda was very jealous of him and his friends, who distrusted and questioned her. Their private investigation of Paradeda's past found her stepfather, recently returned from Brazil to Germany, and that he had a stepson named Alfred, but not a stepdaughter named Alma. Paradeda threatened Töpfer with death in case of breaking the engagement. After finally breaking the engagement, he denounced his ex-fiancée to the police (one insight claims that the denouncement happened only after Paradeda attempted to break into his apartment). When the commissioner of criminal police arrived at Paradeda's apartment, the countess remained calm and serious, giving the police officer no reason to intervene. Nevertheless, Paradeda was distraught by the intervention enough to call her trusted doctor (who was indisposed and sent an assistant). Paradeda refused the assistant's order to undress and undergo a medical examination. On his insistence, she asked for a moment for herself and disappeared for a moment in another room. After a few minutes she came back, sat down in front of the doctor and, having already announced her readiness to be examined, suddenly fell on the ground, and within a minute, she was dying in violent convulsions. The commissioner who previously visited the apartment found a stale body and a completely confused physician, who examined the body, revealing it was physically male.

The story of a "male bride from Breslau" was published in newspapers worldwide, including the German language Indiana Tribüne in the USA and Poverty Bay Herald in New Zealand. Two books inspired by the countess' story were written: Mein Zimmerherr by Marie Römer, who claimed to be the landlord and to tell the true story, and the fictionalized, loosely inspired by the real events Tagebuch einer männlichen Braut (Diary of a male bride). Röhmer's book resembles newspaper articles in fragments, which makes her claims to be the landlord debatable.
