= Jalma Jurado =

Brazilian surgeon known for work on gender-affirming surgery

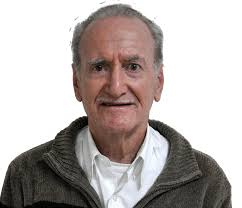
- Born: July 18, 1937; Indaiatuba, São Paulo, Brazil
- Died: May 8, 2022 (aged 84); Indaiatuba
- Education: University of São Paulo (USP)
- Scientific career
- Fields: Medicine, surgery

Jalma Jurado (July 18, 1937 – May 8, 2022) was a Brazilian plastic surgeon known for his work on gender-affirming surgery. Jurado earned his PhD in medicine from the University of São Paulo and worked for more than three decades as a professor of plastic surgery at the Faculty of Medicine of Jundiaí. He also served as the president of the Lions Club International of Indaiatuba, in the interior of São Paulo State. He is known as the doctor that performed the most gender-affirming surgeries in Brazil.

== Career ==
For decades, Dr. Jurado was part of the staff at the Faculty of Medicine of Jundiaí, where he was a head surgeon. Over the course of four decades, he was also involved with the Lions Clubs International, where he organized awareness-raising campaigns against skin cancer, HIV/AIDS, and for the environment.

Dr. Jurado became nationally known in Brazil for his pioneering work on gender-affirming care, particularly in the field of male-to-female gender-affirming surgery. Jurado developed his own technique in 1984, which he used in surgeries for more than 500 transgender women from both within and outside of Brazil. In addition to preserving many of the nerve endings that produce pleasure during sex, Jurado's technique lowered the risk of vaginal stenosis over time, reducing the need for dilation. This made it ideal for older transgender women and transgender women who have a less active sex life.

Dr. Jurado's publicly-known patients included women like sexologist Wal Torres and militant LGBT activist Maitê Schneider (for whom Dr. Jurado fixed problems stemming from an earlier surgery done by another doctor).

=== Surgeries in Brazil ===
In 1997, Dr. Jurado's surgery was legalized by the Conselho Federal de Medicina, paving the way for further surgeries in the country. A year later, Bianca Magro would be the first Brazilian transgender woman to undergo the procedure. Her surgery was completed at the State University of Campinas and is considered the first legal gender-affirming surgery in Brazil. In Brazil, the first male-to-female gender-affirming surgery had been performed in 1971 by Roberto Farina.

In a 2002 interview in the magazine Época, Dr. Jurado stated:

We did not change anything, we merely aligned sex with the brain.

In 2003, during the 18th Symposium of WPATH in Belgium, Dr. Jurado was given only five minutes to speak. Unfortunately, the time he was given was not enough for him to present his new surgical techniques.

On December 3, 2014, the Conselho Federal de Medicina ordered Dr. Jurado from performing gender-affirming surgeries. An earlier measure before the Conselho Regional de Medicina of São Paulo State had already ordered Dr. Jurado not to engage in any medical activity, but a later proceeding left the ban on gender-affirming surgeries in place. The Conselho Regional de Medicina of São Paulo State, having heard numerous complaints from Jurado's former patients, launched a disciplinary inquiry. The authorities decided to revoke Dr. Jurado's professional rights and he remained inactive after June 2015.

Dr. Jurado died on May 8, 2022, in Indaiatuba.
