= João W. Nery =

Brazilian writer, psychologist, and activist

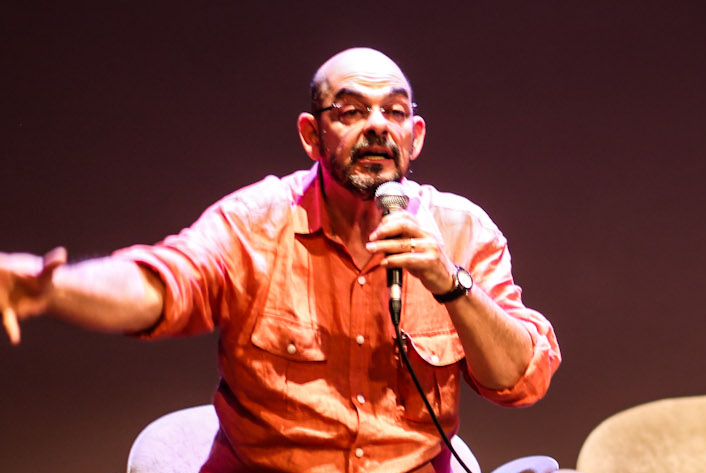
- Born: 12 February 1950; Rio de Janeiro, Brazil
- Died: 26 October 2018 (aged 68); Niterói, RJ, Brazil
- Occupations: Writer, psychologist
- Years active: 1977–2018

João W. Nery (12 February 1950 – 26 October 2018), was a Brazilian writer, psychologist, and LGBT activist. He was the first transgender man to have undergone sex-change surgery in Brazil; Dr. Roberto Farina performed the surgery in 1977.

== Biography ==
Born in 1950 in the city of Rio de Janeiro, João was the third of four children. His father was an aviator and his mother was a primary school teacher. The family lived in a large, lively house, but João had a sad childhood, being harassed in the playground and at school. According to his autobiography, he did not understand why he was treated as a girl, nor why he was not encouraged to pursue a profession in the future that was typically male.

As a child he was ashamed of his body and had no vanity, going around unkempt and wearing loose clothes that did not mark the body, and receiving sexist nicknames from schoolmates. When he was 9 years old, his mother took him to a psychologist, trying to understand why he insisted on being treated as a boy, and the psychologist's conclusion frustrated him even more, because according to her João was trying to imitate his father, as the middle child. Thus his mother should force him to wear girls' clothes and reinforce feminine behavior whenever João behaved that way.

At the age of 13 he began to dedicate himself to diving. It was an attempt to gain muscle mass, but also to increase his self-esteem. He participated in the national championship in São Paulo, competing for the Troféu Brasil Arthur Buzin. Competing on the one-meter springboard, in the youth category, for Fluminense Club, João performed four dives from the compulsory series and won the national champion title. João continued diving until the age of 16, winning a total of 29 medals in women's competitions.

His father ended up exiled in Uruguay in 1964 for three years, and the family had to divide the children among relatives' homes when his mother went to stay with him for a few months in the same year. João, then 15, stayed at the house of his aunt Estela in an old four-bedroom mansion while attending school in Tijuca. With his father without a salary and in exile, he was declared dead so that his wife could receive a widow's pension, and the family's financial situation worsened greatly. Entering adolescence was not an easy period, as feminine attributes began to appear and João felt that he did not fit into that body.

In Uruguay, while spending a few months on vacation with his father, João met Darcy Ribeiro and his wife Berta Gleizer Ribeiro, with whom he learned about anthropology, archaeology and sociology. His father would only return to Brazil when João was 17, but he was never able to fly again.

=== University ===
At 19 he enrolled in the faculty of psychology, where he came into contact with theories about sexuality, reading about human sexual behavior and its variations determined by culture and society. In the 1970s, unisex fashion was an ally for João, who could make his appearance more ambiguous without causing strangeness among people. He became a class representative, but as the country was under dictatorship, the university closed the student union. An exceptional law, Decree number 477, charged João with "attacking national security in the university", which could have removed him from classes for up to five years. A lawyer defended him without charge and managed to obtain his acquittal.

The situation at home became unbearable. Although he loved his mother, João wanted a place of his own and began working as a taxi driver after his university classes. It was during this period of financial independence that he assumed a male gender identity. The boyfriend of a friend, who was a plastic surgeon, reduced his breasts, but for medical ethics could not remove them entirely.

A college colleague recommended him to the university rectorate so he could teach classes, after seeing the precarious conditions in which he lived, without money to pay rent. As a professor he gained intellectual prestige and came into contact with studies and theories that could help him understand what was happening with his own identity. Nery became an LGBTQ rights activist, especially of the trans population. A few years later his long-term relationship ended and João was left alone. At the university, however, his career took off. In 2018 he received the title of Doctor Honoris Causa for his activism and work from the Federal University of Mato Grosso, becoming the first trans man in the world to receive such a title. He was invited to congresses and symposia and began to study anthropology.

=== Transgender identity ===
In 1975 he traveled for a month to Europe. With little money, he traveled across the continent by train, usually on night trains where travel was cheaper. It was in a bookstore in Paris that João found a scientific magazine called Sexualité. One of the articles was by a doctor working with sex reassignment surgeries, carried out successfully in some countries. Although it referred specifically to trans women, he reported that the technique could also be adapted for trans men, citing pioneering countries in the technique such as the United States, England, Sweden and Denmark, which recognized the need for identity change after surgery.

He returned to Brazil shortly afterward, beginning a master's degree in psychology and teaching at three colleges. Sex reassignment surgery was not performed in Brazil, where it was considered mutilation. A psychologist colleague referred him to an endocrinologist at the Hospital Moncorvo Filho, who explained the differences between transgender identity and homosexuality. There João entered the screening process for clinical examinations with a view to surgical treatment.

Encouraged by the possibility of surgery, his family opposed it, especially his father. His mother began begging him not to undergo the surgery, saying she would accept a "homosexual daughter, but not one without any identity". The report on which his surgery depended, however, was denied by the psychiatrist, who was not convinced that transgender identity existed. On the suggestion of his doctor he sought another psychiatrist who issued a favorable opinion. The surgery took place in a clinic in São Paulo, performed clandestinely without a medical record. Hormone therapy began shortly afterward, but this surgery did not remove the uterus and ovaries, and the surgeon did not know who could perform it.

João became a test subject for treatments, since in Brazil at the time there were no protocols or studies regarding the effects of hormone therapy, and he became a major critic of the Brazilian health system because of its gaps and lack of assistance to transgender patients. It was an obstetrician and gynecologist known to the family who indicated a doctor willing to perform the remaining surgeries.

=== Final years and death ===
João became an activist for LGBT rights, especially for the transgender population. A bill by deputies Jean Wyllys and Erika Kokay bears his name. Based on Argentina's Gender Identity Law, the proposal guarantees the right to recognition of gender identity for all transgender people in Brazil, without the need for judicial authorization, medical or psychological reports, surgeries or hormone therapies.

In August 2017 João discovered he had lung cancer. A smoker since the age of 15, he underwent chemotherapy. In September 2018 Nery revealed on social media that the cancer had reached the brain, and he died in Niterói on 26 October 2018 at the age of 68.

== Legacy ==
His book Viagem Solitária – Memórias de um Transexual 30 Anos Depois recounts his journey discovering transsexuality, the treatments and the acceptance of friends and family. The book served as inspiration for the character Ivan in the telenovela A Força do Querer, written by Glória Perez and broadcast on TV Globo in 2017.

Nery's trajectory earned him a book in his honor entitled Estudos sobre gênero: identidades, discurso e educação – homenagem a João W. Nery, compiled by university professors Jesus, Carbonieri and Nigro, presenting several trans authors in its chapters and discussing identity and discourse theories in education.

In 2024 the Federal Council of Psychology created the João W. Nery Award: "Práticas de Promoção de Cuidado, Respeito e Dignidade das Pessoas Trans" to recognize and reward psychology professionals who stand out in supporting trans people, promoting inclusion and carrying out work that contributes to building a more just and equal society for the community. It is a way of valuing the work of psychologists who act in accordance with the principles of the CFP and contribute to creating a more inclusive and welcoming environment for the trans community.

A bill by congressman Jean Wyllys and congresswoman Erika Kokay bears his name. Based on the Argentine Identity and Gender Law, the project guarantees the right to recognize the gender identity of all transgender people in Brazil, without the need for judicial authorization, medical or psychological reports, surgery or hormone treatment.

== Bibliography ==
- Erro de pessoa: Joana ou João?, Rio de Janeiro, Editora Record, 1984.
- Viagem solitária: memórias de um transexual 30 anos depois, São Paulo, Leya Brasil, 2012.
- Vidas trans: a coragem de existir (together with Amara Moira, Márcia Rocha, and T. Brant), Bauru, Leya Brasil, 2017.
  - Vidas Trans: A luta de transgêneros brasileiros em busca de seu espaço social. Astral Cultural. 2022. New Edition.
- Velhice transviada: Memórias e reflexões, Objetiva, 2019. Posthumous publication.
