= Indiana Tribüne =

German speaking newspaper in the US

The Indiana Tribune was a German-language daily newspaper published in Indiana, US.

== General ==
In August 1878, Louis D. Hild founded a new pro-Republican, German-language, four-page weekly newspaper, the Indiana Tribune. The circulation was originally 800 copies. In April 1882, the newspaper was purchased by the Tribune Company. The Tribune had a four-page daily circulation of 3,000 in 1882. On 7 March 1907, the publisher combined the two newspapers Indiana Tribune and Daily Telegraph into a single newspaper titled the Indianapolis Telegraph and Tribune. On 1 June 1918, the publishing house closed.

== Other German-language newspapers in Indiana ==
Pro-Republican

- Free Press of Indiana (1853–66).
- Indiana German Newspaper (1874–77)

Pro-Democratic

- Indiana Volksblatt (1848–75)
- Daily Telegraph (1865-1907)
