= Tibira do Maranhão =

First Brazilian who was executed due to homosexuality

- Died: 1614; Maranhão, Brazil
- Citizenship: Tupinambá people
- Known for: Possible first execution for sodomy in Brazil

Tibira do Maranhão is the modern name of a Tupinambá native of Maranhão, executed in 1614, and recently identified by some as a possible case of execution related to homosexuality.

== Events ==
In 1614, two years after the arrival of French colonizers in Northern Brazil, an unnamed indigenous man was sentenced to death. He attempted to escape the charge, and fled into the woods for several days, but was re-captured by French authorities. Before his execution, the indigenous was baptized by Louis de Pézieux, leader of the French colony, in the name of Saint Dismas, strapped to a cannon, which was fired, killing him. His last words were:

"I'm going to die, I'll never see them again, I'm no longer afraid of Jurupari because I'm a child of God, I do not have to provide fire, flour, water or any tool to travel beyond mountains, where you think you are dancing your fathers. Give me a little petum, however, so that I may die joyfully, with the firm word and without the fear that greases my stomach."

This indigenous man was "one of the first people in the New World to be so executed," according to Huw Lemmey and Ben Miller.

== Modern culture ==
In 1993, Brazilian anthropologist and gay activist Luiz Mott reinterpreted the episode as a homophobic execution, naming the indigenous "Tibira", after a tupi-guarani term for sodomite. In 2014 he started a campaign to get Tibira canonized as a queer saint and recognized as a martyr.

On December 5, 2016, a monument commemorating "Tibira" was dedicated in Maranhão, Praia Grande, during the State Week of Human Rights.
