= Roberto Farina Case =

Brazilian legal proceeding regarding gender-affirming surgery

Case of Roberto Farina
- Court: Conselho Federal de Medicina

The Roberto Farina Case was a legal proceeding that attracted international attention to Brazil during the late 1970s. The case stemmed from the first male-to-female gender-affirming surgery performed in Brazil in the city of São Paulo.

Dr. Farina was sentenced to two years in prison but was subsequently absolved after the Brazilian courts concluded that gender-affirming surgery was the only way to alleviate gender dysphoria in Farina's patient, Waldirene Nogueira. Farina was supported by a team from Hospital das Clínicas da Universidade de São Paulo, who pushed for surgical intervention as a therapeutic solution for the patient.

== Background ==
In 1969, Waldirene Nogueira, a transgender manicurist and hairstylist, left Lins and went to Hospital das Clínicas da Universidade de São Paulo to seek treatment for her gender dysphoria. She was initially seen by Dorina Epps, and went on to attend weekly therapy sessions, where she was diagnosed with gender dysphoria and told that gender-affirming surgery might be a viable treatment for her. At first, the treatment team considered taking Nogueira to the United States for the surgery. However, Roberto Farina, a professor of plastic surgery, decided to learn the procedure and perform it on Nogueira. Farina consulted relevant medical literature and performed tests on cadavers until, in December 1971, he successfully completed Nogueira's surgery. Nogueira's surgery was the first gender-affirming surgery performed on a transgender woman in Brazil. Nogueira's surgery was done free of charge, and she expressed satisfaction with the procedure, saying:

"My life before the operation was an unbearable martyrdom because I had to deal with genitalia that were never mine. After the operation, I became free forever—thanks to God and to Dr. Roberto Farina—of the execrable organs that had made my life hell, and I felt so relieved that I felt like I had new wings for life."

In 1975, Nogueira requested a name and gender change on her civil registration, which was denied by the Court of Justice of São Paulo. The request generated significant publicity, as medical and legal professionals had not anticipated such a surgery and which was, at the time, illegal. As a result, the Brazilian authorities opened an investigation into both Farina and Nogueira.

In 1976, the Ministério Público do Estado de São Paulo subpoenaed Farina, asking him to provide the names and addresses of all of his surgical patients. Farina had publicized his surgeries during a medical conference, but refused to turn over the information. During this time, Nogueira was made to submit to many invasive procedures, including a nude photo shoot and gynecological exam that measured the size of her vaginal canal to determine whether she had been born a woman. In an attempt to avoid the examinations, Noguiera applied for a writ of habeas corpus, but it was denied. The exam was inconclusive and did not find any anomaly. The result, while surprising, did not stop the ongoing judicial process. The prosecutor, Messias Piva, said that the judges should not be moved by the "sensationalism" of the doctors and classified Nogueira as "mentally ill." The male reproductive organs from Nogueira's surgery were considered "physical assets" and property of the state.

Two years later, on 6 September 1978, Nogueira was determined to be a victim by default, and Farina was sentenced to two years of confinement for having violated Article 129, § 2, III of the Penal Code of Brazil. The Conselho Federal de Medicina brought the case, accusing Farina of grave bodily harm, and the presiding judge was Adalberto Spagnuolo. By this time, Farina had performed many such operations, including on João W. Nery, the first transgender man to receive gender-affirming surgery in Brazil. (Note: While João W. Nery was the first trans man in Brazil to complete gender-affirming surgery, an intersex man named Mario da Silva was the first to have the surgery done in 1959.)

=== Reaction of the Scientific Community ===
The case garnered international attention and provoked fierce debate within the international scientific community; dozens of researchers from many countries sent letters in support of Dr. Farina. John Money of the Johns Hopkins School of Medicine wrote:

"It would be an error for the judicial authorities in Brazil to prosecute Dr. Farina for following an internationally-respected and accepted medical and surgical procedure."

Robert Rubin, of the David Geffen School of Medicine at UCLA, wrote:

"In no other country in the world where this type of treatment is done has the state ever accused a doctor of criminal conduct. This is a damaging setback to Brazil's reputation."

=== Opinions and acquittal ===
on 17 October 1978, Heleno Fragoso issued an opinion on the case, saying that Dr. Farina acted strictly within the limits of the law, doing no harm, even if he had committed an error in recommending surgery. One year later, on 6 November 1979, the majority of the 5th Chamber of the Court of Justice of São Paulo voted to uphold the ruling on appeal and absolved Dr. Farina. The Court said:

"A doctor who, through gender-affirming surgery, seeks to cure [sic] or reduce the physical or mental suffering of a transsexual person, does not do harm. Such surgery is not prohibited by law, nor by the Code of Medical Ethics."

The absence of intent to harm and the unique circumstances weighed in favor of Dr. Farina, whose intervention was always aimed at alleviating Nogueira's dysphoria. Article 23 of the Penal Code also immunizes against criminal liability when one acts in strict compliance with the law. Thus, a doctor who effects the wishes of transgender person does not violate their bodily integrity or health.

The court also inferred that there was no harm from the penectomy because the penis was already impotent from feminizing hormone therapy.

== Aftermath ==
In 1979, before the proceedings had concluded, federal deputy José de Castro Coimbra introduced Bill No. 1,909 to the National Congress of Brazil, which would have provided for the protection of doctors in operations involving destruction of body parts. Although passed through the Congress, President João Figueiredo vetoed the bill.

Gender-affirming surgeries became more prevalent over time and were performed by many doctors, often secretly in private clinics. According to Trip magazine, 270 gender-affirming surgeries were performed in Brazil between 1972 and 1997, all of them clandestinely. Even so, there are records of authorized gender-affirming surgeries from this period. On 25 May 1995, for instance, plastic surgeon Antonio Lino de Araújo performed a gender-affirming surgery on 22-year-old Valéria José dos Santos at the regional hospital of Asa Norte in Brasília. Upon learning that the procedure had been performed, Emy Rezende, the director of the hospital, called the police and the Regional Counsel of Medicine of the Federal District and notified them. Dr. Lino de Araújo was able to avoid liability because he managed to prove that he had obtained a favorable opinion from the Conselho Federal de Medicina authorizing the procedure. Similarly, in 1998, the Conselho Federal de Medicina approved, on an emergency basis, a surgery for a trans person in Florianópolis. According to gynaecologist Pacheco Motta, who performed the procedure, the surgery was extremely necessary, as the patient had already undergone several secret surgeries, which had left them disfigured.

The Conselho Federal de Medicina did not recognize and authorize gender-affirming surgeries for all transgender people until publication of CFM Resolution No. 1,482 of 1997, when it officially authorized hospitals to perform them. The resolution was subsequently updated in 2002, 2010, and 2019. The first trans woman to undergo gender-affirming surgery after the resolution legalizing the procedure was Bianca Magro at the Hospital das Clínicas da Unicamp in Campinas on 8 April 1998.

In 2008, the Sistema Único de Saúde (SUS) approved many gender-affirming surgical procedures, including a neocolpovulvoplasty (for trans women).

In 2018, the Supreme Federal Court ruled that transgender people, transsexual people, and transvestites have the right to change their name and gender on the civil registration without having to undergo gender-affirming surgery.

In 2019, the SUS allowed metoidioplasty (for transgender men).

On 10 February 2021, José Carlos Martins e Claudio Eduardo Pereira de Souza at the Santo Antônio Hospital in Blumenau performed near-simultaneous surgeries on two identical twin sisters, Sofia Albuquerck and Mayla Phoebe. The procedure was considered groundbreaking.

== See also ==
- LGBT history in Brazil
- Transgender health care
- Legal status of transgender people
- Jalma Jurado
