= List of LGBTQ-related observances =

The following are lists of internationally recognized and domestically recognized LGBTQIA+ awareness periods, i.e. awareness days, weeks and months that focus on LGBTQIA+ matters.

== Internationally recognized ==
Name	Date	Year Started	Notes
Agender Pride Day	19 May	2017	A day celebrated internationally to promote awareness of agender individuals.
Aromantic Spectrum Awareness Week	The first full week following Valentine's Day (14 February), beginning on Sunday	2014	A week to promote information and awareness about aromantic spectrum identities ("an identity within the LGBTQIA+ community in which someone experiences little to no romantic attraction.") and the issues they face. This week was first recognized from 10 to 17 November 2014, under the name Aromantic Awareness Week. In 2015, it was moved to late February and the name was changed to Aromantic Spectrum Awareness Week, to be more inclusive of all arospec identities.
Aromantic Visibility Day	5 June	2023	A day to promote the visibility of aromantic people.
International Asexuality Day	6 April	2021	IAD is a coordinated worldwide campaign promoting asexuality as a valid sexual orientation. The four themes of IAD are Advocacy, Celebration, Education and Solidarity.
Ace Week	Last full week in October	2010	Week to promote awareness of those who do not feel sexual attraction to anyone. It was founded by Sara Beth Brooks in 2010.
Bisexual Awareness Week	16–22 September	2014	Also referred to as BiWeek and Bisexual+ Awareness Week.
Celebrate Bisexuality Day	23 September	1999	Also referred to as Bisexual Pride Day, CBD, Bisexual Pride, and Bi Visibility Day.
Genderfluid Visibility Week	17-24 October	2021	Also referred to as Genderfluid Week, Fluid Week or Genderfluid Awareness Week.
International Day Against Homophobia, Biphobia and Transphobia	17 May	2005	The main purpose of the 17 May mobilizations is to raise awareness of violence, discrimination, abuse, and repression of LGBT communities worldwide.
International Day of Pink	The second Wednesday in April	2007	The International Day of Pink is a worldwide anti-bullying and anti-homophobia event where participants are encouraged to wear or display a pink shirt, echoing a mass gesture of solidarity with a student subjected to homophobic bullying in Cambridge, Nova Scotia, Canada in 2007.
International Day to End Conversion Therapy	7 January	2025	International Day to End Conversion Therapy (IDECT) is an annual observance held on January 7 that seeks to raise awareness about the harms associated with conversion therapy practices worldwide. The day highlights the resilience of survivors, amplifies their experiences, and promotes advocacy for the global elimination of such practices. It also calls on policymakers, allies, and communities to support affirming, evidence-based care for 2SLGBTQIA+ individuals. It was started by the nonprofits C.T. Survivors Connect & Conversion Therapy Survivor Network.
Drag Day	16 July	2009	A day that aims to celebrate and recognize drag art all around the world.
International Lesbian Day	8 October	1980 (NZ) or 1990 (Aus)	An annual day celebrating lesbian culture that originated in New Zealand and Australia, but is now celebrated internationally.
International LGBTQ Pride Day	28 June		Celebrates LGBTQ pride. It is considered to be Stonewall riots' anniversary.
Intersex Awareness Day	26 October	1996	Celebrated in October to commemorate the first intersex protest, which took place in Boston, Massachusetts.
Intersex Day of Remembrance	8 November	2005	A day designed to raise awareness of the issues faced by intersex people. It marks the birthday of Herculine Barbin, a French intersex person. The event began as Intersex Solidarity Day, following an invitation issued by Joëlle-Circé Laramée, the then Canadian spokeswoman for Organization Intersex International.
Lesbian Visibility Day	26 April	2008	Annual day to celebrate, recognize, and bring visibility to lesbians.
National Coming Out Day	11 October	1988	A day to celebrate the act of "coming out", i.e. when an LGBT person decides to publicly share their gender identities or sexual orientation. National Coming out Day was founded in the United States by gay rights activists Robert Eichberg and Jean O'Leary on 1988 in Washington, DC, United States. By 1990 it was being celebrated in all 50 states. Although still named "National Coming Out Day", it is currently observed around the world, in countries such as Canada, Germany, The Netherlands, Switzerland, and Australia also on 11 October, and in the United Kingdom on 12 October.
Dyke Week	9 August	2022	An annual day to promote Dyke history, culture and dyke communities. Inspired by Dyke Day in LA or Dyke Weekend in Japan. Established by HER app in 2022.
Non-Binary Awareness Week	The week, starting Sunday/Monday, surrounding 14 July	2020	A week dedicated to those who do not fit within the traditional gender binary, i.e. those who do not exclusively identify as a man or a woman, or who may identify as both a man and a woman, or may fall outside of these categories altogether. Promoted on Twitter as @NBWeek.
Non-Binary People's Day	14 July	2012	An annual day to celebrate and bring visibility to people who are non-binary in the LGBT+ community. The date is the precise midpoint between International Men's Day and International Women's Day.
Pansexual & Panromantic Awareness Day	24 May	2015	An annual day to promote awareness of, and celebrate, pansexual and panromantic identities.
International Pronouns Day	The third Wednesday in October	2018	An annual event that seeks to make sharing, respecting and educating about personal pronouns commonplace.
Trans Awareness Month	November	2017	A month to celebrate transgender and gender nonconforming communities and to raise awareness for this community through education and advocacy activities.
Trans Awareness Week	13-19 November	2017	A week to educate about transgender and gender non-conforming people, and the issues associated with their transition and/or identity.
Transgender Day of Remembrance	20 November	1999	Day to memorialize those who have been murdered as a result of transphobia.
Trans Day of Visibility	31 March	2009	A day to celebrate the trans community in a positive light, celebrating their lives and cultural achievements. This observance date was founded in 2009 by transgender activist Rachel Crandall Crocker (Michigan, United States), the head of Transgender Michigan, as a reaction to the lack of a day celebrating transgender people.
Trans Parent Day	The first Sunday in November	2009	A day that celebrates life and the love between transgender parents and their children, and between parents and their transgender children.
World AIDS Day	1 December	1988	Day to raise awareness of the ongoing AIDS pandemic and mourning those who have died of the disease.
Zero Discrimination Day	1 March	2014	A United Nations (UN) recognized day promoting equality before the law, and in practice, throughout all of the member countries of the UN. The UN first celebrated this day on 1 March 2014, launched as part of the previous year's Zero Discrimination campaign run by UNAIDS on World AIDS Day (1 December 2013).
Gay Uncles Day (or "Guncles Day")	2nd Sunday in August	2016	
Trans Flag Day	19 August	2014	This day honors the Transgender flag, which was designed by Monica Helms and donated to the Smithsonian National Museum of American History on August 19, 2014.
International Gay Men’s Day	6 September	2026	Created specifically to celebrate gay men as same-sex attracted males based on biological sex.

== Domestically recognized ==
=== Australia ===
Name	Date	Year Started	Notes
LGBTQ History Month	October	2016	Based on a similarly named awareness period in the United States, this is a month encouraging openness and education about LGBTIQ history and rights.
Mardi Gras Parade	The first Saturday of March	1978	A day in the annual Mardi Gras festival held in the Australia state of New South Wales which features a pride parade, commemorating the first rally in 1978 where numerous participants were arrested by the police. The current Mardi Gras Parade maintains the original rallies' political flavour, with many of the marching groups and floats promoting LGBTIQ rights issues and/or themes.
Wear it Purple Day	The final Friday of August	2010	A day to foster supportive, safe, empowering and inclusive environments for rainbow young people. The day was co-founded by Katherine Hudson and Scott Williams. Comparable days exist in a number of other countries, including the Netherlands (Purple Friday) and the United States (Spirit Day).

=== Brazil ===
Name	Date	Year Started	Notes
National Trans Visibility Day	January 29	2004	A day celebrated annually on 29 January and celebrates, since 2004, the pride, existence and resistance of the trans and travesti community within the LGBTQ+ movement in Brazil.
Trans Men and Transmasculine People Day	February 20	2015	Commemorative date annually celebrating transmasculinity and trans men in Brazil.
National Gay Pride Day	March 25		A day started around 2020 to celebrate gay pride, specially gay men pride, in Brazil.
National Trans Pride Day	May 15	2017	Celebrating 1992 travesti and trans movement of Rio de Janeiro. The activity became part of the policies developed by the Senate administration — under the Senate Gender and Race Equity Plan for the 2026-2027 biennium.
National Lesbian Pride Day	August 19	2003	Referring to the 1983 occupation of Ferro's Bar by Grupo Ação Lésbica Feminista, denouncing the violence lived in the place.
National Lesbian Visibility Day	August 29	2003	An established date in Brazil created by Brazilian lesbian activists and dedicated to the date on which the 1st National Lesbian Seminar - Senale took place, on 29 August 1996.

=== Canada ===
Name	Date	Year Started	Notes
LGBTQ History Month	October	1994	Based on a similarly named awareness period in the United States, this is a month encouraging openness and education about LGBTQ history and rights.

=== Chile ===
Name	Date	Year Started	Notes
Lesbian Visibility Day	9 July	2015	Commemorates the anniversary of Mónica Briones' murder, the first documented act of lesbophobia in Chile.

=== India ===
Name	Date	Year Started	Notes
Indian Coming Out Day	2 July	2012	A commemoration of the Delhi High Court's decriminalisation of same-sex sexual activity by reading down Section 377 of the Indian Penal Code (for the first time) in 2009.

=== Ireland ===
Name	Date	Year Started	Notes
Irish Marriage Referendum	22 May	2015	A commemoration of Ireland legalizing same-sex marriage through a plebiscite.

=== Japan ===
Name	Date	Year Started	Notes
Dyke Weekend	March	1994	A semi-annual weekend event of workshops, seminars, guest speakers and sports run by volunteer group of a queer woman to come together and share ideas, build new friendships and strengthen community.

=== Netherlands ===
Name	Date	Year Started	Notes
Purple Friday	The second Friday of December	2010	A day aimed at reducing bullying and increasing inclusivity in schools, using a purple theme in which people are encouraged to wear purple clothes. In December 2010, COC Nederland named the second Friday of December "Paarse Vrijdag" (Dutch: Purple Friday). The Gender Sexuality Alliance Network has continued to celebrate its observance annually since then. Comparable days exist in a number of other countries, including Australia (Wear it Purple Day) and the United States (Spirit Day).

=== New Zealand ===
Name	Date	Year Started	Notes
Schools Pride Week	The second week of June	2019	This week is aimed at high schools and allows students to celebrate diversity. It is championed by the charity InsideOut and has links to the UK-based and school-led diversity week

=== Ukraine ===
Name	Date	Year Started	Notes
Day of Remembrance of Homosexuals in Ukraine (victims of the totalitarian Soviet regime)	12 December	2006	This day is celebrated as an important date to honor those who suffered from systematic repression and discrimination during the Soviet period. On December 12, 1991, the Verkhovna Rada of Ukraine passed a law that decriminalized voluntary homosexual relations between adult men.

=== United Kingdom ===
Name	Date	Year Started	Notes
LGBTQ History Month	February	2005	Celebrated throughout February since 2005. Founded by Schools OUT UK - The LGBT+ Education Charity.
Trans+ History Week	May 6	2024	Observed the week starting with 6 May.

=== United States ===
Name	Date	Year started	Notes
Bisexual Health Awareness Month	March	2014	A month to raise awareness about the bisexual community's social, economic, and health disparities, advocate for resources, and inspire actions to improve bi people's well-being. Promoted on social media through #BiHealthMonth.
Day of Silence	The second Friday in April	1996	A student-orientated day to end the silencing effect of anti-LGBT bias. Initially created by then-student Maria Pulzetti, the first event was organized by students at University of Virginia in 1996. It is currently organized by Glisten. In 1997, one year after the day's creation, it went national, with over 100 institutions participating. Whilst there has been some participation from other countries, including New Zealand and Singapore, as of 2021 it is still categorized as a "national student-led demonstration".
Harvey Milk Day	22 May	2010	Celebrated to honor Harvey Milk, assassinated politician, on his birthday. It is celebrated officially in California, Milk's home state.
Sapphic Visibility Day	9 April	2024	Celebrated to promote the term "sapphic" as an identity for many women, nonbinary, trans and gender nonconforming people.
HIV Long-Term Survivors Awareness Day	5 June	2014	A day to highlight the resilience and strengths of people living longest with HIV and AIDS, while pointing out the challenges facing this population and demanding action to improve their quality of life. It was started by Tez Anderson, founder of Let's Kick ASS (LKA) and promoted on social media using #HLTSAD.
LGBTQ+ business week	Fall/Winter	2023	A week to celebrate and support LGBTQ+ businesses and raise awareness of economic issues faced by the community. In 2024, it will be celebrated the week of December 2nd.
LGBTQ History Month	October	1994	It was declared a national history month by President Barack Obama in 2009. The month was created with the intent to encourage openness and education about LGBTQ history and rights.
Pride Month	June		June is celebrated as Pride in honor of the Stonewall Riots, though Pride events occur all year round. It also marks the month that same-sex marriage was legalized in the United States.
Pulse Night of Remembrance	12 June	2017	Annual day of US remembrance for the loss of 49 LGBT people in the Pulse Nightclub shooting in Orlando, Florida.
Spirit Day	The third Thursday in October	2010	Support for LGBTQ+ youth who are the victims of bullying, as well as to honor LGBTQ+ victims of bullying-related suicide. Comparable days exist in a number of other countries, including Australia (Wear it Purple Day) and the Netherlands (Purple Friday).
Stonewall Riots Anniversary	28 June	1969	Anniversary of the Stonewall Riots, a reaction to the NYPD raid of the Stonewall Inn. This initial event was a force for LGBT political activism, and started the United States and International LGBT rights movement. The world's first pride parade occurred on the 1st anniversary (28 June 1970). It is also known as International LGBT Pride Day.
Transgender History Month	August	2024	Recognized in California following the State Legislature's passage of House Resolution 57 on 6 September 2023.

== See also ==
- List of LGBTQ events
