= Midsumma Festival =

Annual LGBTQIA+ event in Melbourne, Australia

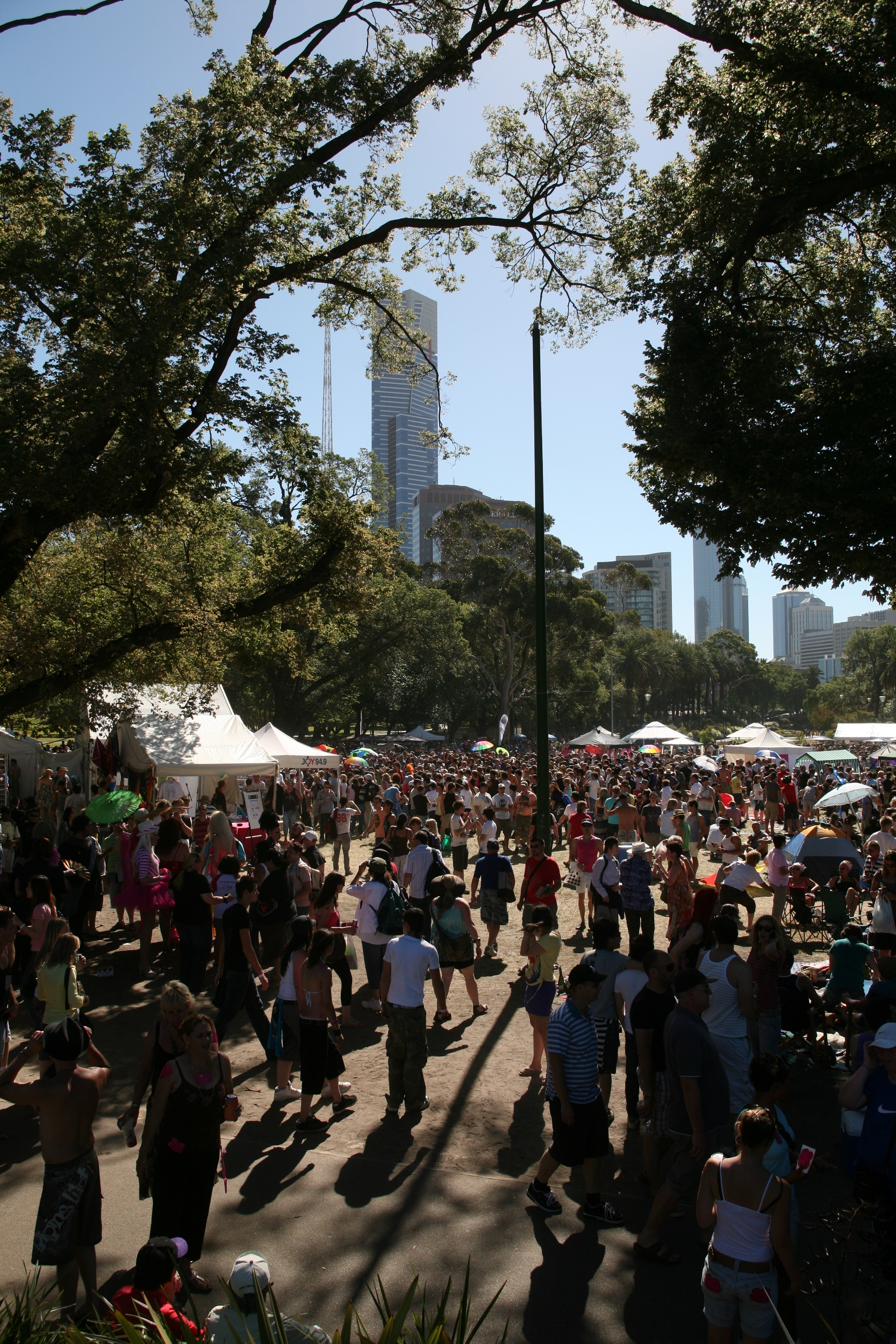
- Carnival crowd at Alexandra Garden Carnival crowd at Alexandra Garden 2010
- Genre: LGBT festival
- Locations: Melbourne, Australia
- Founded: 1989
- Website: www.midsumma.org.au

Midsumma Festival is a celebration of LGBTQIA+ arts and cultures held annually for 22 days over January and February in Melbourne, Australia.

The Victorian government has given Midsumma Festival funding. In 2018 it was given $600,000 for 3 years.

== History and background ==
The festival began as a one-week celebration of LGBTQIA+ pride in 1989.

=== Lesbian Festival and Conference ===
In 1988, the members of the Melbourne lesbian community started organising the first Lesbian Festival in Australia. Smaller groups were established to organise a variety of exhibitions, sports days, theatre events, a market, and a Lesbian Film Festival. The inaugural Lesbian Festival was held from 10 until 20 January 1990. A number of events and exhibitions were held at the Footscray Community Arts Centre, and the Standing Strong music concert was held at the Dallas Brooks Hall, featuring Judy Small, Mahinārangi Tocker from New Zealand, Deborah Cheetham, American singer-songwriter Alix Dobkin, and others. Indigenous Australian playwright Eva Johnson's specially commissioned play What Do They Call Me? was directed by Venetia Guillot and performed by Johnson at the Guild Theatre at the University of Melbourne. Films at the Lesbian Film Festival at the Grierson Theatre and the State Film Centre (now ACMI). The Lesbian Conference was held at Melbourne University between 26 and 29 January, attended by more than 1000 women. Spaces for Koori and migrant women were provided, and over A$5,000 was raised for the Aboriginal Community Elders Services to help fund a new care facility for Aboriginal Elders in Brunswick East. Films shown there were not censored. The 1991 a Lesbian Conference took place at University of Technology Sydney in July of that year, with festival events at various locations around Sydney. In 1992, a third festival was planned for around a month late in the year, beginning on International Lesbian Day and ending on Melbourne Cup Day.

== Description ==
Although the primary festival is held in the summer, Midsumma works year-round to provide artists, social changers, and culture makers with support and tools to create, present, and promote their work. Midsumma is an open-access festival. The program is made up of diverse art forms and genres, including visual arts, live music, theatre, spoken word, cabaret, film, parties, sport, social events, and public forums.

Midsumma's visual arts program features exhibitions in and around Melbourne from local, national and international LGBTQIA+ artists. The festival's performing arts program includes musicals, theatre, cabaret, film, spoken word, music events, and dance parties, largely produced by local community members.

The festival attracts over 240,000 people each year.

=== Midsumma Carnival ===
Midsumma Carnival is held during the event's opening weekend and is traditionally held at the Alexandra Gardens. The main stage includes entertainment from the upcoming festival program to showcase and promote later events. The day is brought to a close with the T Dance, a dance party organised by Midsumma.

=== Open-access events ===
The majority of Midsumma Festival events are within the umbrella events program, which are created, produced and funded by independent third parties who pay fees for inclusion in the Midsumma Festival.

In 2022 and 2023 there were approximately 200 events, which included programming for arts education, a pride march, all ages street party, photo competition and carnival events.

== Governance ==
Midsumma Festival Inc. is an incorporated association, chaired by Judy Small. Karen Bryant is CEO.

== Gallery ==
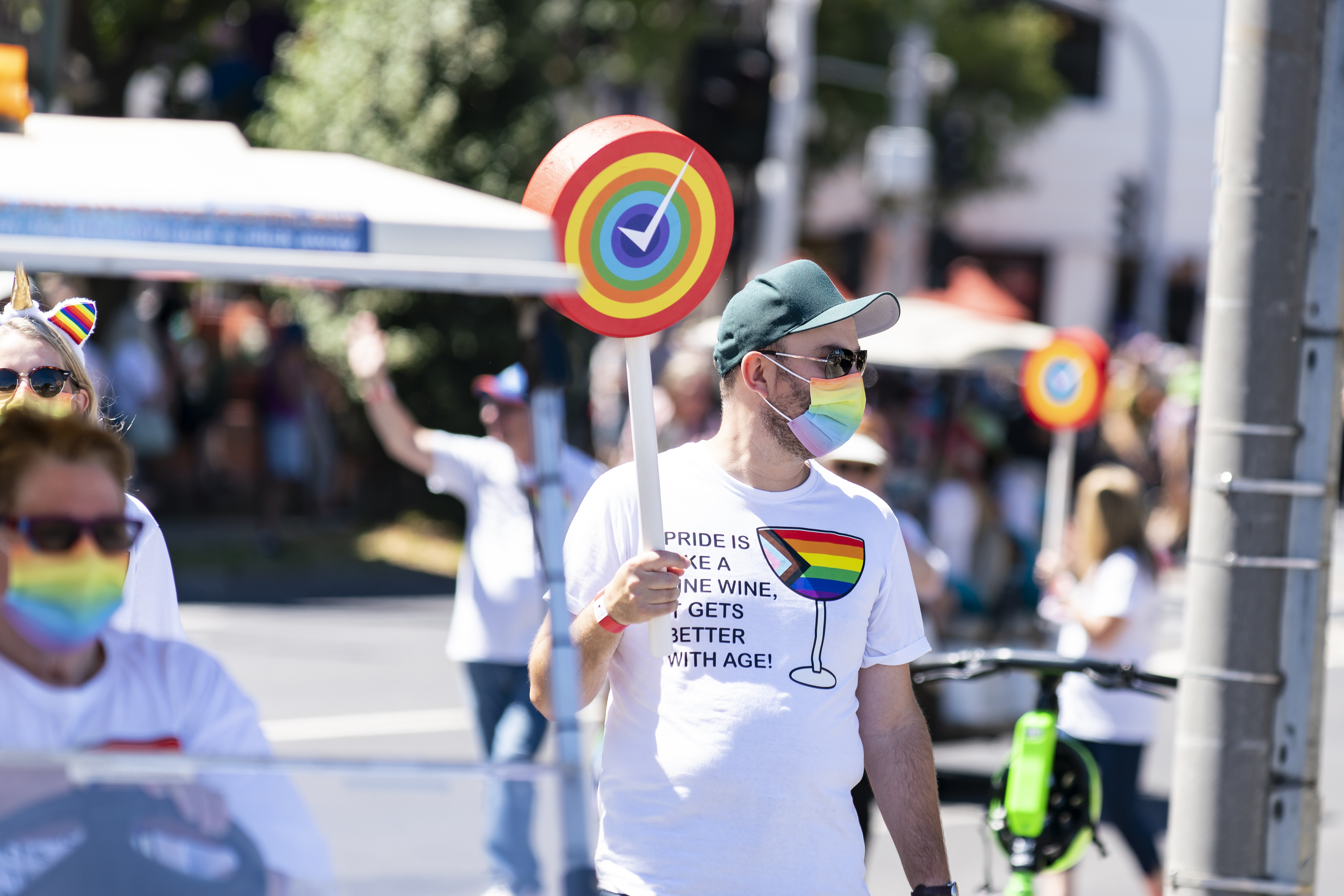
Midsumma Pride March 2022

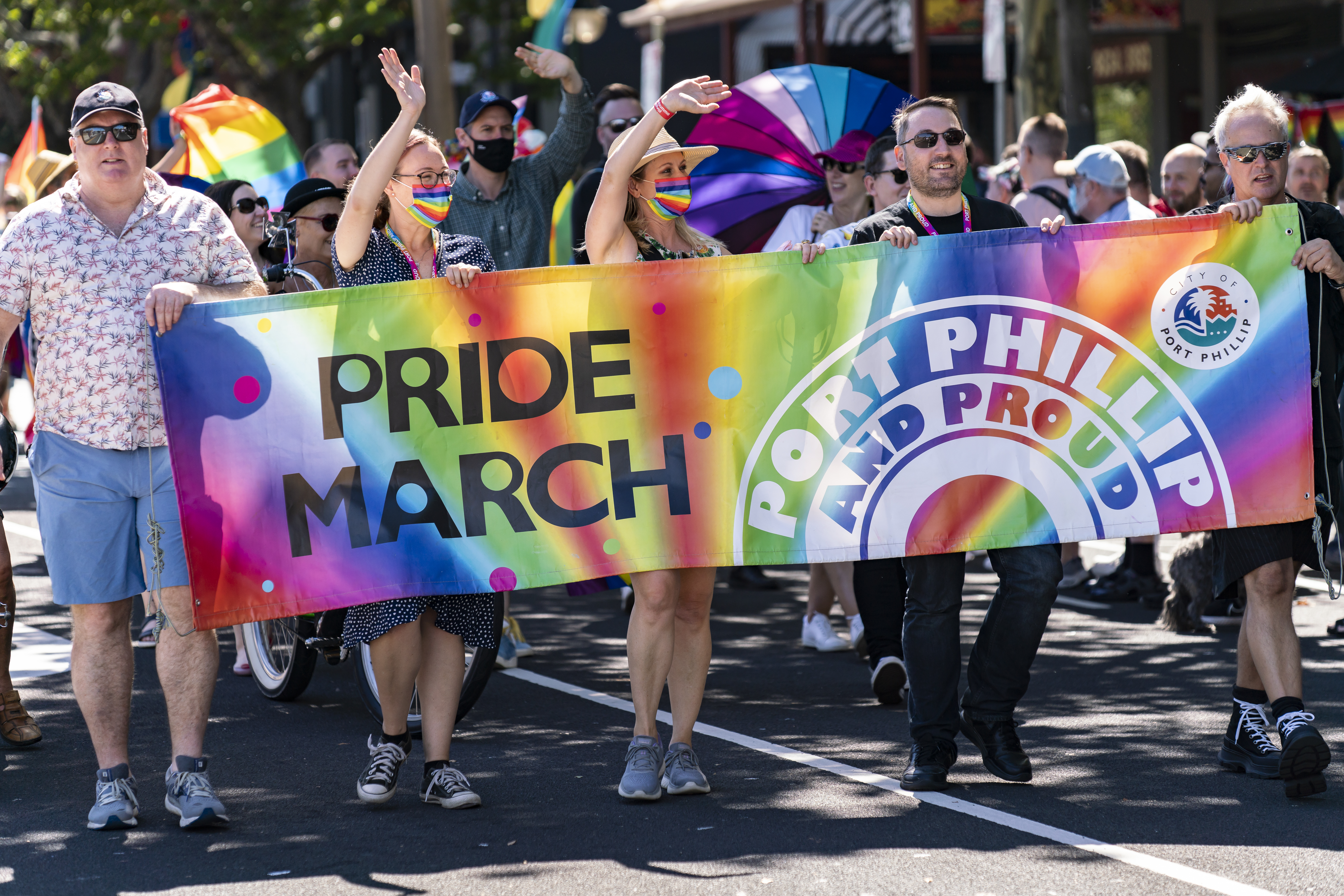
Midsumma Pride March 2022 Port Phillip group

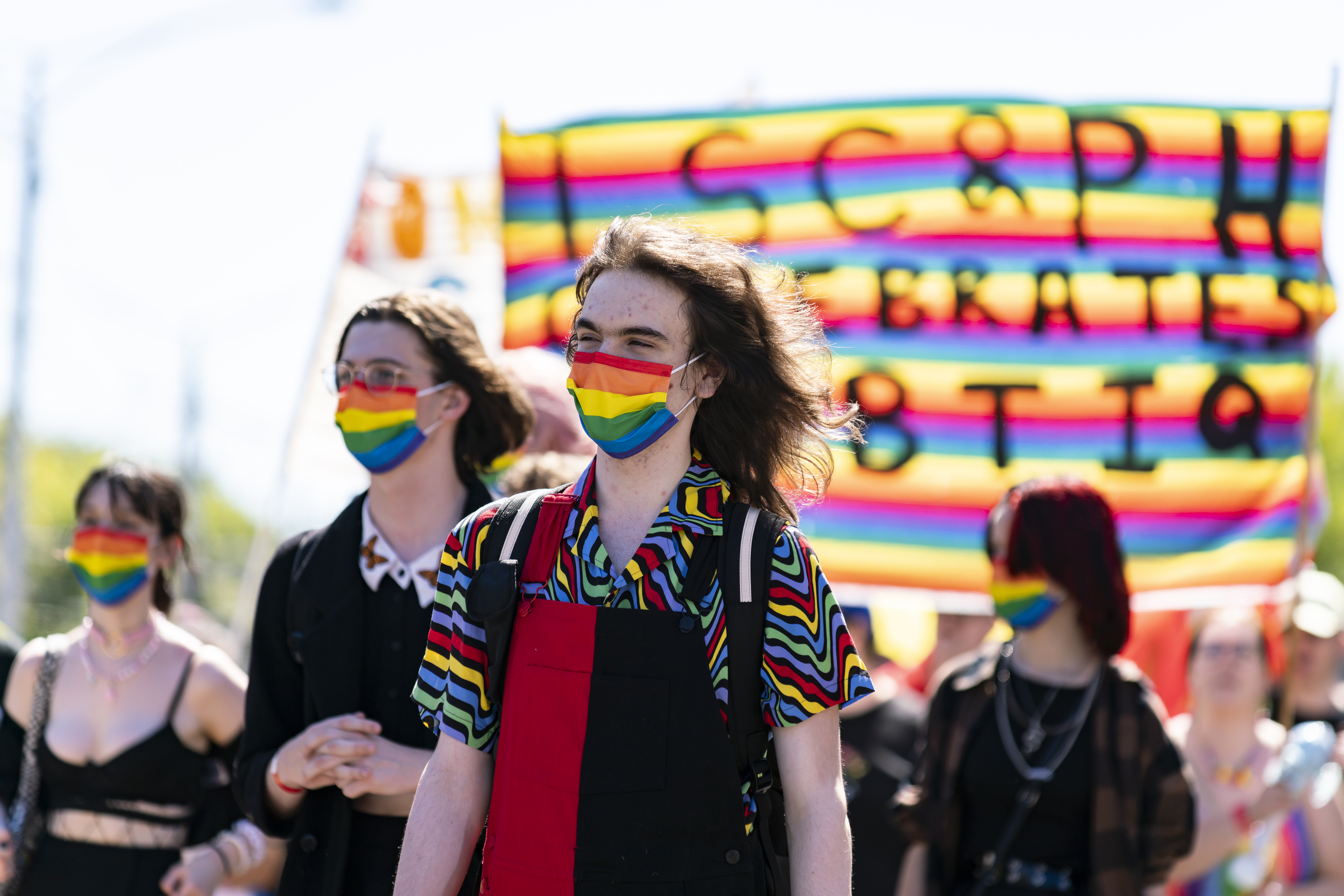
Pride marchers wearing face masks at Midsumma 2022

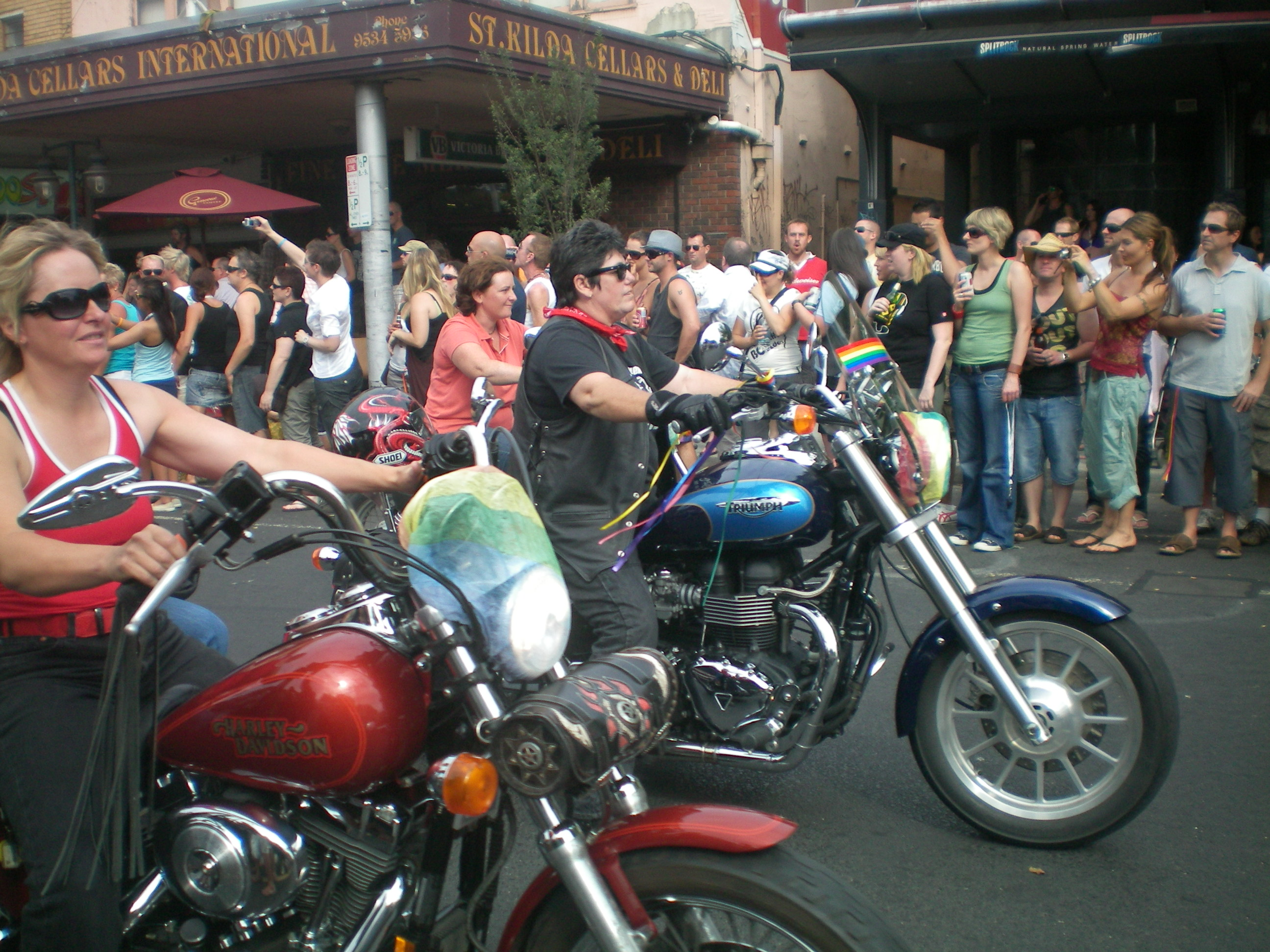
Midsumma Pride march participants 2009

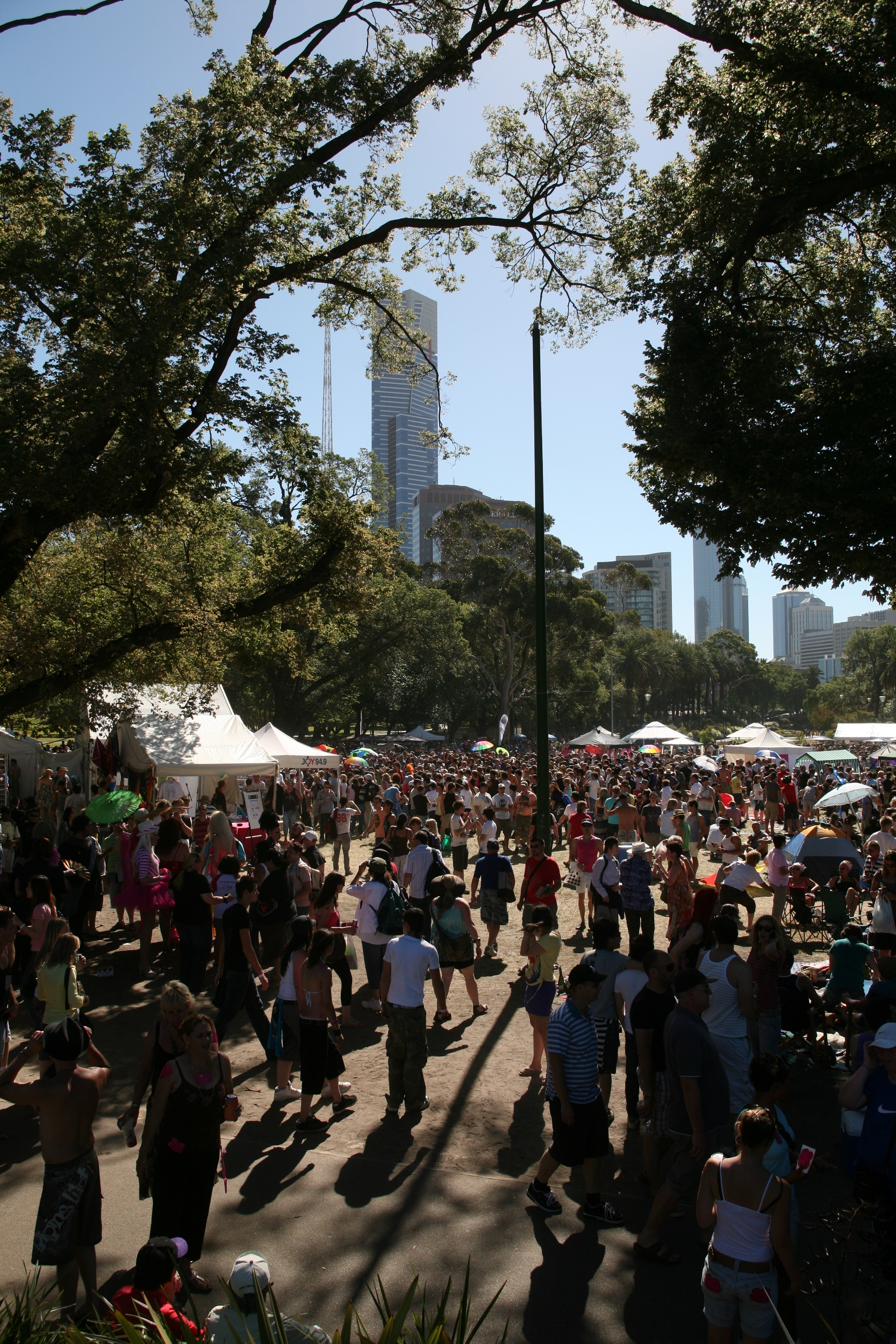
Midsumma Carnival 2010

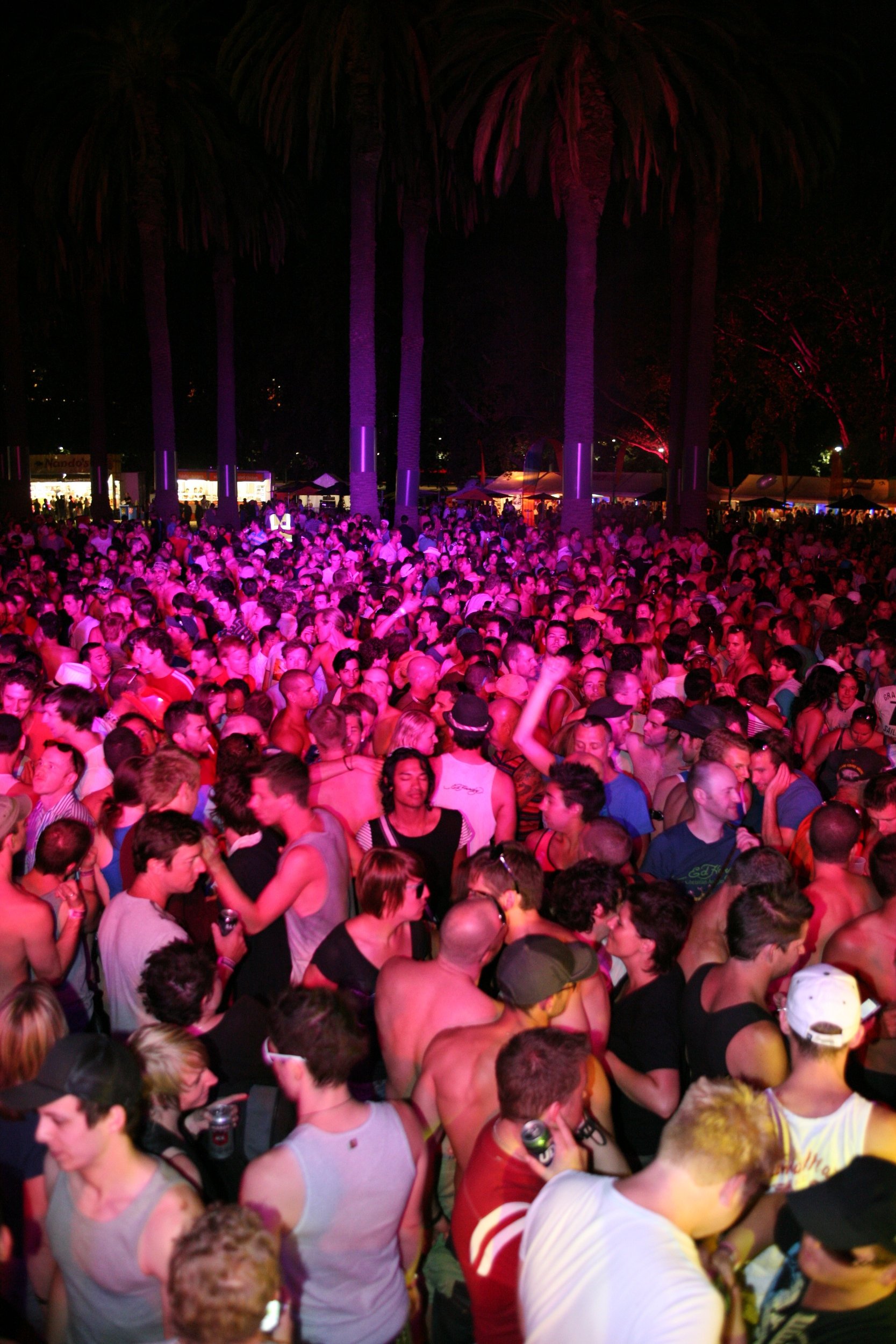
2010

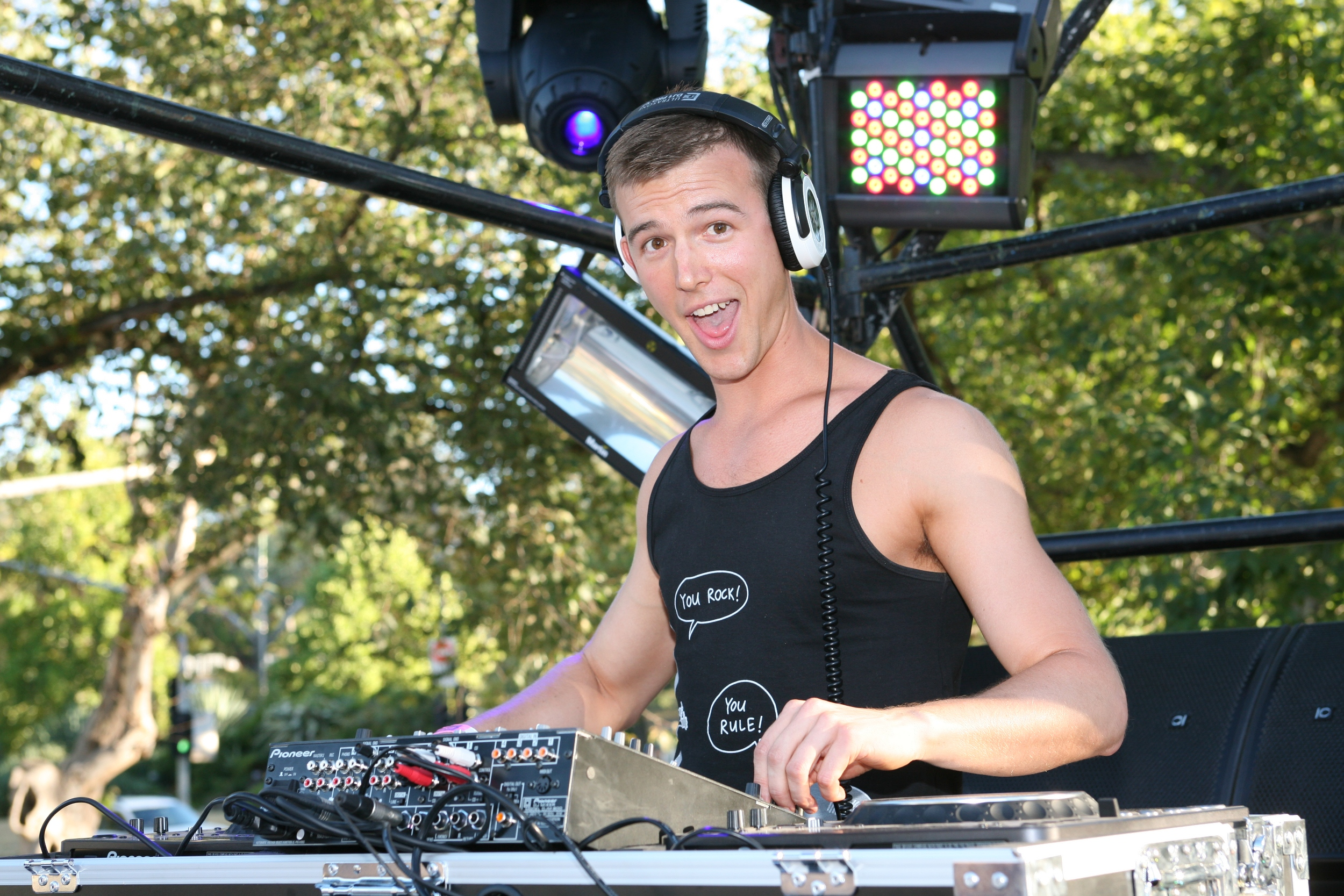
Adam Love at Midsumma

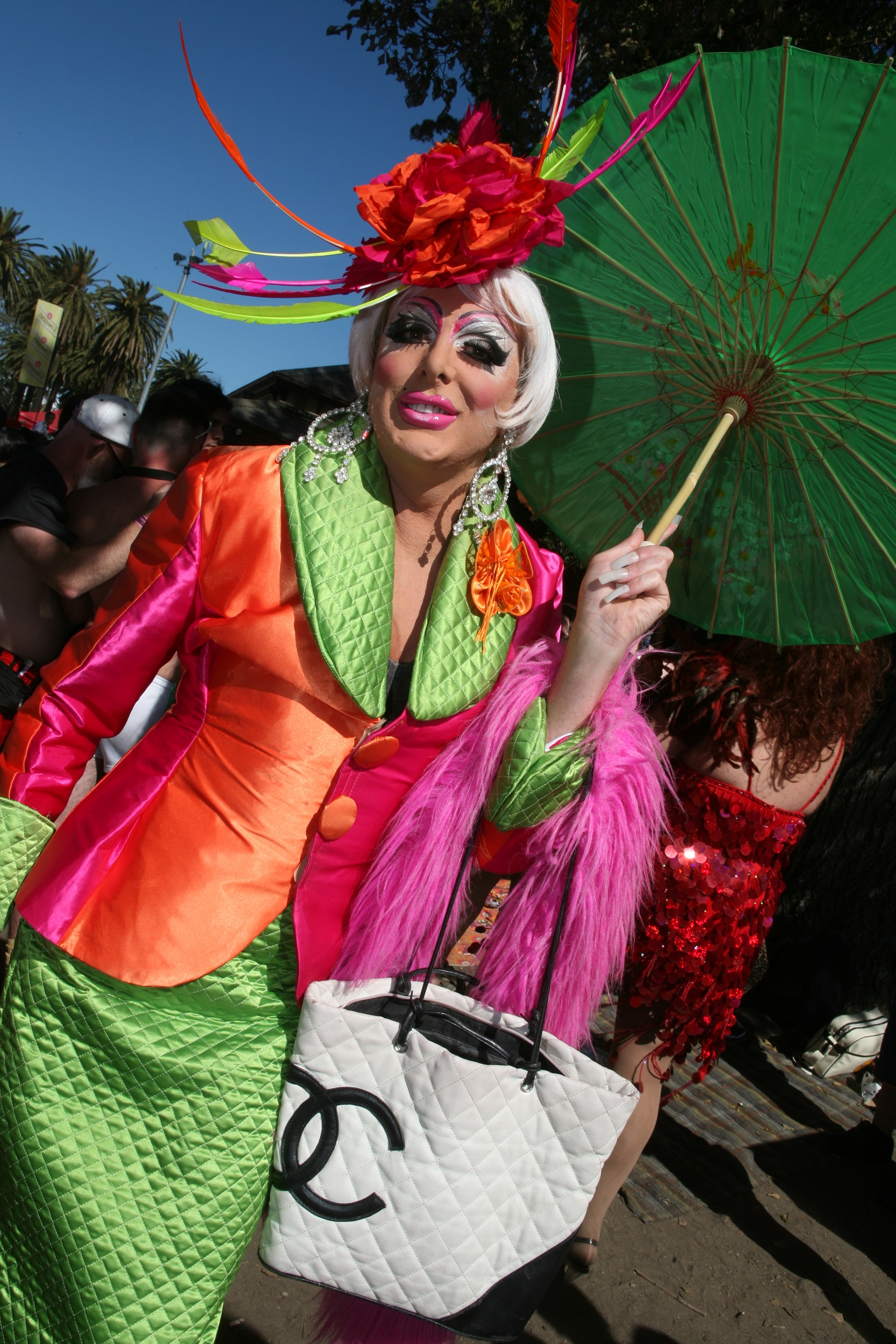
Drag in 2010 Midsumma

== See also ==
- List of LGBTQ events
