= Trans Men and Transmasculine People Day =

- Official name: Dia Nacional de Luta e Resistência de Homens Trans e Pessoas Transmasculinas
- Observed by: Brazil
- Type: National
- Date: 20 February
- Frequency: Annual
- First time: 2015; 11 years ago

The National Day of Struggle and Resistance of Trans Men and Transmasculine People (Brazilian Portuguese: Dia Nacional de Luta e Resistência de Homens Trans e Pessoas Transmasculinas) or simply Trans Men and Transmasculine People Day (Portuguese: Dia de Homens Trans e Pessoas Transmasculinas) is a date celebrated annually on February 20 in Brazil, focusing on addressing issues related to trans men and transmasculine people in the country.

== History ==
In February, Transmasculine Visibility Month is celebrated, in reference to the first National Meeting of Trans Men and Transmasculine People, which took place in 2015 at the Faculty of History and Geography at the University of São Paulo, organized by the Brazilian Institute of Transmasculinities (IBRAT).

With support from the Museum of Sexual Diversity, the Cinemateca Brasileira held an event in 2024 to portray transmasculine people and trans men. Also in 2024, the Public Defender's Office of the State of Bahia organized a military enlistment drive for transgender people who had legally changed their gender to male. And in March they started making Transmasculine Marches, and subsequent years.

== See also ==
- International Transgender Day of Visibility
- International Men's Day
- Pride Month
