= International Drag Day =

Day to celebrate drag art around the world

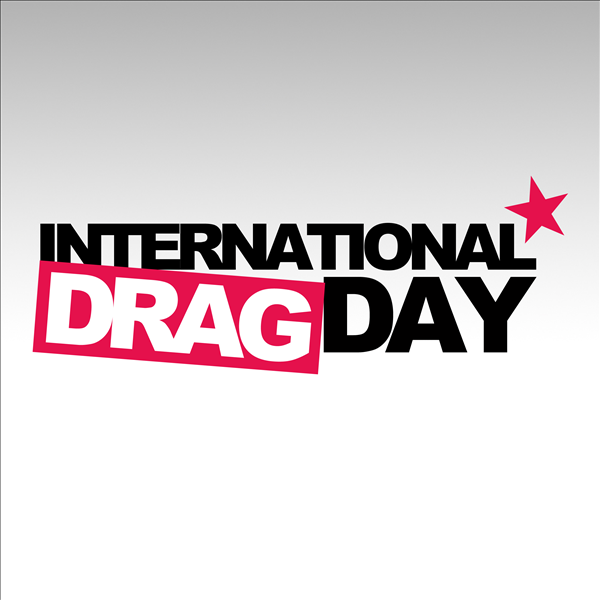
International Drag Day's logo

The International Drag Day is an annual event on July 16 that aims to celebrate and recognize the Drag art all around the world.

== History ==
The International Drag Day was founded by Adam Stewart in 2009 through his fan page for drag queens on Facebook, with a main objective to provide drag artists with the space to expose their creativity and culture in a proper way. In an interview with Guidetogay.com, Stewart describes the event saying:

International Drag Day is a day where all around the world on every gay scene we take this opportunity to celebrate and thank the drag artists that add so much to gay life and culture. This is the reason I launched this concept. I saw that there was no such day or event on an international platform in which we celebrated drag artists.

In 2017's edition, the BBC's weatherman Owain Wyn Evans gave drag queen-themed forecast and paid tribute to drag queens and RuPaul's Drag Race as a way to show support for the celebration.

== Activities ==
In addition to the artistic shows and performances, the event hosts discussions and debates about the Drag artists rights and situation in different countries, the role of the Drag community in the LGBT movement, feminism and other topics by sharing experiences from daily life.

== Partners ==
Guidetogay.com was the main media partner for the annual celebration back in 2009 as one of its biggest channels to communicate the concept and spread it worldwide.

Feast of Fun, the Chicago based talk show, helped promoting the event also by ensuring a podcast where Fausto Fernós, Marc Felion and the drag queen Elysse Giovani discuss the activities held.

In Australia, the Stonewall Hotel was a big logistic partner for one of the editions and hosted a huge event to celebrate the day.

Also in Australia, local LGBTIQ+ publication, A Modern Gay's Guide covered the activities happening across the Pacific to support and celebrate, including the aforementioned Stonewall Hotel event.

== See also ==
- List of LGBTQ awareness periods
