= Singapore Dads for Life movement =

Dads for Life (DFL) is a national men's movement in Singapore promoting active fatherhood.

== History ==
Dads for Life emerged in Singapore in the context of two sociological trends. From the 1970s, increasing numbers of women took to the labour force, leading to an evolution of expectations of fatherhood beyond the traditional role of “breadwinner”. In 1991, 55.7% of women in the prime working ages of 25 to 54 were employed. By 2010, a record 71.7% of women were in the labour force. Such “dual career” families have required fathers to play a more active role in their children’s lives than before.

The second trend has been the continued lag in the involvement of fathers in family life behind that of mothers, despite evolving social and familial norms. In line with research findings in other countries, a 2006 study conducted in Singapore found that mothers were still much more likely than fathers to be their child’s caregiver. Traditional male roles also persist in the type of relationship most children have with their fathers. A 2001 study of post-secondary students in Singapore found that they perceived fathers as significantly less warm than mothers, in that fathers were less affectionate and provided less support and guidance to adolescent children in their everyday lives.

The late 1990s saw an emergence of independent efforts to promote involved fatherhood and in 1999, the first father-centric social organisation, Centre For Fathering (CFF), was registered in Singapore providing family life education and father-child bonding activities. In 2004, the Association of Devoted and Active Family Men (ADAM) was formed to raise awareness on men’s responsibilities and roles in society and family. Government interest began in earnest after the first national survey on fatherhood concluded in 2009. Conducted by the Ministry of Social and Family Development (MSF), then the Ministry of Community Development, Youth and Sports and the lead government agency for family matters in Singapore, this gave national focus to the agenda of promoting involved fatherhood. The survey which polled 2,220 Singaporeans and Permanent Residents aged 18 and above found widespread agreement that fathers play an important parenting role, but that fathers still spend less time with their children than mothers. 95% of fathers surveyed also agreed that being a father and raising children was one of the most fulfilling experiences a man could have, but cited parenting challenges such as work responsibilities, financial pressures and a lack of parenting resources.

With support from MSF, Dads for Life was launched on 19 November 2009 in conjunction with International Men’s Day, with a mission to “inspire, mobilize and involve fathers to become good influencers in their children’s lives for life”. Volunteers led an island-wide distribution of toolkit packs to fathers containing red and white wristbands and lapel pins bearing the movement’s logo. The local significance of this movement for the family is captured by the National Family Council's chairman Mr Lim Soon Hock: “co-parenting is essential for a child’s optimal growth and development, with fathers and mothers playing distinct but complementary roles. Being an active father can be challenging, but it is also a very fulfilling experience.” DFL celebrated its first anniversary on 18 November 2010.

By 2011, organisations across Singapore were taking up the Dads for Life message of active fatherhood. Dad and child programs were held with SAFRA, the National Library Board (NLB), Community Development Councils, and local businesses through the Dads@Workplaces initiative. As a thriving program partnership grew in the English language medium, Dads for Life began focusing on dads from Singapore's other main language groups. An inaugural series of local language dad conferences was launched in 2012, in the official languages of Chinese, Tamil, and Malay. In March 2013, Dads for Life launched the Great Wall of Dads, a nationwide campaign to rally Singaporeans to display the Dads for Life Decal as a show of support for all fathers around them. Creative displays of the over 500,000 decals in circulation were submitted from across Singapore. High-profile annual events currently include the SAFRA Bay Run, one of Singapore’s largest and most popular running events, the Dads for Life Conference, and NLB's 10,000 & More Fathers Reading! initiative.

On 1 May 2013, the Ministry of Manpower (Singapore) introduced one week of government-paid paternity leave for working and self-employed fathers, thus recognising the importance of father involvement from the birth of the child.

== Effects of Father Involvement ==
Dads for Life is founded on fatherhood research from the 1990s onward that points to the significant benefit of fathers’ involvement on child development in terms of improved cognitive, socio-emotional, psychological and academic outcomes. For example, children with involved and nurturing fathers are noted to:

- develop higher intelligence quotients (IQs), better language and reasoning skills;
- be more securely attached to their caregivers;
- experience less emotional distress during adolescence;
- report lower levels of anxiety and depression as adults;
- perform better in school.

Active paternal involvement is also linked to benefits such as:

- better couple relationships among parents;
- lower levels of maternal stress;
- positive changes in fathers' self-identity.

== Organisation ==
=== National Family Council ===
Dads for Life is an initiative of the National Family Council (NFC). The NFC is a people-sector Council formed on 1 May 2006 to "champion and promote the building of resilient families, and provide a voice of the people on family issues". It is an advisory and consultative body for family-related policies, issues and programmes. The NFC is headed by Mr Lim Soon Hock, Chairman of Centre for Fathering.

=== Fathers Action Network ===
The Fathers Action Network (FAN) was constituted as a workgroup of the NFC when DFL was launched in November 2009. FAN functions as a consultative network for father-related issues and programmes, and has three stated goals:

1. To increase awareness and knowledge about the critical impact of fathers’ involvement on their children’s lives;
2. To mobilise individuals, organisations and communities, and promote greater collaboration amongst stakeholders, in increasing fathers’ involvement in their children’s lives; and
3. To empower and support fathers in their roles as parents.

FAN comprises 15 members from various nonprofit organisations and business enterprises, reflecting the community-driven nature of the movement. FAN is headed by Mr Richard Seow, a former banker. Describing the approach adopted by FAN, Mr Seow noted that “many organisations…are already engaging and supporting fathers. Rather than replicate their good work, the network, through its multi-stakeholder representation, hopes to help fathers identify and leverage these resources as they assume increasingly diverse roles in co-parenting and modern family life.”

=== Dads for Life Secretariat ===
The DFL Secretariat functions as an executive and coordinating arm of the movement and is centralized within MSF.

== Program Tracks ==
=== Fathers@Schools ===
In 2009, a public survey of schools administrators examined the involvement of fathers in the school environment in Singapore. This led to a publication of international and local best practices for engaging fathers and starting father support groups in schools. On 1 April 2010, the Fathers@Schools scheme was launched with more than 50 partner schools. Schools on board the public scheme receive seed funding of S$2,000 annually to support or organise father-focused activities. By November 2010, 66 schools had joined Fathers@Schools including two special education (SPED) schools. By April 2012, the second anniversary of Fathers@Schools, membership numbers had more than doubled to 162 schools, including pre-schools, special education, primary and secondary schools. 23 active fathers were appointed to a new advocacy role as Fathers@Schools Ambassadors. The second anniversary also saw the premiere of "The Little Star", a thought-provoking 20-minute short film directed by Jack Neo, and produced as part of a package for schools and community agencies to inspire conversation in fathering workshops and activities.

=== Dads@Workplaces ===
A National Fatherhood Conference was held on 14 May 2010 targeting employers and organisations to promote a father-friendly work environment. The inaugural event drew a strong show of interest with employers sending over 1000 participants. Since then, the Dads for Life conference has become an annual fixture in the movement's calendar, featuring fatherhood experts such as Ken Canfield and Wilfried C. Hoecke. Dads@Workplaces was first announced in November 2010, as the new initiative to engage employers in supporting fatherhood as part of work culture such as through celebrating new fathers, organizing fathering talks and allowing flexible work arrangements to better manage work-family balance. The Dads@Workplaces initiative was officially launched on 27 May 2011. An original play titled "Old Dad, New Dad" was produced for this program by The Voice, a community theatre group, and has been touring workplaces and organisations across the island.

=== Research Initiatives ===
A review of international research on fatherhood was compiled in 2009, with 40,000 booklets distributed in the first year of the movement. In June 2010, the Asia Fatherhood Research Conference was convened with the National University of Singapore's Asia Research Institute as the first such conference in Asia, bringing together researchers, policymakers, and practitioners to explore the roles and challenges of Asian fathers and fatherhood in Asian countries. The conference featured 17 speakers from seven countries and was opened by Parliamentary Secretary of the Ministry of National Development (Singapore), Dr Mohamad Maliki Bin Osman. A second research conference was held in July 2011, and jointly organised with the Social Service Training Institute, the training academy of the National Council of Social Service, to engage social service professionals working with children and families on intervention strategies that worked well with fathers. In September 2011, a monthly bulletin for social service practitioners, "Dad Matters", was launched to promote conversation around current research issues on fatherhood.

=== Social Media Outreach ===
In building new media reach, Dads for Life launched a website and social media channels on Facebook and Twitter on 1 April 2010 to serve as a digital repository, online forum and support network for fathers. At the same time, a national student blog contest was held to give voice to children's appreciation and need for father involvement. The contest "Dads Come In Different Shapes & Sizes But They Are The Best Dads For Life" drew 677 published entries from children across primary and secondary schools, with Crescent Girls' School and Junyuan Primary School winning the school prizes. On Children's Day 2010, Dads for Life ran a second online contest, "The Joy of Being There", this time collecting 110 stories from Singaporean fathers through Facebook. In September 2011, Dads for Life ran a 6-week national contest receiving over 350 personal tribute stories and memories from the general public that were written to appreciate and remember their dads by. "All About Dad" concluded with the 2nd Anniversary celebration of Dads for Life, with Griffiths Primary School winning the school prize. In March 2012, a Dads for Life Facebook game "Point, Click! Connect Dads & Kids!" was launched with dad and child cooperative play challenges, and a message on positive cyber habits. A nationwide campaign was launched a year later, in March 2013, to celebrate fatherhood and promote the understanding of the vital role fathers play as a "Great Wall of Dads" around the community. The campaign invited the general public to show their support for fathers and father-figures by displaying the widely distributed Dads for Life decal, and featured a mobile contest that drew over 140 snapshots of creative decal displays.

=== Community Partnerships ===
As an umbrella movement, Dads for Life collaborates with community and corporate partners who spread the movement’s message through their own activities and networks. The Dads@Communities initiative was formalised on 14 July 2012, to harness the significant network potential of various community organisations such as residents and neighbourhood committees, self-help groups and social service agencies that seek to engage fathers. Examples of local community partnerships with Dads for Life include:

- North East Community Development Council (NECDC) - NECDC started its own multi year program called "Family and Fathering Initiative@NorthEast" (FINE) in the North East district. Launched on 29 May 2010 and supported by Dads for Life, the program targets low-income families to help fathers with effective strategies for balancing work and staying involved with a slate of fathering workshops, talks, and camps.
- Singapore Indian Development Association (SINDA) - SINDA set up a Parents Division in January 2012 with a special focus on fathers. In September 2012, it ran a first-ever Tamil language conference for dads. This was followed with a family bonding camp in December 2012, with close to a hundred Indian families participating.
- Association for Devoted and Active Family Men (ADAM Association) - ADAM has been engaging fathers in the Malay community on family and fatherhood issues. In July 2012, it successfully anchored a Malay language conference for dads, with over 500 participants.
- 10,000 Fathers Reading! initiative - The National Library Board's Fathers Read and Ride initiative, supported by Dads for Life, was held from June to September 2010 to encourage fathers to read with their children. Participants boarded a dedicated MRT train and were treated to storytelling sessions conducted in creative ways. In 2011, this annual event featured a dads and kids sleepover at the Children's section of the National Library.
- ISCOS Family Day - On 20 June 2010, also Father's Day, Dads for Life supported the Family Day organised by Industrial and Services Co-Operative Society Ltd (ISCOS), an agency assisting with the reintegration and employment of ex-offenders. The event brought together over 300 ISCOS ex-offenders, many of whom are fathers, and their families.
- National Runway Cycling and Skating - On 20 June 2010, Dads for Life supported the National Runway Cycle and Skate 2010 event organised by the Singapore Armed Forces Reservists Association (SAFRA), a club for Singapore Armed Forces employees and National Servicemen. The annual event opens up the Paya Lebar Airbase runway to the public to cycle and skate, and saw the participation of an estimated 8000 people, including many fathers and their children. In June 2012, the event was organised with a special emphasis on fathers.
- SAFRA AVventura - In January 2011, SAFRA introduced a new Dads for Life Challenge to its annual cross-terrain adventure race, featuring 14 father-child teams. Teams competed together in various challenges along a 6 km race route in which they navigated on bike and foot. In 2013, the event reported a 50% increase in the number of father-child participants to 64.
