= International Non-Binary People's Day =

Annual day of observance, 14 July

- Observed by: Worldwide
- Type: International, Cultural
- Date: 14 July
- Next time: 14 July 2026
- Frequency: Annual
- First time: 2012
- Related to: Parents' Day, Children's Day, International Transgender Day of Visibility, International Men's Day, International Women's Day, Non-Binary Week

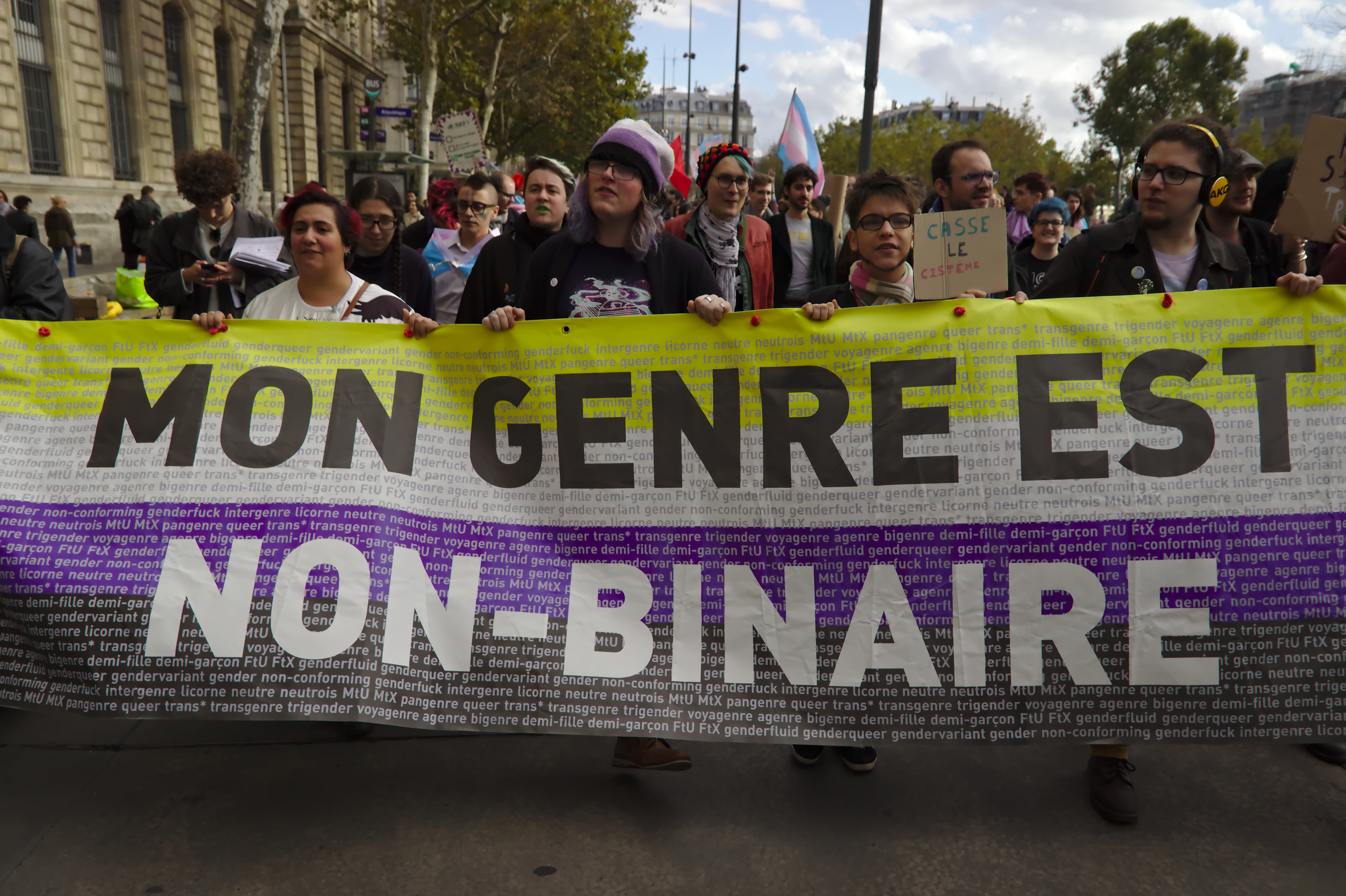

International Non-Binary People's Day is observed each year on 14 July and is aimed at raising awareness and organising around the issues faced by non-binary people around the world. The day was first celebrated in 2012, started by Katje van Loon. The date was chosen for being precisely midway between International Women's Day and International Men's Day.

Non-Binary Awareness Week is the week starting on the Monday, or Sunday regionally, preceding International Non-Binary People's Day on 14 July. This is an LGBTQ+ awareness period dedicated to non-binary people.

== See also ==
- Discrimination against non-binary people
- List of LGBTQ awareness periods
- Gender identity
- Gender expression
- Third-person pronoun
- International Women's Day, March 8
- International Men's Day, November 19
- Parents' Day
