= Agender Pride Day =

Annual day of observance on 19 May

Agender Pride Day is an annual event dedicated to celebrating agender people and identity, as well as raising awareness of the issues and discrimination that they face. It is celebrated annually on 19 May.

== Background ==
Agender is a gender identity wherein an individual has no gender at all, and does not necessarily follow gender roles. It falls under the non-binary umbrella, and sometimes the transgender umbrella. The agender flag was created by a user on Tumblr in 2014.

== History and aims ==
Agender Pride Day is celebrated annually on 19 May. The first Agender Pride Day took place on 19 May 2017, months after a 27-year-old resident in Oregon was legally recognised as agender in the US. The celebration was established by members of the community who felt that agender people were being excluded from broader non-binary and trans spaces and conversations. The celebration's purposes include highlighting the challenges faced by agender people, celebrating identity, and increasing knowledge and visibility of the agender community and to reduce discrimination. It is one of the newer recognized LGBTQIA+ awareness periods, and also aims to amplify the voices of agender people. Individuals can celebrate Agender Pride Day any way that they choose, with a writer from Diva recommending that non-agender people celebrate by learning about agender identities, people and terminology. Brian Webb from HomoCulture wrote in 2025, "Agender Pride Day cuts through the noise with a clear message: there are more ways to be human than our current systems allow. And every single one of them deserves respect." The day is celebrated in several countries, including South Africa. In the USA in 2024, the San Francisco Gay Men's Chorus celebrated it by publishing a blog highlighting musicians and performers artists who "challenged gender norms through their music".

== See also ==
- List of LGBTQ awareness periods
