= Gay Uncles Day =

LGBT event

Gay Uncles Day, also known as Guncles Day, is celebrated on the second Sunday in August. It was first celebrated in the US on a wide scale Sunday August 14, 2016.

The holiday was conceived and first promoted by Facebook user C.J. Hatter, but received visual attention online when the late former rugby player Simon Dunn posted on his Instagram asking people if they wanted to celebrate "Gay Uncles Day" on Sunday, August 14.

Dunn remarked that everyone had someone in their family who was always the voluntary bachelor, but that visibility could help celebrate those people and allow them the comfort to come out.

The holiday is mostly celebrated online with gay aunts, uncles, and other LGBTQ relatives, posting pictures of themselves with their nieces and nephews, and other close, young relatives. It is also celebrated by the parents celebrating their LGBT+ siblings and sharing gratitude for their presence in the children's lives.

Since 2016, the holiday has been celebrated on the second Sundays in August in 2018, and 2019, including by celebrities such as Simon Dunn and Anderson Cooper. The holiday has been featured on NBC, Advocate Mag, and Out Lifestyle.
