= Zero Discrimination Day =

Holiday observed on 1 March

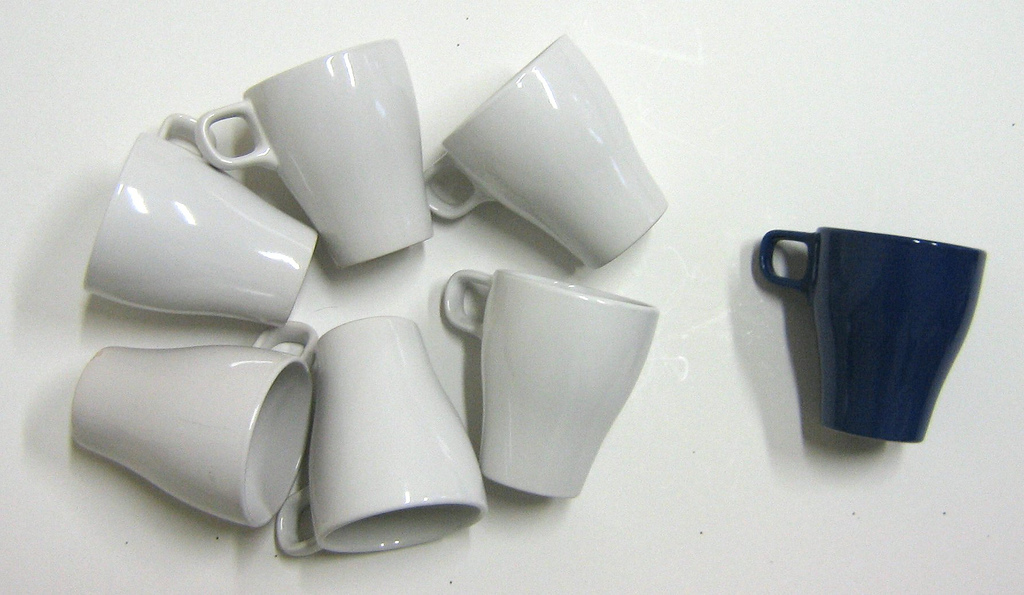
- Discrimination, Diversity, Equal rights
- Also called: #zerodiscriminationday
- Observed by: United Nations (UN)
- Type: Cultural
- Date: 1 March
- Frequency: Annual
- Related to: UNAIDS, LGBT Pride

Zero Discrimination Day is an annual day celebrated on 1 March each year by the United Nations (UN) and other international organizations. The day aims to promote equality before the law and is practiced throughout all of the member countries of the UN. It was first celebrated on March 1, 2014, and was launched by UNAIDS' executive director Michel Sidibé on 27 February that year with a major event in Beijing.

In February 2017, UNAIDS called on people to "make some noise around zero discrimination, to speak up and prevent discrimination from standing in the way of achieving ambitions, goals and dreams".

The day is particularly noted by organizations like UNAIDS that combat discrimination against people living with HIV/AIDS. "HIV related stigma and discrimination is pervasive and exists in almost every part of the world including our Liberia," according to Dr. Ivan F. Camanor, chairman of the National AIDS Commission of Liberia. The UN Development Programme also paid tribute in 2017 to LGBTI people with HIV/AIDS who face discrimination.

Campaigners in India have used this day to speak out against laws making discrimination against the LGBTI community more likely, especially during the previous campaign to repeal the law (Indian Penal Code, s377) that used to criminalize homosexuality in that country, before that law was overturned by the Indian Supreme Court in September 2018.

In 2015, Armenian Americans in California held a "die-in" on Zero Discrimination Day to remember the victims of the Armenian genocide.

The theme for 2026 is "People First".

== See also ==
- Anti-discrimination law
- Zero tolerance
