= International Lesbian Day =

Day of celebrating lesbians

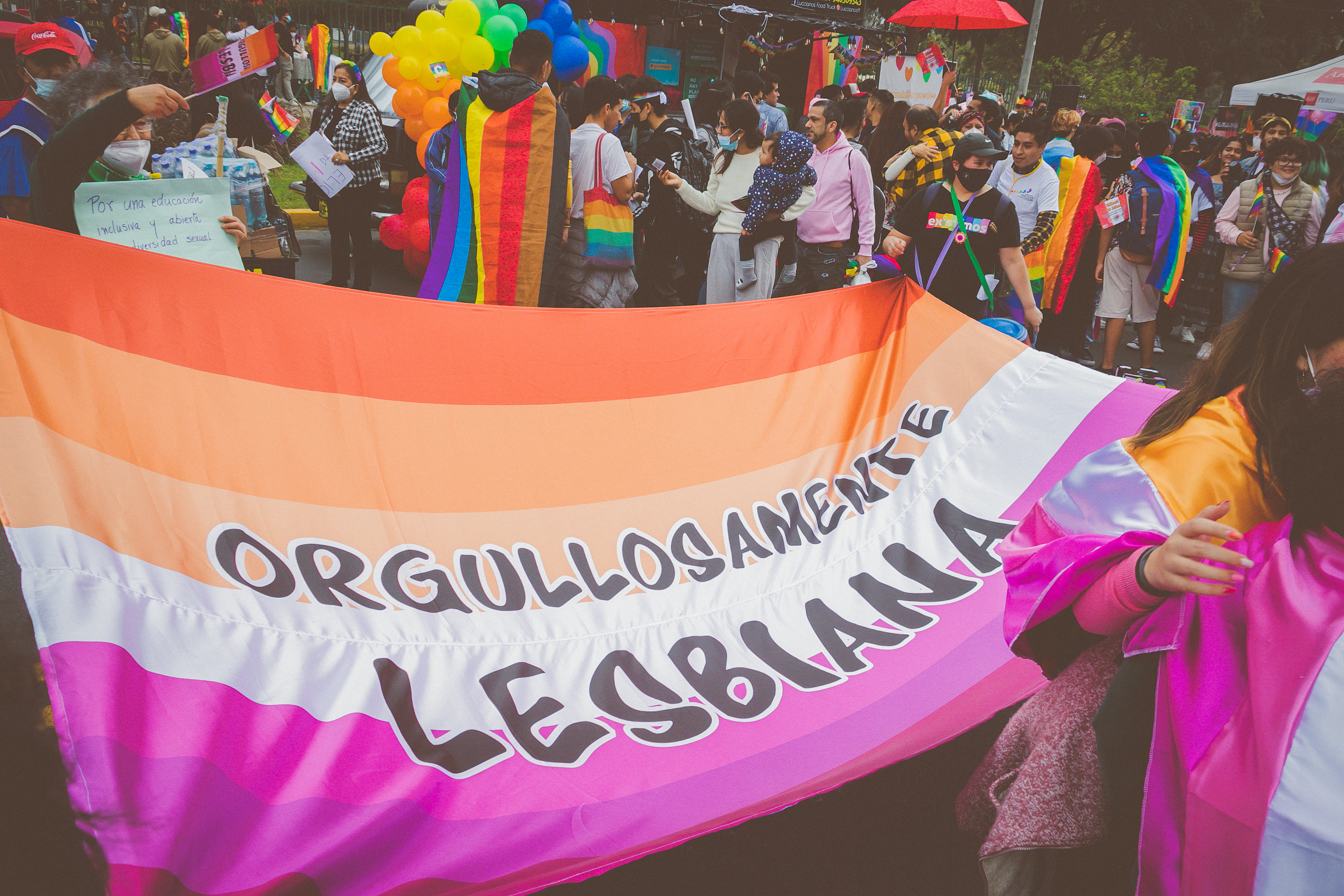

International Lesbian Day, held on October 8, is a day of celebrating lesbians, along with their culture, history, and diversity. This day is celebrated by lesbians and allies with various community events, dances, and conferences and is mostly celebrated in New Zealand and Australia. It is unknown when it was first celebrated: some say it started in New Zealand in 1980, but others say that it started in Australia in 1990.

== In New Zealand ==
International Lesbian Day in New Zealand is said to have started on March 8, 1980, with the very first Lesbian Day March on International Women's Day. The march only consisted of 40 women who marched through Wellington's Central Park.

== In Australia ==
The first international Lesbian Day event in Australia was held at the Collingwood Town Hall in Melbourne on October 13, 1990. They had featured musicians, market stalls, readings, and danced to live music. Since then, the lesbian community in Melbourne has celebrated this day either on or around October 8. Lesbians now ask the community to donate to charities that support lesbian women.

ACON, an LGBTQ health promotion organization that specialize in HIV prevention and support based in New South Wales, used this day in 2008 to launch their lesbian health strategy. Lesbians On the Loose used October 8 in 2009 to celebrate their 20th anniversary.

== See also ==
- Lesbian Visibility Day
- National Lesbian Visibility Day
