= International Men's Day =

Annual international celebration

- Also called: Men's Day
- Observed by: Worldwide
- Type: International; Civil awareness day Men day
- Date: 19 November
- Next time: 19 November 2027
- Frequency: Annual
- First time: 1999; 27 years ago
- Started by: Thomas Oaster (1992, Malta); Jerome Teelucksingh (1999, Modern)
- Related to: Father's Day, Children's Day, International Women's Day, International Non-Binary People's Day

International Men's Day (IMD) is a global awareness day for issues that men face, including abuse, homelessness, suicide, and violence, celebrated annually on 19 November. The day was inauguated in the early 1990s in Malta by Thomas Oaster, and has been recognized by groups in other countries around the world. The objectives of celebrating an International Men's Day are set out in "All the Six Pillars of International Men's Day". It is also an occasion to celebrate boys' and men's lives, achievements and contributions, in particular for their contributions to nation, union, society, community, family, marriage, and childcare.

== History ==
Inaugurated on 7 February 1992 by Thomas Oaster, the project of International Men's Day was conceived one year earlier, on 8 February 1991. The project was re-initialised in 1999 in Trinidad and Tobago. The longest running celebration of International Men's Day is Malta, where events have occurred since 7 February 1994. As Malta was the only country that observed the February date of celebrating men and their contributions to society, the Maltese AMR Committee voted in 2009 to shift the date for IMD to 19 November.

Jerome Teelucksingh, who revived the event, chose 19 November to honour his father's birthday and also to celebrate how on that date in 1989 Trinidad and Tobago's men's football team had united the country with their endeavours to qualify for the World Cup. Teelucksingh has promoted International Men's Day as not just a gendered day but a day where all issues affecting men and boys can be addressed. He has said of IMD and its grassroots activists, "They are striving for gender equality and patiently attempt to remove the negative images and the stigma associated with men in our society."

Unlike International Women's Day, International Men's Day is not officially recognised by the United Nations.

=== Early background ===
Calls for an International Men's Day have been noted since at least the 1960s, when many men were reported to "have been agitating privately to make 23 February International Men's Day, the equivalent of 8 March, which is International Women's Day". In the Soviet Union this day was the Red Army and Navy Day since 1922, which in 2002 was renamed to Defender of the Fatherland Day. The date was informally viewed a male counterpart of Women's Day (8 March) in some territories of the union, however due to the day's limited focus to historical events some countries of the former union have moved to adopt the more 'male specific' 19 November as International Men's Day, including Belarus, Ukraine, Moldova, Russia and Georgia.

In 1968, the American journalist John P. Harris wrote an editorial in the Salina Journal highlighting a lack of balance in the Soviet system, which promoted an International Women's Day for the female workers without promoting a corresponding day for male workers. Harris stated that although he did not begrudge Soviet women their March day of glory, its resulting gender inequality exhibited a flaw in the communist system, which "makes much of the equal rights it has given the sexes, but as it turns out, the women are much more equal than the men". Harris stated that while the men toiled along in their grooves doing what their government and womenfolk tell them to do, there was no day when males are recognised for their service, leading Harris to conclude that, "This strikes me as unwarranted discrimination and rank injustice." Similar questions about the inequality of observing women's day without a corresponding men's day occurred in media publications from the 1960s through to the 1990s, at which time the first attempts at inaugurating international Men's Day are recorded.

In the early 1990s, organizations in the United States, Australia and Malta held small events in February at the invitation of Thomas Oaster who directed the Missouri Center for Men's Studies at the University of Missouri–Kansas City. Oaster successfully promoted the event in 1993 and 1994, but his following attempt in 1995 was poorly attended and he ceased plans to continue the event in subsequent years. Australians also ceased to observe the event (until they re-established it on 19 November 2003) whilst the Maltese Association for Men's Rights continued as the only country that continued to observe the event each year in February. Formerly being the only country still observing the original February date, the Maltese AMR Committee voted in 2009 to begin observing the day on 19 November in order to be synchronised with the rest of the world.

Although International Men's and Women's Day are considered to be 'gender-focused' events, they are not ideological mirror images because they highlight issues that are considered unique to men or to women. The history of IMD primarily concerns celebrating issues that are considered unique to the experiences of men and boys, along with an emphasis on positive role models, which is especially "deemed necessary in a social context which is often fascinated with images of males behaving badly... In highlighting positive male role models IMD attempts to show that males of all ages respond much more energetically to positive role models than they do to negative stereotyping".

== Six pillars ==
International Men's Day objectives are given as:

1. To promote positive male role models; not just movie stars and sports men but everyday, working-class men who are living decent, honest lives.
2. To celebrate men's positive contributions to society, community, family, marriage, child care, and the environment.
3. To focus on men's health and wellbeing: social, emotional, physical, and spiritual.
4. To highlight discrimination against men in areas of social services, social attitudes and expectations, and law.
5. To improve gender relations and promote gender equality.
6. To create a safer, better world, where people can be safe and grow to reach their full potential.

== Yearly themes ==
As well as the six pillars, an optional secondary theme for IMD has usually been suggested by world coordinators, such as peace in 2002, men's health in 2003, healing and forgiveness in 2007, positive male role models in 2009 and 'our children's future' in 2010.

- 2011: "Giving Boys the Best Possible Start in Life"
- 2012: "Helping Men and Boys Live Longer, Happier and Healthier Lives"
- 2013: "Keeping Men and Boys Safe"
- 2014: "Working Together for Men and Boys"
- 2015: "Working to Expand Reproductive Options for Men"
- 2016: "Stop Male Suicide". In every country except China, the rate of suicide in men is higher than that of women, in some cases as high as six men for every one woman, and life expectancy is routinely less for men than women in all countries. To this end, "Global Action on Men's Health (GAMH) wants the World Health Organization and other international public health bodies, as well as individual governments, to acknowledge the scale of the problems facing men and boys and to take sustained action to tackle them. This work should sit alongside continuing action to improve the health of women and girls."
- 2017: "Celebrating Men And Boys In All Their Diversity". The emphasis on "...A Call To Action for individuals, institutions, and organizations to innovate the manner in which they design and deliver resources and support services which speak to the unique needs and issues of men and boys".
- 2018: "Positive Male Role Models"
- 2019: "Making a Difference for Men and Boys"
- 2020: "Better Health for Men and Boys"
- 2021: "Better relations between men and women"
- 2022: "Helping Men and Boys". In Australia, "Celebrating mateship".
- 2023: "Zero Male Suicide". In the UK, the themes continue to be on supporting men and boys' wellbeing, supporting men's charities and being positive about men, masculinity and fathers.
- 2024: "Positive male role models".
- 2025: "Supporting men and boys".
- 2026: "The Future is Everyone".

== Regions ==
=== Africa ===
==== Botswana ====
International Men's Day was inaugurated in Botswana in 2011 by coordinator Geneuvieve Twala. One of the International Men's Day themes promoted was to help foster youth to unlock their creative identities to allow them to share their gifts with peers, family and the community, and to be seen and heard for who they are and not how they are perceived.

==== Burundi ====
On 19 November 2012, Burundi joined the world for the first time in celebrating the International Men's Day, as Association for the Protection of the Man in Distress (APHD Burundi) denounced violence inflicted on men by their wives. Vincent Bukuru, chairman of the APHD-Burundi said, "Violence on men rises when the man loses his job, during the end of year festivities (Christmas and New Year) and at the International Women's Day (8 March)." Bukuru called on the Burundian government to conduct a national investigation on types and origins of violence that men are facing, their consequences and their gravity which he stated is a violation of human rights.

==== Ghana ====
Ghana Fatherhood Initiative Foundation hosted an inaugural IMD celebration in 2009. The occasion was marked by a formal event with speakers, and included a ceremony of donating of books to several schools in the Ablekuma sub-district in Accra. The event was chaired by George Odame, the advisory board chairman of Ghana Fatherhood Initiative Foundation, who encouraged all fathers to read to their children as part of responsible fatherhood. The special guest of honour was Maxwell Mac. Ocloo who delivered a speech entitled 'Men – let us be instruments of positive influence' in which he encouraged men to lead by example.

==== Nigeria ====
Although there have been fragmented independent actions by some individuals and organisations to commemorate International Men's Day (IMD) over the years, there has been no properly coordinated commemorative event in Nigeria. However, ahead of the 2022 International Men's Day (IMD) event with the theme, Men Leading by Example, Sanmi Falobi, IMD 2022 Nigeria Coordinator and IMD Ambassador for West Africa, through initiatives by Innate Communications and other partners implored corporate organisations, governments, institutions, businesses, religious bodies, public/private sector enterprises, NGOs and the media, to initiate clusters of independent activities at highlighting the positive values of men to their families, communities and the society at large, in relation to the context of their careers, families, health & mental wellness, socio-economic sustainability as well as in the area of organisational or political leadership, as applicable, in commemorating 2022 International Men's Day. The IMD Nigeria Local Organising Committee (LOC) also held pre-IMD activities to complement other independent initiatives by other organisations to commemorate IMD in Nigeria.

In fostering increased participation in commemorative activities in Nigeria, the IMD local Organising Committee, since 2022 has embarked on a strategic alliance for greater commitments in commemorating IMD in Nigeria.

==== Seychelles ====
On 19 November 2012, Seychelles Government Minister Vincent Meriton declared this year the first that IMD has been celebrated at a National Government level. Minister Meriton said, "The time has come for us to adopt a new approach, instead of reinforcing negative stereotyping of males behaving badly, e.g. media portrayals of males as violent, power-hungry, irresponsible and so on. Such negative images are frequently used in an attempt to shame males into behaving more positively." Meriton stated that the practice of negative stereotyping ignores the fact that such negative behaviours do not apply to the vast majority of men and boys, or that such negativity may detrimentally impact the self-image and self-esteem of boys, which in turn impacts their willingness to contribute to building better relationships and communities as they grow into adults. In conclusion he stated that, "International Men's Day calls for and promotes positive masculinity which we in Seychelles can strongly identify with as it forms part of the social renaissance campaign launched at the beginning of the year by President James Michel."

==== South Africa ====
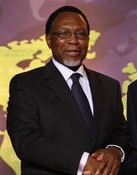
Deputy President Kgalema Motlanthe addressed an International Men's Day gathering in South Africa, 2009.

Positive Men's Movement of South Africa (POMESA) in partnership with South African Network of People Living with HIV and AIDS (NAPWA) organised the first Annual International Men's Day event. The event was held on 6 December 2008, and involved a Men's March for peace and justice from taxi rank to the national men's rally venue which is Rabasotho hall in Thembisa township, Ekurhuleni, Gauteng. Between three and five thousand men attended from all provinces of South Africa. Speakers in the event included the national government officials, national leadership of POMESA and NAPWA, and civil society, and included an Annual Men's Awards event to honour three outstanding men who have or and continue to contribute positively in the creation of peaceful and just society.

In 2008, POMESA and NAPWA celebrated IMD on 6 December. As the December date was not celebrated by other participating countries, discussions were undertaken within both organisations and in May 2009 the secretary general of NAPWA and POMESA Nkululeko Nxesi announced that the National Boards of both organisations have agreed to celebrate the Men's day on the same dates with other countries beginning on 19 November 2009 and in each year thereafter on the same date.

On 19 November 2009, five thousand men from across Africa converged on the Orlando Communal Hall in Soweto to celebrate the second annual International Men's Day, where they promoted gender equality, positive male role models and emphasised that 'not all men are bad people'. Deputy President of South Africa Kgalema Motlanthe delivered the keynote address at what was termed "a ground-breaking event". The meeting was organised and led by the National Association of People Living With HIV and AIDS (NAPWA) to highlight the need for treatment access to medication and prevention.

==== Tanzania ====
On Saturday 19 November 2011, Youth Challenge International (YCI), in partnership with local and international organisations celebrated International Men's Day for the first time in Arusha and Morogoro, Tanzania. In Arusha, YCI, The Umoja Centre, Support for International Change, UMATI, Initiative for Youth Organization and Global Service Corps hosted the event at the Mbauda Open Market Ground. This event was aimed to promote men and boys as positive role models and to educate the community on the role of males and females in health, education, family life, violence and life choices. The event included performances, games, and educational activities. Over 500 youth and other community members came together to acknowledge the roles and responsibilities of men and boys in creating a brighter future for all Tanzanians. To celebrate the event in Morogoro, volunteers, along with partner organisation Faraja Trust Fund, held a soccer tournament with 8 local teams. To qualify to participate in the tournament each team had to come to two information sessions on male sexual and reproductive health, HIV/AIDS, gender roles and good governance. YCI and Faraja provided an on-site HIV testing centre, a disc jockey with music and dancing throughout the day, and drama group performances on the key objectives of International Men's Day. Plans exist for the Tanzanian Men's Rights Organisation (TAMRA) to celebrate International men's day in 2013.

==== Zimbabwe ====
International Men's Day was inaugurated in Zimbabwe on 19 November 2011. The commemorations were held at Chibuku Stadium in Chitungwiza under the theme Giving The Boy Child The Best Possible Start In Life. Fred Misi, the chairman of Men's Forum Varume Svinurai/Vhukhani said the commemorations came at a time when attention was being given to the girl child at the expense of boys, and noted: "Whilst it is important to focus on the specific needs of the girl child, we are creating a crisis by ignoring the specific needs of the boy child", Misi highlighted the growing trend that many boys were dropping out of school and were hooked on hard drugs as well as abusing alcohol, while a significant number of those who were completed secondary and tertiary education were roaming the streets because of unemployment. He added the government and Zimbabweans needed to act immediately. A number of prominent persons attended and gave papers on the need to give the boy child assistance. There was drama and poetry from various groups and individual high school students in line with the theme of the celebrations, and the Zimbabwe Minister of Women Affairs, Gender and Community Development, Olivia Muchena gave a key note address in which she said, "It is an occasion for men to celebrate their achievements and contributions, in particular their contributions to community, family, marriage and child care while highlighting the discrimination against them... International Men's Day is an opportunity for people everywhere of good will to appreciate and celebrate the men in their life and the contributions they make to society for the greater good of all hence it being important for us to celebrate this day equally as we did with The International Women's Day."

=== Americas ===
==== Antigua and Barbuda ====
In 2010, the Government of Antigua and Barbuda announced its official inauguration of International Men's Day. The day was celebrated with a public observation, speeches and TV interviews. In the keynote speech C. W. Roberts defined the purpose of International Men's Day as "A global occasion to celebrate the positive contributions and variegated experience of being male. On this day we celebrate men's and boys' strengths whilst taking time to acknowledge their vulnerabilities and their needs." Roberts added that the day intended to transcend negative stereotyping and to encourage and embrace greater options for men and for all people.

==== Canada ====
Groups in three cities in Canada are known to have marked this occasion at least once:

- On 19 November 2009, directors of the Vancouver Manology Program held an all day event to mark the beginning of the Vancouver Men's Centre. As a feature of this event organisers announced their official endorsement of International Men's Day and held forums introducing attendees to the history, goals and values of the international event, including discussions toward planning larger IMD events in 2010. This marks the first Canadian 19 Nov IMD observation. In 2010, Canada IMD Coordinator David Hatfield organised a large event at the Roundhouse in Vancouver for numerous male and family-friendly organisations to display their social work to the general public. Entertainment and various speakers were included.
- The Council of the Corporation of the City of Oshawa issued a 2010 Proclamation that 19 November be designated Oshawa International Men's Day with the Proclamation: "And further take notice and let it be known that the Council of the Corporation of the City of Oshawa hereby urges all citizens to take cognisance of this event and fittingly join in its observance."
- The Laurel Centre in Winnipeg celebrated IMD with a public open house on 19 November announcing a new shelter program to help men and their children who are fleeing intimate partner violence. On 1 July 2010, the Men's Resource Centre (MRC) officially became a program of The Laurel Centre, and staff and volunteers said they were pleased with the new partnership which will provide a solid foundation of leadership and expertise from which to grow and develop services for men in Manitoba. The official IMD launch of this initiative was attended by several speakers including The Honorable Gord Mackintosh – Minister of Family Services; Mr. Justin Swandel – deputy mayor and The City of Winnipeg.

==== Cayman Islands ====
In 2011, the Department of Counselling Services' Family Resource Centre organised Cayman Islands' first IMD observation consisting of two events; The 1st Annual International Men's Day Football Tournament & Expo open to the public, and secondly a "Give Boys the Best Possible Start in Life" Roundtable Discussion as a featured broadcast. Miriam Foster, Acting Programme Coordinator of the Family Resource Centre said, "We feel it is important that boy's issues are highlighted and we give them an opportunity to express themselves."

On 19 November 2014, the Cayman Family Resource Centre (FRC) highlighted men's contribution to society, and asking them to make pledges for their futures. A short film was also shown to the public featuring local boys talking about serious issues that affect their lives. The Davenport Development International Men's Day Football Tournament took place on Saturday, 22 November 2014 at the Camana Bay Sports Complex, and Premier Alden McLaughlin delivered an International Men's Day Message. These events marked the fourth consecutive celebration of International Men's Day in Cayman.

==== Colombia ====
In Colombia, Men's Day is celebrated on 19 March, the same day that Spain celebrates Father's Day. Men's Day is not internationally recognised nor does it have a confirmed date on the calendar.

==== Cuba ====
Cuba held its inaugural IMD observations on 19 November 2011. In 2012, the Sculpture Workshop Gallery of Rita Longa was nominated as a weekend space for reflections on the International Day of Man and on the subject of gender equality. The event was attended by members of the Cuban Association of Agricultural and Forestry Technicians (ACTAF) and the Union of Writers and Artists of Cuba (UNEAC), along with nongovernmental organisations (NGOs) who decided to pool efforts with the two major social programs offices. Othoniel Morffis Valera, director of the main institution hosting the event and cultural project coordinator Alley Ceiba, offered their reflections about observing the date for the second time, both in this city and in the capital Havana.

==== Grenada ====
In 2010, during Plenary of the Thirty-Fifth assembly of the Inter-American Commission of Women (CIM), Ambassador Gillian Bristol presented a national report reiterating Grenada's commitment to gender equality and its decision to celebrate International Men's Day with various activities which include an address to the nation by Prime Minister Tillman Thomas on 19 November 2010.

==== Jamaica ====
Jamaicans held an inaugural IMD observation on 19 November 2001, with a church service at Northgate Family Church in Ocho Rios, an educational session with male students at Ferncourt High School, and public forum at Brown's Town Community College. Keynote speaker at the event was Luciano who talked on the theme of 'Today's Man, Tomorrow's Future'. A special theme of the event was discussions on men's sexual health and reproduction. Nurse Bunnaman of the Beth Jacobs Family Planning Clinic in Saint Ann's Bay told The Jamaica Star newspaper, "This is the first time that Jamaica will be observing International Men's Day. It was started in Trinidad in 1999. This year it will be observed in Kenya, Tanzania, Norway, Brazil, Germany, Britain and the United States of America as well." Educational sessions about men's sexual health and reproduction were held by the Beth Jacobs Clinic, where medical check-ups and testicular checks were given free of charge.

==== Trinidad and Tobago ====
Citizens in Trinidad and Tobago were the first to observe IMD on 19 November 1999. The event was conceived and coordinated by Dr Jerome Teelucksingh from The University of the West Indies at the Families in Action headquarters in Newtown. As his rationale for creating the event Dr Teelucksingh stated, "I realized there was no day for men... some have said that there is Father's Day, but what about young boys, teenagers and men who are not fathers?" Dr Teelucksingh, understanding the importance of celebrating good male role models, felt that his own father had been an example of an excellent role model and so chose 19 November partly because this was his father's birthday, and also because it was the date on which a local sporting team in his country created a level of unity with transcended gender, religious and ethnic divisions. The idea of celebrating an International Men's Day received written support from officials in UNESCO and the event has continued to be celebrated annually in Trinidad and Tobago and other countries since its beginning.

==== Saint Kitts and Nevis ====
International Men's Day was inaugurated in St. Kitts and Nevis on 19 November 2010. The Ministry of Community Development, Culture and Gender Affairs is using the occasion of International Men's Day to highlight issues affecting and involving men. International Men's Day was observed on Friday and a few activities, such as a health fair, a church service and a panel discussion on general men's issues were organised by the ministry. Sharon Rattan, acting permanent secretary in the Ministry of Gender Affairs said the Gender Affairs Department wants to reach out more to men as previously they focused mostly on women issues. Rattan told WINN FM that it was their hope to use the opportunity to gather more information about the issues affecting men to guide their plan of action in the future. "We are trying to get men together and engage their minds on the issues that affect them so that we can go forward and support them", Rattan said, adding that the programs would also cater to young boys.

==== Saint Lucia ====
In 2011, the St Lucia Crisis Center organised an IMD awareness campaign. Organisers disseminated information about the event and its objectives to media and within educational facilities.

In 2014, the Government of St Lucia held an IMD event at the auditorium of the Wellness Centre on the Millennium Highway where men of all ages were invited to attend. The event was geared at recognising and celebrating the achievements of men and boys, and was titled "Appreciating Men's Leadership and Sacrifice for Family and Country". It was organised by the Division of Gender Relations in the Ministry of Health, included a focus on men's and boy's health, improving gender relations, promoting gender equality and developing positive male role models, and highlighted discriminations against men.

==== United States ====
The following states have recognised International Men's Day: Pennsylvania, New York, Iowa, Illinois, Virginia, Hawaii, Florida, California, Arizona, Alabama, and Michigan. In addition, the following cities have also recognised the holiday: Washington, D.C.; Dallas, Texas; and Atlanta, Georgia.

=== Asia ===
==== China ====
In Hong Kong in 2010 special observances of International Men's Day occurred on 19 November, with the theme "Blessed Are The Men". All men were invited to ride for free in the city's Ngong Ping 360 Tung Chung cable cars for a round-trip on 19 November. In the same year an article in China Daily on 3 August asked whether men in China needed their own special day, citing the fact that on International Women's Day all women in China, who accounted for 45 percent of the workforce, get a mandatory half day off by their employer while men had no such day. The article reported on an online survey done by Shanghai Hotline asking "Do men need a holiday for themselves?" – to which 80.24 percent of respondents said "yes" with many insisting that Shanghai men are tired and deserve a holiday.

==== India ====
The inaugural celebration of IMD in India was organised by the leading Indian Men's rights organisation Indian Family on 19 November 2007. The date of 19 November was accepted based on the fact that Australia and the West Indies (Jamaica, Trinidad and Tobago) were already observing IMD on that date. The event was again celebrated in India in 2008, and plans were made to continue the celebration annually.

In 2009, India received the first corporate sponsorship of the International Men's Day with menswear brand Allen Solly deciding to create promotional offers on IMD, and HBO deciding to screen male-positive movies in its "Men in Black" series on 19 November. In 2014, Confidare Education Consultancy hosted an International Men's Day art gallery in New Delhi, while in Kolkata protests were held to highlight men's rights and abuse of the elderly. Other men's rights activists posed questions on the occasion of IMD, questioning the lack of gender neutrality in laws about domestic violence and child custody. The Chennai chapter of All India Men's Welfare Association (AIMWA) submitted a memorandum to the government on IMD 2014, demanding the establishment of a Men's Welfare Ministry, National Commission for Men, and making all laws gender neutral.

In 2018, Avijan, a welfare and charitable trust for men, organised a protest in Kolkata to demand gender neutrality in law, a men's commission in India, repealing of Section 498A of the Indian Penal Code, and strong action against misuse of the rape law.

==== Pakistan ====
Pakistani Human Rights organisation 'Rights and Rights' inaugurated International Men's Day in Muzaffargarh in 2010. Rights and Rights Founder Yousaf Jamal reported that around 100 people attended, with many lawyers, educationists, social activists and representatives of Women's organisations attending the seminar. Special tributes were paid to prominent male role models. Jamal was under the impression that in Pakistan over the last few years a lot of feminist organisations paint the whole male gender as cruel, and likewise in some prevailing laws there are discriminatory clauses against men, particularly in Family Law and Harassment in the Work Place Act. Jamal paid reference to the steady decline of male participation at Higher Education and University level, citing student numbers in Karachi University as 90% female, in Punjab University 70% female, and in BZ University 52% female. Mr Jamal spoke of the importance of gender cooperation in tackling various problems faced by males and females and cautioned that we should avoid the "Each gender for itself" approach and instead promote better gender relationships. He proposed that all people should celebrate both Men's Day and Women's Day and asked everyone to join with Rights and Rights International for the elimination of Gender Based Discrimination.

==== Singapore ====
In 2008, a 19–21 November IMD event was organised in Singapore. The Adam Association organised a forum—Definition of a Man—which identified various problems men face at home such as communication issues, and how to overcome them. Held in Malay, speakers included Maliki Osman, Parliamentary Secretary for National Development, and staff members from the Registry of Marriages. The forum was open to the public for free and was held at the Darussalam mosque along Commonwealth Avenue West. Another event, also part of International Men's Day, was the Admiralty Baby Genius and Kids' Fashion contest, held on Sunday at Woodlands. Jointly organised by Adam Association and Ace the Place Community Club Management Committee, activities included a diaper-changing contest for fathers.

In 2009, the National Family Council launched the Singapore Dads for Life movement to support a man's role in co-parenting. As part of the event volunteers distributed men's 'toolkits' at more than 30 locations to mark International Men's Day. Another organisation, the Father's Action Network (FAN) also handed out "Dads for Life" toolkits and asked people to share personal stories of fatherhood which were placed online.

=== Europe ===
==== Bosnia and Herzegovina ====
In 2011, The Society Development Association "Kap" initiated an inaugural International Men's Day programme for Bosnia and Herzegovina on 19 November. The goal of the public media campaign was to raise awareness about the health of men and boys, with other goals being the promotion of gender equality through a dialogue and common marking of this date, and noting positive male role models using examples from different areas of society.

==== Denmark ====
Men in Denmark formed a group which planned to hold their own International Men's Day celebration on 19 November 2010. The group's spokesman Martin Pavón said that IMD is not a political counterpart of Women's Day, nor in opposition to women. He stated, "We want to take this opportunity to promote everyday ordinary men who live clean and honest lives and contribute positively to society".

==== France ====
In France, Discovery Channel launched a moustache-growing competition for 2010 International Men's Day, with prizes given to the winners on 19 November. The competition winners are decided by popular public vote.

==== Hungary ====
In November 2009, writer Marie Clarence organised the inaugural IMD celebration for Hungary. Clarence organised the event to promote gender balance and gender equity. The celebration was held in Budapest and the UNESCO Cultural Committee Chairman of Hungary Michael Hoppal gave the opening speech. The event included celebration of local culture, including dancing and forum discussions which highlighted men's achievements and contributions to the world.

==== Ireland ====
To celebrate International Men's Day on Thursday 19 November 2009, Irish broadcaster Newstalk devoted a day-long show to men. The show was hosted by Tom Dunne and was Ireland's first ever observation of the event. Topics included discussion of how 'Men Sheds' contribute to improving men's health, and of their popularity in Ireland. In 2011 Men in Childcare Network Ireland and Men in Childcare Europe, a European network made up of Men in Childcare networks from individual EU member countries, hosted a European conference on "Reimagining Childhood Care & Education" A celebration of Universal Children's Day, and International Men's Day. The event called 'Reimagining Childhood Care and Education' took place in Ireland on Saturday 19 November 2011 at the City West Hotel, Dublin. Also in 2011 the Raphoe Family Resource Centre hosted an event with different groups in order to focus on the value of, and highlighting the positive contribution that men make. Children were invited to offer poems or stories about their fathers, grandfathers, uncles or big brothers which were put on display all week to show the men in families how important they are to others.

==== Isle of Man ====
The Isle of Man celebrated its inaugural celebration in 2012 at the Isle of Man College of Higher education on 19 November 2012. The organisation emphasised the 2012 theme which highlighted World Health Organization figures showing that every year over half a million people die from violence and 83% of them are men and boys, and that a similar proportion of the global burden of disease (ill-health, disability or early death) from violence is borne by males.

On 19 November 2014, a total of 110 men took part in an all-male class at the National Sports Centre in Douglas, which set the new world record for the Largest male yoga class, according to the World Record Academy.

==== Italy ====
On 19 November, several activists rallied outside the Colosseum as part of their IMD celebration. This was the very first observation of 19 November IMD in Italy.

==== Malta ====
International Men's Day has been celebrated in Malta by the Association for Men's Rights since 1994. AMR founder and director John Zammit conceived the event which has been held yearly in the form of a dinner, lunch or reception for AMR members and public. On this occasion awards are given to individuals who have made distinctive contributions men's rights such as, for example, efforts made by committee members "for the removal of the impediment of departure which we had on men in separation/divorce cases. Before 1995 all men who had problems with their wives in Malta, be it Maltese or foreigners, could not leave the island while their case was still in court and so were imprisoned in Malta." The Malta event has traditionally been observed on 7 February since 1994, making it the longest running local IMD observation in the world. As the February date is not celebrated by other participating countries and did not qualify as an internationally observed date, discussions were undertaken within the Maltese Association for Men's Rights, and on 17 January 2009, the committee voted unanimously to shift their celebrations to 19 November to coincide with all the others around the world.

==== Romania ====
As of 19 November 2016, Romania will officially celebrate the "national men's day". The law declaring 19 November as the national men's day was passed on 2 February 2016 by the Romanian parliament. Romania is the first country to officially recognise and celebrate this as a national day. National women's day is also held on 8 March.

==== Ukraine ====
On 16 November 2012, the Ukrainian News Agency held a 'Meet the Press' event entitled "International Men's Day: Aspects Of Health And Longevity". The event was Ukraine's inaugural recognition of the global occasion. The panelists were S. P. Pasechnikov, a professor, doctor of medical sciences, an Honored Scientist of Ukraine, the chief urologist of the Health Ministry of Ukraine, and the head of the department of urology at the Bohomolets National Medical University; O. V. Shvets, an associate professor, a doctor of medical sciences, the president of the Ukrainian Association of Dietitians, and the chief nutritionist of the Health Ministry of Ukraine; Denys Sylantyev, an honored master of sports in swimming, a world champion, a European champion, a public activist, and the founder of the Foundation for Support of Youth and Olympic Swimming; and A. E. Markov, a doctor of medical sciences and GlaxoSmithKline's regional medical director for Ukraine, Belarus, Moldova, and the Caucasus. Themes discussed included healthy lifestyle as the basis for good health; Healthy eating and complete diet; The particulars and maintenance of health and quality of life from the viewpoint of urology; The role of the environment and social initiatives; and The expansion of the Orange Card social program – new opportunities for Ukrainian men.

==== United Kingdom ====
In England (and the UK) the event was formally inaugurated in 2008 by University of Kent students who celebrated International Men's Day the university campus on 19 November 2008. This event was organized and coordinated by the Kent University student group 'The Bishopden Boys'. The Bishopden boys were a Kent Union charitable group, located in Bishopden court, which raises money for various charities each year. Activities for IMD night included 7 a side football tournament, comedy acts and a live music festival, fronted by the student band "Jad". There was a raffle, a guitar hero competition and an Xbox 360 tournament to raise money. All proceeds raised went to ORCHID a charity for all male cancers, including prostate, penile or testicular cancer.

Since 2010, the International Men's Day UK platform has been officially organised (stemming from an event organised in England). It is managed by the charity, Association of Male Health and Wellbeing (formerly called the Men and Boys Coalition) with Mark Brooks taking the lead on this.

In 2014, over 25 organisations held events across the UK – including two in the House of Commons. This was continued in 2015 where Philip Davies MP introduced a debate in the Palace of Westminster about men's issues on 19 November. The day was endorsed by the then prime minister Theresa May and subsequently by Boris Johnson. In 2016, over 60 events were held. 2018 was the biggest International Men's Day to date in the UK, with more than 200 events, campaigns and celebrations held. In 2019, the themes encouraged people and organised to "Make A Difference" and "Give men and boys better life chances" and again, over 200 events took place.

In 2022, an estimated 600 organisations were involved, there were over 100,000 tweets (#internationalmensday) alongside another Parliamentary Debate. The same happened in 2023 with an increase in the number of organisations now taking part.

England

In England (and the UK) the event was inaugurated in 2008 by University of Kent student group 'The Bishopden Boys', who celebrated International Men's Day on the university campus on 19 November 2008.

In November 2010, the Brighton Men's Network organised an IMD conference event for the city of Brighton for professionals, experts and people interested in helping the city in improving services for men and boys. In Hartlepool, Rossmere Youth Centre hosted an IMD evening for boys and girls between the ages of 13 and 19 focused on health, gender equality and promoting male role models. Organisations Springboard, Nacro and Jobsmart attended to give information and advice on training opportunities. On 19 November 2010, Tiemo Entertainment sponsored a 'Celebration of Men Dinner' in London's Hotel Ibis in Euston, with keynote speaker Damion Queva, publisher of Fathers Quarterly magazine. Discussions were conducted on the topic, "What is the purpose of International Men's Day?".

Planned events to mark IMD at the University of York in 2015 were cancelled by the university, after pressure from about 200 members of staff, students, and alumni, who signed an open letter on 13 November. The letter argued that "A day that celebrates men's issues... does not combat inequality, but merely amplifies existing, structurally imposed, inequalities", characterising a statement from the university's equality and diversity committee in support of the event as "particularly crass in view of the fact that of the 12-strong university senior management group, three-quarters are male". Subsequently, the university made no plans to mark the event in 2016, despite a counter-petition which attracted 4,261 supporters.

Northern Ireland

In Northern Ireland, the Deputy Mayor of Newry and Mourne Council, Cllr Karen McKevitt, launched the Magnet Young Men's Health Event, on Friday 19 November 2010. The event was attended by men from across the district and representatives from local statutory, voluntary and community organisations were organised to celebrate 19 November as International Men's Day. Deputy Mayor, Cllr McKevitt said, 'It is a great idea to give an issue that has an international perspective a local focus. All men need to look after their health and take advantage of the services and help that is out there, as we all do. But it is particularly good to see an event that looks at the barriers that young men may be facing and brings together people from all organisations across the district to look at what can be done to work together to make things better.' The event offered opportunities for men to have health checks with experienced staff from Action Cancer, and speakers shared insight into the choices young men make and the opportunities that are out there for young men today. Also in attendance was Jerome Burns, Assistant Director, Department for Social Development.

Scotland

IMD was inaugurated in Scotland in 2010. The event was endorsed by the Government of Scotland and by the Men's Health Forum of Scotland (MHFS). The MHFS celebrated the day with a roundtable event to promote the health and wellbeing of men and boys by bringing together key people and organisations. The focus of the event was to discuss the rationale for developing a national men's health policy in Scotland. The event took place at Elliot House, the office of NHS Quality Improvement Scotland (QIS) in Edinburgh, where there were representations from Scottish Government, NHS leads and directors in the Voluntary Health Sector who discussed the issues and set up a short-term task group to take this work forward. Jim Leishman, men's health coordinator, NHS Forth Valley said, "This event was a huge opportunity to drive through improvements in men's health in Scotland."

Wales

In 2011, the Welsh Government was accused by Tory councillor Peter Davies (father of MP Philip Davies) of sex discrimination for supporting International Women's Day with grants totalling £30,000 while ignoring International Men's Day. Davies stated, "I don't particularly object to the Welsh Government spending money on International Women's Day, but I would have thought that with its commitment to equality it would also be happy to recognise International Men's Day, which will be celebrated this Saturday."

=== Oceania ===
==== Australia ====
Some Australians have celebrated IMD on 19 November since 2003, when Phil Gouldson of Men's Health and Wellbeing Association ACT (MHWA) launched the inaugural event after receiving an invitation by Trinidad and Tobago's Harrack Balramsingh to join in the event. In Canberra, 2004, Gouldson asked men in Australia to wear a red rose for IMD and for women and families to buy the men in their life flowers. He said a red rose is worn by men on IMD as a symbol of strength of character and courage, and as it is unusual to see men being given flowers so it is a good way to highlight the occasion. In 2004, Michael Flood, an academic, criticised the basis of the 'Men's Health and Wellbeing Association' (MHWA)'s IMD celebration which focused on men's health, arguing that there were already enough opportunities to work on men's health and fatherhood (citing Father's Day and Men's Health Week). Gouldson responded, reminding that, "Not all men and boys are fathers, while Men's Health Week focuses on claimed inadequacies of men in not better managing their health." Teelucksingh independently highlighted the need to address the needs of young boys, teenagers and men who are not fathers, which was one of his primary purposes for establishing International Men's Day.

In 2008, Dads4Kids Organisation highlighted the theme 'honour and sacrifice', pointing to the sinking of the cruiser HMAS Sydney on 19 November during the Second World War which resulted in the death of 645 men off the coast of Geraldton in Western Australia. Organisers said, "men make sacrifices every day in their place of work, in their role as husbands and fathers, for their families, for their friends, for their communities and for their nation."

In 2009, a number of events were held throughout Australia including IMD initiatives organised by four local governments: Maitland City Council in NSW, Greater Hume Shire Council in Victoria, Ipswich City Council in Queensland, and Forbes Shire Council in NSW each of whom funded local observations. These were the first government bodies in Australia to fund and host community IMD events. In the State Parliament of Western Australia Minister Nick Goiran gave a speech introducing International Men's Day and its objectives to the parliament, focussing on the promotion of gender equality and the importance of highlighting positive male role models. There was also an event held in the Federal Australian Parliament House with several notable speakers. Numerous other organisations hosted observations including the Men's Shed Steering Committee in Rockhampton, the Community Resource center in Ulladulla, the Regional Health Service in Koo Wee Rup, and Dads on the Air radio programme in Sydney which hosted an hour-long programme discussing IMD with a panel of international coordinators of the event.

In honour of men and boys on the occasion of IMD 2014, Liz Behjat addressed the Western Australian Legislative Council on the topic of men's lives and issues.

Several men's health organizations have sought to distance themselves from Dads4Kids on the event on International Men's Day due to the group's espousal of anti-feminist and anti-LGBTQ+ views.

==== New Zealand ====
In 2018, the Canterbury Men's Centre promoted men's day in New Zealand.

== See also ==
- International Men's Health Week
- Movember
- Tango no Sekku, formerly celebrated as Boys' Day in Japan
- White Ribbon Day, 25 November, male role-modelling to end male violence against women and girls
- International Day of the Boy Child, 16 May
