= LGBTQ people in Argentina =

LGBT in Argentina

LGBT in Argentina refers to the diversity of practices, militancies and cultural assessments on sexual diversity that were historically deployed in the territory that is currently the Argentine Republic. It is particularly difficult to find information on the incidence of homosexuality in societies from Hispanic America as a result of the anti-homosexual taboo derived from Christian morality, so most of the historical sources of its existence are found in acts of repression and punishment. One of the main conflicts encountered by LGBT history researchers is the use of modern concepts that were non-existent to people from the past, such as "homosexual", "transgender" and "travesti", falling into an anachronism. Non-heterosexuality was historically characterized as a public enemy: when power was exercised by the Catholic Church, it was regarded as a sin; during the late 19th and early 20th centuries, when it was in the hands of positivist thought, it was viewed as a disease; and later, with the advent of civil society, it became a crime.

According to the Pew Research Center, 76% of Argentine people believe homosexuality should be accepted in society as of 2020, the highest-ranking Latin American country in the list. In 2021, a survey conducted by Ipsos found that 69% of the Argentine population support LGBT visibility and equality, the highest number on the list after Spain's 73%. The country—especially Buenos Aires—is regarded as a top destination for LGBT tourism, and in 2020, the Spartacus International Gay Guide listed it as the fifth most gay-friendly travel destination, the highest-ranking country in Latin America and second in the Americas after Canada.

== History ==
The indigenous peoples of the pre-Columbian era had practices and assessments on sexuality that differed from those of the Spanish conquistadors, who used their sinful "sodomy" to justify their barbarism and extermination.

In the late 1960s and early 1970s, the first activist groups of the country appeared, most notably the leftist Frente de Liberación Homosexual (FLH), whose immediate forebear was Nuestro Mundo, the first gay rights organization in Latin America. The arrival of the last civic-military dictatorship in 1976—with its subsequent intensification of state terrorism—dissolved these activist efforts, and the local movement often denounces that there were at least four hundred LGBT people among the desaparecidos. The end of military rule in 1983 was followed by a flourishing of lesbian and gay life in the country which, combined with the continued repression, resulted in a resurgence of activism, within which the role of Carlos Jáuregui and the Comunidad Homosexual Argentina (CHA) stood out.

During the 1990s, the local LGBT activism continued to expand, and the first pride marches of the country took place. During the decade, the travesti and transgender rights movement emerged, spearheaded by figures such as Mariela Muñoz, Karina Urbina, Lohana Berkins, María Belén Correa and Claudia Pía Baudracco. Through the 1980s and until the mid-1990s, the nascent LGBT movement was primarily concerned with issues such as homophobia, police violence, and the HIV/AIDS pandemic. One of its first great achievements was the repeal of police edicts (Spanish: edictos policiales) in 1996, used by the Federal Police to arrest LGBT people. In 2000, a civil union bill was introduced in the Buenos Aires legislature, and two years later the city was first in the region to have a law granting legal recognition to same-sex couples.

In the early 2010s, Argentina established itself as a pioneering country in terms of LGBT rights, with the passing of the Equal Marriage Law (Spanish: Ley de Matrimonio Igualitario) in 2010—becoming the tenth country to do so—and the Gender Identity Law (Spanish: Ley de Identidad de Género) in 2012—which allows people to officially change their gender identities without facing barriers such as hormone therapy, surgery, psychiatric diagnosis or judge approval. The country has had an official ministry of Women, Genders and Diversity. In 2021, the Cupo Laboral Trans law was passed—which established a 1% quota for trans workers in civil service jobs— and the country became the first in Latin America to recognise non-binary gender identities in its national identification cards and passports.

== Health ==
=== Housing ===
Access to housing is one of the problems that most affects the travesti and trans women community. In Buenos Aires, 65.1% of travestis and trans women live in rental rooms in hotels, private houses, pensions or apartments, whether authorized by the competent body or "taken" by those who manage them irregularly. According to a study carried out by INDEC and INADI in 2012, 46% of the travesti and trans women population in Argentina lived in deficit housing, while another study carried out by ATTTA and Fundacion Huesped in 2014 indicated that one third of them lived in poor households, particularly in the Northwest region of the country.

=== Violence ===
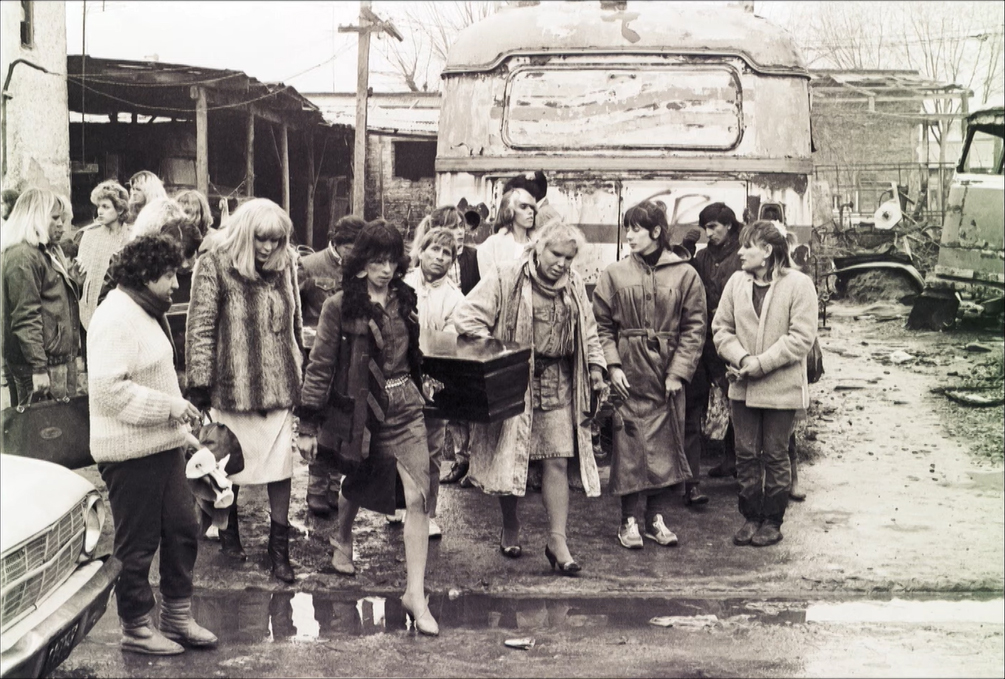
A group of travestis carrying the coffin of one of their murdered friends in the Buenos Aires Metropolitan Area, August 1987.

According to the FALGBT and the Buenos Aires ombudsman Defensoría del Pueblo, 152 hate crimes against LGBT people occurred in Argentina in 2020, with 84% of the cases corresponding to travestis and trans women, followed by cisgender gay men with 12%, lesbians with 4% and trans men with 2%. Of all the hate crimes registered, 57% of the cases (86) were injuries to the right to life, while the remaining 43% of the cases (66) were injuries to the right to physical integrity, that is, physical violence that did not result in death. Regarding the geographical distribution of these hate crimes, the highest percentage occurred in the Buenos Aires Province with 34.21%; followed by the Autonomous City of Buenos Aires with 14.47%; then Córdoba Province with 8.55%; and later Santa Fe Province with 6.58%. In fifth place, 5.92% of the total cases took place in Salta Province; followed by the provinces of Catamarca, Jujuy, Tucumán and Santiago del Estero with 3.95% each; then with 1.97% each, the provinces of Misiones and Mendoza. They are followed by the provinces of Chaco, La Rioja, Entre Ríos, San Juan and Santa Cruz with 1.32%. Finally, with 0.66% representing one case per province: San Luis, Corrientes, Neuquén and Chubut. In 1.32% of the cases, there is no record of the geographic location where the events occurred.

According to a 2017 research published by the Ministry of Defense of Buenos Aires titled La revolución de las mariposas, 74.6% of trans women and travestis in the city said they had suffered some type of violence, a high number, although lower than that registered in 2005, which was 91.9%. The same study indicated that they die on average at the age of 32, well below the average life expectancy of the country. Lohana Berkins reflected in 2015: "Reaching old age is for a travesti like belonging to an exclusive club, because the mishaps that accompany marginal life—which lead to a death that is always considered premature in terms of population statistics—are the perennial consequences of a persecuted identity." In recent times, the concept of "travesticide" (Spanish: travesticidio)—along with "transfemicide" or "trans femicide"— has been extended to refer to the hate crime understood as the murder of a travesti due to her gender condition. In 2015, the murder case of activist Diana Sacayán became the first precedent in Argentina and in Latin America to be criminally judged as a "travesticide". According to Blas Radi and Alejandra Sardá-Chandiramani:

Travesticide/transfemicide is the end of a continuum of violence that begins with the expulsion of home, exclusion from education, the health system and labor market, early initiation into prostitution/sex work, the permanent risk of contracting sexually transmitted diseases, criminalization, social stigmatization, pathologization, persecution and police violence. This pattern of violence constitutes the space of experience for trans women and travesties, which is mirrored in their waning horizon of expectations. In it, death is nothing extraordinary; on the contrary, in the words of Octavio Paz "life and death are inseparable, and each time the first loses significance, the second becomes insignificant".

=== Work ===
According to La revolución de las mariposas, 88% of travestis and trans women from Buenos Aires never had a formal job, while 51.5% never had a job of any kind. 70.4% of those surveyed said they earned their living from prostitution, and of this group, 75.7% had been doing so from an age less than or equal to 18 years. 87.2% of these travesti and trans women surveyed who currently work as prostitutes wish to leave the activity if they were to be offered a job. The expulsion of travestis from the educational system is a necessary element to understand the use of prostitution as an almost exclusive means of support, since the "hostile circumstances that mark the schooling experience of the majority of travesti girls and adolescents severely condition the possibilities of these subjects in terms of social inclusion and access to quality employment in adulthood."

== Observances ==
In 2012, the legislature of the city of Buenos Aires established August 20 as the Day of Activism for Sexual Diversity in Argentina, in memory of activist Carlos Jauregui and his contributions to the LGBT community.

Since 2013, the Argentine Lesbian Visibility Day is celebrated on March 5, in memory of the murder Natalia "Pepa" Gaitán, killed by a shotgun in the chest by her girlfriend's stepfather that day in 2010.

In the city of Buenos Aires, the Day for the Promotion of the Rights of Trans People is commemorated every year on March 18 since 2014, a date instituted to commemorate the death of activist Claudia Pía Baudracco. The initiative was replicated by the legislatures of the city of Córdoba and of Santa Fe Province in 2016, and of Río Negro Province in 2020.

== Arts and culture ==
=== Archives ===
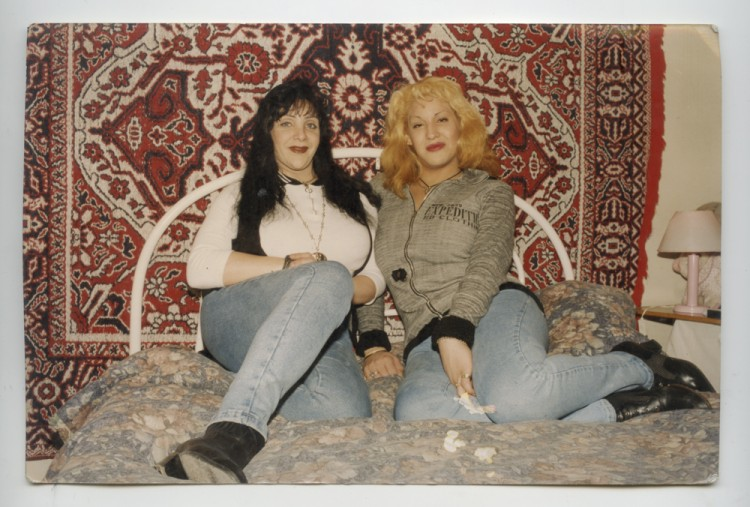
Claudia Pía Baudracco (left) and María Belén Correa (right) in 1993. Image from the Archivo de la Memoria Trans.

In 2011, the blog Potencia Tortillera (English: "Tortillera (Note: Tortillera (lit. 'tortilla maker') is a word used in several Spanish-speaking countries to refer to lesbian women.) Potency") was created, the first digitized documentary archive of lesbian activisms.

Following the death of fellow activist Claudia Pía Baudracco, María Belén Correa created the Archivo de la Memoria Trans (English: "Archive of Trans Memory") in 2012, which originally began as a Facebook group. It is a unique collective project in the world, dedicated to compiling and recovering the cultural heritage of the Argentine trans community. Correa defined the project as: "the reconstruction of the memories, experiences and past [of trans people], counting on the survivors who are exiled and the few who remain living in Argentina." The archive began to professionalize after the incorporation of the photographer Cecilia Estalles, who prompted Correa to digitize the images.

=== Argot ===
Argentine gay men have developed the so-called "language of the locas" (Spanish: "habla de las locas"), term with which openly effeminate homosexuals were called in the gay scene. A popular term in local gay culture is chongo—the opposite of loca—which refers to masculine, straight passing men. The popularity of the word chongo has extended from the gay community and is currently also used by heterosexual women to refer to men with whom they are sexually attracted.

The Argentine LGBT community uses the pejorative term paqui or paki to refer to heterosexual people. There are different versions regarding the origin of the term, including it being a reference to Plaza de Pakistán—a popular cruising spot for men who have sex with men in Buenos Aires. The word paqui apparently comes from paquidermo, which means "pachyderm" in Spanish. The lesbian community claims to have invented the term in the 1960s, because they saw heterosexuality as "clumsy and boring in bed." Over the years, the term began to be written with the letter k for its association with Plaza de Pakistán, something that has been denounced and resented by lesbian activists.

After travestis and gay men began to be imprisoned during the 1946–1955 government of President Juan Domingo Perón, they developed their own argot known as carrilche, which was nourished by prison jargon. According to anthropologist María Soledad Cutuli, today this jargon is known as the teje and: "consists of taking up elements of prison jargon or "[police] lunfardo", deforming some syllables of certain words, and also using invented terms such as cirilqui to refer to the police, or even the polysemic teje (roughly "weave"), which can mean, depending on the context, 'lie, story, argument, affair.' To say that someone is a tejedora (lit. 'weaver') implies a subtle way of qualifying her as a liar; to ask 'what are they tejiendo?' (lit. 'weaving') refers to assuming that a meeting or conversation may have ulterior motives". Activist Marlene Wayar described the word teje as "the complicit word between us [travestis], which we don't want the other to find out about: bring me the teje, because of the cocaine; or look at the teje, it is when [the client] has a wallet with money. And that is the name of the magazine.

=== Drag queens ===
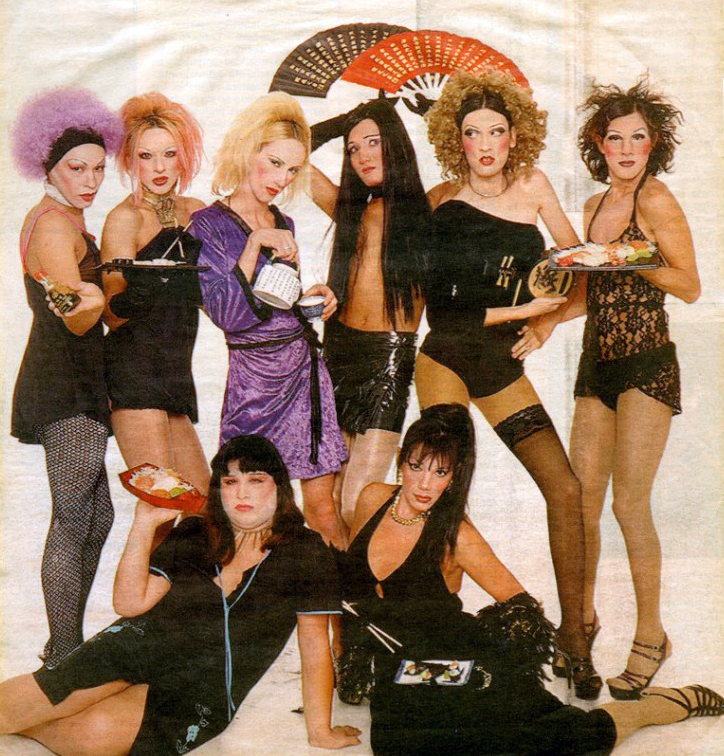
Drag queens from Buenos Aires in 1995, advertising a show in nightclub Morocco.

In the 1990s, drag queens became a fixture in the gay nightlife of Buenos Aires, featured in nightclubs such as El Dorado—the first one to hire drag queens—, Bunker and Morocco. One of the most well-known drag queens of the underground nightlife scene of the 1990s was Charly Darling, who worked as a hostess in clubs such as Morocco, Club 69, Palacio Alsina, Club Namunkurá, Kim & Novak, Shamrock and Cocoliche; as well as a model for photographers and as a muse for artists such as Darin Wixon, Gustavo Di Mario and Marcelo Bosco.

La Barby is a renowned drag queen and comedian influenced by Divine and Lady Bunny, who first rose to prominence in the Buenos Aires gay nightlife in the 1990s. She began her drag career in popular nightclubs from the decade such as Bunker and IV Milenio, and later developed a successful television career.

La Queen is a drag performer from the lower-class neighborhood of Fuerte Apache in Ciudadela, who first rose to prominence as a singer in the trap music scene but has recently moved towards a pop style.

In March 2021, Juego de Reinas, the first drag reality show in Argentine television, aired in Salta's Canal 10 free-to-air channel.

=== Cinema ===
In 1963, French transsexual entertainer Coccinelle caused a media sensation when performing in Buenos Aires and had a minor role in Enrique Carreras' film Los viciosos.

The sexploitation films made by director Armando Bó and actress Isabel Sarli in the 1960s and 1970s are celebrated by the gay community for their camp quality. Their 1969 film Fuego features one of the first representations of lesbianism in Argentine cinema. In addition to being a pop icon and sex symbol, Sarli is recognized as a gay icon. American director John Waters has declared himself a big fan of Sarli's films—including Fuego and Carne—and has cited them as an influence in his work.

=== Literature ===
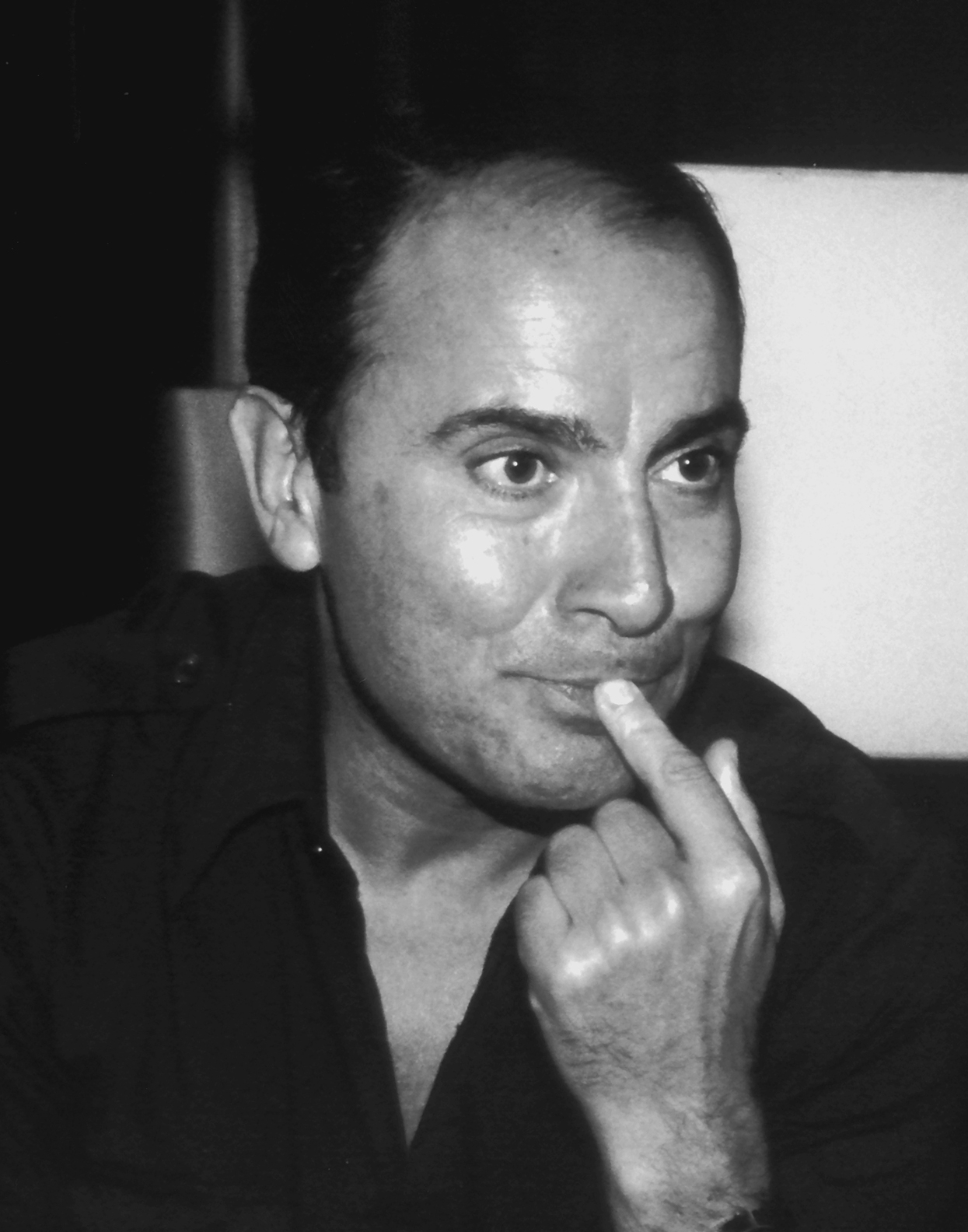
Gay writer Manuel Puig in 1979.

Esteban Echeverría's famous short story El matadero—considered a foundational work in Argentine literature—portrays the federales as bloodthirsty sodomites.

An important starting point for the history of gay literature in Argentina was Carlos Correas' short story "La narración de la historia"—published in magazine Revista Centro in 1959—in which homosexuality does not appear as a pathology but as a normal trait of the main character. The text caused a great scandal, leading to the closure of the magazine and a judicial process for immorality and pornography.

Manuel Puig is a foundational figure in Argentine gay literature and homoeroticism of the second half of the 20th century, especially through his novels La traición de Rita Hayworth, The Buenos Aires Affair and El beso de la mujer araña.

La traición de Rita Hayworth is analyzed as both a chronicle of the 1930s and 1940s culture—the decades in which the fiction takes place—as well as a document of the 1960s, the time when it was published.

The paradigmatic figure of Eva Perón has been a source of fascination for Argentine gay writers.

The work of punk poet Ioshua—who started his writing career in the 2000s and died in 2015—is celebrated for its explicit portrayal of lower-class gay life in the suburbs of Buenos Aires.

=== Tango ===
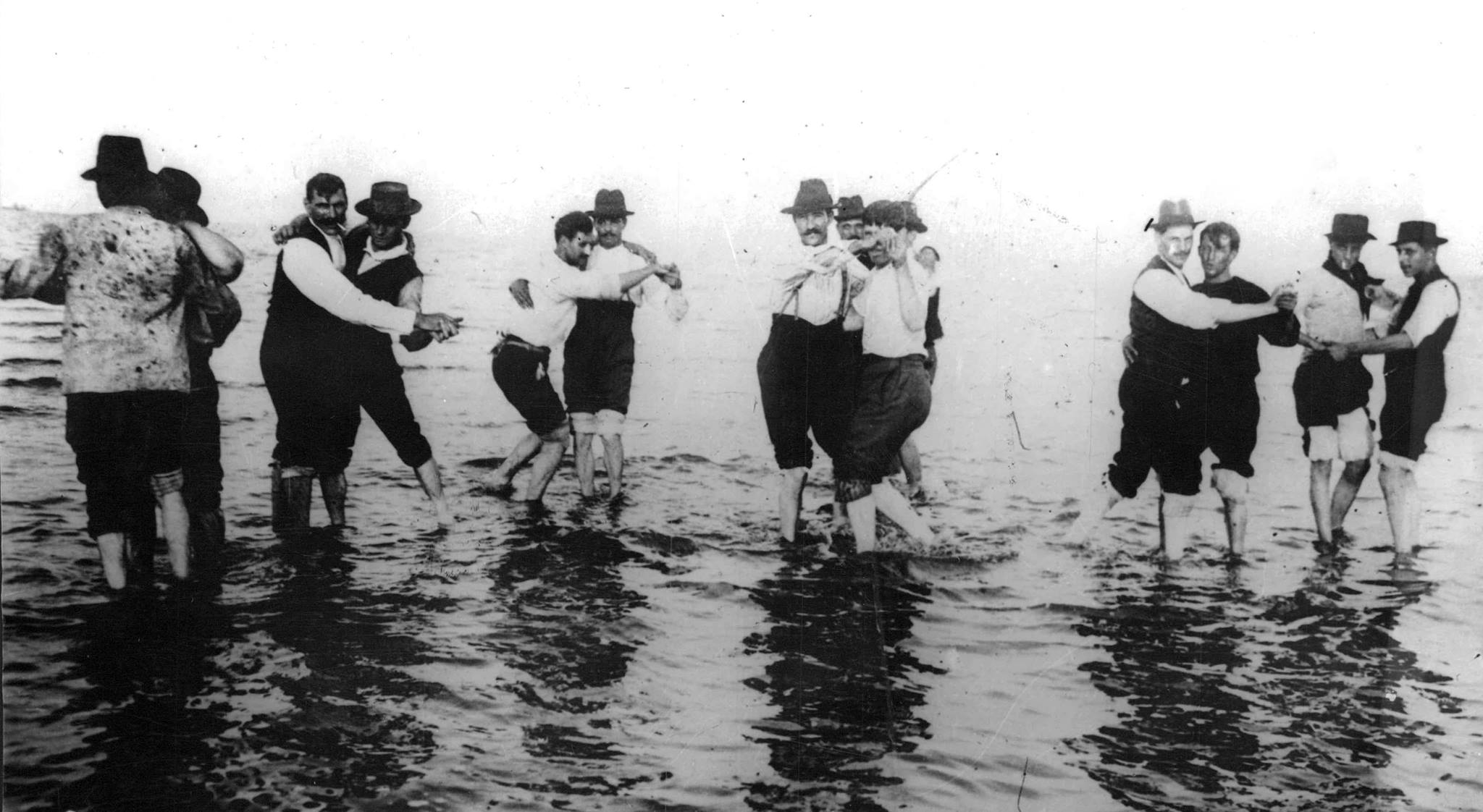
Several men dancing the tango on the banks of the Río de la Plata, 1904.

Many authors argue that the tango was originally danced between men, with a few even suggesting that it was generally a homosexual dance between gay men. This hypothesis is not shared by other authors, for whom the original tango was a heterosexual dance, between a client and a prostitute. The tango emerged at the end of the 19th century in the low-class neighborhoods of southern Buenos Aires, led by the emblematic figure of the compadritos, a subculture of young men that were accused of being faggots (Spanish: "maricas") for their mannered personas and careful personal grooming.

During the so-called "golden age of tango" between the 1940s and 1960s, a more massive and less sexualized form of the dance was popularized, with well-defined gender roles and sexist content in its lyrics.

The early 21st century saw the emergence of the so-called "queer tango" (Spanish: "tango queer"), which signaled a series of cultural changes, related to the greater visibility of sexual minorities, the growing popularity of gay tourism and the recent emergence of young people in the Buenos Aires tango circuit. In queer tango, dancers choose between the traditionally defined feminine or male role, regardless of their actual gender identity.

=== Theatre ===
The first scenic representations of non-heterosexuality in Argentina were tied to the medical and legal paradigm of the early 20th century, in a moralizing and victimizing manner. José González Castillo's famous 1914 play Los invertidos (Spanish for "the inverts") is a prime example.

The 1970s are considered an era of "artistic travesti 'uncover'" (Spanish: "destape"), which began with the arrival of a Brazilian travesti who performed in a well-known theater in Buenos Aires. Her show paved the way to later performances by local travestis. The stage became the only place where travestis could publicly dress as women, as it was forbidden to do so on the streets. Around 1964, travesti artists—at that time named lenci, in reference to a type of cloth, because they "were like little rag dolls"—met at an apartment on Avenida Callao, where they rehearsed musical acts and prepared to go out to theatre shows. Travestis emulated a contoured figure—which emphasized breasts and buttocks—through paddings called truquis, piu-piú or colchón (lit. 'mattress'), first using cotton fabrics and later foam rubber. While padding had been in use since at least the 1950s, the arrival of lycra in the 1960s allowed them to "build more realistic physical contours." María Belén Correa argues that the emergence of travesti stage performers such Vanessa Show, Evelyn, Brigitte Gambini and Ana Lupe Chaparro in the 1960s and 1970s constituted "another way of activism". According to Evelyn—one of the first people to popularize transformismo in the theater scene—the "first travestis to appear in Buenos Aires" were a group called Les Girls in 1972, followed by Vanessa Show and Ana Lupez. She also mentioned the travestis of the "following era", which included Graciela Scott, Claudia Prado and herself, who debuted in 1977.

In the years immediately before and after the end of the dictatorship rule in 1983, a scene known as the "underground" or "counterculture" emerged in Buenos Aires, which housed alternative artistic proposals to the institutional or hegemonic ones. In the theatrical field, pubs, discos and bars formed the off-Corrientes circuit, where some of the performance art of the 1960s and the Di Tella Institute were revived. One of the most prominent spaces of the underground scene was the Parakultural cultural center, which ran between 1986 and 1989.

Through this cultural movement, a greater visibility of homosexual entertainers was seen, including the trio made up of Batato Barea, Humberto Tortonese and Alejandro Urdapilleta, who carried out several of their performances at the Parakultural. Barea's group works were part of the so-called nuevo teatro argentino (English: "new Argentine theatre") movement, characterized by the use of improvisation and a lack of specific authority roles. Barea is regarded as "one of the first figures who contributed to make homoesexuality visible from the aesthetic point of view in a time of repression." He defined himself as a "literary transvestite clown."

In 1995, Cris Miró debuted as a vedette at the Teatro Maipo and caused media sensation for the gender bender aspects of her image. She is now regarded as a symbol of the postmodern era and of the Argentine 1990s. As the first Argentine travesti to become a national celebrity, her presence meant a change in the Argentine showbusiness of the era and popularized transgender and cross-dressing acts in Buenos Aires' revue theatrical scene. She paved the way for other Argentine travestis and trans women to gain popularity as vedettes, most notably Flor de la V.

In 2019, soprano María Castillo de Lima became the first transsexual opera singer to perform at the prestigious Teatro Colón.

=== Periodicals ===
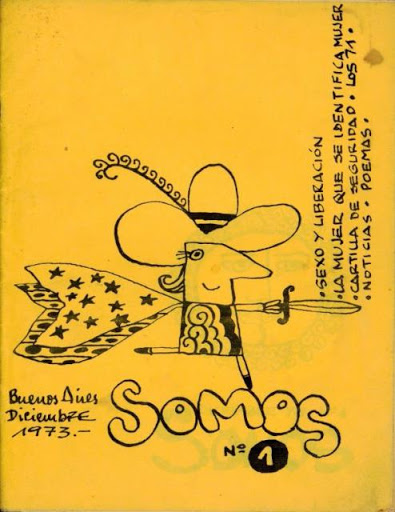
The first issue of clandestine magazine Somos, published by the Frente de Liberación Homosexual in December 1973.

Between 1973 and 1976, the Frente de Liberación Homosexual (FLH; English: "Homosexual Liberation Front") published the magazine Somos (lit. 'we are'), which was edited and distributed clandestinely and featured texts that were either not individually signed or signed with a pseudonym, due to the repression and violence towards homosexuals.

In December 1983, the women's magazine Alfonsina—led by María Moreno—appeared, which featured texts written by prominent figures of the Argentine feminist and lesbian movements.

Between 1984 and 1985, the Grupo de Acción Gay (GAG; English: "Gay Action Group") published the magazine Sodoma, which only had two issues. The publication was mainly in charge of Jorge Gumier Maier and Carlos Luis, with the close collaboration of Elena Napolitano and Néstor Perlongher from Sâo Paulo, Brazil, among other authors.

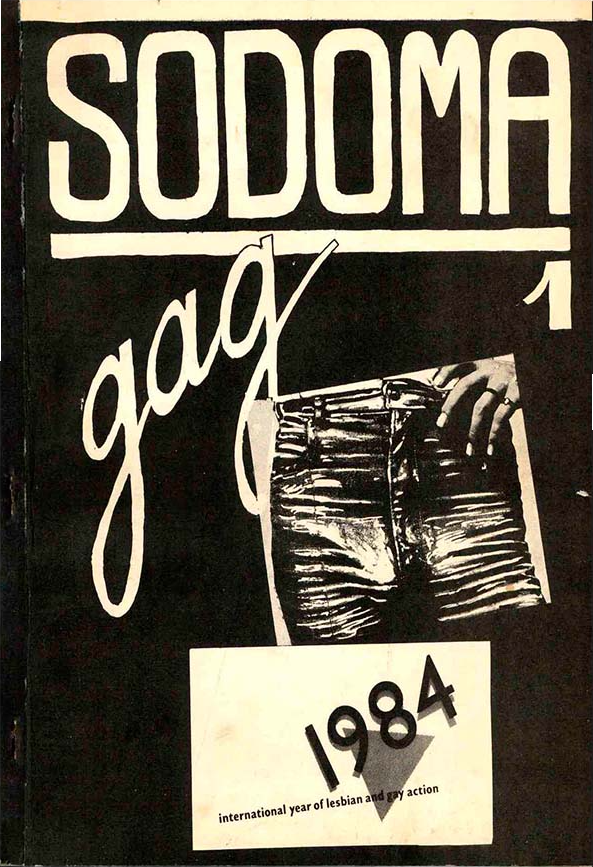
The first issue of Sodoma, published by the Grupo de Acción Gay (GAG) in 1984.

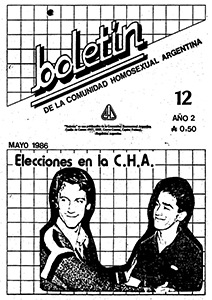
The twelfth issue of the CHA's official bulletin, May 1986.

An important contribution to lesbian activism were the Cuadernos de Existencia Lesbiana (English: "Notebooks of Lesbian Existence"), a project carried out by Ilse Fuskova and Adriana Carrasco between 1987 and 1996 that is considered the first lesbian publication in Argentina, The Cuadernos collected testimonies, photographs, translations and original writings of lesbian literature and news about local and international lesbian life and activism. Influenced by Adrienne Rich, Fuskova and Carrasco conceived the publication as a way to fight against the invisibility and silencing that lesbians suffered in society and within feminism. According to investigator Paula Torricella, "until 1986 the reflection on lesbianism had been very little even within feminist groups, and public demands were not even consolidated until a few years later. There were no networks willing to import foreign material that talked about the subject [and] local production was very scarce without a social movement that nurtured and demanded reflection."

The activist organization Comunidad Homosexual Argentina (CHA; English: "Argentine Homosexual Community") published various magazines and newsletters between 1984 and 1992. The first one was the bulletin Boletín de la CHA—published during Carlos Jáuregui's presidency of the group between 1984 and 1986—which was followed by Vamos a Andar. The CHA simultaneously released other publications, including the weekly Boletín informativo (lit. 'newsletter'), Artículo 19 and Vamos a Andar MUJER.

NX was the most emblematic gay magazine of the 1990s, released continuously and monthly between October 1993 and December 2001. It was the first attempt at lasting gay journalism in Argentina and a model for others in Latin America that imitated its style. The magazine included the publication NX Positivo, with updated information on HIV, means of prevention, and places of consultation and care.

In the early 1990s, transsexual activist Karina Urbina founded the organization TRANSDEVI, which published the bulletin La Voz Transexual (English: "The Transsexual Voice") that, in addition to focusing on transsexuality, included articles on abortion, HIV and the Catholic Church.

Between 1992 and 1996, the magazine Ka-buum was published in New Jersey, U.S. by Sam Larson and distributed by mail to the Latino homosexual community residing in the United States and to activist groups in Latin America—especially Argentina, Chile and Uruguay—and Spain. The magazine featured texts by a variety of international activists, including several from Argentina.

Between 1998 and 1999, the Córdoba-based lesbian group Las Iguanas (lit. 'The Iguanas')—a reference to North American parthenogenetic lizards—published a bulletin of the same name, which they described as: "a meeting space where we can gather to share life stories in relation to our sexual identity."

In November 2007, the first issue of El Teje, the first periodical written by travestis in Latin America, was published in a joint initiative between activists—led by Marlene Wayar— and the Ricardo Rojas Cultural Center in Buenos Aires.

=== Photography ===
Lesbian activist llse Fusková ventured into photography in the early 1980s under the influence and friendship of photographers Grete Stern and Horacio Coppola. Her 1988 photographic series S/T—made alongside Adriana Carrasco, Vanessa Ragone and Marisa Ramos—deal with lesbian desire and shows a couple of women painting their bodies with menstrual blood. Fusková and her group intended to break the use of lesbians as sexual objects for male masturbation.

=== Popular music ===
==== Gay ====
Virus lead singer Federico Moura is one of the first Argentine gay icons of foundational importance, and an emblematic singer in Latin American homosexual culture. Many of Virus' songs subtly made reference to 1980s gay men culture, such as cruising for sex, male prostitution and underground parties; and Moura displayed a flamboyant, sexualized stage persona that caused a homophobic reaction by much of the Argentine rock culture at the time. The most emblematic event took place during the 1981 Prima Rock festival, when they were received with indifference by an audience that threw tomatoes, oranges and other objects at them.

Moura died in 1988 and became the first AIDS-related public death in Argentina.

==== Lesbian ====
Marilina Ross' composition "Puerto Pollensa"—first recorded and popularized by Sandra Mihanovich in 1981—is considered the first Argentine popular song to thematize love between women, although not in an explicit way. It became an enduring gay anthem, especially among the lesbian community, released at a time when the secrecy of non-heterosexual relationships was a source of shared codes and interpretations of cultural products. According to lesbian journalist Marta Dillon: "thirty years later lesbians of all ages continue singing the entire lyrics by heart". "Puerto Pollensa" had an important role in the process of visibility of homosexuality that took place in Argentina after the return to democratic rule in 1983. Ross later recorded her own version of the song and included it in her 1982 album Soles. In contemporary shows and journalistic articles, the songwriter made it clear that "Puerto Pollensa" described a personal experience, although she always refused to reveal the name or gender of her lover. Although she did not publicly deny or affirm her sexual orientation, Mihanovich became a sex symbol for some lesbians and an icon of a burgeoning "gay culture". In 1984, she released "Soy lo que soy", a Spanish-language version of "I Am What I Am", which she discovered in a gay nightclub in Rio de Janeiro when a drag queen performed to Gloria Gaynor's version. Mihanovich's version is regarded as another enduring gay anthem for the local LGBT community, and is played at the end of each Buenos Aires' Pride March. In her 1984 live album Sandra en Shams, female members of the audience can be heard praising the singer's body and, in its autobiographical closing track "La historia de nunca acabar", she sings: "It is not difficult for me to start with men. But I could never...", with the public laughingly shouting "finish" and ending the song.

In the late 1980s, Mihanovich formed the pop duo Sandra y Celeste alongside singer-songwriter Celeste Carballo, with whom she also developed a romantic relationship. The 1990 release of their second studio album Mujer contra mujer is regarded as a landmark for the local lesbian culture, with its title track—a cover version of Mecano—openly dealing with a lesbian relationship. The album is noted for its controversial artwork—depicting both singers naked and embraced— which was wallpapered throughout the city of Buenos Aires as part of its advertising campaign and made great impact. The album's release and promotion discussed and made lesbianism visible in the Argentine society of the time. Their intimate performance of "Mujer contra mujer" in Susana Giménez is also remembered as an iconic moment for lesbian visibility in the country. Carballo famously came out in 1991 when promoting Mujer contra mujer at Juan Alberto Badía's TV show Imagen de radio, telling the host: "Sandra and I love each other". She also stated: "There are many people like me, (...) and they are among us. And there are many who keep their mouths shut and who do not speak and who hide. And there are many girls who paint their nails and it bothers them at night. (...) I understand that people get scared and feel rejection, but it does not seem normal and natural that I always have to speak with second words and never use the correct one because then... I continue to attack this prude and macho society that Argentina really is." On March 7, 2021—the Day of Lesbian Visibility in Argentina—the Kirchner Cultural Centre held a show in tribute to the 30th anniversary of the release of Mujer contra mujer.

Cumbia santafesina singer Dalila is the only cumbia singer with an explicitly lesbian song, titled "Amor entre mujeres". Nevertheless, she disliked the song becoming an anthem for lesbian cumbia fans and refused to sing it at a lesbian party on one occasion, claiming she did not want to "get attached to it."

Modern lesbian musicians include Lucy Patané, Lu Martínez, Flopa, Ibiza Pareo, Juli Laso, Leda Torres, Viviana Scaliza, Larro Carballido, Paula Trama, Inés Copertino, Luciana Jury, Marcia Müller, Juana Chang, Flor Linyera, Juliana Isas, Cata Raybaud, Vale Cini and Cam Bezkin.

=== Politics ===
The first openly LGBT+ member of the National Congress of Argentina was national deputy Marcela Virginia Rodríguez, a lesbian and feminist activist, elected in 2001. Leonardo Grosso and Osvaldo López were the first openly gay men in Congress; both took office in 2011, in the Chamber of Deputies and in the Senate, respectively.

In 2015, Cristina Campos became the first transgender person to be a candidate for provincial senator.

In early 2020, trans woman Alba Rueda was appointed undersecretary of Diversity Policies of the Nation (Spanish: "Políticas de Diversidad de la Nación") within the new Ministry of Women, Genders and Diversity, created as part of President Alberto Fernández's cabinet.

=== Sports ===
In 2020, trans woman Mara Gómez debuted as a forward in Argentine association football, becoming the first transgender athlete to participate in a professional league.

== See also ==
- Feminism in Argentina
- History of Argentina
- LGBT rights in Argentina
- Same-sex marriage in Argentina
- Timeline of LGBT history
- Transgender rights in Argentina

== Bibliography ==
- Bazán, Osvaldo (2010) [1st pub. 2004]. Historia de la homosexualidad en la Argentina (in Spanish) (2nd ed.). Buenos Aires, Argentina: Editorial Marea. ISBN 978-987-1307-35-7.
- Demaría, Gonzalo (February 6, 2020). Cacería (paperback). Colección Andanzas (in Spanish) (1st ed.). Buenos Aires: Editorial Planeta. ISBN 978-950-49-6968-6.
- Fernández, Josefina (2004). Cuerpos desobedientes: travestismo e identidad de género (in Spanish). Buenos Aires: Edhasa. ISBN 950-9009-16-4.
- Mailhe, Alejandra, ed. (2016). Archivos de psiquiatría y criminología (1902-1913): concepciones de la alteridad social y del sujeto femenino (PDF) (in Spanish) (1st ed.). La Plata, Argentina: National University of La Plata. Faculty of Humanities and Education Sciences (FaHCE). ISBN 978-950-34-1430-9.
- Melo, Adrián (2011). Historia de la literatura gay en la argentina: Representaciones sociales de la homosexualidad masculina en la ficción literaria (eBook) (in Spanish). Buenos Aires: Ediciones Lea. ISBN 9789876343510.
- Rapisardi, Flavio; Modarelli, Alejandro (August 2001). Fiestas, baños y exilios: Los gays porteños en la última dictadura (paperback) (in Spanish) (1st ed.). Buenos Aires: Editorial Sudamericana. ISBN 978-9500720922.
- Salessi, Jorge (2000) [1st pub. 1995]. Médicos maleantes y maricas: higiene, criminología y homosexualidad en la construcción de la nación argentina (Buenos Aires, 1871-1914) (in Spanish) (2nd ed.). Buenos Aires, Argentina: Beatriz Viterbo Editora. ISBN 950-845-031-2.
- Sebreli, Juan José (June 1997). "Historia secreta de la homosexualidad en Buenos Aires". Escritos sobre escritos, ciudades bajo ciudades (paperback) (in Spanish) (1st ed.). Buenos Aires: Editorial Sudamericana. pp. 275–370. ISBN 978-950-07-1274-3.
