= Transgender rights in Argentina =

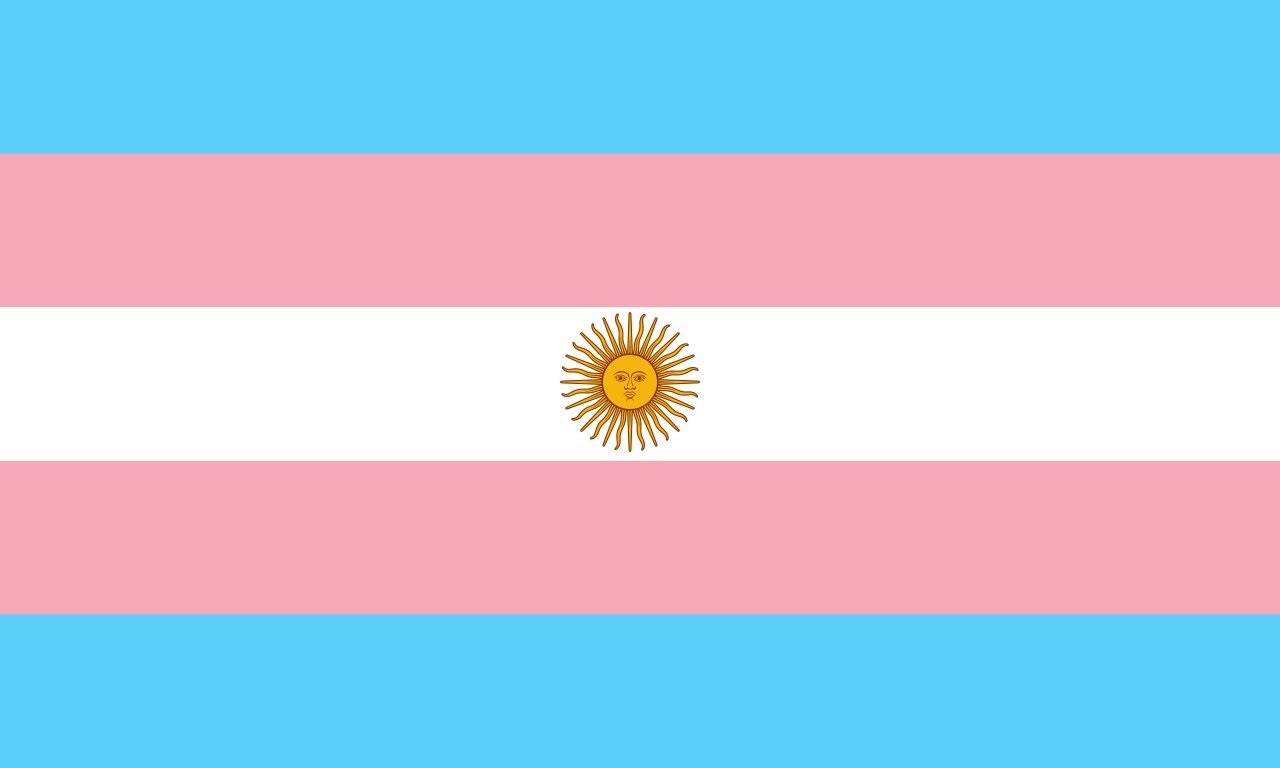
The flag of Argentina merged with the transgender pride flag.

Transgender and travesti rights in Argentina have been lauded by many as some of the world's most progressive. The country "has one of the world's most comprehensive transgender rights laws". The Gender Identity Law, passed in 2012, made Argentina the "only country that allows people to change their gender identities without facing barriers such as hormone therapy, surgery or psychiatric diagnosis that labels them as having an abnormality". In 2015, the World Health Organization cited Argentina as an exemplary country for providing transgender rights. Leading transgender activists include Lohana Berkins, Diana Sacayán, Mariela Muñoz, María Belén Correa, Marlene Wayar, Claudia Pía Baudracco, Susy Shock and Lara Bertolini.

In 2021, the Diana Sacayán–Lohana Berkins Law was passed, which establishes that the national public sector must reserve at least 1% of its positions and vacancies for trans people, and encourages the private sector to take similar measures. Also in 2021, President Alberto Fernández signed the decree 476/2021, mandating the National Registry of Persons (RENAPER) to allow a third gender option on all national identity cards and passports, marked as an "X". In compliance with the Gender Identity Law, this made Argentina one of the few countries in the world to legally recognize non-binary gender on all official documentation.

Currently, Argentine trans activists are pushing for anti-discrimination and employment quota laws, as well as to stop killings of trans people.

The "Day of the Promotion of the Rights of Trans People" is celebrated in the city of Buenos Aires and in Santa Fe Province on March 18, in memory of Baudracco, who had died on that date in 2012.

== History ==
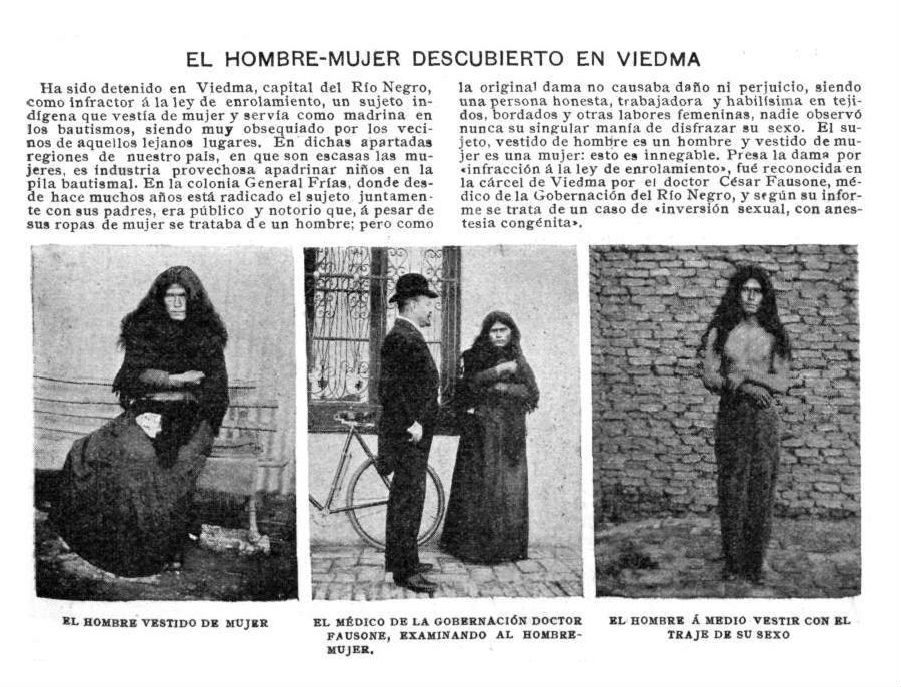
News from Caras y Caretas in 1902, describing the detention of an indigenous "man-woman" in Viedma, Río Negro

In 1997, Asociación de Lucha por la Identidad Travesti-Transsexual was created to defend the rights of transgender people. One of its first victories came in 2006 when the Supreme Court overturned a lower court's ruling that had stated that transgender people did not have a legal right to organize and campaign for their rights.

In 2007, the Supreme Court ruled that a 17-year-old had the legal right to go through the sex change process and have her legal documents changed to reflect the operation.

In 2009, Marcela Romero won the legal right to have her identity changed and was given an honorary title by the government. She was awarded the Honorable Congresswoman of the year. Romero remains one of the leading advocates for the human rights of transgender people in Argentina.

In 2012, senators unanimously approved the "Gender Law".

In mid-2018, the Santa Fe Province cities of Rosario and Santa Fe announced the incorporation of several trans people to the Historical Reparation program, which gives pensions to victims of the last military dictatorship. Newspaper Página/12 considered that "the action, unprecedented at a national level and throughout Latin America, establishes a new standard in public policies."

On June 18, 2018, a Buenos Aires court sentenced Gabriel David Marino to life imprisonment for the murder of transgender activist Diana Sacayán. For the first time in history, the Argentine Justice acknowledged that the murder was "a hate crime against the travesti identity", known as "travesticide" or "transvesticide" (Spanish: travesticidio; a portmanteau of "travesti" and "homicide"). The ruling was widely celebrated by LGBT activists and has been considered "one more example of the [social] changes underway in Argentina."

On March 1, 2019, trans activist Lara María Bertolini was allowed to change her official sex to the transfeminine non-binary label "travesti femininity" through a judicial ruling that was considered a landmark for the travesti movement. Buenos Aires judge Myriam Cataldi felt that the Gender Identity Law applied to Bertolini's case, citing the law's definition of "gender identity" as: "the internal and individual experience of gender as each person feels it, which may or may not correspond to the sex assigned at birth, including the personal experience of the body."

On March 19, 2019, Neuquén Province announced a pension for trans people who are older than forty years and do not have registered employment. They will receive a monthly economic contribution as part of a Historical Reparation program, which "recognizes the systematic violation of their rights".

On July 20, 2021, President Alberto Fernández signed Decreto 476/2021, mandating the National Registry of Persons (RENAPER) to allow a third gender option on all national identity cards and passports, marked as an "X". The measure applies to non-citizen permanent residents who possess Argentine identity cards as well. In compliance with the 2012 Gender Identity Law, this made Argentina one of the few countries in the world to legally recognize non-binary gender on all official documentation. The 2022 national census, carried out less than a year after the resolution was implemented, counted 8,293 (roughly 0.02%) of the country's population identifying with the "X / other" gender marker.

In 2021, Argentina amended its penal code to officially include the crimes of "travesticidios, transhomicidios", and "transfemicidios".

== Gender Identity Law ==
The Ley de Género (Gender Law) grants adults sex reassignment surgery and hormone therapy as a part of their public or private health care plans. The law also allows for changes to gender, image, or birth name on civil registries without the approval of a doctor or a judge. In 2013 a six-year-old transgender girl named Luana became the first transgender child in Argentina to have her new name officially changed on her identity documents. She is believed to be the youngest to benefit from the country's Gender Identity Law.

The law made Argentina the "only country that allows people to change their gender identities without facing barriers such as hormone therapy, surgery or psychiatric diagnosis that labels them as having an abnormality". In 2015, the World Health Organization cited Argentina as an exemplary country for providing transgender rights.

== Trans employment quota in the public sector ==
On 4 September 2020, President Alberto Fernández signed decree 721/2020, which established a 1% employment quota for trans and travesti people in the national public sector. The measure had been previously debated in the Chamber of Deputies as various prospective bills. The decree mandates that at any given point, at least 1% of all public sector workers in the national government must be transgender, as understood in the 2012 Gender Identity Law. The initiative had previously been proposed by Argentine trans and travesti activists such as Diana Sacayán, whose efforts led to the promotion of such laws at the provincial level in Buenos Aires Province in 2015.

On 25 June 2021, the Argentine Senate passed a law mandating the continuity of decree 721/2020. The new law, called Promoción del Acceso al Empleo Formal para personas Travestis, Transexuales y Transgénero "Diana Sacayán–Lohana Berkins" ("Promotion of Access to Formal Employment for Travesti, Transsexual and Transgender People Diana Sacayán – Lohana Berkins"), also establishes economic incentives for businesses in the private sector that employ travesti and trans workers, and gives priority in credit lines to trans-owned small businesses.

== Healthcare restrictions ==
In February 2025, President Javier Milei's government implemented a ban on gender affirming care under the age of 18, as part of Milei's war on "woke ideology". In April 2025, a Federal Court ruled that the ban was unconstitutional, restoring access to care for minors nationwide.

== Prisons ==
In February 2025, Milei's government implemented a ban on being housed in a women's prison for trans women convicted of sexual crimes, human trafficking, or any violent crime against a woman.

== See also ==
- LGBT rights in Argentina
- Legal status of transgender people
- Legal recognition of non-binary gender
- Intersex rights in Argentina
- Travesti
