= Alba Rueda =

Argentine trans activist

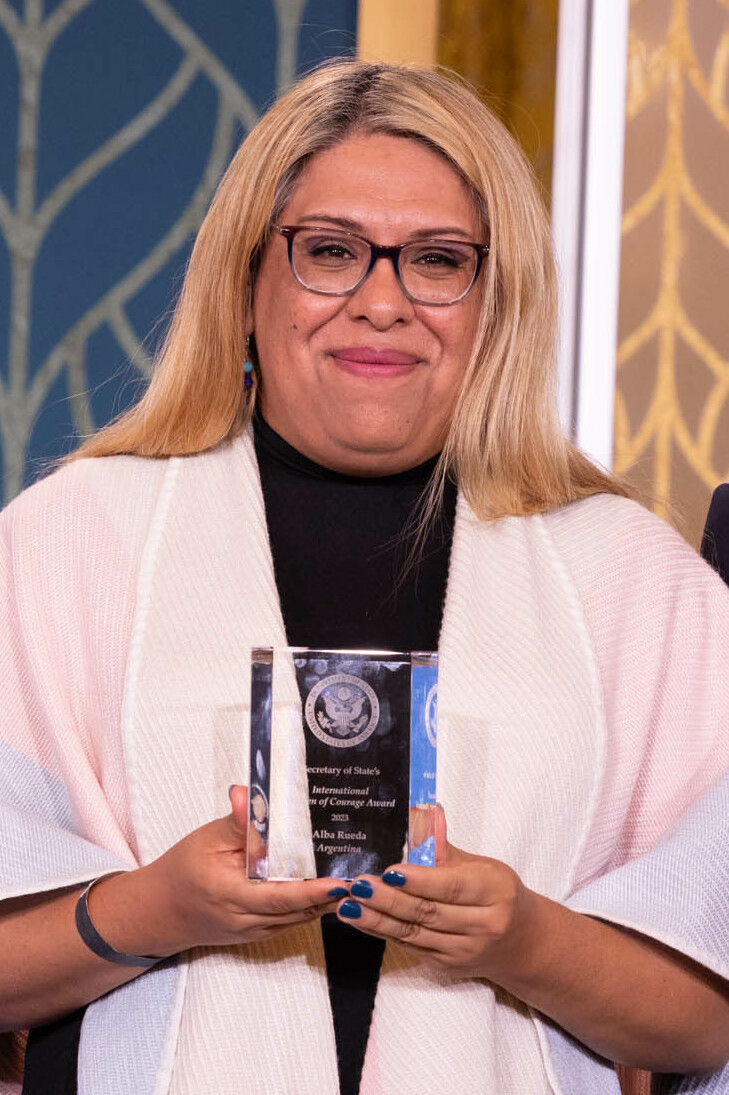
- Rueda in 2023

Undersecretary of Diversity Policies
- In office January 2020 – May 2022
- President: Alberto Fernández
- Preceded by: Post established
- Succeeded by: Greta Pena

Personal details
- Born: 7 April 1976 (age 50) Salta, Argentina
- Other political affiliations: Frente de Todos (2019–2023)
- Education: University of Buenos Aires

Alba Rueda (born 7 April 1976) is an Argentine politician who became the first openly transgender politician in Argentina to hold a senior governmental position when she served as the Undersecretary of Diversity Policies within the Ministry of Women, Genders and Diversity between January 2020 and May 2022.

== Early life ==
Rueda was born in Salta on 7 April 1976 and moved to Buenos Aires with her family in the 1990s, where they experienced poverty. She came out at the age of 16 when she renamed herself Alba. She went on to study philosophy at the University of Buenos Aires, though dropped out shortly before completing her degree, citing transphobia amongst university staff.

== Activism ==
In 2003, Rueda began visiting Hotel Gondolín, a centre for transgender people in Buenos Aires that became a hub for the Argentine transgender rights movement. There, she met noted local transgender activists, including Marlene Wayar and Lohana Berkins. Rueda has advocated for the inclusion of trans women in feminist spaces and promoted transfeminist causes. Rueda has campaigned for same-sex marriage in Argentina, which was legalised by the Argentine government in 2010; and also successfully campaigned for the passing of the Gender Identity Law in 2012. Following its passing, Rueda established 0800, a telephone helpline to support trans Argentinians to have their personal documents registered to their corresponding name and gender.

In 2006, Rueda began working for the National Institute Against Discrimination, Xenophobia and Racism (Spanish: Instituto Nacional contra la Discriminación, la Xenofobia y el Racismo, INADI). Rueda did not get paid for two years due to her gender identity not matching her official paperwork; she began publicly advocating for the formal recognition on her salary receipt of her gender identity, which was approved by then-President Cristina Fernández de Kirchner in 2008. Rueda's national identity document (Documento Nacional de Identidad, DNI) was ultimately changed in 2019. She subsequent went on to sue the Archbishop of Salta due to his refusal to update her baptism certificate with her chosen name.

In addition to her work with INADI, Rueda was also a journalist for Notitrans, the first trans news magazine in Latin America. Rueda is the founder of Trans Women Argentina (Spanish: Mujeres Trans Argentina) and served as its president. She served as a researcher in the Department of Gender and Communications within the Floreal Gorini Cooperation Centre. Rueda also is a member of the Observatory of Gender in Justice within the Judiciary of the City of Buenos Aires.

== Political career ==
On 24 December 2019 it was announced that Rueda would become Undersecretary for Diversity Policies within the newly established Ministry of Women, Genders and Diversity. Rueda took up the position in January 2020. She has campaigned for an employment quota bill that reserves 1% of public sector jobs for transgender people; this bill was passed into law in June 2021 by the National Congress. Rueda had previously criticised the Argentine government for suggesting that heterosexuality was part of "sexual diversity". In 2022, Rueda was appointed Special Representative on Sexual Orientation and Gender Identity to the Ministry of Foreign Affairs and Worship, Santiago Cafiero. Rueda became one of only five envoys internationally advocating for LGBTQIA rights on behalf of national governments, alongside Jessica Stern of the United States; Nick Herbert of the United Kingdom; Fabrizio Petri of Italy; and Sven Lehmann of Germany.

In June 2022, Rueda called on the government to address the issue of transfemicide within Argentina.

== Publications ==
In 2026, Rueda co-authored a novel, Las lágrimas saben por qué, alongside Uruguayan diplomat and writer Fabrizio Petri. The novel was published by Editorial Planeta and tells the story of the friendship between a young gay man raised in a conservative military family and a travesti from Salta.

== Recognition ==
In 2021, Rueda was included as one of the BBC's 100 Women, recognising the most influential women in the world.

In 2022, Rueda was included in Time magazine's Time 100 Next list.

In 2023, she was awarded the International Women of Courage Award by the United States Department of State.
