= Karina Urbina =

Argentine transgender activist

- Born: General Rodríguez Partido, Buenos Aires Province, Argentina
- Occupation: Transgender rights activist

Karina Dora Urbina is an Argentine transgender rights activist. Urbina, who was one of the first activists to speak out publicly in Argentina in support of transgender rights, is also considered the first openly transgender activist in Argentine history, and was a central figure of the trans rights movement during the 1990s. She was a leader of the organisation TRANSDEVI (Spanish: Transexuales por el Derecho a la Identitad y la Vida, lit. 'Transsexuals for the Right to Identity and Life'), alongside Yanina Moreno and Patricia Gauna, and she co-organised and participated in the first pride march to take place in Buenos Aires.

== Activism ==
Urbina first presented herself to a court requesting the legal recognition of her female identity on 25 March 1982. In June 1989, the Civil Court of the Federal Capital formally ruled against her request. In December 1989, Urbina filed a complaint against that ruling before the Supreme Court. That same year, she presented a bill to Alberto Pierri, a member of the Justicialist Party and then-President of the Chamber of Deputies, that would see the laws regarding changing gender identity established; though she never received a response.

On 7 May 1991, Urbina first publicly protested in front of the National Congress of Argentina, calling for the legal recognition of her gender and a repeal of article 91 of the Penal Code, which criminalised gender-affirming surgery. Her protest is widely understood to be the first public protest in support of transgender rights to happen within Argentina, and led to the establishment of TRANSDEVI, which would carry out regular protests in front of Congress. Also in 1991, Urbina drafted a bill that would allow body modifications and gender change recognition, and presented it to Eduardo Duhalde, the then-President of the Chamber of Deputies, with the support of 62 officials; however, the bill was unsuccessful due to a lack of deputies willing to progress it further.

While Urbina was not the first transgender Argentine to file a case in court concerning having their gender legally recognised, she was the first to have her case heard before the Supreme Court, in 1992. The Court ultimately did not make a ruling due to declaring that the case had expired; however, arguments were still held between the justices, which was seen as a significant step in relation to the campaign for the legal recognition of the gender of trans Argentines.

TRANSDEVI's regular protests in front of the National Congress were supported by other organisations across the political and social spectrum, including the Argentine Homosexual Community; Gays for Civil Rights; the Grandmothers of the Plaza de Mayo; the Service, Peace and Justice Foundation, chaired by Adolfo Pérez Esquivel; and the Delegation of Israeli Associations of Argentina, among others. The alliance between different social organisations has been seen as setting a standard of strategic alliances between transgender activists and other social and human rights groups in Argentina today.

In 1992, TRANSDEVI took part in Buenos Aires' first pride march, with Urbina taking an organising role alongside other LGBT activists. That same year, she also became the first activist to be interviewed on Argentine television about transgender rights, alongside LGBT activist Carlos Jáuregui, by social commenter Mariano Grondona.

On 23 May 1993, Urbina resigned from the leadership of GaysDC, citing political differences, and she and TRANSDEVI did not attend Buenos Aires' second pride march, held later that year. Urbina became less active in the transgender rights movements in the subsequent years, although she continues to participate in interviews and workshops around transgender issues. Since 1994, TRANSDEVI has published a monthly bulletin, La Voz Transexual ('The Transsexual Voice'), which covers transgender issues including abortion, anticlericalism, antifascism, HIV/AIDS and feminism.

== Recognition ==
On 28 June 2016, Urbina received a diploma from the Buenos Aires City Legislature in recognition of her role as one of the organisers of the city's first pride parade in 1992.

== See also ==
- Carlos Jáuregui: Argentine LGBT rights activist
- Lohana Berkins: Argentine travesti activist
- Diana Sacayán: Argentina transgender activist
