= Alejandra Gils Carbó =

Argentine jurist

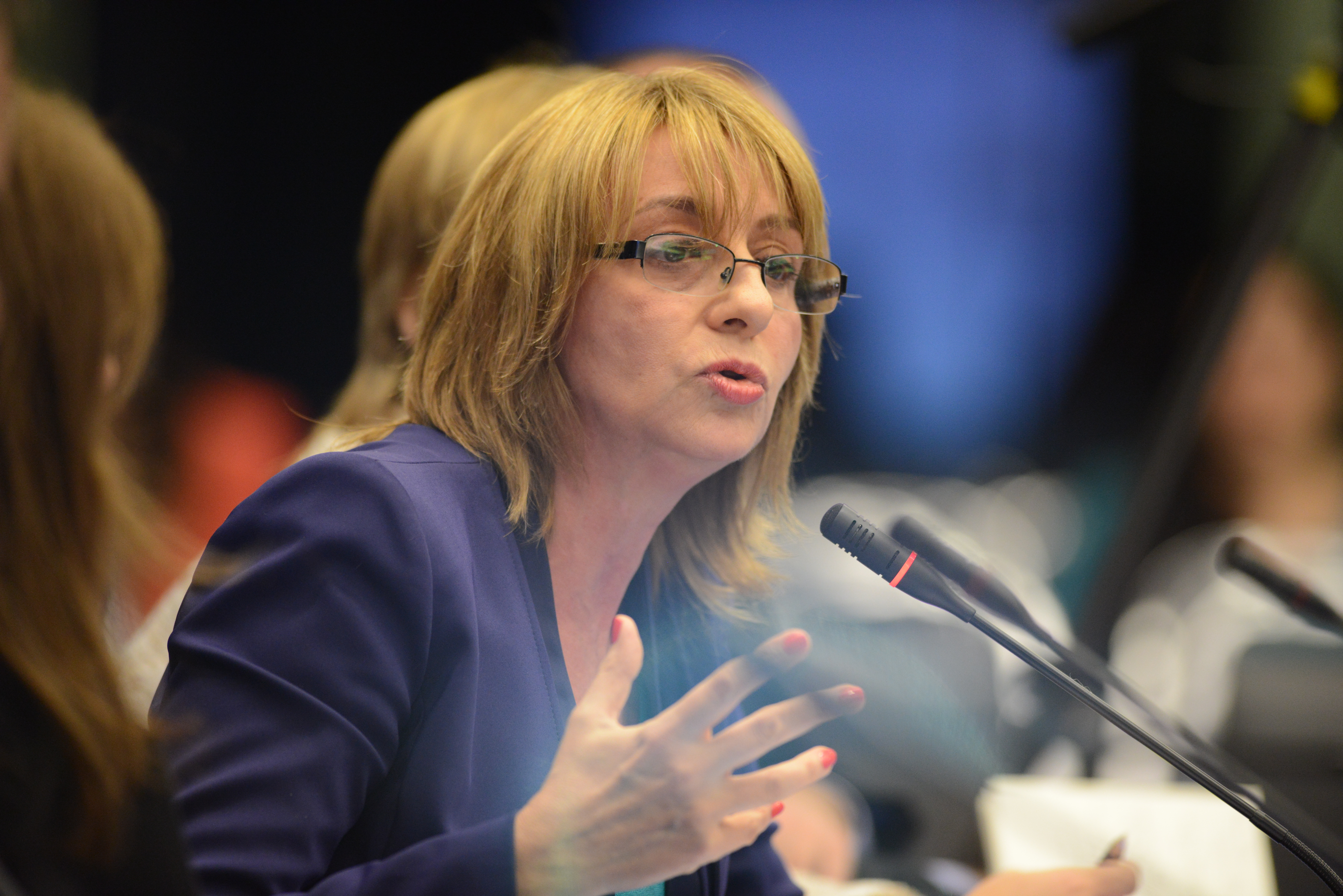

Attorney General of Argentina
- In office 29 August 2012 – 31 December 2017
- President: Cristina Fernández de Kirchner (2012–2015); Mauricio Macri (2015–2017)
- Preceded by: Esteban Righi
- Succeeded by: Eduardo Casal

Personal details
- Born: Alejandra Magdalena Gils Carbó; 20 June 1958 (age 67) Buenos Aires, Argentina
- Party: Radical Civic Union
- Education: University of Buenos Aires; Latin American Faculty of Social Sciences
- Occupation: Jurist

Alejandra Magdalena Gils Carbó (born 20 June 1958) is an Argentine jurist who served as the country's Attorney General from 29 August 2012 to 31 December 2017, during the administrations of Cristina Fernández de Kirchner and Mauricio Macri.

== Early life ==
Alejandra Gils Carbó was born in Buenos Aires on 20 June 1958. She received her law degree from the University of Buenos Aires in 1981, and obtained a master's degree in political economy from the Latin American Faculty of Social Sciences (FLACSO). She is divorced and has 3 children.

She is the author of the book Régimen legal de las bases de datos y Habeas Data (Legal Regime of Databases and Habeas Data), published in 2001, and contributed to Manual para fortalecimiento de Consejos Directivos de Organizaciones sin fines de lucro (Manual for Strengthening Boards of Directors of Nonprofit Organizations) and Los Derechos Humanos en la Jurisprudencia de la Corte (Human Rights in the Jurisprudence of the Court).

In 1982, she began to practice law at Estudio Fargosi, where she worked for five years.

== Career ==
In 1987, she entered public service, as secretary of a commercial court of first instance, presided over by Atilio González. That same year she began to teach at the Universidad del Salvador, as an adjunct professor of Helios Guerrero in the commercial law chair. She was also a professor at the University of Belgrano in the chair "Papers of Commerce and Collective Executions" between 1991 and 1999, among other academic positions.

She was promoted to the position of attorney general of Sala E of the Commercial Appeals Chamber, and in 1994 she entered the Public Prosecutor's Office.

She began as secretary of the prosecution before the same chamber. Four years later, she acceded by competition to the position of deputy attorney general of the Ministry of Public Prosecutions. The Attorney General Nicolás Eduardo Becerra appointed her deputy prosecutor before the Commercial Appeals Chamber. In 2004, she was appointed the body's attorney general. She also served as coordinator of the Commission for the Right to Biological Identity.

In 2007, Gils Carbó opposed the approval of the Extrajudicial Preventive Agreement of the company Cablevisión with its creditors. This agreement was later used to justify the merger of Cablevisión and Multicanal, carried out in December 2007 with a decree signed by President Néstor Kirchner.

=== Attorney General of Argentina ===
She was nominated by the Executive Branch in June 2012 to serve as Attorney General of the Nation (Spanish: Procuradora General de la Nación) after the resignation of Esteban Righi from that position. The statement sent to parliament was approved that August, obtaining 63 votes in favor and only 3 against in the Argentine Senate. President Cristina Fernández de Kirchner swore in Gils Carbó on 29 August 2012.

In January 2015, prosecutor Guillermo Marijuán charged Gils Carbó with the crimes of non-compliance with the duties of a public official and abuse of authority. This was the result of a case in which Judge Claudio Bonadio complained that she did not comply with the protocol of procedures before the request for removal of prosecutor Carlos Gonella, head of the Office of the Prosecutor for Economic Crime and Money Laundering. Gonella was accused of the public dissemination of a case for money laundering against relatives and friends of Valentín Temes Coto, a Spanish businessman. The latter had been sentenced to 20 years in prison for the "White Apples" case, the largest drug trafficking prosecution in Argentina. The Attorney General received the support of more than 80 prosecutors and judicial officials. Some 120 prosecutors from the Public Ministry expressed their support for Gils Carbó, noting their "deep concern" about the demonstrations carried out by various political actors "in the middle of the electoral campaign", and that they exerted "undue pressure" on the official with the demand for her resignation.

In 2017, the national government began a campaign to remove Gils Carbó from her post, and a pro-government deputy suggested that it could be carried out by Mauricio Macri through a decree. The President himself remarked that she did not have "the moral authority to exercise the position".

On 30 October 2017, she submitted her resignation to the Attorney General's Office, due to the fact that she had been prosecuted for fraudulent administration in the purchase of a property at the beginning of that month. Her resignation was effective on 31 December 2017.
