= Lara María Bertolini =

Argentine researcher

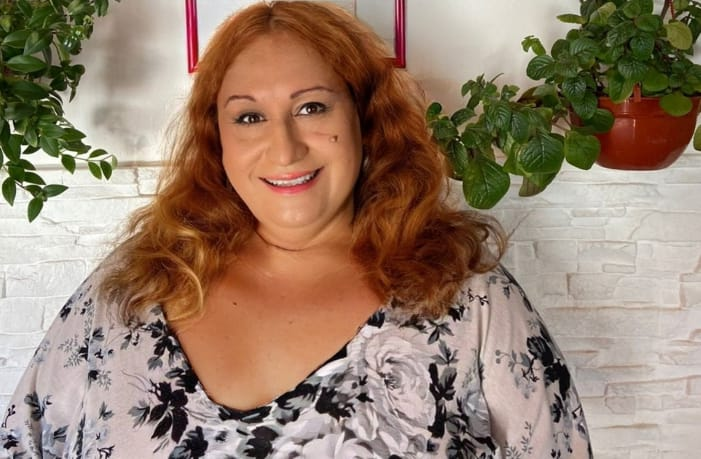
- Lara María Bertolini
- Born: April 10, 1970 (age 56); Buenos Aires, Argentina
- Education: Universidad Nacional de Avellaneda
- Occupations: Activist for Trans rights and researcher
- Employer: Ministerio Público (Argentina)
- Movement: Feminism

Lara María Bertolini (Buenos Aires, 10 April 1970) is an activist, researcher, and author of the book Soberanía Travesti, una Identidad argentina transl. Travesti Sovereignty, an Argentine Identity. She holds a position with the Public Ministry of Argentina and is a law student at the National University of Avellaneda. She won a historical case in Argentina that changed her birth certificate and I.D. to signify her identity with "travesti femininity".

== Biography ==
Lara María Bertolini was born in Buenos Aires, Argentina on 10 April 1970. She is an human rights activist advocating for the rights of travesti, transgender people, and non-binary people. She roots her political actions in efforts to create, defend, and amplify the rights of the LGBT community, especially transgender rights.

She has been outspoken about the importance of hiring trans women, particularly in banks. She notes: "Trans men can experience violence, but they don't experience the structural violence that trans women do across Latin America... We're not even in the margins of poverty and the most vulnerable social categories - we're outside those margins."

She is a founder of critical theory on nonbinary rights. She has worked with the organizations la Colectiva Lohana Berkins (transl. the Lohana Berkins Collective) and Organización Las Bases (transl. The Foundation Organization). She has also worked towards the resolution of trans rights legalities with Abosex (Abogados por los Derechos Sexuales transl. Lawyers for Sexual Rights).

She is also a co-founder Violeta Alegre Ríos of the Movimiento Feminista Antifascista tttinbaxlbmpq∞ (transl. Feminist Antifascist Movement tttinbaxlbmpq∞).

In the framework of the Law Nº 26.743 on Gender Identity, with a historic ruling, her gender was recognized as being outside of the gender binary. The twelve-page ruling by the national civil judge Myriam Cataldi dictates that in the birth certificate and the I.D. of Bertolini must have her gender identity respected: "Femineidad travesti" (transl. Travesti Feminity).

Regarding the process of defining herself as such, Lara affirms:

"When I arrived at the Lohana Berkins Collective in 2016, my identity adapted that which the gender identity law granted me within the established framework (Feminine-Masculine). I was a trans woman, which is also a legitimate and respectable identity. I didn't have any training on gender issues, identities, or anything like that. From that space and listening to references like Susy Shock or Marlene Wayar or like you, I began to question myself and think about myself in other terms. Then, I felt the identity of woman was not consistent with the political force that made my identity. Disassociating myself from the identity of "trans woman" was a political process where I understood the collective and personal particularities, and more than understanding, I identified myself by my life history."

December 2019, the National Court of Civil Appeals overturned that ruling. In response, Alejandra Gils Carbó (the former Attorney General of Argentina) and the lawyer Emilio Buggiani presented an extraordinary appeal for the Supreme Court of Argentina to resolve the request that the I.D. and birth certificate use "travesti femininity." In an interview, the legal team stated:

We are fighting for identity sovereignty and we intend to make visible, recognize the vulnerability, end the silencing and exclusion that has produced a genocide of identities for more than 100 years, and that must be settled once and for all.

After an extended struggle with the judicial system, her ID was rectified. This set the precedence where the Civil Registry was ordered to carry out similar cases administratively and not judicially.

Bertolini writes about trans politics, existence and memory on sites like Revista Anfibia and Página 12. She also participates in conferences and debates, including the talk Jacque al patriarcado (transl. Check the Patriarchy) organized by The Ministry of Social Development in Argentina. This talk was aimed at union, social, sports, neighborhood organizations, health professionals, and teachers, and more.

She was a columnist writing about transgender topics on Futurock on the program "a los Botes" and has been interviewed many times.

== Writing career ==
Bertolini wrote the book Soberanía Travesti, una identidad argentina (June 2021, Editorial Acercándonos Cultura). This book presents as essay about Latin American travesti critical theory and questions the natural and social sciences (especially the legal system) that base themselves on identity binaries. It also presents a definition of travesti sovereignty:

"It is the accumulation of claims that occur with identity non-recognition. The travesti identity, even within the same group, is the most rejected...The travesti identity has emerged from the deepest depths of the mud of a person's indignity and denial by the state, demonstrating that, if there is something more violated than travesti sovereignty, it is the travesti sovereignty of fellow migrants."
