= Nadia Echazú =

Argentine human rights activist (died 2004)

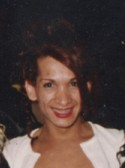
- Echazú in 1998
- Born: Salta, Salta Province, Argentina
- Died: 18 July 2004
- Cause of death: HIV
- Monuments: Nadia Echazú Textile Cooperative
- Occupations: Sex worker Human rights activist
- Years active: 1990s–2004
- Organization(s): Organization of Travestis and Transsexuals of Argentina

Nadia Echazú (died 18 July 2004) was an Argentine human rights activist and a founder of the Organization of Transvestis and Transsexuals of Argentina (OTTRA). The Nadia Echazú Textile Cooperative is named in her honour; it trains transgender people with the aim of facilitating their integration into the economy. Echazú is cited in the Stanford Encyclopaedia of Philosophy as a key thinker in the development of Trans philosophy in Argentina.

== Early life ==
Born in Salta, Salta Province, Echazú moved to Córdoba in the 1980s where she worked as a sex worker in the Second Police Precinct. Between 1993 and 1994 she moved to Buenos Aires. Echazú was a trans woman.

== Activism ==
In the 1990s, along with activists Lohana Berkins, Diana Sacayán and Marlene Wayar, Echazú fought against the creation of ghettos for the travesti and transgender communities in the cities of Córdoba and Buenos Aires. In Córdoba, she co-founded the Association Against Homosexual Discrimination (ACoDHo) with bar owner Eugenio Cesano. In Buenos Aires, she was an activist with the Association of Travestis of Argentina (ATA, later the Asociación de Travestis, Transexuales y Transgéneros de Argentina) and later a founder of the Organization of Travestis and Transsexuals of Argentina (OTTRA). She was a strong proponent of the legal rights of travesti people.

From 1995 to 1998, Argentine police had the authority to detain people in public whom they perceived to be transgender. In 2001, Echazú was arrested whilst handing out condoms and HIV advice. She had tear gas sprayed in her face and was tortured during her subsequent detention. The arrest was reported by Amnesty International. Despite living in Buenos Aires, Echazú regularly visited friends in Córdoba. One visit in 2000 coincided with the death in police custody of Vanesa Ledesma, who precipitated the first transgender marches in Córdoba, which Echazú helped organise.

Echazú died on 18 July 2004 of HIV at Muñiz Hospital.

== Legacy ==
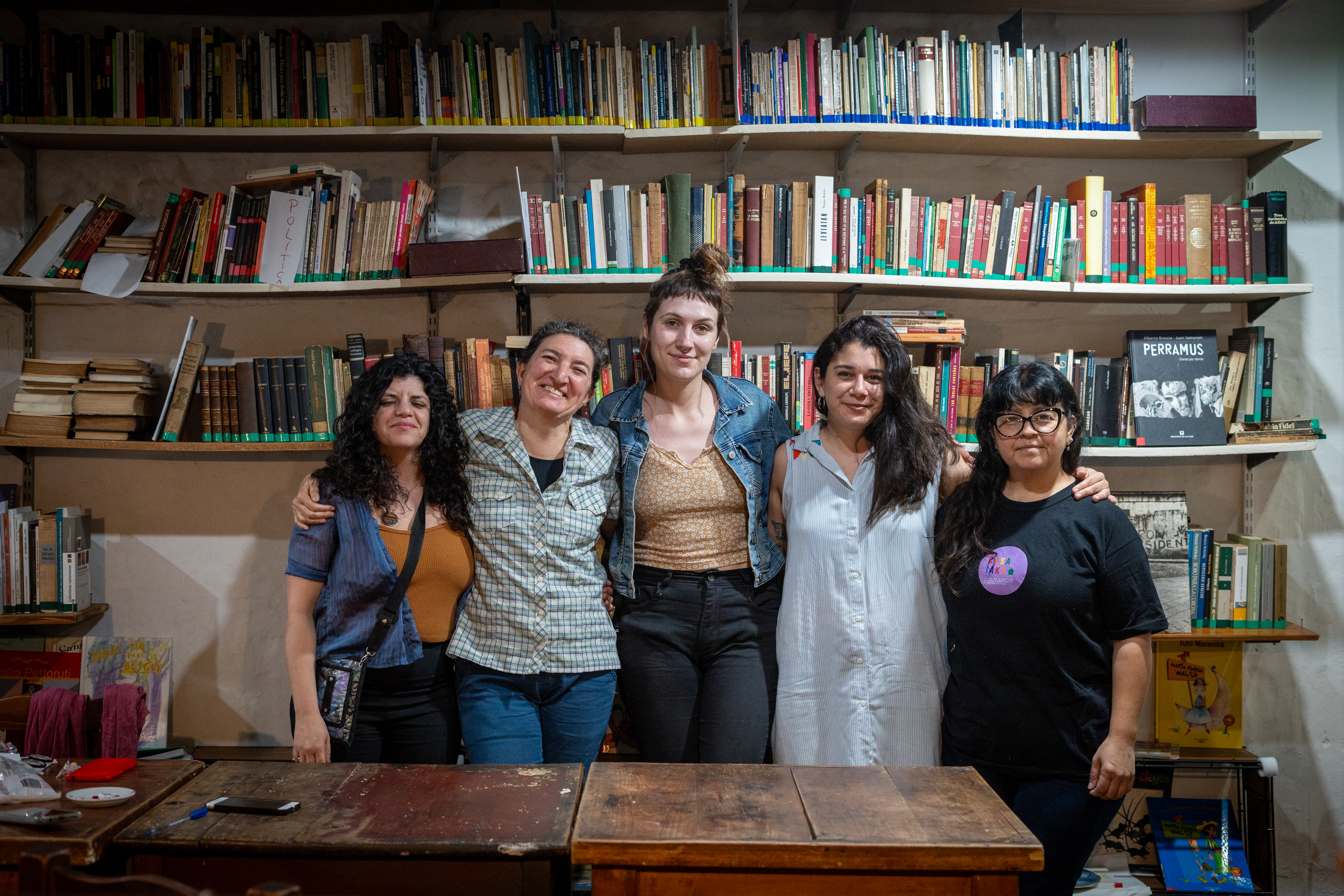
Five workers from the Nadia Echazú Textile Cooperative, 2024

In 2008, the activist collective she was active in launched a workers' cooperative bearing her name: the Nadia Echazú Textile Cooperative. It was co-founded by Marlene Wayar. This enterprise has been recognized by national and international institutions and organizations and promotes social integration, an idea outlined by Echazú to lift trans women out of the marginalization and prostitution to which they were relegated. It is located in the Crucecita neighborhood of Avellaneda, provided by the National Institute of Associativism and Social Economy. At this centre, training and experience are offered to transgender people with the aim of facilitating their integration into the economy.

Echazú is cited in the Stanford Encyclopaedia of Philosophy as a key thinker in the development of Argentine transgender philosophy.
