= Diana Maffía =

Argentine academic and politician

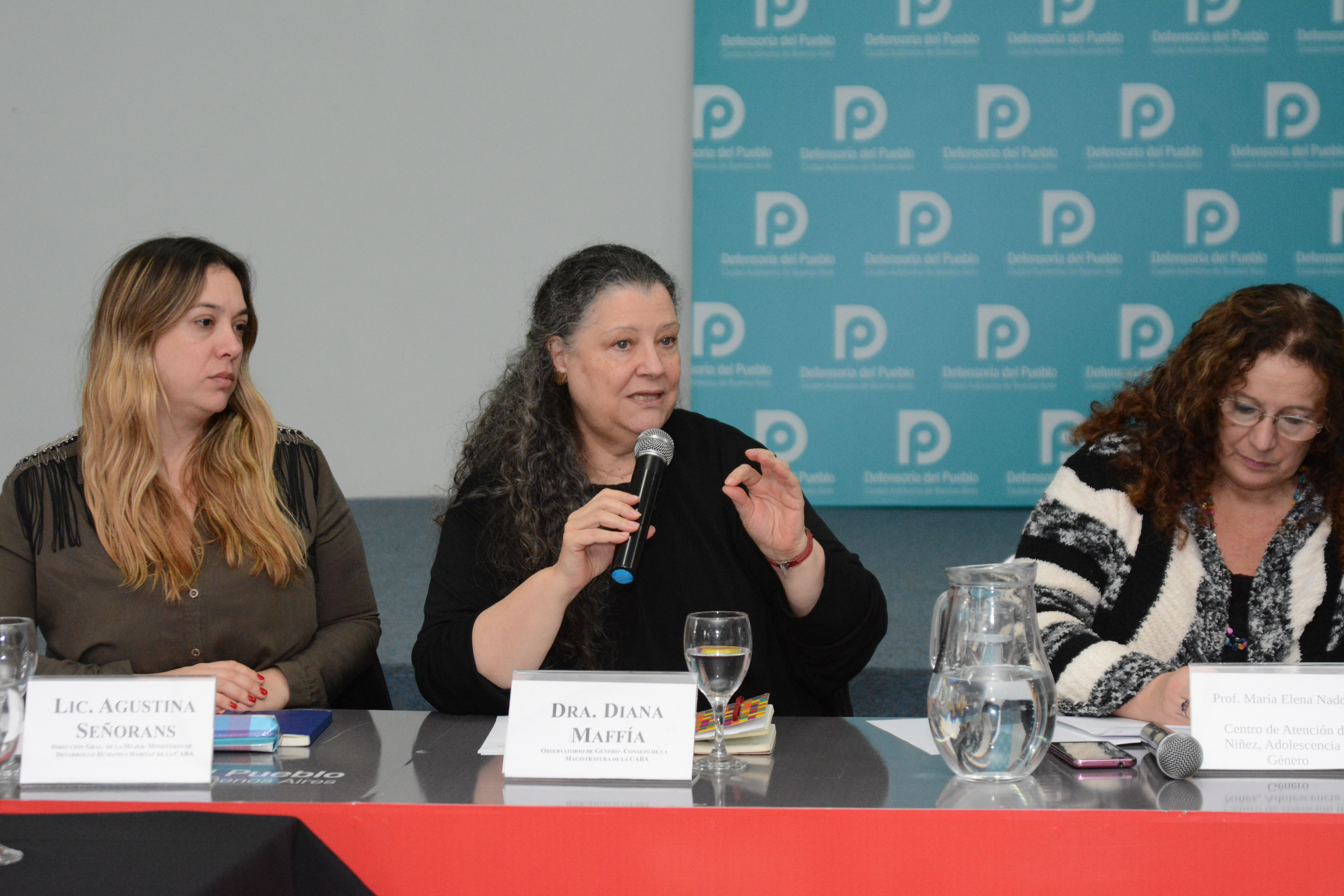

Legislator of the City of Buenos Aires
- In office 10 December 2007 – 10 December 2011

Personal details
- Born: Diana Helena Maffía; 19 September 1953 (age 73) Buenos Aires, Argentina
- Party: Civic Coalition ARI
- Spouse: Alberto Moretti
- Education: University of Buenos Aires
- Occupation: Academic, politician
- Awards: Konex Award (2016)
- Website: dianamaffia.com.ar

Diana Helena Maffía (born 19 September 1953) is an Argentine academic and politician.

With a PhD in philosophy from the University of Buenos Aires (UBA), Maffía is a professor of undergraduate and postgraduate programs at UBA and other national and international universities. She is a researcher at UBA's Interdisciplinary Institute of Gender Studies (IIEGE), founded the Argentine Network of Gender, Science, and Technology in 1994, and was a member of the Argentine Association of Women in Philosophy from 1987 to 1991. She has directed research projects and doctoral and master's theses. She is the author of numerous books and articles. She served as deputy ombudsman (1998–2003) and city deputy of Buenos Aires (2007–2011), receiving Parlamentario Awards for each year of her legislative work. Since 2012, she has directed the Observatory on Gender in Justice, which reports to the Buenos Aires Council of Magistracy. Other awards and mentions include the Dignity Award from the Permanent Assembly for Human Rights in 2001, and the Konex Award Diploma of Merit in 2016.

== Biography ==
Diana Maffía was born in Buenos Aires on 19 September 1953, the second of four siblings. She went to a Mercedarian elementary school, moved to the Nicolás Avellaneda school in third grade, and attended Escuela Normal 1 for her secondary education.

In 1971, she majored in philosophy at UBA. After graduating, she joined the Argentine Society of Philosophical Analysis (SADAF). In the 1980s, she received a teaching degree in philosophy at UBA.

In the early 1980s, she married Alberto Moretti, with whom she has two children.

In 2000, she obtained a doctorate in philosophy from the same university. Her thesis was titled Género, subjetividad y conocimiento (Gender, Subjectivity, and Knowledge).

On several occasions, she has publicly stated that she is agnostic.

== Public offices ==
Diana Maffia at the Argentine Gender, Science, and Technology Network (RAGCYT)

From 1998 to 2003, Maffía served as deputy ombudsman of the City of Buenos Aires, in the area of human rights and gender equality. She advocated for the rights of women, children and adolescents, sexual minorities, and sex workers.

From 2004 to 2008, she was academic director of the Hannah Arendt Institute of Cultural and Political Formation, and taught the classes "Scientific, Practical, Mystical, Aesthetic Knowledge" and "Social Contract Modes".

From 2007 to 2011, she was a member of the Buenos Aires City Legislature for the Civic Coalition ARI party. She chaired the Committee on Women, Children, Adolescents and Youth, and was also part of the committees on culture, health, and monitoring of control organizations. During her tenure, she introduced a bill to improve the conditions of sex workers, spearheaded the creation of the Raquel Liberman Award for the prevention of gender violence, supported the legalization of abortion in Argentina, and co-authored a bill on dignified death. She was critical of the actions of the chief of government of Buenos Aires, Mauricio Macri, and that of the national government led by President Cristina Fernández de Kirchner.

On 26 May 2012, she participated in the WikiGénero "making gender gaps visible on Wikipedia" meeting held at the Ricardo Rojas Cultural Center in Buenos Aires.

From 2012 to 2014, she was a member of the academic council of the Judicial Training Center of the Buenos Aires City Council of Magistracy, and since 2012 she has been the director of its Observatory of Gender in Justice.

Other academic positions include professor of gnosiology at the UBA Faculty of Philosophy and Letters, professor of feminist epistemology (in the master of gender studies program) at the National University of Rosario's Faculty of Humanities and Arts, researcher at the UBA Interdisciplinary Institute for Gender Studies, and director of the study "Control, Defense, and Promotion of Sexual and Reproductive Rights", funded by the Ford Foundation.

== Awards and recognitions ==
- 2000: Dignity Award from the Permanent Assembly for Human Rights
- 2008: Parlamentario Award
- 2009: Parlamentario Award
- 2010: Bicentennial Medal from the government of Buenos Aires
- 2010: Parlamentario Award
- 2011: Parlamentario Award
- 2011: Medal of recognition from the Buenos Aires City Legislature
- 2011: SP Award for Best Non-Official Legislator
- 2016: Konex Award Diploma of Merit for Gender Studies
- Doctora Honoris Causa, National University of Córdoba, Argentina (2019)
- Doctor Honoris Causa, National University of the Littoral, Argentina (2024)

== Publications ==
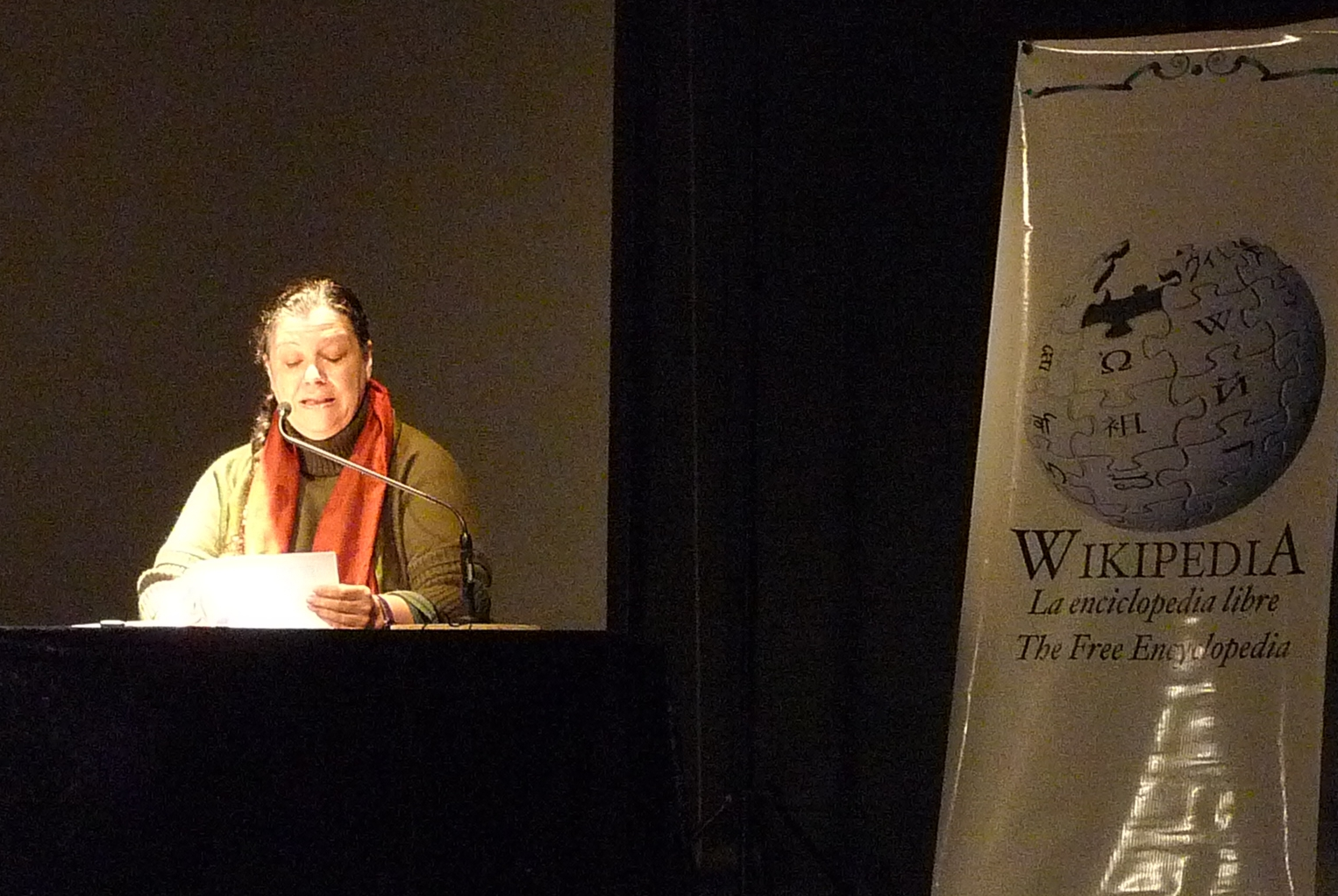
Diana Maffía giving her presentation at the WikiGénero conference in Buenos Aires on 26 May 2012

- Búsquedas de sentido para una nueva política (2005), in collaboration with Elisa Carrió. Buenos Aires: Paidós, ISBN 9789501265477.
- Lohana Berkins and Claudia Korol (compilers): Diálogo: prostitución/ trabajo sexual: las protagonistas hablan (2007). Buenos Aires: Argentina Feminaria Editora, ISBN 9789872199968.
- La concepción del poder desde las mujeres. Foro de líderes mujeres políticas de Latinoamérica: Buenos Aires, 4 y 5 de noviembre de 2004 (2005). Buenos Aires: Hannah Arendt Institute and International Institute for Democracy and Electoral Assistance (International IDEA). Participants included Dora Barrancos, Patricia Bullrich, Elisa Carrió, María Eugenia Estenssoro, and Diana Maffía.
- Diana Maffía: Sexualidades migrantes género y transgénero (2003). Feminaria Editora, ISBN 9789872055578.
- Jorge Horacio Raíces Montero (compiler), Lohana Berkins, Liliana Hendel, Curtis E. Hinkle, Emiliano Litardo, Diana Maffía, Alejandro Modarelli, Pedro Paradiso Sottile, Iñaki Regueiro de Giacomi: Un cuerpo: mil sexos (intersexualidades). Buenos Aires: Topía, 2009, ISBN 9789871185337.
- Diana Maffía (2006). "¿Qué dice la ley argentina?" in Checa, S. (compiler), Realidades y coyunturas del aborto. Entre el derecho y la necesidad. Buenos Aires: Paidós, ISBN 9789501245370.
- Diana Maffía (2008). "Contra las dicotomías: Feminismo y epistemología crítica" in Seminario de epistemología feminista, Faculty of Philosophy and Letters, University of Buenos Aires.
