= Nicolás Eduardo Becerra =

Argentine politician (1943–2023)

Attorney General of Argentina
- In office 23 April 1997 – 5 February 2004
- President: Carlos Menem; Fernando de la Rúa; Ramón Puerta (acting); Adolfo Rodríguez Saá (interim); Eduardo Duhalde (interim); Nestor Kirchner
- Preceded by: Ángel Nicolás Agüero Iturbe
- Succeeded by: Esteban Righi

National Deputy
- In office 24 April 1991 – 9 December 1995
- Constituency: Mendoza

Personal details
- Born: 25 January 1943
- Died: 9 April 2023 (aged 80)
- Party: Justicialist Party

Nicolás Eduardo Becerra (25 January 1943 – 9 April 2023) was an Argentine lawyer and politician. He served as Attorney General of Argentina from 1997 to 2004. He also served as National Deputy from Mendoza Province from 1991 to 1995.

== Political career ==
Becerra served as a national deputy for the Justicialista Party for the province of Mendoza between 24 April 1991 and 9 December 1995, as general defender of the Nation, secretary of the Cabinet headquarters—when the incumbent was Eduardo Bauzá—and was Attorney General of the Nation between 23 April 1997 and 5 February 2004. In this last position, he issued important opinions, such as when he ruled for the invalidity of the Laws of Due Obedience and Full Stop, for the imprescriptibility of crimes such as the theft of babies from the disappeared and in favor of savers affected by the "corralito".

Becerra was appointed regular arbitrator in the Mercosur Arbitration Court for the 2000 to 2004 and 2004 to 2008 periods.

In June 2001, Juan Gasparini and Rodrigo de Castro stated that Becerra had an undeclared bank account at the Credit Suisse bank in Zürich which led to an investigation that ended when federal judge Juan José Galeano rejected the request to investigate that account by requesting the lifting of bank secrecy from Switzerland, as requested by federal prosecutors; Gasparini and De Castro also linked Becerra to different criminal acts. The former prosecutor filed a lawsuit against Gasparini that was later dropped.
