= Diana Sacayán–Lohana Berkins Law =

2021 transgender-related law in Argentina

National Congress of Argentina
- Long title: Law to Promote Access to Formal Employment for Travestis, and Transsexual and Transgender People "Diana Sacayán–Lohana Berkins" (Spanish: Ley de Promoción del Acceso al Empleo Formal para Personas Travestis, Transexuales y Transgénero "Diana Sacayán – Lohana Berkins")
- Citation: Law 27,636
- Territorial extent: Argentina
- Enacted by: Chamber of Deputies
- Enacted by: Senate
- Effective: 16 July 2021 (Note: In Argentina, unless otherwise stated, laws come into effect eight days after their publication in the government gazette.)

Legislative history

Initiating chamber: Chamber of Deputies
- Passed: 11 June 2021
- Voting summary: 207 voted for; 11 voted against; 7 abstained

Revising chamber: Senate
- Passed: 24 June 2021
- Voting summary: 55 voted for; 1 voted against; 6 abstained

Summary
- National public sector must reserve at least 1% of its positions and vacancies for trans people
- Status: In force

The Law to Promote Access to Formal Employment for Travestis, and Transsexual and Transgender People "Diana Sacayán–Lohana Berkins", (Note: Spanish: Ley de Promoción del Acceso al Empleo Formal para Personas Travestis, Transexuales y Transgénero "Diana Sacayán – Lohana Berkins".) identified as the Law 27,636, (Note: Spanish: Ley 27,636.) is a law in Argentina that establishes that the national public sector must reserve at least 1% of its positions and vacancies for trans people, and encourages the private sector to take similar measures. It was passed by the Argentine Senate on 24 June 2021, and enacted on 8 July 2021, during the government of Alberto Fernández. The law is named after trans activists Diana Sacayán and Lohana Berkins.

The Diana Sacayán–Lohana Berkins Law is based on the decree 721/2020, signed by Fernández, which sought to guarantee the labour inclusion of trans people in the national public sector.

== History ==
Named after trans activists Diana Sacayán and Lohana Berkins, the law is the unification of two bills: the "Lohana Berkins" Formal Labour Inclusion Law, (Note: Spanish: Ley de Inclusión Laboral Formal "Lohana Berkins".) produced by the Liga LGBTIQ+ of the provinces and the Convocatoria Federal Travesti Trans Argentina, and the "Diana Sacayán" Labour Quota Law, (Note: Spanish: Ley de Cupo Laboral "Diana Sacayán".) produced by the Frente Orgullo y Lucha.

Berkins, together with Josefina Fernández, carried out a survey on the living conditions of travestis, which was published under the title La gesta del nombre propio. This material was later expanded and published as La revolución de las mariposas in 2017. These data made it possible to understand and make visible the living conditions of trans people, and many of them were contributed during the debates in the Congress. Sacayán, for her part, had promoted the creation of the Travesti–Trans Labour Quota Law (Note: Spanish: Ley de Cupo Laboral Travesti-Trans.) in the province of Buenos Aires.

The law was passed on 11 June 2021 by the Chamber of Deputies with 207 votes in favour, 11 against, and 7 abstentions; and on 24 June 2021 by the Senate with 55 votes in favour, 1 against, and 6 abstentions. It was enacted on 8 July 2021, and came into effect on 16 July 2021.

== See also ==
- Transgender rights in Argentina
  - Gender Identity Law (Argentina)
