= Andrés J. d'Alessio =

Argentine academic, lawyer, and judge

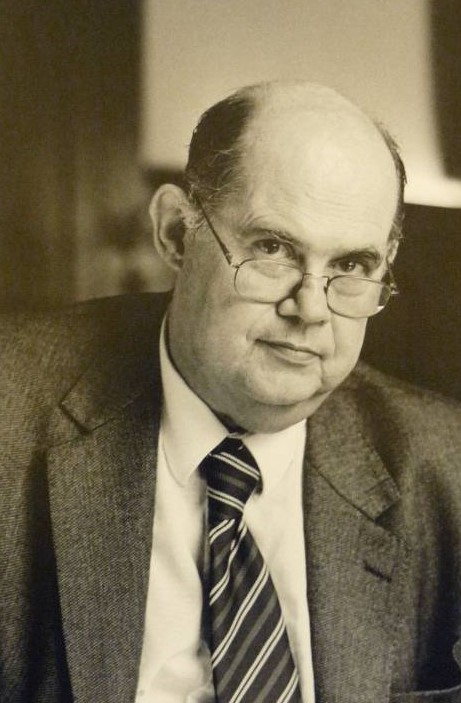

Attorney General of Argentina
- In office 1987–1989
- Preceded by: Juan Octavio Gauna
- Succeeded by: Oscar Eduardo Roger

Personal details
- Born: 17 April 1940 Buenos Aires, Argentina
- Died: 4 April 2009 (aged 68) Buenos Aires, Argentina

Andrés J. d'Alessio (17 April 1940 – 4 April 2009) was an Argentine academic, lawyer, and judge. He was personally involved in the Trial of the Juntas.

== Career ==
As a defense lawyer he served in some cases of public interest, such as the defenses of judges Ricardo Lona, in 2004 and Juan José Galeano, this one for his responsibilities in the trial for the terrorist attack on the AMIA.
