= Guillermo Mac Millan =

Retired Chilean urologist

- Born: 1940 or 1941 (age 84–85)
- Education: University of Chile
- Occupation: Urologist
- Years active: 1976-2019
- Employer: Van Buren Hospital
- Known for: Sex reassignment surgery

Guillermo Mac Millan (born 1940/1941) is a retired Chilean urologist who worked at Van Buren Hospital in Valparaíso. He carried out sex reassignment surgery on hundreds of patients over the course of his career.

== Life ==
Mac Millan studied at the University of Chile, where he participated in heart transplantations led by Jorge Kaplán Meyer. He began practice as a urologist in 1966.

In 1976, when Mac Millan was 36 years old, a woman he had operated on for kidney cancer asked him if he could help her daughter, who was a trans woman. Using a modification of an existing technique, Mac Millan performed sex reassignment surgery on the woman's daughter. By the time a year passed, he had performed ten such surgeries, all of them for free. He initially faced criticism from colleagues, who told him that what he was doing was unnatural or immoral. He went on to become the head of Van Buren Hospital's urology department.

Between 1976 and 2019, Mac Millan carried out sex reassignment surgery on 448 to about 700 patients. He had many patients from Argentina, where genitoplasty was at one time considered a mutilation punishable by imprisonment, including Mariela Muñoz.

=== Retirement ===
Mac Millan retired in 2019 at the age of 78. At the time of his retirement, nobody in the area was qualified to replace him. His intended replacement, Melissa Cifuentes, was still studying the specialization and was expected to begin work in September 2020. Van Buren Hospital suspended genitoplasties until that date. The local chapter of MOVILH praised Mac Millan's work and called on the Chilean Ministry of Health to train more professionals in genitoplasty.
