= List of attorneys general of Argentina =

Attorney General of Argentina
- Procurador General de la Nación Argentina
- Incumbent; Eduardo Casal since 31 December 2017
- Appointer: Presidential nomination with Senate confirmation
- Term length: Life tenure
- Constituting instrument: Constitution of Argentina
- Inaugural holder: Francisco Pico
- Formation: 15 January 1863; 163 years ago15 de enero de 1863
- Website: www.mpf.gob.ar/procuracion-general/

The attorney general of Argentina (Spanish: Procurador General de la Nación Argentina) is the chief of all the prosecutors who act before national courts, as well as the designated prosecutor in the Supreme Court. The attorney general leads the Ministry of Public Prosecutions (Ministerio Público Fiscal; MPF). The Ministry of Public Prosecutions and the Ombudsperson's Office (Defensoría General) make up Argentina's Public Ministry, in accordance to Article 120 of the Argentine constitution.

Since 2017, the attorney general of Argentina has been Eduardo Casal, who serves in interim fashion following the resignation of Alejandra Gils Carbó.

== List of attorneys general ==
- 1863–1875 Francisco Pico
- 1875–1878 Carlos Tejedor
- 1878–1890 Eduardo Costa
- 1890–1892 Antonio Malaver
- 1892–1905 Sabiniano Kier
- 1905–1917 Julio Botet
- 1917–1922 José Nicolás Matienzo
- 1923–1935 Horacio Rodríguez Larreta (attorney general)
- 1935–1947 Juan Álvarez
- 1947–1955 Carlos Gabriel Delfino
- 1955–1958 Sebastián Soler
- 1958–1966 Ramón Lascano
- 1966–1973 Eduardo Marquardt
- 1973–1976 Enrique C. Petracchi
- 1976–1980 Elías P. Guastavino
- 1980–1983 Mario Justo Lopez
- 1983–1987 Juan Octavio Gauna
- 1987–1989 Andrés José d'Alessio
- 1989–1991 Oscar Eduardo Roger
- 1991–1992 Rebón Aldo Montesano
- 1992–1994 Oscar Luján Fappiano
- 1994–1997 Ángel Nicolás Agüero Iturbe
- 1997–2004 Nicolás Eduardo Becerra
- 2004–2012 Esteban Justo Righi
- 2012–2017 Alejandra Magdalena Gils Carbó
- 2017- Eduardo Casal (Interim)
