= Diana Sacayán =

Argentine LGBT rights activist (1975-2015)

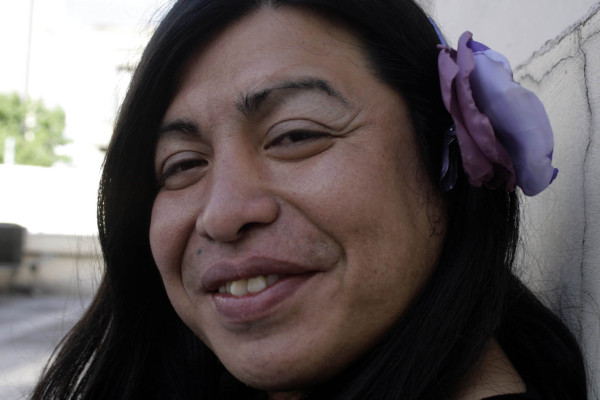
- Diana Sacayán in 2010
- Born: 31 December 1975; Tucumán, Argentina
- Died: 11 October 2015 (aged 39); Buenos Aires, Argentina
- Cause of death: Homicide
- Resting place: Lar de Paz Cemetery, González Catán
- Occupation: Travesti activist
- Years active: 2001 – 2015
- Organization(s): Anti-Discrimination Movement of Liberation (MAL), founder ILGA, leader INADI, member
- Known for: Diana Sacayán – Lohana Berkins Law
- Political party: Communist (before 2011); Independent (2011–2015)

Amancay Diana Sacayán (31 December 1975 – 11 October 2015) was an Argentine LGBT and human rights activist who fought for the legal rights of travesti and transgender people in Argentina.

She founded the Movimiento Antidiscriminatorio de Liberación (MAL; English: Anti-Discrimination Movement of Liberation ) and was part of the National Front for the Gender Identity Act in Argentina during public debate on Law 26,743 on Gender Identity. In June 2012, she became the first trans person to run for ombudsman, running for La Matanza Partido. On 2 July 2012, she became the first Argentine trans person to receive a national identity card affirming her gender. It was handed to her by then-President Cristina Kirchner.

Sacayán was murdered on 11 October 2015. On 18 June 2018, Oral Criminal Court 4 of Buenos Aires convicted one of her murderers, handing down a judgement that recognized, for the first time in the Argentine criminal justice system, the murder of a travesti as a hate crime involving gender identity. Provisions in Article 80, paragraph 4 of the Penal Code of Argentina were applied in reaching the decision. However, that aspect of the grisly murder was nullified in a decision by the National Chamber of Cassation in Criminal and Correctional Matters on 2 October 2020, though the sentence of life imprisonment was upheld.

== Biography ==
Amancay Diana Sacayán was born in Tucumán on 31 December 1975. Her ancestors were Diaguita. At a young age, her family moved to Gregorio de Laferrère, Buenos Aires. She led a life of poverty with her 15 siblings.

Sacayán came out as travesti at the age of seventeen. She received silicone injections in both her breasts and buttocks from a fellow travesti, a procedure she did not recommend to others because of hygiene concerns. Sacayán worked as a prostitute for twelve years before moving fully into activism in 2001.

She studied Popular Education at the Universidad de las Madres.

== Activism ==
=== Candidacy ===
Sacayán ran for the position of school counselor with the Communist Party for the election held on 24 August 2003.

She ran for the position of ombudsman of La Matanza Partido in 2012, becoming the first transgender candidate for such a position. Sacayán was an independent in the election, one of seven candidates. The field was narrowed to three candidates before the 24 councillors voted on 7 November 2012: incumbent Silvia Caprino, Sacayán, and Omar Frade. Sacayán received the second-highest number of votes in the election, with Caprino retaining her office after receiving 17 votes.

=== Organizations ===
Sacayán created the Anti-Discrimination Movement of Liberation (MAL), a non-governmental organization, in 2001. One of the main goals of the group is to emphasize empowering LGBTI persons through meeting basic human rights, from employment training and certification programs to the establishment of a health office for both mental and physical healthcare needs in the LGBT community in both Morón and La Matanza. Sacayán and MAL regularly worked to overcome the idea of prostitution being a viable and genuine career rather than a direct result of a lack of employment opportunities. The tenets of inclusion of travesti, transsexual, and transgender persons eventually led to the creation of the National Gender Identity Law. In addition to her work with MAL, Sacayán also served on the board of the International Lesbian, Gay, Bisexual, Trans and Intersex Association.

The Ministry of Health of Buenos Aires released a statement, reproduced by the media, in which MAL is directly named as contributing to the passage of Resolution 2359, in accordance with law 13.175 (equal access to healthcare), on 5 July 2007 which required that all medical personnel in the province of Buenos Aires address patients by their preferred names. The city of Santa Fe passed similar legislation, Resolution 1877/09, as did the city of Buenos Aires, Law 3.062.

MAL and several other groups advocated for the eligibility of the trans community in Argentina to receive the constitutionally-guaranteed adequate housing in 2009. Despite the right enshrined in Article 14a of the National Constitution, transgender, transsexual and travesti persons were denied inclusion in the Federal Housing Plan under President Cristina Kirchner's administration.

Alongside Berkins' Association for the Struggle for Travesti and Transsexual Identity (ALITT), Sacayán also helped establish the Silvia Rivera cooperative, a group focused on training members of the trans community for careers in the food service and catering industry. They registered with the INAES [es] while trying to establish the restaurant in La Matanza for training. Mayor Fernando Espinoza stymied the development of the cooperative by refusing to meet with its leaders in 2011 regarding a physical location. She also worked alongside Marlene Wayar, the founder of El Teje – the first transvestite newspaper in Latin America – and Secretary of Employment Enrique Deibe to train 500 teachers and education administrators on diversity. The initiative led to 20 LGBT persons obtaining certification of their formal education in both La Matanza and Morón. Sacayán had also worked with Deibe in September 2011 in promoting an event at which she was able to impress upon the nearly 200 attendees the need for travesti, transsexuals, and transgender persons to have access to traditional employment.

After the vicious and brutal attack on Nahuel Albornoz in 2014 in Virrey del Pino, Sacayán – on behalf of MAL – and the group Youth for Diversity (JxD) petitioned for the creation of a division to address the inequalities LGBT persons experience which would also serve to education the community on their rights and actively work towards reducing the stigma associated with being LGBT in Argentina by addressing prejudices derived from erroneous myths.

Several of the LGBT civil rights groups came together to work with Diana Conti in 2014 in an attempt to establish Project 8194 which would require the government to compensate individuals detained by government authorities on the basis of the sexual identity or orientation.

=== Visibility ===
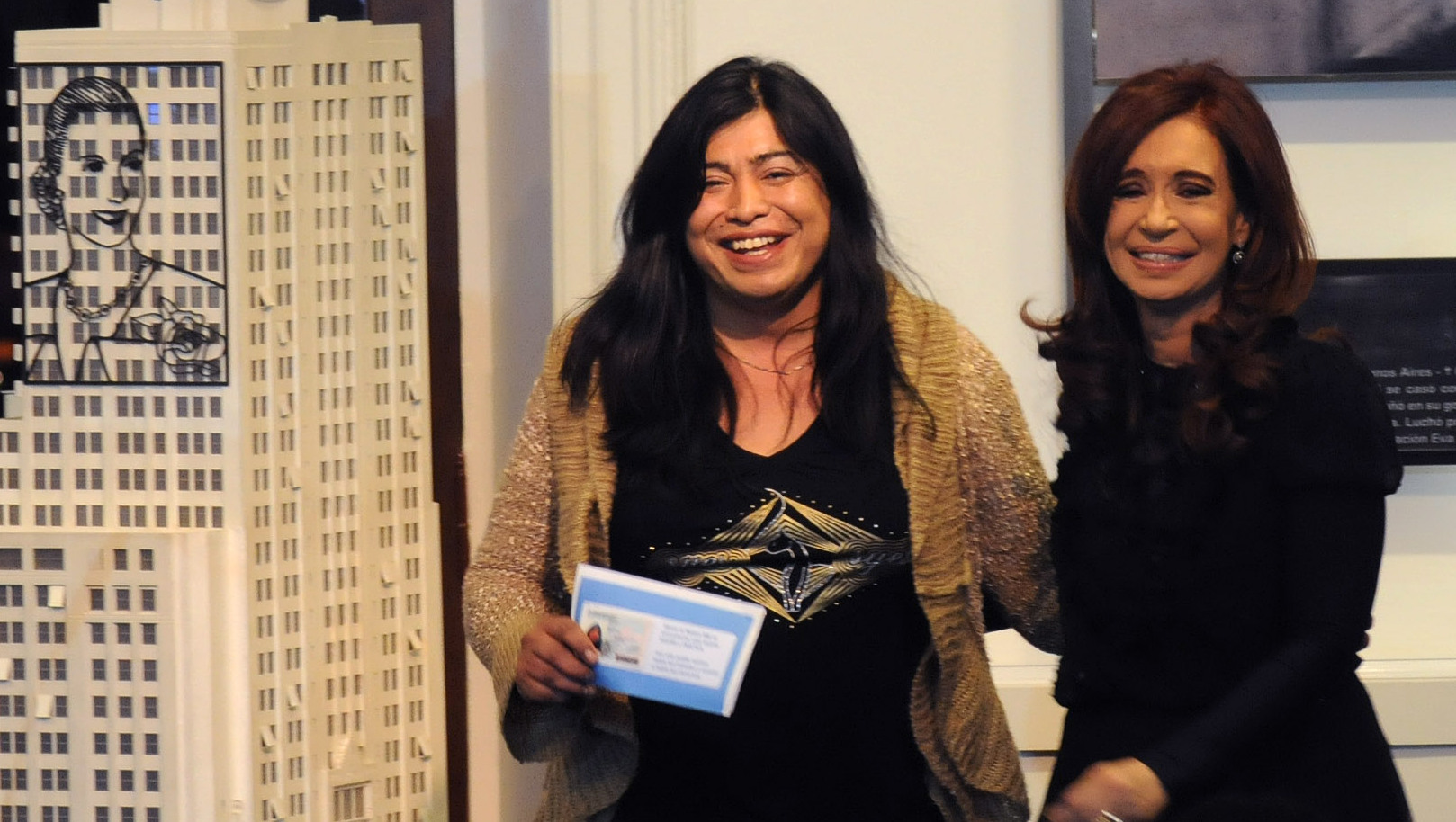
Diana Sacayán with the then president Cristina Fernández de Kirchner receiving her National Identity Document, after the Gender Identity Law was approved in 2012 in Argentina

On 2 July 2012, she received her national identity card as a woman personally from the former president of Argentina, Cristina Fernández de Kirchner.

Sacayán, along with Berkins, aided in the nationwide demonstration on 3 June 2015 decrying femicide in Argentina. The movement spread to several other countries under the name Ni una menos.

=== Arrests ===
Sacayán was arrested on several occasions for offense code violations after coming out as it was illegal in Buenos Aires at the time to be a travesti. She was arrested on 3 February 2001, in Don Bosco, and charged with robbery. She was kept with male prisoners and left without food or blankets for several days. After her release, she stated she had been tortured and that the real reason for her arrest was a refusal to bribe the police. The Undersecretary of Justice of the province of Buenos Aires admitted to keeping Sacayán in Don Bosco due to her being a travesti, and the head of that section of the jail filed a report on Sacayán's 'aggressiveness'. On 19 December 2001, Sacayán was arrested again, this time for her role in protests.

She met Lohana Berkins when she spent nine months in prison in Florencio Varela. Berkins provided legal aid as well as discussing the Unified Left with Sacayán. When discussing her time in police custody in a 2012 editorial, Sacayán plainly stated how an officer beat her repeatedly and demanded that she renounce herself.

When she was arrested alongside her sister Johana on 10 July 2004, the feminist socialist group Bread and Roses [es] supported her actions. Supporters from multiple groups – a total of at least 4,000 people – gathered in the Plaza de Mayo and demanded the release of several prisoners who had been held solely for political reasons. Police released Sacayán from jail but kept her on house arrest. Both Diana and Johana had filed eleven complaints against the Laferrere fourth precinct for unlawful arbitrary detentions; Diana had testified before the Secretariat for Human Rights in Buenos Aires three times and the Ministry of Justice once.

On 9 July 2015, while Sacayán and fellow trans activist Sonia Pamela Díaz waited to board the Metrobús, someone walking past spat insults at them and began to physically assault them. Police responded by arresting Sacayán, Díaz, and another activist, Martín Lanfranco; Sacayán stated that the officers used a taser on her. Sacayán had been pushed into traffic in front of an oncoming taxi, but it was able to brake and avoid hitting her. Police released the activists the following morning, after detaining them between nine and ten hours, prompting Sacayán to file a complaint.

== Death ==
Sacayán was murdered in her apartment in Flores, Buenos Aires between the evening of 10 October and the morning of 11 October 2015 by two assailants. She was handcuffed, gagged, and brutally beaten. One of the assailants kicked her in the face so hard that part of the spiked sole of their shoe was lodged in the skin under her chin. She was stabbed 13 times.

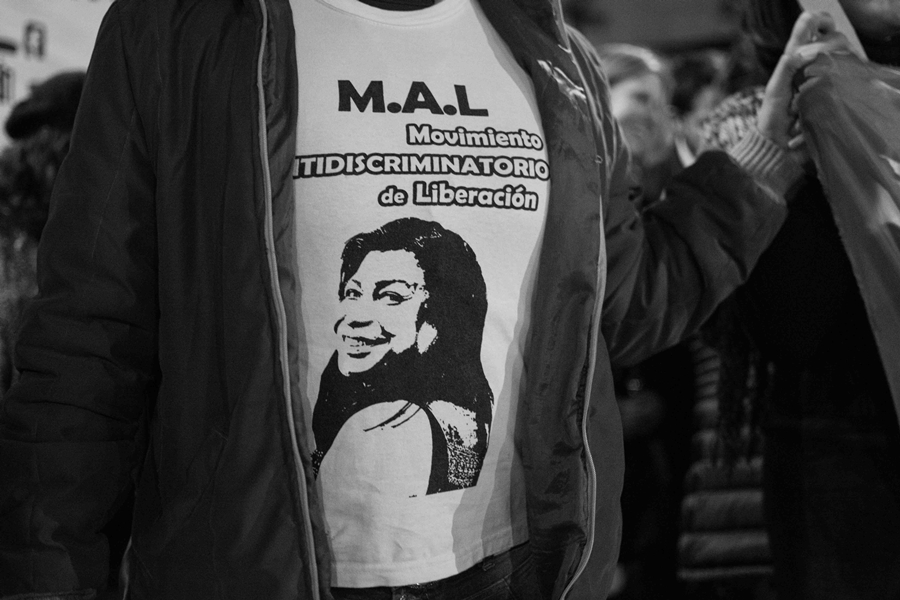
Protestor in the March from the Plaza de Mayo to Congress, the first national march against transvesticide, 28 June 2016

Days afterward, a hundred people gathered in La Plata in a rally to protest Sacayán's murder. Activists continued to protest the following year when the case remained unsolved; the first national march against killing of tranvestites, beginning at the Plaza de Mayo and ending at the Congress building, took place on 28 June 2016.

One of the complaints about how the investigation into Sacayán's murder was being handled is that police treated it as a femicide only. Amnesty International responded to the gruesome murder, stating that if Argentina did not effectively investigate and prosecute the perpetrators, those who killed Sacayán – as well as the individuals responsible for the murders of Marcela Chocobar and Coty Olmos that occurred within the month prior to Sacayán's death – would understand the lack of action as tacit approval to murder trans people.

The police arrested two suspects: Gabriel David Marino and Felix R. Because there was insufficient evidence to prosecute Felix R., the plaintiffs in the case requested that Marino be put on trial alone to keep the case from being closed 'unsolved'. On 14 February 2018, Oral Criminal Court 4 ruled that Marino would remain in custody until at least 27 June 2018 pending the outcome of the trial.

The trial for Marino began on 12 March 2018. For the first time in history, the Argentine Justice acknowledged that the murder was "a hate crime against the travesti identity", known as "travesticide" or "transvesticide" (Spanish: travesticidio; a portmanteau of "travesti" and "homicide"). Marino was sentenced to life imprisonment on 18 June 2018. The ruling was widely celebrated by LGBT activists and has been considered "one more example of the [social] changes underway in Argentina." The verdict was celebrated by INADI as progress towards an inclusive Argentina.

On 7 February 2019, Minister Patricia Bullrich offered a reward of 500,000 Argentine pesos using resolution 67/2019 for information leading to the arrest of the second assailant. The amount was increased to 2 million Argentine pesos on 12 January 2022, per Resolution 36/2022.

On 2 October 2020, the National Chamber of Cassation in Criminal and Correctional Matters confirmed Marino's conviction; however, they removed the transvesticide aspect, stating only that it was aggravated violence based on Sacayán's gender. In his decision, Judge Jorge Luis Rimondi commented that the cuts to Sacayán's breasts did not indicate an intent to convey a message regarding her gender identity. He also cited a lack of any previous report from Sacayán that Marino had expressed transphobic views and that the murder did not occur on a significant date for the LGBT community as grounds to rescind the travesti specific aspect of the judgement. The judges also disputed the autopsy report, saying that there were only 4 stab wounds; the medical examiner recorded a total of 27 wounds on Sacayán's body, 13 of which were caused by a 20-inch blade. This decision was upheld by the Supreme Court, with the vote of irregular member García-Mansilla.

== Legacy ==
On 17 September 2015, the Buenos Aires legislature passed Law 14783, or the Travesti Transsexual Job Quota Law, which made it a requirement that 1% of the jobs in public administration be provided to qualified travesti, transsexuals, and transgender people. Sacayán had started lobbying for the legislation in 2010, working alongside other groups and with representative Karina Nazábal. Regardless of its passage, however, the government of Buenos Aires did not enforce the law.

On 11 June 2021, the Argentine Chamber of Deputies approved the Diana Sacayán – Lohana Berkins Law, enacting the 1% quota on a national level. It also included incentives for private firms to recruit travesti, transsexual, and transgender employees. It passed with 207 votes in favor, 11 against and 7 abstentions. On 24 June 2021, the Argentine Senate passed the act into law, with 55 Senators approving the measure, 1 voting against it, and 6 abstentions.

On 2 July 2023, the Google Doodle depicted Sacayán. On 11 October 2023, Casa Rosada, the official workplace of the President of Argentina, hung an enlarged photograph of Sacayán and one of Claudia Pía Baudracco in the women's and dissidents' room. On 8 March 2024 – International Women's Day – President Javier Milei changed the name of the room to the "Hall of Heroes" and removed all pictures of women activists hanging on its walls, with a spokesperson arguing for Milei that having a room celebrating women is discriminatory to men.

A documentary titled Fue travesticidio has garnered several prizes, including the Work in Progress prize for the 36th Festival de la Mujer y El Cine in 2024.

== Writings ==
Sacayán frequently wrote for El Teje magazine and was the editor of the "I Am" supplement of Página 12.

- La gesta del nombre propio (2006), ISBN 9789871231119
- Cumbia, competeos y lágrimas (2008), ISBN 9789871231799
- Blog de Movimiento Antidiscriminatorio de Liberación (M. A. L.)
