= Multicanal (Argentina) =

Defunct Argentine subscription television and Internet provider company

Multicanal was a subscription television and Internet provider company in Argentina that was owned by Grupo Clarín and operated in Argentina, Paraguay and Uruguay.

== History ==
In the early 1990s, there were two cable companies in Buenos Aires, VCC and Cablevisión. These were followed by two small cable operators in 1991: Buenos Aires Cable and Video Cable Privado. The latter company was later renamed Multicanal in November 1992, when it was acquired by Grupo Clarín. The rename saw the company increase the amount of live Argentine league matches on weekends, increaseing Muchmusic's airtime and the airtime of its movie channel, inherited from VCP, especially during prime time. The amount of satellite-fed services was still limited, which led to the abundance in in-house channels. Chiqui Cable (channel 6) aired a six-hour block of cartoons and brought The Ren & Stimpy Show to Argentina. Cinema (channel 15) was promoted as "There's no hit movie that doesn't air on Cinema. Otherwise, it won't be a hit". Channel 21 was divided between El Canal de Todos (daytime), which inherited La Casa de Nora from VCP and aired canned content such as the telenovela Pasionaria; Metropolitan (from 10:30pm), an arts channel; and Holiday, on weekends, airing miniseries and series.

In 1996, Multicanal adopted a new logo, featuring five stars, the negative space of which formed the letter M.

In July 2000, the provider added Cine Click, followed in August by El Gourmet in the basic service and HBO, HBO Plus and Cinemax in the premium service.

On November 1, 2005, Multicanal took over TVC Uruguay's subscriber base, included in its plans was the launch of an entirely-digital service.

In January 2007, it began a merger process with Cablevisión and in April 2007 it launched its digital television service in Buenos Aires, Greater Buenos Aires, La Plata and Córdoba, whose entry package is the basic package (75 channels), and an additional package with 107 channels (50 various channels, 50 audio channels and 7 radios).

On June 21, 2007, Cablevisión absorbed Multicanal and took over its operations.

In December 2007, the National Commission for the Defense of Competition approved the merger between Multicanal and Cablevisión.

On September 3, 2009, the then Federal Broadcasting Committee (COMFER) denied the merger of Cablevisión and Multicanal, as it would violate the multiplicity of licenses regime established in Law 22285.
