= Mara Gómez =

Argentine footballer

Personal information
- Date of birth: 7 March 1997 (age 29)
- Place of birth: La Plata, Argentina
- Height: 1.72 m (5 ft 8 in)
- Position: Forward

Team information
- Current team: Estudiantes de La Plata
- Number: 21

Senior career*
Years	Team	Apps	(Gls)
2018–2019	Malvinas		
2019–2020	Villa San Carlos		
2022–	Estudiantes	3	(0)
- * Club domestic league appearances and goals as of 14 January 2023

Mara Stefania Gómez (born 7 March 1997) is an Argentine footballer who plays as a striker for Estudiantes. She is the first transgender player to play in the Argentine top flight.

== Career ==
After signing for Primera División side Villa San Carlos, she had her debut in 2020 in a 1–7 loss against Lanús. Her debut marked the first time an openly trans athlete competed in the first division of Argentine football (male or female).

In 2022, Gómez signed for Primera División side Estudiantes de La Plata, becoming the first transgender player to play in an Argentine top flight.
