= Mariela Muñoz =

Argentine activist

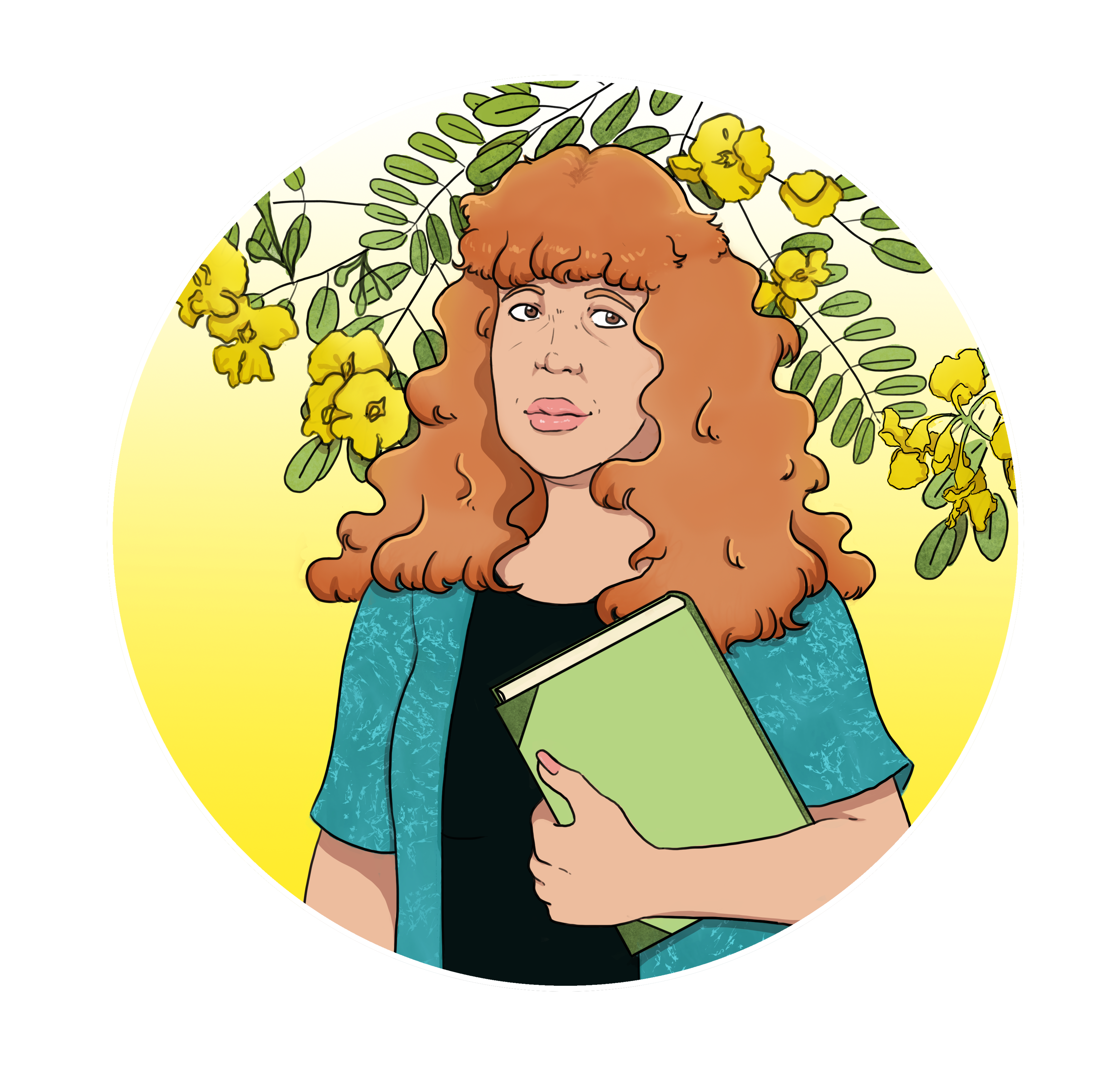
- Illustration of Mariela Muñoz
- Born: 24 December 1943; San Isidro de Lules, Argentina
- Died: 5 May 2017 (aged 73); Greater Buenos Aires, Argentina
- Occupation: Trans rights activist

Mariela Muñoz (24 December 1943 – 5 May 2017) was an Argentine transgender rights activist and politician. She raised twenty-three children over the course of her life. In 1997, she became the first trans woman to be officially recognized by the government of Argentina. She unsuccessfully sought the mayoralty of Quilmes and was active in the Justicialist Party and Renewal Party.

== Early life ==
Muñoz was born on 24 December 1943, in San Isidro de Lules. Much of her childhood was spent in Quilmes. Her father, formerly a sugarcane farmer, became a construction worker to support her and her three brothers. She was already very feminine as a child, and suffered harassment and corrective rape as a result. Her mother was against her femininity, and her father initially took her to prostitutes and psychiatrists as an attempt to change her mind, but he eventually became supportive of her and considered mortgaging their home to pay for her sex reassignment surgery.

When Muñoz became independent, she moved to the suburbs of Buenos Aires and began caring for adolescents, single mothers, and children. During her lifetime she raised 23 children and 30 grandchildren. In 1993, she told Gente that she raised each child until they were married. To support her family, she worked as a tarot reader.

In 1981, Muñoz traveled to Chile for a vaginoplasty, which was done by doctor Guillermo Mac Millan.

In December 1993, a family court judge in Quilmes decided to revoke Muñoz's custody over three children she had adopted and raised, accusing her of having kidnapped them. The judge also issued a suspended sentence of one year in prison. This court case contributed to public awareness of transgender people and their rights in Argentina.

=== Government recognition ===
In May 1997, 41 years after first asking to be called Mariela and 16 years after undergoing sex reassignment surgery, Muñoz successfully acquired a new ID which identified her as female and used the name "Mariela Muñoz", making her the first transsexual woman to be recognized as such by the Argentine government. The judge who ordered the Civil Registry to make the change did so after being presented with several reports by experts in psychology, and after Muñoz argued that she had been psychologically female since childhood, before her sex reassignment surgery in the 1980s. While Muñoz's case set the precedent for future requests by several other people, Argentina would not pass the Gender Identity Law, which granted all transgender people the right to have their gender reflected on their identification, until fifteen years later.

== Later life ==
Muñoz unsuccessfully campaigned to be mayor of Quilmes in 1997. She then ran for provincial deputy with the Justicialist Party in 2003 and the Renewal Party in 2009, wanting to bring attention to the issue of diversity. She was not elected.

In 2013, after Muñoz had a stroke, a judge in Buenos Aires granted her a recurso de amparo so that the government would provide her with money in recognition of the discrimination she had faced. She was 70 years old at the time and did not have enough money to meet her basic needs. By the last year of Muñoz's life, she had suffered three strokes and relied on her adopted children to care for her. She died on 5 May 2017, in Greater Buenos Aires.
