= Esteban Righi =

Argentine lawyer and politician (1938–2019)

Esteban Righi (4 September 1938 – 5 March 2019) was an Argentine lawyer and politician who served as Minister of the Interior and Attorney General.
