= Lohana Berkins =

Argentine activist and educator (1965–2016)

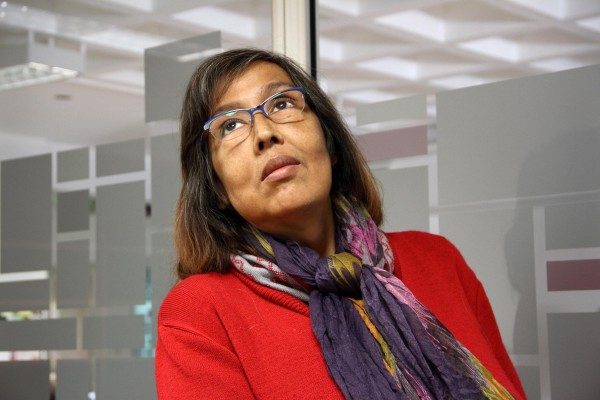
- Berkins in 2014
- Born: 15 June 1965; Pocitos, Salta, Argentina
- Died: 5 February 2016 (aged 50); Buenos Aires, Argentina
- Citizenship: Argentina
- Occupations: Activist; educator
- Years active: 1990-2016

Lohana Berkins (15 June 1965 – 5 February 2016) was an Argentine travesti activist, organizer, and public policy advocate. She was a founder of the Asociación de Lucha por la Identidad Travesti y Transexual (ALITT), and played a central role in advancing transgender and travesti rights in Argentina.

Berkins contributed to debates, public policy, and legislation surrounding gender identity, labor rights, and social inclusion within the Argentine government, workforce, and education system.

== Biography ==
Berkins was born on 15 June 1965 in Pocitos, Salta. Her father, a soldier, kicked her out at the age of 13. She later migrated to Buenos Aires, Argentina, where she remained for the majority of her adult life. Like many travestis, Berkins engaged in prostitution, after migrating to Buenos Aires, due to economic exclusion limiting access to other employment opportunities.

As Berkins got older, she fought against the brutal Argentine police force, in promotion of trans rights, and spent approximately 7 years in prison. This type of conflict with the police is largely left out of the collective Argentine memory of their anti-LGBTQ+ history, and, rather, archives often focus on the military dictatorship oppression. Travestis and transgender people in Argentina were subject to local contravention laws that penalized their public appearance and street-based work, which led to frequent police detention and harassment during the late 20th century.

== Activism ==
In 1994, Berkins founded the Asociación de Lucha por la Identidad Travesti y Transexual (ALITT; lit. 'Association for the Fight for Travesti and Transsexual Identity'), which she presided over until her death. She was the driving force behind Law 3062 on respect for identity adopted by travestis and transsexuals and approved by the Buenos Aires Legislature in 2009.

In the early 1990s, Berkins participated in organizing the Asociación de Mujeres de la Argentina (AMMAR), one of the first labor unions representing and protecting sex workers in the country.

In 2002, Berkins starred in a fundamental demand for the visibility of travestis and trans people by enrolling in Normal School No. 3, to become a teacher. Faced with the impossibility of doing so with her name, she lodged a complaint with the Ombudsman of the City of Buenos Aires, which ordered the school authorities to respect her gender identity.

She was a legislative adviser (mandate fulfilled) at the Autonomous City of Buenos Aires for the Communist Party (led by Patricio Echegaray), thus becoming the first travesti person with a public job. She also worked as a legislative advisor for the Buenos Aires deputy Diana Maffía on issues such as human rights guarantees, women, children, and adolescents.

She was a candidate for national deputy in the year 2001 and was accepted in the electoral lists officialized by the Electoral Justice on the occasion of the renewal of positions of the Argentine Congress.

In 2008, she led the creation of the Nadia Echazú Textile Cooperative, the first Cooperative School for travestis and transsexuals. It was named after Nadia Echazú as a tribute to the trans activist. The labor enterprise managed and administrated by travesti people was inaugurated in mid-2008, in a place donated by the National Institute of Associations and Social Economy.

In 2010, the National Front for the Gender Identity Law was created. It was an alliance of more than fifteen organizations that promoted the sanction at a national level of a law guaranteeing the adaptation of all personal documents to the gender identity perceived and the name chosen by each person and the access to medical treatments for those who request interventions on their body. The bill was finally presented (as a unified project agreed upon between the different social organizations) and accepted. It was the only project that contemplated full access to health care.

The Gender Identity Law was approved by the Argentine parliament on 9 May 2012 and promulgated by President Cristina Fernández de Kirchner a few days later, becoming the most advanced in the world in this matter so far. It was the first law to recognize the gender identity of people in terms of self-perception and guarantee full access to health, depathologizing trans identities.

In 2013, she was appointed head of the Office of Gender Identity and Sexual Orientation, which operates under the auspices of the Gender Observatory in the Justice Department of the City of Buenos Aires.

== Death and Legacy ==
Berkins died in the Hospital Italiano in Buenos Aires on 5 February 2016.

In 2020, the Argentinian government passed the Diana Sacayán-Lohana Berkins Law, which requires the national public sector set aside a minimum of 1% of employment positions for transgender people.

Berkins has also been cited as an influence on the development of LGBTQIA+-inclusive educational initiatives, such as the Mocha Celis Popular Travesti-Trans High School located in Buenos Aires, Argentina.

On 20 July 2011, the government of the Province of Buenos Aires awarded her a distinction as the owner of the Nadia Echazú Textile Cooperative, called "The Inclusion Tree." On 11 October of that same year, she was declared Outstanding Personality of Human Rights by the Buenos Aires Legislature.

In 2012, she received the nomination for the Democracy Awards presented by the Caras y Caretas Cultural Center in the Human Rights category.

== Bibliography ==
=== Books ===
- 2005. Berkins, Lohana; Fernández, Josefina (coords.). La gesta del nombre propio: informe sobre la situación de la comunidad travesti en la Argentina. Buenos Aires: Madres de Plaza de Mayo.
- 2007. Korol, Claudia; Berkins, Lohana, (coords.). Diálogo: "prostitución/trabajo sexual: las protagonistas hablan". Buenos Aires: Feminaria. ISBN 9789872199968.
- 2007. Berkins, Lohana. Cumbia, copeteo y lágrimas. Buenos Aires: ALITT. ISBN 978-987-24065-0-9.
- 2008. Berkins, Lohana. Escrituras, polimorfías e identidades. Buenos Aires: Libros del Rojas. ISBN 978-987-1075-79-9.

=== Book chapters ===
- 2003. "Un itinerario político del travestismo". In Maffía, Diana (comp.). Sexualidades migrantes: género y transgénero. Buenos Aires: Feminaria. ISBN 987-9143-05-1.
- 2004. "Eternamente atrapadas por el sexo". Fernández, Josefina; D'Uva, Mónica; Viturro, Paula (coords.). Cuerpos ineludibles: un diálogo a partir de las sexualidades en América Latina. Buenos Aires: Ají de Pollo. ISBN 987-21685-0-4.
- 2008. "Travestis: una identidad política". Grande, Alfredo (comp.). La sexualidad represora. Buenos Aires: Topía. ISBN 9789871185238.
- 2010. "Travestismo, transsexualidad y transgeneridad". In Raíces Montero, Jorge Horacio (coord.). Un cuerpo, mil sexos: intersexualidades. Topía. ISBN 978-987-1185-74-0.

== Filmography ==
Participation in the documentary Furia travesti, a story about the experience of the Nadia Echazú Textile Cooperative, directed by Amparo González Aguilar in 2010.
