= Marlene Wayar =

Argentine LGBT rights activist

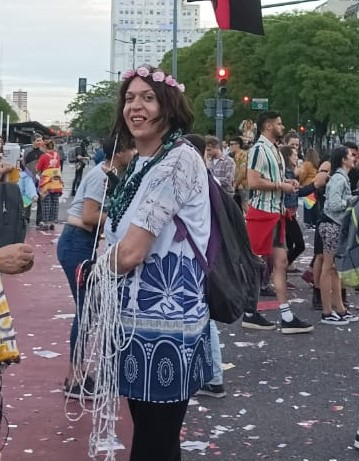
- Wayar in 2021
- Born: 14 October 1968 (age 58); Córdoba, Argentina
- Education: Instituto Universitario de Madres de Plaza de Mayo
- Occupation: Social psychologist
- Notable work: Travesti: una teoría lo suficientemente buena
- Awards: Lola Mora Award (2011)

Marlene Wayar (born 14 October 1968) is an Argentine social psychologist, travesti-transgender activist, and author of the book Travesti: una teoría lo suficientemente buena (Cross-dressing [Travesti]: A Good Enough Theory).

== Biography ==
Marlene Wayar is the general coordinator of Futuro Transgenerico - an organization with which she was part of the National Front for the Gender Identity Law – and co-founder of the Silvia Rivera Trans Network of Latin America and the Caribbean.

She is the director of El Teje, the first travesti newspaper in Latin America, developed from a workshop held at the Ricardo Rojas Cultural Center.

She studied Social Psychology at the Instituto Universitario de Madres de Plaza de Mayo.

She is one of the founders of the Nadia Echazú Textile Cooperative, a workshop-school named in honor of the trans rights activist. The project was inaugurated in mid 2008, in a location donated by the National Institute of Associations and Social Economy (INAES).

Wayar was host of the series Género identidad. La diversidad en el cine (Gender Identity: Diversity in the Cinema), broadcast by Encuentro in 2011.

== Awards and distinctions ==
A few weeks into the Trans Literacy Center's second year, the Popular Library of Gender, Sexual Affective Diversity, and Human Rights of the Argentine province of Tucumán (CRISÁLIDA) reported that, as a result of a poll, alumni and participants proposed adding "Marlene Wayar" to the center's name. This was accepted unanimously by the organization's Directive Commission and announced to the Network of Women of Tucumán (co-participants of the project).

In September 2011, Wayar received the Lola Mora Award from the Buenos Aires City Legislature for the publication El Teje.

== Publications ==
- Travesti: una teoría lo suficientemente buena (2018), Editorial Muchas Nueces, ISBN 9789874670243
