= Gender Identity Law (Argentina) =

2012 transgender-related law in Argentina

National Congress of Argentina
- Citation: Law 26,743
- Territorial extent: Argentina
- Passed by: Chamber of Deputies
- Passed: 1 December 2011
- Passed by: Senate
- Passed: 9 May 2012
- Enacted: 24 May 2012
- Effective: 1 June 2012 (Note: In Argentina, unless otherwise stated, laws come into effect eight days after their publication in the government gazette.)

Legislative history

Initiating chamber: Chamber of Deputies
- Introduced by: Diana Conti; Juliana Di Tullio; Silvana Giudici
- Introduced: 8 November 2011

Summary
- Recognition of self-perceived gender identity in government documents and healthcare

Keywords
- Gender identity; identity document; universal health care
- Status: In force

The Gender Identity Law (Spanish: Ley de identidad de género), Argentina's law number 26,743, allows transgender people to be treated according to their gender identity and have their personal documents registered with the corresponding name and gender. In addition, it orders that all medical treatments for transitioning be included in the Compulsory Medical Program, which guarantees coverage by practices throughout the health system, both public and private. Approved by the Senate on 9 May 2012 and promulgated on 24 May, it has been lauded by the United Nations as a pioneering step for transgender rights in the region.

== History ==
=== Background ===
The most remote antecedent regarding the question of gender identity in Argentina dates back to 1966, in which a doctor performed a sex reassignment operation on a trans woman patient. He received a suspended sentence of three years for the crime of very serious injuries under Article 91 of the country's Penal Code.

In 1989, Judge Mario Calatayud of Room F of the National Chamber of Civil Appeals of Buenos Aires, in dissent with the presiding majority, granted the first recognition of the gender identity of a trans woman who had requested a change to her registered name and sex. In 1997, a case emerged that captivated the mass media. It was that of a trans woman, Mariela Muñoz, who had raised a large number of children as her own, and had been denounced by one of the mothers for the appropriation of her minor children.

Beginning in 2007, a number of legislative proposals were promoted to guarantee travestis, transsexual, and transgender people rights to identity and comprehensive health care. Using a strategy almost identical to that with which approval of the same-sex marriage law was achieved, several amparo cases were brought before the Tribunals in Contentious Administrative and Tax Matters of the City of Buenos Aires with the purpose of ordering modifications to the registered name and sex of trans individuals. The first of these rulings pertained to the trans actress and vedette Florencia De La V, who received her reissued National Identity Document (DNI) from the hands of the Chief of the Cabinet of Ministers Aníbal Fernández and Interior Minister Florencio Randazzo in the House of Government. In 2012, shortly prior to the Gender Identity Law's passing, activist Alejandra Ironici became the first transgender person to legally change their gender through wholly administrative steps.

=== Processing of the law ===
On 8 November 2011, the author and the General Legislation and Justice Commissions of the National Congress discussed the bill presented by deputies Diana Conti, Juliana Di Tullio, and Silvana Giudici, and approved its dispatch for further processing.

On 1 December 2011 the Chamber of Deputies approved the draft law by 167 votes in favor, 17 against, and 7 abstentions. The Gender Identity Law was approved by the Senate on 9 May 2012, by 55 votes in favor and one abstention. It was promulgated by Decree No. 773/2012 of the National Executive Power on 24 May 2012 and carries number 26.743. The law was regulated by Decree 1007/2012. The National Registry of Persons became the specialized unit for advice and assistance on matters within the scope of the law.

On 26 May, the Office of the United Nations High Commissioner for Human Rights issued a statement of congratulation for the law, saying "Argentina has taken an important step to guarantee equality, respect, and dignity for trans people."

== Rights recognized ==
The Gender Identity Law allows a person to modify their personal data in the National Registry and to change their registered name, image, and sex by submitting a letter. The DNI number is not modified. This process is free and does not require a lawyer.

The law also grants access to hormonal treatments and total or partial surgical interventions for the purpose of transitioning, without the need of a previous gender dysphoria diagnosis or a referral letter from mental health professionals. Hospitals must cover these treatments and procedures as part of the Compulsory Medical Plan, which comprises the essential basic benefits that insurance providers must guarantee to all beneficiaries.

== See also ==
- Transgender rights in Argentina
- Diana Sacayán - Lohana Berkins Law
