= LGBTQ history in Argentina =

The history of lesbian, gay, bisexual, transgender, and queer people (LGBTQ) in Argentina is shaped by the historic characterisation of non-heterosexuality as a public enemy: when power was exercised by the Catholic Church, it was regarded as a sin; during the late 19th and early 20th centuries, when it was in the hands of positivist thought, it was viewed as a disease; and later, with the advent of civil society, it became a crime.

The indigenous peoples of the pre-Columbian era had practices and assessments on sexuality that differed from those of the Spanish conquistadors, who used their sinful "sodomy" to justify their barbarism and extermination.

In the late 1960s and early 1970s, the first activist groups of the country appeared, most notably the leftist Frente de Liberación Homosexual (FLH), whose immediate forebear was Nuestro Mundo, the first gay rights organization in Latin America. The arrival of the last civic-military dictatorship in 1976—with its subsequent intensification of state terrorism—dissolved these activist efforts, and the local movement often denounces that there were at least four hundred LGBT people among the desaparecidos. The end of military rule in 1983 was followed by a flourishing of lesbian and gay life in the country which, combined with the continued repression, resulted in a resurgence of activism, within which the role of Carlos Jáuregui and the Comunidad Homosexual Argentina (CHA) stood out.

During the 1990s, the local LGBT activism continued to expand, and the first pride marches of the country took place. During the decade, the travesti and transgender rights movement emerged, spearheaded by figures such as Mariela Muñoz, Karina Urbina, Lohana Berkins, María Belén Correa and Claudia Pía Baudracco. Through the 1980s and until the mid-1990s, the nascent LGBT movement was primarily concerned with issues such as homophobia, police violence, and the HIV/AIDS pandemic. One of its first great achievements was the repeal of police edicts (Spanish: "edictos policiales") in 1996, used by the Federal Police to arrest LGBT people. In 2000, a civil union bill was introduced in the Buenos Aires legislature, and two years later the city was first in the region to have a law granting legal recognition to same-sex couples.

In the early 2010s, Argentina established itself as a pioneering country in terms of LGBT rights, with the passing of the Equal Marriage Law (Spanish: Ley de Matrimonio Igualitario) in 2010—becoming the tenth country to do so—and the Gender Identity Law (Spanish: Ley de Identidad de Género) in 2012—which allows people to officially change their gender identities without facing barriers such as hormone therapy, surgery, psychiatric diagnosis or judge approval. Since 2019, the country has an official ministry of Women, Genders and Diversity. In 2021, the Cupo Laboral Trans law was passed—which established a 1% quota for trans workers in civil service jobs— and the country became the first in Latin America to recognise non-binary gender identities in its national identification cards and passports.

== Indigenous peoples ==
=== Andean peoples ===
The Inca Empire (in Quechua: Tawantinsuyu) extended to part of the modern-day Argentine provinces of Jujuy, Salta, Catamarca, Tucumán, La Rioja, San Juan, and the northwest of Mendoza, incorporating them to the Qullasuyu administrative region.

According to journalist Edmundo Fayanas Escuer, homosexuality was frequently practiced in the Inca Empire—being closely linked with religious life—and lesbianism was permitted and even idealized within the noble classes. Among the ruins of Machu Picchu in Peru, skeletons of two young men were found surrounded by feminine ornaments and without any masculine attributes.

Nevertheless, Juan José Sebreli noted that: "This does not mean, however, that sexual permissiveness reigned in indigenous cultures, in the style of lost paradises that utopian anthropologists like Margaret Mead believe they find in primitive peoples. In the most advanced pre-Columbian civilizations, on the contrary, homosexuality was repressed more viciously than among Europeans; the Incas completely destroyed the sites where a case of sodomy was discovered."

=== Guaraní and Guaycurú peoples ===
In his 1946 study "Ethnography of the Chaco" (Spanish: "Etnografía del Chaco"), anthropologist Alfred Métraux reported that berdaches were very common among the Mbayá people, writing: "They dressed and spoke like women, pretended to menstruate, and engaged in feminine activities. They were regarded as the prostitutes of the village." According to Alberto Cardín, even though Métraux wrote on the Mbayá people, this was the name that the Guaraní gave in past times to the nomadic tribes of the Guaicuruan languages, who inhabited the other side of the Paraguay River. Pierre Clastres lived for a year among the Guaycurú people and reported two paradigmatic cases: that of Chachubutagachugi, a member of the Aché tribe who did not like men's jobs and worked alongside women; and that of Krembegin, an unapologetic homosexual who was frowned upon but never punished. Likewise, in the mid-19th century the Brazilian Historic and Geographic Institute reported on the homosexuality of the Guaycurú: "Among the Guaycurú and the Xamico, there are some men [...], whom they call cudinhos, who serve as women, mainly on long trips. These cudinhos or nefarious demons, dress and adorn themselves like women, talk like them, they do only the same jobs that they do, they urinate on their knees, they have a husband whom they are very jealous of and constantly hold in their arms, they appreciate that men fall in love with them and once a month they affect a ridiculous pretense that they are supposed to be menstruating, not eating, like women in those crises, neither fish nor meat, only fruits and palm hearts, going every day, as they practice, to the river with a basin to wash themselves."

=== Mapuche peoples ===
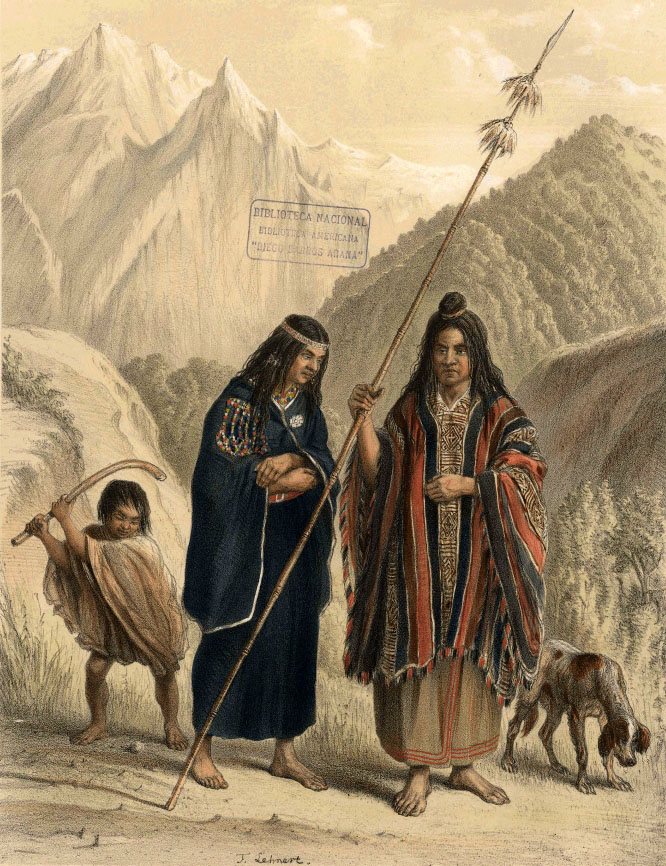
Depiction of a Mapuche family from the Araucanía region, c. 1854.

The Mapuche peoples—who inhabited part of the current territories of Chile and Argentina—had a notion of sexual identity and practice that differed from those of Spanish conquistadors, who reduced their complexity under the concept of "sodomy". According to Chilean writer Tomás Guevara, who studied the Mapuche people in the early 20th century:

"[Mapuche] society did not stigmatize pederasty, which was not as widespread [among them] as in Inca communities. In Arauco, it was practiced freely by the machi, male healers. It seems that sodomy was an integral part of ancient and modern 'machism'. The chroniclers of the 17th century mention the existence of this deviation from genetic functions and describe the ways and the exterior of these pederasts. In the learning of 'machism' for men, the art of leaving their sex or of copying females in walking and dressing, in gestures, voice and looks was understood. They painted their faces and adorned themselves like women. They chose an invariably young man, who played the role of husband. They were these passive pederast machi and rarely experienced lewd feelings about women. The young men destined to satisfy the inverted sexual activity of these individuals were made the butt of ridicule by others, and nothing more. They never denied their status as active pederasts because they feared that by refusing, they could father defective children if they married. [The Mapudungun language] designates the homosexual with the word huelle and homosexuality with huelletun."

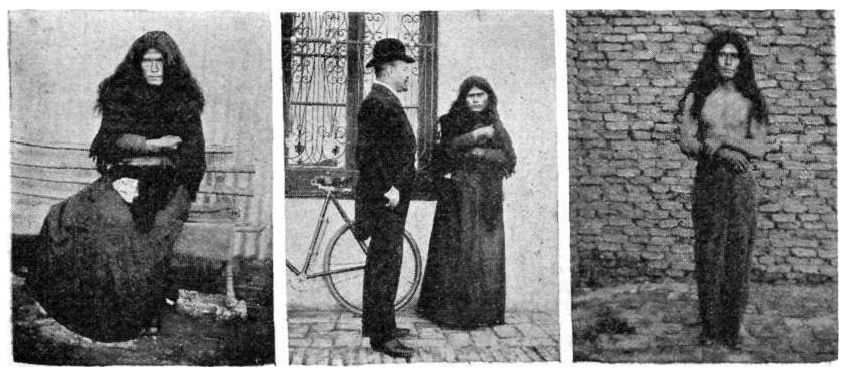
An indigenous "sexual invert"—presumably a Mapuche machi weye—detained in Viedma, Río Negro, as reported by Caras y Caretas in 1902; shown dressed in female clothing (left), being inspected by a physician (center), and half-dressed in male clothing (right).

In the same way, anthropologist Alfred Métraux reported that: "The male shamans today are, as before, berdaches, to use an old French word formerly applied to people of their kind among the Indians of North America. Núñez de Pineda y Bascuñán, who knew them well in the 18th century, qualifies them as passive homosexuals (hueye). He describes them as dressed in loincloths tied at the waist in the manner of women and in a long tunic.' He adds: 'They did not dress like a man, but wore their hair long, while the others braided it. They were adorned with necklaces, rings and other feminine jewels. They were highly esteemed and respected by men and women; with the latter they behaved like men, and with the former like women.' Among the [Mapuche] of the Argentine pampas, a young man of delicate constitution who acted more like a girl than a future warrior, was not for that reason despised, he was not an object of ridicule. His tendencies were stimulated since they dressed him as a woman; an effeminate appearance was in a man the outer mark of his shamanic vocation."

However, more recent studies point out that, by translating the colonial codes of "sodomy" into the sexuality of machis—isolating them from their historical and socio-political contexts—European settlers were unable to truly understand Mapuche sexuality.Unlike what the Spaniards interpreted, the Mapuches considered that, while political power was masculine, spiritual power was linked to femininity. For them, in addition to men and women, there was at least one more gender identity and they accepted many different types of sexual acts. Until the late 17th century, shamans—then known as machi weye—were men with special powers due to their permanent dual gender identities and relationships with spirits, which allowed them to act as mediators between the human and spiritual world. The machi weye oscillated between the feminine and masculine poles, combining male and female behaviors, dress, and styles in various ways. This dual gender condition could be associated with active or passive sexual acts with men or women or with celibacy, the meanings of which varied depending on the context. A man who became "effeminate" did not lose any status, as womanhood and feminity were valued socially. According to Chilean anthropologist Ana Mariella Bacigalupo, the sexual acts of the machi weye in the Colonial era were not homosexual, heterosexual or bisexual; but rather linked to spirituality. Through colonization, the Mapuche people eventually incorporated the sexual ideology of the conquistadors, and many modern-day Mapuches claim that homosexuality never existed among them, but that they were practices introduced by the Spanish.

=== Pampa peoples ===
The various indigenous groups that inhabited the Pampas region were grouped under the name of Pampas by colonizers, who sometimes made the distinction between these and the so-called Serranos, those who inhabited places farther away from the lowlands, such as San Luis, Córdoba and the Sierra de la Ventana mountains. The Pampas label was variously used to include the Mbeguá, Tehuelche, Ranquel and Querandí peoples, among others.

In the second half of the 19th century, with the indigenous tribes already in their decline, Lucio Victorio Mansilla reported in 1870 on the Ranquel people's orgiastic dances between men, writing: "They kissed, they bit each other, they threw obscene hands..."

== 16th–18th centuries: Colonial era ==
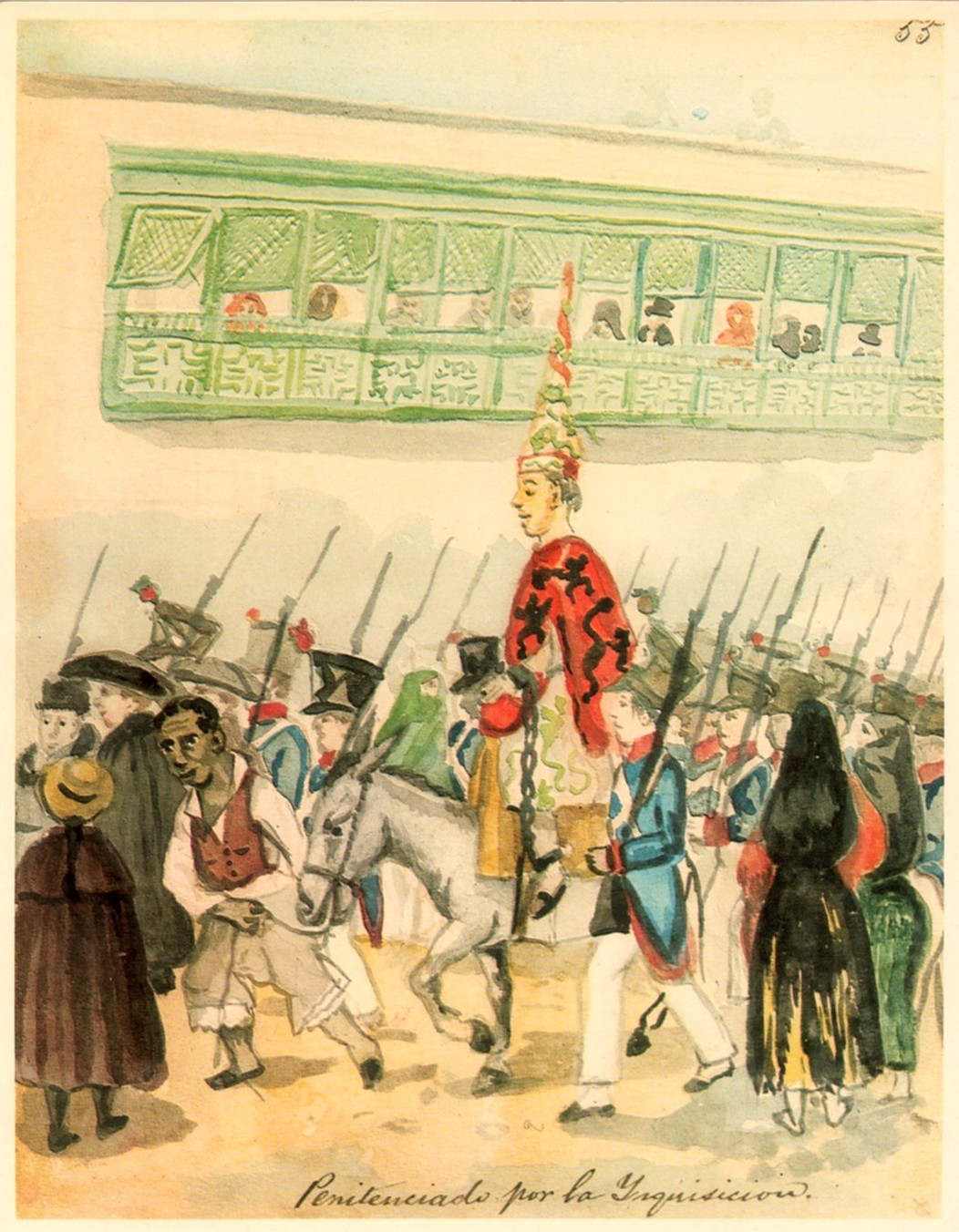
Painting by Pancho Fierro depicting the Peruvian Inquisition—which had jurisprudence on present-day Argentina—parading a detainee in the streets of Lima.

The repression of homosexuality was legalized in Spain with the establishment of the absolutist monarchy: the Catholic Monarchs instituted the death penalty at the stake for the act of "sodomy" or "nefarious contra natura sin" in 1497, and King Philip II revalidated it in practice in 1598. On January 25, 1569, Philip II created the Inquisition Tribunals of Lima and Mexico, with the former having jurisprudence on the current Argentine territory. As explained by Professor Jaime Humberto Borja Gómez:

... a distinctive feature of the Inquisition in the Americas was that the accusation (of homosexuality) fell especially upon the cultural groups that diverged from the cultural norm that the conquistadors had, that is, the accusation of homosexuality was brought against the indigenous Americans that resisted the Conquista, which also intensified the idea of the Just War. Later, the same accusation of "infamous" behavior was brought to bear on black slaves and their strange attitudes. This imputation was not rare in Christian thought, since it had been carried out throughout the history of medieval thought, which accused of sexual excess, especially homosexuality, all those out-groups that represented a danger to the social order: this was done to heretics, Jews or Templars. It was a way of diminishing the "other", feminizing them, to highlight their "barbaric" customs. In fact, homosexuality was a characteristic of the "barbarian" according to some sources of classical antiquity.

The jurists, theologians and moralists of the 16th and 17th centuries defined homosexual sexual acts with the term "sodomy". From this definition, a "ranking" of sins was built according to their level of transgression, and at the top was the "sin contra natura" or, more euphemistically, the so-called "nefarious sin" (Spanish: "pecado nefando"). In addition to being theologically defined as sins, these sexual practices constituted crimes in the legal sense, which was nourished by both Roman law and the canon law and religious tradition of the Middle Ages. The prevailing criminal legislation in the Viceroyalty of the Río de la Plata back in the 18th century considered that sexual excesses, execrable adultery, illicit friendship, homosexuality, etc., should be punishable as crimes against honesty, since the dominant idea in the legal doctrine of the era considered marriage as a sacrament. At the local level, the justice system incorporated the resolutions of the synodal congresses held in the Southern Cone, among which we can cite the 1603 Synodal constitution of the first council of Río de la Plata in Asunción, the Synod of Córdoba in 1700 carried out by Bishop Mercadillo, or the Synod of Bishop Fray Cristóbal de la Mancha y Velasco of 1655, among other meetings that issued codes referring to relations between men and women, norms that transcended in the time.

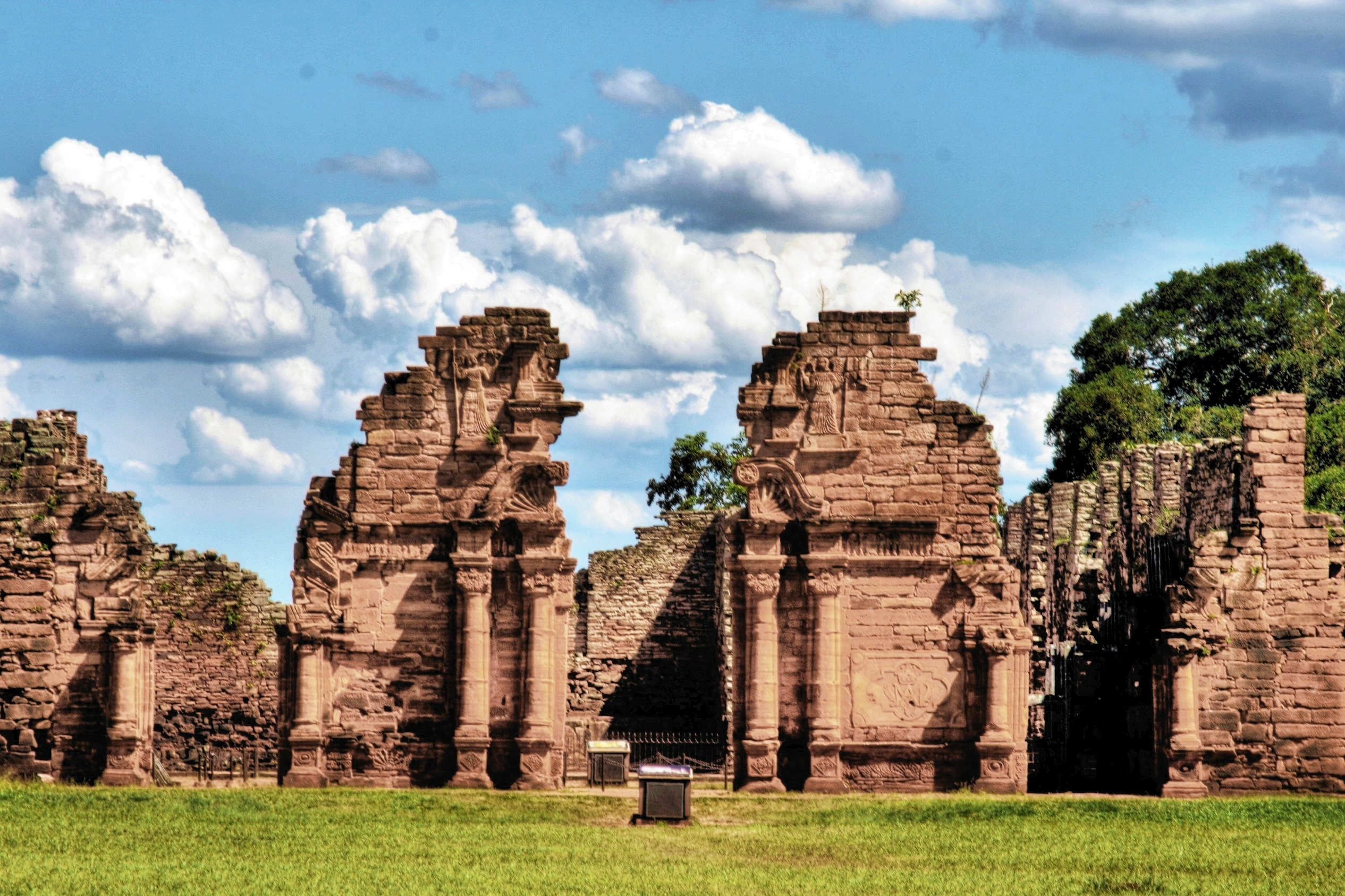
The ruins of San Ignacio Miní in present-day Misiones, one of the several 17th century Jesuit reductions where the Guaraní people were Christianized.

The homosexual practices of the indigenous peoples continued in the Colonial era, especially in the communal life of the Jesuit reductions. Beginning in the 17th century, Jesuit missionaries founded thirty of these reductions for Guaraní people, two of them located in the current provinces of Misiones and Corrientes. Seeking to evangelize the natives, the missionaries adopted Guaraní religious figures and beliefs to impose those of Christianity. For example, missionary Luis de Bolaños intervened the myth of the creation of the Ypacaraí river, relating it to the biblical story of Sodom and Gomorrah, especially the idea of divine punishment for homosexuality. According to this version, the gods punished the homosexuality of ancient villagers by making the earth thunder and flooding the villages of Tapaikuá and Arekayá. In this way, the repression of sexuality was introduced, which the Guaraní were far from considering as a problem. For the Jesuit missionaries, Guaraní beliefs and mythologies did not go beyond superstitions, but they took advantage of them to impose themselves.

The punishment of homosexuality among the indigenous peoples carried out by Spanish authorities consisted, in the early days of the colony, in throwing them to wild dogs so that they could be eaten alive. Later, the penalties for homosexuals, both indigenous and European, where death by burning or by hanging, and their ashes were thrown to the wind, because unlike other convicts they did not deserve a Christian burial. In 1770, viceroy Juan José de Vértiz y Salcedo ordered that vagabonds—including homosexuals although without naming them—were to be confined in the Falkland Islands (locally: Islas Malvinas), after being exposed in the town square to be mocked. The first mention of homosexuality in Buenos Aires was in 1771, in a legal complaint for slander that the Englishman Guillermo Higgings initiated against Criollo Manuel Milton. The following year, the first public scandal occurred in the city, when Mariano de los Santos Toledo, who had relations with an Arab named Mateo, was denounced for wanting to abuse a twelve-year-old boy and, given his resistance, trying to assassinate him.

== Early 19th century: Independence era ==
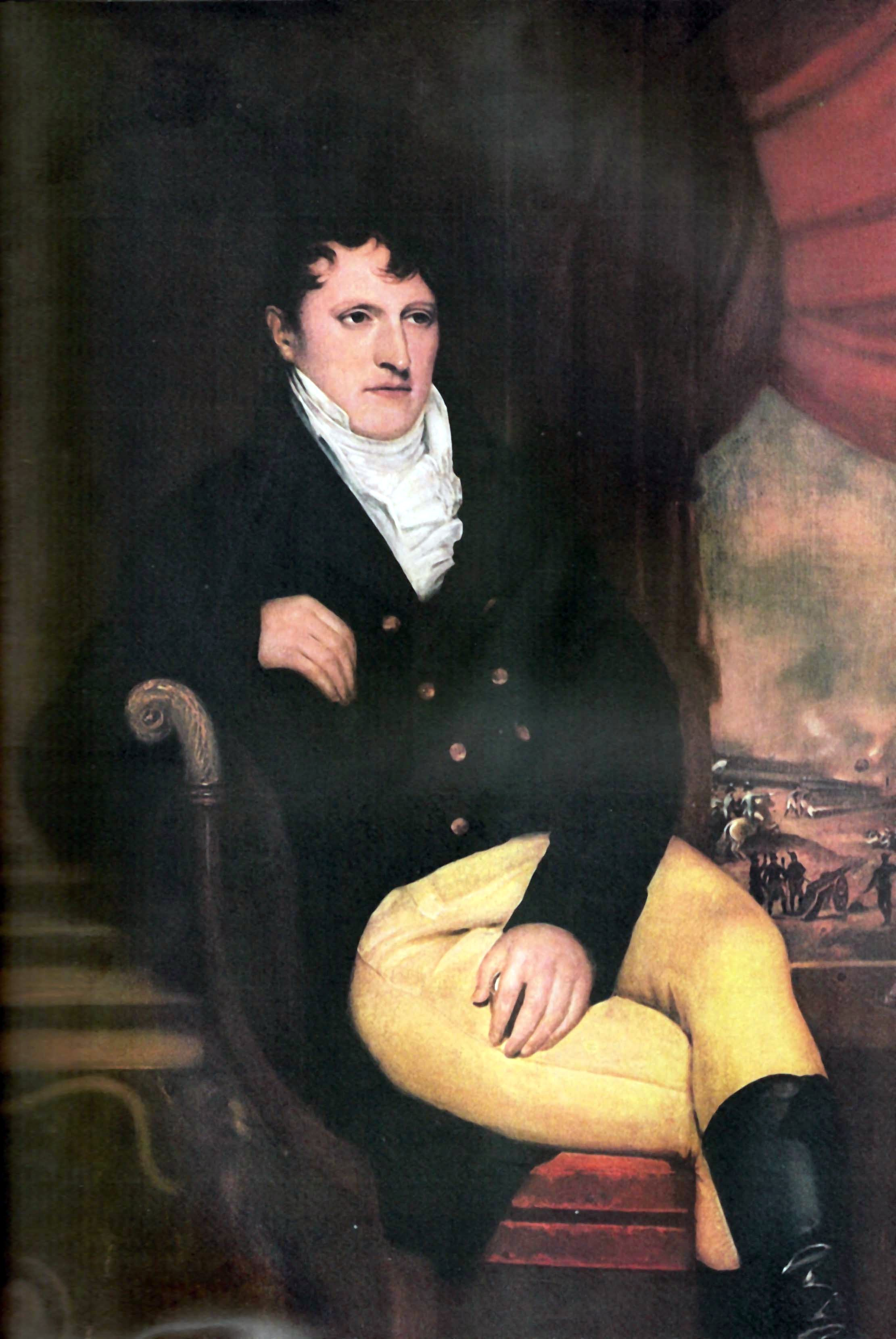
The alleged homosexuality of Manuel Belgrano, one of the main Libertadores of the country, has been established as a long-lasting rumor.

On March 23, 1813, the Assembly of the Year XIII suppressed the authority of the Inquisition. Homosexuality then entered a non liquet from which it did not emerge until well into the 20th century. In accordance with the Napoleonic Code, it ceased to be a punishable crime, so there are not testimonies of the sort, while at the same time it did not enter into conventional customs and was therefore not discussed. There are some testimonies that give an account of the homophobic mentality during the first years of independence, such as a note that a Buenos Aires resident named Juan Madera sent in 1813 to the police mayor, in which he accused various men of introducing sodomy in the city.

It is probable that some of Argentina's independence heroes were homosexuals, although there is no historical proof of this. A famous, long-lasting question is the alleged homosexuality of Manuel Belgrano, one of the main Libertadores of the country. The myth has its origin in defamatory gossip spread by his enemies during the revolutionary years, which pointed to his thin voice, his sensitive and polite manners and his intimate friendship with his physician John Redhead. Historian Felipe Pigna has suggested that these rumours were a reaction to Belgrano's defense of women's right to education. Proponents of Belgrano's heterosexuality—including Pigna— claim that his two illegitimate children are irrefutable evidence. Homosexual tendencies can be inferred in Juan Bautista Alberdi, a bachelor concerned with the arts and fashions who was criticized by Domingo Faustino Sarmiento as "an abbot for his manners and a woman for his voice."

Homosexuality in the time of Juan Manuel de Rosas is attested by the stigmatization of the Unitarians to the Federals with the term "sodomites" and of the Federals to the Unitarians as "maricones" (i.e. "faggots"). This attribution of roles was also derived from the custom of the Mazorca members of sodomizing young Unitarians, as documented in Esteban Echeverría's El matadero (1839). The repressed homosexuality became visible during the Buenos Aires Carnival festivities, so much so that in 1836 Rosas prescribed its rules, prohibiting "wearing a costume that does not correspond to one's sex." There are no historical sources about lesbianism of the time, although a relationship between Manuela Rosas and her cousin Dolores Fuentes can be inferred, as documented in some love letters, in one of which the former wrote: "How inhumane are my uncles who have taken a friend from me who is as if she were my wife!"

== Late 19th, 20th and 21st centuries ==
=== 1880–1916: The Conservative Republic ===
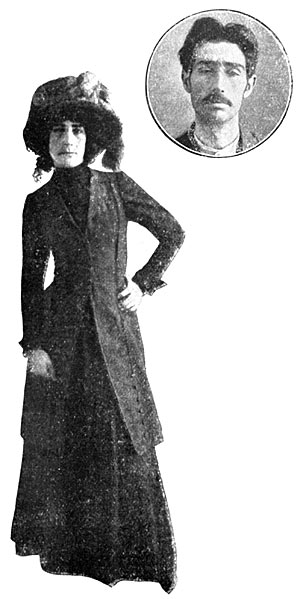
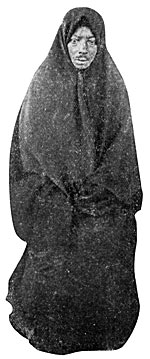
Two crossdressing swindlers from Buenos Aires in 1912: Juan Montes aka "La bella Noé" (left) and Antonio Gutiérrez Pombo aka "La rubia Petronila" (right).

During the government of the Generation of '80, deviant sexualities were soon linked to Jewish and Italian immigrants, the latter associated with anarchism, socialism and trade unionism. In this context, literature contributed to the emergence of these stereotypes and prejudices; for example, Eugenio Cambaceres' En la sangre (1887), uses the image of an "invert" child to represent the anomaly of Italian immigrants, while Julián Martel's La bolsa (1891), represents the stereotype of Jewish homosexuality.

In 1886 a new Penal Code was promulgated, in which there was no mention of homosexuality. Consensual homosexuality between adults came to be considered a private act, although sodomy with minors or practiced in a violent way or with physically or mentally disabled people was punished. More than an advance of individual freedoms, the adoption of this theory meant the virtual and desired elimination of homosexuality from Argentine written works, so as to give a better image to potential European immigrants.

There was a complex and visible culture of homosexuals and travestis that extended in all the social classes of Buenos Aires during this period.

One of the first historical records of gay life in Buenos Aires were the criminal careers of several crossdressing swindlers, who were profiled by hygienists. A 1912 article published by Fray Mocho reported that this gang of crossdressing criminals made up of about three thousand men, which represented about 0.5 percent of the male population of Buenos Aires at that time.

The medical journal Archives of Psychiatry and Criminology Applied to Related Sciences (Spanish: "Archivos de Psiquiatría y Criminología Aplicadas a las Ciencias Afines"), published by physicians Francisco de Veyga and José Ingenieros between 1902 and 1910, are the best record of Argentine queer life at the beginning of the 20th century.

The authorities' fear of "militant homosexuals" shows that the ideas of German and English homosexual activists such as Havelock Ellis and Magnus Hirschfeld had arrived to Buenos Aires and, indeed, the document evidence point out that the maricas of Buenos Aires consistently used the discourse of German activists to resist that of science men.

As for lesbianism, tango singer Pepita Avellaneda is said to have disputed with Carlos Gardel the love of a lady named Jeanne. Avellaneda and other female tango singers such as Linda Thelma, Rosita Quiroga and Paquita Bernardo presented a highly masculinized image in their performances.

=== 1930–1945: The Infamous Decade ===
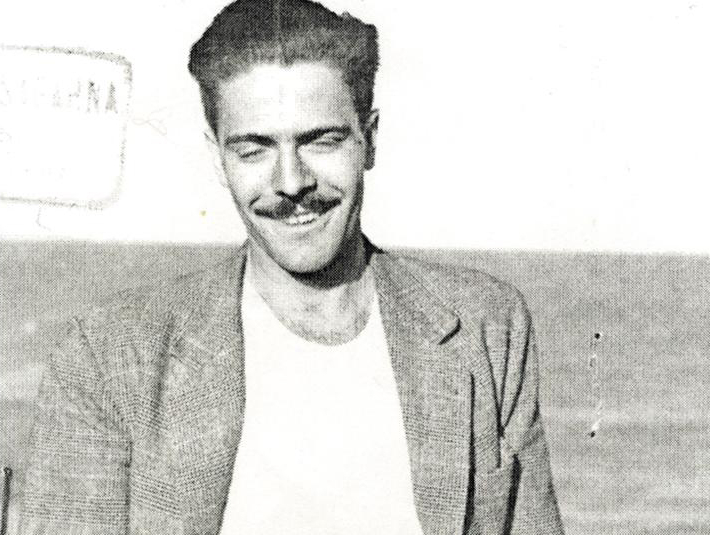
Adolfo José Goodwin, one of the main gay men persecuted as part of the infamous cadet scandal of 1942.

During the 1930s, military and ecclesiastical power were increasingly articulated.

In September 1942, a sex and political scandal known as the "cadet scandal" (Spanish: escándalo de los cadetes) or the Ballvé Case (Spanish: Caso Ballvé) broke out in Buenos Aires, regarding the involvement of young cadets from the Colegio Militar de la Nación in alleged sex parties held by gay men of the upper classes.

On June 4, 1943, the GOU—a nationalist secret society within the Argentine Army—staged a coup d'état that ended the Infamous Decade and formed a military junta which ruled the country until 1945. The new authorities intensified the repression of homosexuality, as part of the censorship and control they exercised over radio programs, periodicals and theater. The expulsion of Spanish singer Miguel de Molina was part of this process.

=== 1945–1955: During the Peronist era ===
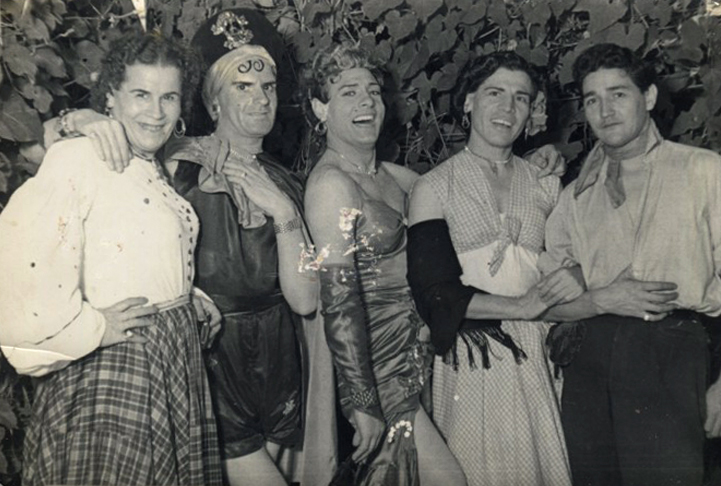
A group of travestis c. 1945, during a private celebration in the outskirts of Buenos Aires, away from the Federal Police.

According to historians Omar Acha and Pablo Ben, the definition of gay men as a singular group was established during the first government of Juan Perón, even though the concept of homosexuality that characterized the time was different from the one that prevails today.

During the Peronist era, the gay men of Buenos Aires mostly lived in apartments in the city center—mostly those who belonged to more well-off social classes—and, above all, in pensions. Unlike the United States—where gay bars existed in the most populous cities already before the 1940s—that possibility did not exist in Buenos Aires until the late 1950s, and private meeting spaces were basically limited to the dwellings.

Peronism maintained an ambiguous relationship with homosexuality: on the one hand, it organized the contraventional regime in 1946 but, on the other hand, it meant a certain relaxation in customs. According to Pablo Gasparini: "Peronism seems to have, however, something of a party. The eroticism that arises from this meeting of classes is powerful. The relationship of the middle-class marica with the chongo from the villa not only filled lamentations but also saunas. Personal testimonies show the existence of gay saunas in Buenos Aires in the 1950s, when there were none in New York."

In 1946, Miguel de Molina returned to Buenos Aires at the request of Eva Perón.

Much has been said about the good relations that Eva Perón had with the gay community. Nevertheless, the testimonies of Paco Jaumandreu—Evita's beloved couturier—paint a different picture:

I learned of the fear of going through a corner where there were two or three boys together, no matter how acquainted they were. I learned about the fear of the screeching scream from the cars. I learned of the fear of the film that was cut and the lights that came on and the screams of the boys from the henhouse—now they call him Pullman. I learned of the disgust of the proposals barely attended in the shadows of the night, I knew of the anger of the high-pitched voice when he saw me pass, of the elbows, of the surplus smiles. But I felt pure. And to respond to a Mataputo phrase by Zully Moreno, he instructs her: “Do you know, my love, that everything you proclaim, that everything you buy in Paris, is invented by people like that? Perfumes and silks, shoes and coats, prints and creams. You see how you need homosexuals and they do not need you ”.

In the late 1940s and 1950s, amid intensified state repression of "amorals" during the first Peronist government, a small clandestine mutual-aid network known as Maricas Unidas Argentinas (MUA) operated in Buenos Aires. Composed of maricas or locas—a social category that historically encompassed both effeminate homosexual men and people who would today be identified as travestis or trans women— the group provided solidarity and material support to those affected by police persecution and imprisonment, particularly in connection with the Devoto prison. Although its existence remained largely unknown for decades and was reconstructed only through later testimonies and press rediscovery, MUA is today regarded by some scholars as possibly the earliest LGBTQ organization in Argentina.

=== 1955–1966: Anti-Peronism and political instability ===
In the 1950s and 1960s, film theatres and public bathrooms were the only possible spaces for gay sociability.

=== 1967–1975: First activist organizations ===
It was during Frondizi's presidency that a large-scale "extermination" of homosexuals was planned for the first time, under the direction of police commissioner Luis Margaride, who also held high police ranks during the later governments of José María Guido (1962–1963), Juan Carlos Onganía (1966–1970) and Perón (1973–1974). A key figure in sex discrimination, Margaride was known derisively in the gay community as "Tía Margarita" (lit. 'Auntie Margarita'), a name that was later extended to the police in general. Margaride's policies reached their largest scale during the de facto rule of Onganía, dismantling gay bars and other homosexual meeting places. He also carried out two major operations; one consisted of closing the subway entrances in a crowded hour to arrest thousands of suspects who prowled the bathrooms and platforms; and the other was a raid carried out in the three classic film theatres of homosexual encounters on Corrientes avenue. Margaride's anti-homosexual campaign was part of a broader "anti-sex" effort, which included the arrest of heterosexual couples for kissing in public and the raiding of motels (colloquially: "telos"), calling the respective spouses when those detained were adulterers. In parallel, prosecutor Guillermo de la Riestra exercised "antisexual terrorism" prosecuting films, plays and books that he considered to be pornographic. In late 1967 trade unionist and communist Héctor Anabitarte founded Nuestro Mundo (lit. 'Our World'), the first gay rights organization in Latin America, anticipating the Stonewall riots by nearly two years. Anabitarte had been part of the Communist Party's youth organization Federación Juvenil Comunista (FJC; English: "Communist Youth Federation"), but was invited to leave in 1967 for being a homosexual. Most of the members of Nuestro Mundo were middle and lower middle class workers, mostly postal employees linked to union movements. In contrast to the more "radical" positions of the gay liberation movement of the following years, the first generation of activists of Nuestro Mundo ascribed, according to Anabitarte, "more to a reformist than to a revolutionary style." The group published a series of bulletins, that were distributed to journalists in mimeographed and fastened sheets, of which the total number of issues is unknown. In August 1971, the Frente de Liberación Homosexual (FLH; English: Homosexual Liberation Front) was created at Pepe Bianco's house in Balvanera, formed by Juan José Sebrelli, Manuel Puig, Blas Matamoro, Juan José Hernández and Héctor Anabitarte. The FLH was initially a coalition of Nuestro Mundo and a group called Profesionales—formed by professional writers—and new organizations joined in the coming years, including the consciousness raising group Alborada, a lesbian group known as Safo, the anarchist Bandera Negra, the radical student collective Eros, and three religious groups of different Christian denominations: Emmanuel, Católicos and Grupo Cristiano.

The FLH was analogous to the gay liberation movement that was taking place in the United States at the time, and its creation was located within an international context of flourishing cultural expressions and political organization of the baby boomer generation, with the rise of the counterculture, the May 68 protests in France, and the anti-Vietnam War movement in the U.S.

Most studies about the FLH have been anecdotal or have concentrated on the magazine Somos, which the group published between December 1973 and January 1976. However, the height of its political activity came before 1973, when the FLH expanded, became publicly visible, and built multiple alliances with other organizations, something that has been overlooked as scholars have focused on discourse analysis of what the FLH published rather than its history of political activity. Throughout its short life, the organization gravitated between leftist Peronism and Marxism and advocated for both to include the homosexual community's claims. During this peak period between 1972 and 1973, the group tried to reach out to other organizations, such as Montoneros.

One of the only public demonstrations of the FLH was during the presidential inauguration of Héctor José Cámpora on May 25, 1973, in the midst of massive celebrations in the Plaza de Mayo. The group—which were no more than fifteen people—carried a banner with a fragment of the Peronist March, which read: "So that love and equality reign in the people" (Spanish: Para que reine en el pueblo el amor y la iguadad).

The alliance with feminist movements such as the Unión Feminista Argentina (UFA; English: Argentine Feminist Union) was crucial in the development of the FLH's sexual politics, and both groups created the Grupo Política Sexual (GPS; English: Sexual Politics Group) in 1972.

Starting in 1973, extreme right-wing terrorist groups began threatening homosexuals.

Since December 1973, the use of homosexuality to discredit radical movements intensified, especially after the FLH was interviewed by Así, after which Buenos Aires was covered with posters associating left-wingers with homosexuality and drug addiction. In 1975 the right-wing publication El Caudillo, run by people connected to the government, called for the "eradication" of all homosexuals by either confinement or mass murder. The intensity of political repression was such that the FLH found it difficult to operate at the most basic level and thus decided to dissolve, with activists like Anabitarte and Perlongher fleeing the country.

=== 1976–1981: State terrorism during the dictatorship ===
Unlike a good part of the organized experiences of LGBT activism, the Argentine case, which began in the late 1960s, was truncated by the last civic-military dictatorship.

Although the FLH was later seen as a "total failure" (as expressed by Perlongher), the memory around the so-called "sexual disobedience", term used in their magazine Somos, laid the foundations for new organizational attempts in the following decades.

A coup d'état in 1976 overthrew President Isabel Perón and established the last civil-military dictatorship of the country. As part of the United States-backed Operation Condor, it carried out the infamous "Dirty War", a regime of illegal repression, indiscriminate violence, persecutions, systematized torture, forced disappearance of people, manipulation of information and other forms of state terrorism that forever changed Argentine society.

LGBT repression intensified after the declaration of the state of siege in 1975 and, after the 1976 military coup, reached its highest peaks in history, framing itself within a general framework of state terrorism and repression against all political activities.

Activism often denounces that there were at least 400 LGBT people among the desaparecidos and that these crimes are yet to be visible and punished. This iconic number was introduced by Carlos Jáuregui in his 1987 book La homosexualidad en Argentina. He later expanded in NX magazine in 1997:

Our community, like every minority in dictatorial times, was a privileged victim of the regime. The late rabbi Marshal Meyer, a member of the CONADEP (National Commission on the Disappearance of Persons), created during the radical government, stated to me in 1985, that the Commission had detected four hundred homosexuals in its payroll of ten thousand people denounced as missing. They had not disappeared due to this condition, but the treatment received, said the rabbi, had been especially sadistic and violent, like that of the Jewish detainees.

During the time of the dictatorship, the city of Tigre in Buenos Aires Province became a famous place of refuge for LGBT people, since the police did not operate there, but the Naval Prefecture, which did not make arrests.

=== 1982–1991: Flourishing of gay life and activism ===
In May 1981, Carlos Jáuregui attended his first pride parade in Paris, France—held in support of socialist François Mitterrand's presidential election—and later visited New York City, where he came into contact with its vibrant gay culture. Following these experiences, Jáuregui was inspired to fully dedicate himself to activism when he returned to Argentina in 1982. By that time, it was increasingly recognized that military rule would not last much longer following the country's defeat in the Falklands War. Nevertheless, between January 1982 and November 1983 a former member of the FLH and at least 17 other gay men were murdered, and in June 1982 a paramilitary group known as the Comando Cóndor declared its intent to "wipe out" homosexuals. In 1983, after the dictatorship had collapsed and democratic elections were held, lesbian and gay life in Argentina flourished, with the opening of many bars and clubs that took advantage of the liberalization. The alternative magazine El Expreso Imaginario reported that in the presidential elections, "100% of the members of the gay population of Buenos Aires" voted for Raúl Alfonsín, who represented, on the one hand, a "guarantee of tranquility" against Peronism's confrontational discourse and, on the other, a "social democratic nuance" that heralded a change from the oppressive climate of the past. This "Alfonsinist spring" for gay people only lasted a little over six months, as the Minister of the Interior Antonio Tróccoli resumed the raids against homosexuals, whom he referred to as "sick". In the first years of Alfonsín's rule, police raids in nightclubs, arbitrary arrests, persecutions and threats to gays, lesbians and travestis were carried out; partly due to the fragility of the new democratic system against the power of the military and police apparatus during those years. In this manner, the rebirth of activism was due as much to the new freedoms as to the continued repression. Activist Marcelo Suntheim explained in 2011: "Democracy began and we all thought that all guarantees and individual freedoms were automatically restored, but reality taught us that many things from the [dictatorship] remained. Murders of [travestis] were quite frequent ... nothing was ever investigated ... It was enough to look gay while walking down Santa Fe Avenue for the police to stop [you] and apply the famous police edict ... that stated that scandal was not allowed in the streets." In this context, the coordinating committee Coordinadora de Grupos Gays (English: Gay Groups Coordinator) was created in late 1982, whose first antecedent was the Grupo 10 de Septiembre (lit. 'September 10 Group')—named in homage to a massive raid—which brought together autonomous groups from Buenos Aires, such as Oscar Wilde, Venezuela, Dignidad, Contacto, Nosotros, Camino Libre, Vómito de buey, Varones antimachistas, Pluralista, Liberación, the GAG and the CHA. In the 1980s, the LGBT movement formulated strategies that were not so linked to traditional politics, through alliances between feminist, gay and travesti groups, human rights organizations—such as Mothers of the Plaza de Mayo—, countercultural movements and spaces linked to the artistic experimentation. Thus, the political scene of activism was transformed by a process of singularization where new practical and theoretical references were put in place to deal with a set of repressive policies still enforced by the state, mainly the implementation of police edicts and the application of the Ley de Averiguación de Antecedentes (lit. 'Background Check Law'), which had mostly been used to persecute LGBT people. In 1983, the Grupo de Acción Gay (GAG; English: "Gay Action Group") was created, formed by artists, university students, academic as well as gay activists from the 1970s, among them Jorge Gumier Maier, Carlos R. Luis, Oscar Gómez, Marcelo Pombo, Facundo Montenegro, Gustavo Gelmi, Jorge Alessandria and Alejandro Kantemiroff. One of the references incorporated by the GAG was the international gay liberation movement, which gained greater notoriety with the media impact of the HIV/AIDS pandemic by renewing its agenda to fight for new legal and medical policies. In February 1984, a police raid took place in a gay club in Balvanera, where around two hundred people were arrested. The event inspired the organization of an assembly to coordinate a local gay movement, which took place in José Luis Delfino's nightclub Contramano. On April 19, 1984, the Comunidad Homosexual Argentina (CHA; English: Argentine Homosexual Community) was founded and Jáuregui was elected as its first president. Unlike the other groups, by the end of the 1980s the CHA consolidated itself as the organization with the greatest symbolic, political and institutional weight, counting on a consensus and a majority degree of representation for the homosexual community. The CHA had two very specific initial demands: the repeal of the police edicts and the Ley de Averiguación de Antecedentes. In addition, one its most important initial objectives was to make homosexuality visible in Argentine society.

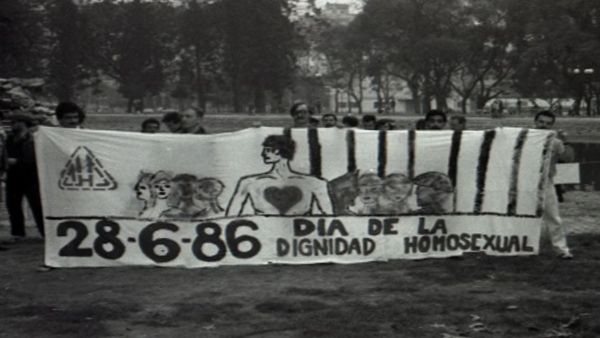
The so-called "Homosexual Dignity Day" manifestation on June 28, 1986, the first gay rights demonstration in the country since the return of democracy.

In April 1984, Jáuregui and fellow CHA activist Raúl Soria appeared on the cover of magazine Siete Días under the title "The risk of being homosexual in Argentina", in what is considered the first public exhibition of two men lovingly embracing each other and a landmark in gay visibility in the country. The entry of homosexuals into the public arena had the effect of the progressive transfiguration of the stereotype, and the effeminacy of the maricas came to be seen as an inconvenience to negotiate integration into society. In contrast, the GAG reclaimed the figure of the marica, which caused tensions with the CHA. The 1980s saw the emergence of new ways of relating and identifying as gay in Buenos Aires and, although the marica model was still in circulation, a rugged and masculine Tom of Finland-like look became popular, in keeping with trends in international gay culture.

On June 30, 1986, activists gathered in Parque Centenario, Buenos Aires, in commemoration of the Stonewall riots. They called it the "International Homosexual Dignity Day" and it became the first demonstration of homosexuals in the country since the return of democracy. It was attended by the CHA, the GAG, the Alternativa Socialista por la Liberación Sexual—a mixed group that worked within the Movement for Socialism (MAS)—and independent people.

In the 1980s, the Pan-American Highway—which separates the City of Buenos Aires from the Buenos Aires Province's different districts—established itself as the most important area in which travestis worked as prostitutes, and thus became one of the definitive aspects of the travesti identity for Argentine society and media culture. In the second half of the decade, these travestis working in the Pan-American Highway began to be violently attacked and murdered, cases that were not investigated by the police and were recorded as "accidents". The murders were reported by magazines such as Libre, Flash and ¡Esto!, the latter which counted 28 travesti deaths in 1987. A popular hypothesis claimed the existence of a serial killer, although researchers such as Marce Butierrez and Patricio Simonetto challenge this view as an urban legend, pointing out that the murders on the Pan-American Highway had different characteristics depending on the area in which they occurred. The Pan-American Highway deaths triggered the first mobilization of travestis in the democratic era, when around twenty travestis gathered in the Plaza de Mayo on December 21, 1986. A much larger demonstration was organized later, which was attended by travestis from other parts of the country and even Uruguay.

=== 1992–2002: The birth of trans activism and the civil union law ===
The 1990s were marked by increased social visibility and intense work with the gay community, although initially with the protagonism of gay men. Early in the decade, under the presidency of Carlos Menem, Argentine popular movements in general were on the decline, but LGBT groups proliferated. Sexual diversity organisations began to multiply and spread beyond the city of Buenos Aires, and a heterogeneous movement was created that included specific organisations for male gays, trans people, women and travestis involved in prostitution, feminist lesbians and members of co-maternal families, as well as the novel "diversity branches" within most political parties. In 1992, the group Lesbianas a la Vista (lit. 'Lesbians in Sight') was founded, which for the first time put on the agenda the question of lesbian invisibility.

In the early 1990s, queer theory and its resulting activism emerged in the United States and soon reached Argentina. The first developments of queer activism, at least in Buenos Aires, appeared in 1993 with the formation of the student collective Eros in the University of Buenos Aires' School of Philosophy and Philology (Spanish: Facultad de Filosofía y Letras).

On June 28, 1992, the first Buenos Aires pride march took place, organized by activist groups Gays DC, Sigla, Cuadernos de Existencia Lesbiana, Iglesia de la Comunidad Metropolitana, Grupo ISIS, Colectivo Eros and Transdevi.

On April 10 and 11, 1998, the third National Gay, Lesbian, Transvestite, Transsexual and Bisexual (GLTTB) Conference was held at the Psychology University in Cordoba, Argentina. It was organized by the Association Against Homosexual Discrimination (A.Co.D.Ho.) and Like the Iguanas (a lesbian group). There were almost 250 attendees. Later events included the 1st National Transvestite Conference in Buenos Aires on November 1 and the 1st Regional Transvestite Conference in Buenos Aires on December 29. Two Cordoba organizations were created at the GLTTB Conference, Union de Travestis de Cordoba for trans women and Como las Iguanas for lesbian women, and the national AIDS Working Party was created by Colectivo Arco Iris and Grupo Humanidades.

In the second half of the 1990s, the Argentine LGBT movement was reconfigurated in response to the HIV/AIDS pandemic.

=== 2004–2011: The Equal Marriage and Gender Identity laws ===
In the early 2010s, Argentina established itself as a pioneering country in terms of LGBT rights, with the passing of the Equal Marriage Law (Spanish: Ley de Matrimonio Igualitario) in 2010—becoming the tenth country to do so—and the Gender Identity Law (Spanish: Ley de Identidad de Género) in 2012—which allows people to officially change their gender identities without facing barriers such as hormone therapy, surgery, psychiatric diagnosis or judge approval.

=== 2012–2018 ===
Between 2010 and 2012, a judicial strategy was carried out jointly by ATTTA and the Federación Argentina LGBT's (FALGBT; English: "Argentine LGBT Federation") legal team, resulting in a series of judicial appeals that established antecedents in the recognition of travesti and transgender identities. On May 9, 2012, the Argentine National Congress passed the Gender Identity Law (Spanish: Ley de Identidad de Género), which made the country one of the world's most progressive in terms of transgender rights. It allows people to officially change their gender identities without facing barriers such as hormone therapy, surgery, psychiatric diagnosis or judge approval. The law has been celebrated as a great victory for the local LGBT movement. Nevertheless, activist Marlene Wayar soon criticized the law claiming that travestis can only choose to change their legal gender to "female", a disacknowledgement of their perceived identity.

The Archivo de la Memoria Trans, conceived by María Belén Correa and Claudia Pía Baudracco and established by Correa following Baudracco's passing in 2012, has pioneered a globally significant initiative. It has amassed over 25,000 materials to reconstruct the collective memory of Argentina's trans community, inspiring numerous similar projects across Latin America.

Upon assuming presidency on December 10, 2019, Alberto Fernández institutionalized a new Ministry of Women, Genders and Diversity (Spanish: Ministerio de las Mujeres, Género y Diversidad), with the aim of promoting the "integral autonomy of all people, without establishing hierarchies between the different sexual orientations, identities or gender expressions". Minister Elizabeth Gómez Alcorta described it as a "product of the historical fight" of the women's and LGBT movements.

=== 2019–2023 ===
Since the implementation of the Gender Identity Law, there have been efforts by activists in search of the legal recognition of non-binary genders such as travesti. In early 2020, activist Lara Bertolini made news for claiming that her national ID should be legally registered as "travesti femininity" (Spanish: "femineidad travesti"). She initially obtained a favorable ruling from a Buenos Aires judge, which was later rejected by the Chamber of Appeals (Spanish: Cámara de Apelaciones), with its three judges citing the Real Academia Española's official definition of "travesti" as their reasoning.

On June 24, 2021, the Argentine Senate passed the Cupo Laboral Travesti-Trans law (English: "Travesti-Trans Work Quota Law"), which established a 1% quota for trans workers in civil service jobs and outlines that government officials must be trained in recognising discriminatory behaviour. The decree on the country's official gazette read: "Every travesti, transsexual or transgender person has the right to decent and productive employment in equal and satisfactory working conditions and protected against unemployment without discrimination for motives of gender identity or its expression".

On July 21, 2021, Argentina became the first country in Latin America to recognise non-binary gender identities in its national identification cards and passports.

=== 2024–present: Threats from the Milei government ===
Throughout 2024, President Milei and members of his administration have made disparaging comments about LGBTQ issues, including same sex marriage and gender identity.

During layoffs in early 2024, 100 of the 995 people hired under the 2021 quota law were laid off. Activists say that this forced LGBTQ individuals into prostitution

In February 2024, President Milei's government announced it was closing the National Institute Against Discrimination, Xenophobia and Racism (INADI).

In May 2024, a man threw a Molotov cocktail into boarding house in Buenos Aires which killed three lesbian women. 8 others were hospitalised with severe burns.

In January 2025, at the World Economic Forum in Davos, Switzerland, Milei made a speech calling LGBTQ people pedophiles, referring to a case where a gay couple in Georgia plead guilty to sexually abusing their adopted children, and warning of the dangers of the mental virus of "woke ideology", calling it a cancer. He also claimed that 5 year-olds could undergo gender-affirming surgery.It sparked large demonstration in Buenos Aires. Congressman Esteban Paulon filed a criminal complaint against him for stereotyping and encouraging violence.

In February 2025, President Milei modified the Gender Identity Law to explicitly ban gender-affirming care for those under the age of 18. He also published a decree that meant criminals could only attend prisons according to their sex assigned at birth. There are debates about whether these decrees were constitutional.

The 2025 report from the National Observatory on LGBT+ Hate Crimes reported that hate crime was up 70% in the first half of 2025 compared to the first half of 2024. The number which were perpetrated by the security services doubled.

On November 1st 2025, Argentina's 34th annual LGBTQ Pride march took place. Thousands marched from Plaza de Mayo to the National Congress building.

== Bibliography ==
- Bazán, Osvaldo (2010) [1st pub. 2004]. Historia de la homosexualidad en la Argentina (in Spanish) (2nd ed.). Buenos Aires, Argentina: Editorial Marea. ISBN 978-987-1307-35-7.
- Demaría, Gonzalo (February 6, 2020). Cacería (paperback). Colección Andanzas (in Spanish) (1st ed.). Buenos Aires: Editorial Planeta. ISBN 978-950-49-6968-6.
- Fernández, Josefina (2004). Cuerpos desobedientes: travestismo e identidad de género (in Spanish). Buenos Aires: Edhasa. ISBN 950-9009-16-4.
- Mailhe, Alejandra, ed. (2016). Archivos de psiquiatría y criminología (1902–1913): concepciones de la alteridad social y del sujeto femenino (PDF) (in Spanish) (1st ed.). La Plata, Argentina: National University of La Plata. Faculty of Humanities and Education Sciences (FaHCE). ISBN 978-950-34-1430-9.
- Melo, Adrián (2011). Historia de la literatura gay en la argentina: Representaciones sociales de la homosexualidad masculina en la ficción literaria (eBook) (in Spanish). Buenos Aires: Ediciones Lea. ISBN 9789876343510.
- Rapisardi, Flavio; Modarelli, Alejandro (August 2001). Fiestas, baños y exilios: Los gays porteños en la última dictadura (paperback) (in Spanish) (1st ed.). Buenos Aires: Editorial Sudamericana. ISBN 978-9500720922.
- Salessi, Jorge (2000) [1st pub. 1995]. Médicos maleantes y maricas: higiene, criminología y homosexualidad en la construcción de la nación argentina (Buenos Aires, 1871–1914) (in Spanish) (2nd ed.). Buenos Aires, Argentina: Beatriz Viterbo Editora. ISBN 950-845-031-2.
- Sebreli, Juan José (June 1997). "Historia secreta de la homosexualidad en Buenos Aires". Escritos sobre escritos, ciudades bajo ciudades (paperback) (in Spanish) (1st ed.). Buenos Aires: Editorial Sudamericana. pp. 275–370. ISBN 978-950-07-1274-3.
