= Malva Solís =

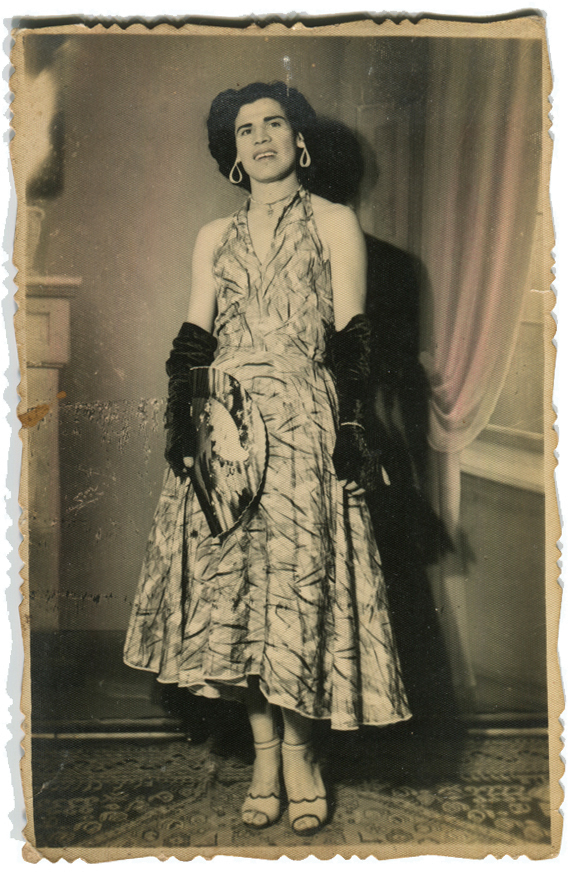
- Solís, circa 1950
- Born: 1919; Chile
- Died: July 2015; Los Polvorines

Malva Solís (1919–2015) was a pioneering Chilean-Argentinian transgender activist, known as "the matriarch of the trans community" in Argentina. She was a founder of the organization Maricas Unidas Argentinas (lit. 'United Argentine Faggots'). Her photographs and papers, held in Archivo de la Memoria Trans de Argentina (Archive of Trans Memory), along with her autobiography, are invaluable sources for Argentina's LGBTQ+ history.

== Biography ==
Solís was born in 1919 in Chile. In January 1943, she famously crossed the Andes on foot, travelling from Chile to Argentina. While she had hoped to find greater freedom in Argentina, Argentina was also a place of repression and persecution. In the 1940s and 1950s, President Perón, with support and pressure from the Catholic Church, targeted the LGBTQ+ community with police raids and arrests.

In c. 1948 or 1951, while in Devoto prison, Solís was one of the founders of Maricas Unidas Argentinas, a solidarity and mutual aid group. Group members — people from the LGBTQ+ community — purchased food and clothing which they brought to imprisoned community members, who were held in conditions of deprivation.

During these years, the LGBTQ+ community would hold parties, where trans women would wear feminine clothing, including glamorous gowns. Solís, who also made costumes for theatrical productions, would often create or alter dresses and costumes for people who attended these parties, including herself. She took many photographs at these and other events, spanning the 1940s–1960s. These photos are now part of the Malva Solís collection in the Archivo de la Memoria Trans, and are the oldest items in the archive.

The Malva Solís collection gives vital insight into Argentina's LGBTQ+ history, by showing the experiences of everyday life and moments of community, celebration, and joy. Thus, the collection acts as a counterpoint to other sources of information from the time period, which usually consist of official documentation such as police and medical reports, from authorities outside of, and usually hostile to, the community. She provided even more material of first-hand lived experience when she wrote her autobiography, Mi recordatorio.

Solís remained an activist and dissident throughout her life.
