= Maricas Unidas Argentinas =

Clandestine queer mutual-aid network in 1940s–50s Argentina

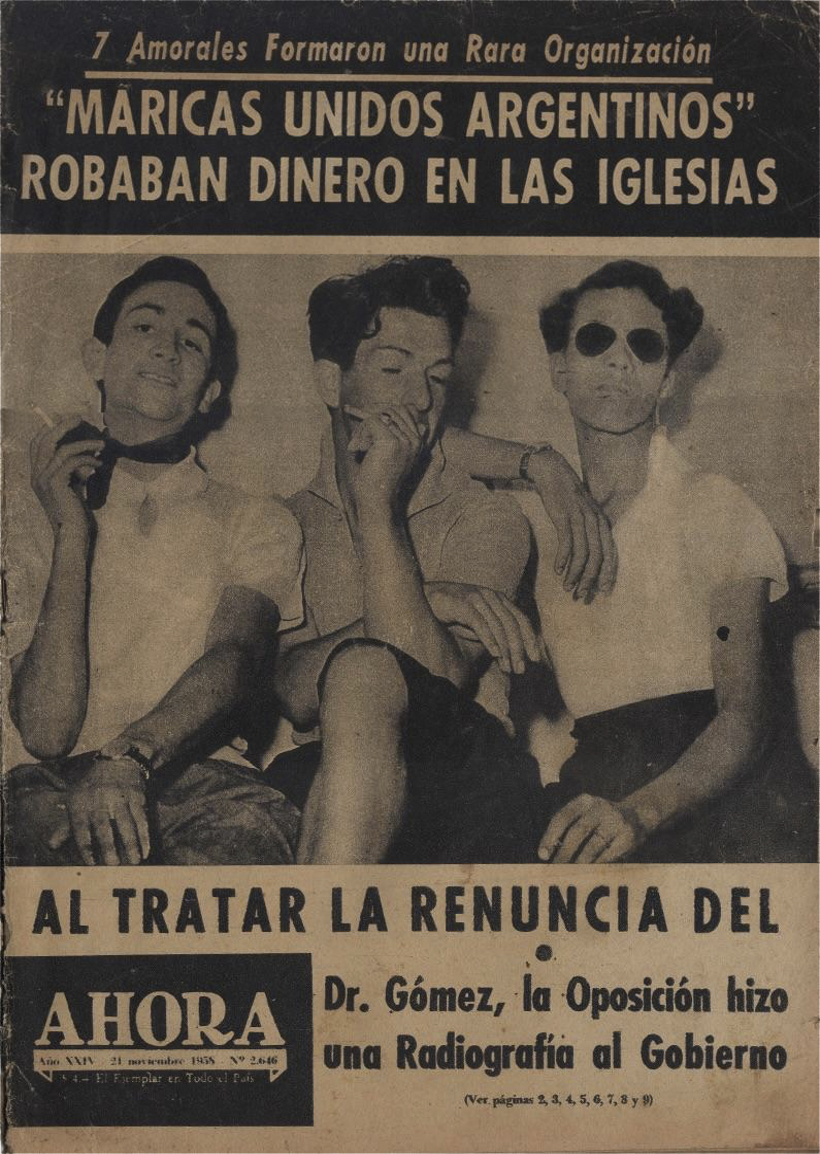
- MUA members on the cover of the sensationalist magazine Ahora, November 1958.
- Abbreviation: MUA
- Formation: c. 1948–1957
- Founded at: Buenos Aires, Argentina
- Type: Clandestine queer mutual aid network

Maricas Unidas Argentinas (MUA; roughly "United Argentine Queers" in English) was a small clandestine mutual aid group formed in Buenos Aires that operated between the late 1940s and the 1950s, in an environment of intensified persecution of LGBTQ people in Argentina. The term marica is a Spanish-language slur comparable to "faggot" or "sissy" in English, and at the time was used by people who today would be read as effeminate gay men and those who would be considered trans women or travestis, before those concepts became widespread. MUA emerged as a mutual support network for those detained in the Devoto prison, where homosexuals (defined as "amorals") were sent in a context of intensified persecution.

Knowledge of MUA first emerged in the 2010s through testimonies by one of its founders, Malva Solís, and its existence was further substantiated in the 2020s with the rediscovery of a feature devoted to the group in the sensationalist magazine Ahora. While Solís places the group's origins around 1948, the Ahora chronicle maintains that it was in 1957. This means that the group predates Nuestro Mundo, often considered the first LGBTQ organization in Latin America, by at least 10 years, and has forced a more complex understanding of the history of the movement. It has since been described as the first documented act of trans activism, and possibly the first LGBTQ organization in Argentina.

== LGBTQ environment in Argentina ==
Before the concepts of travesti, transgender and gay became established and widespread in the second half of the 20th century, Argentine maricas or locas constituted a group situated at the intersection of what is now understood as gender identity and sexual orientation, and included both people who today would be read as effeminate gay men and those who would be considered trans women or travestis.

In the discourse of the Argentine press, the police and the state in the mid 20th century, male homosexuality was framed as a moral and social problem and categorized under the label of "amorals" (Spanish: amorales). Although grounded in earlier repressive practices and discourses, during the government of Juan Domingo Perón the persecution intensified and began to be articulated more explicitly as a state policy, culminating, between late 1954 and early 1955, in large anti-homosexual raids (razzias), conceived as the police expression of a campaign promoted by the Ministry of the Interior, within broader debates on the prophylaxis law, prostitution and public morality.

Repression manifested both in mass arrests and the transfer of detainees to police facilities and to the Devoto prison, as well as in a public staging of punishment through sensationalist press coverage that displayed the detainees. The 1940s and 1950s are remembered in LGBTQ history in Argentina as the time that systematically inaugurated the persecution of gays and travestis, whether or not they engaged in prostitution, leading to prolonged periods of detention. Nevertheless, incarceration also fostered the formation of new community ties among maricas, who were confined in a homosexual ward, where they even developed their own argot, carrilche (which within the slang itself means marica), allowing them to communicate without being understood by the police or by other prisoners.

== Rediscovery of the group ==
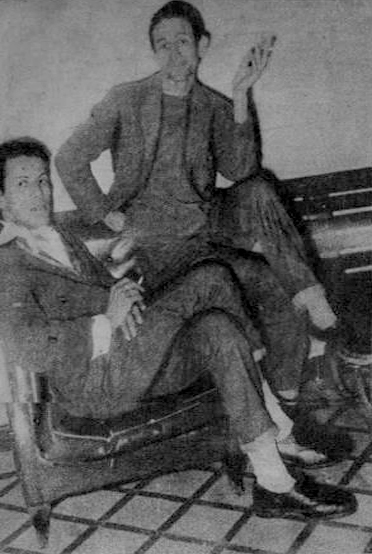
Malva Solís (left), alongside another founder of MUA identified as "Juana de Arco", posing for Ahora magazine after their arrest.

Although short-lived, MUA has been described as the first documented act of trans activism, and may possibly be the first LGBTQ organization in Argentina. Its existence only became known in recent years through the accounts of Malva Solís (1919–2015), considered "the oldest travesti in Argentina", and through her autobiography Mi recordatorio (2010), an interview conducted by researcher María Soledad Cutuli in an article published in 2013, and the documentary Con nombre de Flor (2019), directed by Carina Sama.

In 2022, the first graphic testimony about the group was rediscovered, consisting of a cover story from the sensationalist magazine Ahora dated November 1958, which made it possible for historians—previously skeptical of exclusively oral accounts—to acknowledge its existence and inaugurated an even greater level of complexity in studies on the origins of LGBTQ movements in Argentina. The accounts of Solís and the report in Ahora present several discrepancies, including the date of the group's founding: whereas Solís places it around 1948, the magazine situates it in 1957.

This means that the formation of MUA predates by at least ten years that of the group Nuestro Mundo, often cited as the first organization of the LGBT movement in the history of Argentina and of Latin America as a whole. According to Solís, she and other maricas came together to support one another in the face of street persecution and the experience of incarceration. The organization was fundamentally mutual in character and provided assistance to those detained in prison through emotional support, clothing and food, as well as after their release, when many found themselves evicted from their boarding houses and dismissed from their jobs. By contrast, the sensationalist account in Ahora not only falsifies some of the names and ages of the maricas of MUA, but also accuses them of stealing money from churches in order to squander it on alleged orgiastic parties.

"There was a mariquita we called 'la Copetinera', and one day la Copetinera says, 'girls, what do you think if we form a mutual, each one puts in ten pesos... two pesos...,' because at that time the money was worth a lot... well, with the aim of sending packages to the mariquitas who are in Devoto [prison] and who don't have a soul who comes near them. Poor things, they don't even have cigarettes, they want to eat a piece of bread with cheese and they don't have any. So we gather the money weekly or every two weeks, we buy things and we send them to the ones who are there, and we do that ourselves, since we're lucky enough to be outside. The day we fall, they'll bring things to us. We had a little newsletter, it was a page folded in two, and it said MUA, Maricas Unidas Argentinas, and there people would comment on, for example, the gossip of the moment: 'so-and-so has thirty days in Devoto, or what's-her-name got out and ran into her husband... so-and-so throws a party and invites us...' Gossip, gossip about us. There's never a shortage of some real bastard, and this reaches the ears of Personal Security, which at that time was run by Antonio Di Tomaso, a tough [man], a rabid dog, homophobic, and he orders the big raid. The anger explodes, and they were looking for the mimeograph. And nobody said anything. They capture... they seize the page, we all go for thirty days to Devoto, and we said, 'no girls..., no.... They've cut off our will to live... they've cut off all our freedoms.'"

— Malva Solís, 2015.

== See also ==
- Frente de Liberación Homosexual
- Timeline of LGBTQ history, 20th century
