= Blas Matamoro =

Argentine writer, lawyer, journalist and translator

- Born: January 11, 1942 (age 84); Buenos Aires, Argentina
- Education: University of Buenos Aires
- Occupations: Writer, lawyer

Blas Matamoro (born January 11, 1942) is an Argentine writer, lawyer, journalist and translator.

== Biography ==
Blas Matamoro was born on January 11, 1942, in Buenos Aires, Argentina. He studied law at the Faculty of Law and Social Sciences at the University of Buenos Aires, attaining his degree in 1966. He worked as an education professor and as a lawyer. He was lawyer of political prisoners from the Commission of Families of Political Detainees (Comisión de Familiares de Detenidos Políticos, COFADE).

In 1971, alongside fellow writers Juan José Sebreli, Manuel Puig, Néstor Perlongher, and Héctor Anabitarte, Matamoro co-founded the Frente de Liberación Homosexual (FLH), one of Argentina's first organisations advocating for the rights of LGBT people. Matamoro’s community of advocates faced significant oppositions from the Argentine dictatorship, as their advocacy for queer people went against Christian ideology, to the point that his partners were repeatedly captured and tortured.

The Argentine dictatorship banned by decree his book titled Olimpo for attacking the traditions of the national identity and Christian morality. Olimpo contained a number of messages that were dangerous to the ideology of the dictatorship, particularly the intentional humanization of many famous Argentine figures, such as Hipolito Yrigoyen and Juan Peron. He claimed that they had significant vices and they should be regarded as demons as well as gods, despite their importance to Argentine history and culture. In terms of violation of Christian morality, Matamoro fought the argument that homosexuality occurred as a result of abuse, a lack of a strong father figure, or the idleness of wealth. All of these common misconceptions helped Christianity to pathologize homosexuality, and Matamoro’s book fought to undermine it. In addition, he used a number of sacrilegious images, such as superimposing a pornographic actor over a famous church to use for his cover or comparing gossip to the eucharist. One day after the censorship of Olimpo, Matamoro emigrated to Madrid in 1976 on the advice of his sister.

He was editor of Cuadernos Hispanoamericanos of the Spanish Agency of International Cooperation (Agencia Española de Cooperación Internacional) and collaborated in diverse media as literary and music critic. In 2013, "Tres Rosas Amarillas" published a collection of his short stories under the title of La sonrisa de la Gioconda (Gioconda's Smile).

== Works ==
=== Essay ===
- La ciudad del tango; tango histórico y sociedad (1969)
- Historia del tango (1971)
- Carlos Gardel (1971)
- Jorge Luis Borges o el juego trascendente (1971)
- La casa porteña (1972)
- El teatro Colón (1972)
- Oligarquía y literatura (1975)
- La Argentina del tango, Vol. I (1976)
- La Argentina hoy (1978)
- Contra Borges (1978)
- Saint Exupéry: el principito en los infiernos (1979)
- Saber y literatura: por una epistemología de la crítica literaria (1980)
- La Argentina exiliada (1985)
- Genio y figura de Victoria Ocampo (1986)
- Lope de Aguirre (1987)
- Por el camino de Proust (1988)
- América en la torre de Babel (1998)
- El ballet (1998)
- Jorge Edwards (1998)
- Schumann (2000)
- La etapa mexicana de Luis Cernuda, 1952-1963, with Agustín Sánchez Andrés (2002)
- Rubén Darío (2002)
- Puesto fronterizo. Estudios sobre la novela familiar del escritor (2003)
- Lógica de la dispersión o de un saber melancólico (2007)
- Novela familiar: el universo privado del escritor (2010)
- Cuerpo y poder. Variaciones sobre las imposturas reales (2012)

=== Short story ===
- Hijos de ciego (1973)
- Olimpo (1976), including: ¿Qué es un olímpico?, Olímpicos de ayer y de hoy, Pornografía y moral, La parte del diablo, Caballería tecnológica, Muerte transfiguración, Pesadillas de la razón, Los dioses del estadio, and Confutación/vindicación del mito.
- Viaje prohibido (1978)
- Nieblas (1982)
- Las tres carabelas (1984)

=== Others ===
- Diccionario privado de Jorge Luis Borges (1979)
- Historias del Peronismo (1973)
- Diccionario privado de Jacinto Benavente (1980)
- Diccionario privado de Oscar Wilde (1980)
- Lecturas americanas (1990)
- Lecturas españolas (1994)
