= LGBTQ rights in Argentina =

- Argentine territory in dark green; claimed but uncontrolled territory in light green.
- Legal status: Legal since 1887
- Gender identity: Right to change legal gender since 2012
- Military: LGBT people allowed to serve openly
- Discrimination protections: Sexual orientation protections in Buenos Aires and Rosario (see below)

Family rights
- Recognition of relationships: Civil unions since 2002 in the City of Buenos Aires and nationwide since 2015; Same-sex marriage since 2010
- Adoption: Full adoption rights since 2010

Lesbian, gay, bisexual, transgender, and queer (LGBTQ) rights in Argentina rank among the highest in the world. Upon legalising same-sex marriage on 15 July 2010, Argentina became the first country in Latin America, the second in the Americas, and the tenth in the world to do so. Following Argentina's transition to a democracy in 1983, its laws have become more inclusive and accepting of LGBT people, as has public opinion.

Argentina also "has one of the world's most comprehensive transgender rights laws": its Gender Identity Law, passed in 2012, allows people to change their legal gender without facing barriers such as hormone therapy, surgery or psychiatric diagnosis that labels them as having an abnormality. Because of the law, as well as the creation of alternative schools and the first transgender community centre, BBC Mundo reported in 2014 that "Argentina leads the trans revolution in the world." In 2015, the World Health Organization cited Argentina as an exemplary country for providing transgender rights.

Societal acceptance is also very high. In a 2020 Pew Research Center poll, Argentina was ranked the South American country with the most positive societal attitudes towards homosexuality, with about three-quarters (76%) of those surveyed saying it should be accepted. The country's capital and largest city, Buenos Aires, has become an important recipient of LGBT tourism and has been described as "South America's gay capital". Nevertheless, reports of bullying against LGBT people, especially youth, are still common.

== History ==
=== Pre-colonial times ===
Prior to Spanish colonisation, multiple groups inhabited modern-day Argentina. These include the Mapuche and the Guaraní people, both of whom accepted homosexual relations or viewed them with indifference. Traditionally, the Mapuche recognised a third gender called weye. The Mapuche did not possess the typical Western notions of sex or sexuality. Indeed, weye individuals were regarded as neither male or female, but as some sort of mix between the two. Weye would typically play certain important societal roles, including being a machi, a Mapuche shaman. The Guaraní people are also on record as having accepted homosexuality.

The arrival of the Spanish Empire in the 16th century resulted in the spread of Christianity in Argentina, which in turn introduced negative attitudes towards homosexuality. The Spanish reportedly referenced the indigenous peoples as "savages" for engaging in homosexual activity, and called the Mapuche the "sodomites of Patagonia". Sodomy was apparently one of the reasons the Spanish conquistadors declared war against the local peoples. Following the creation of Spanish governorates in South America, sodomy became punishable with burning at the stake.

=== Independence and early 20th century ===
Same-sex sexual activity has been legal since 1887, when Law No. 1,920 (Spanish: Ley N.° 1920 del 7 de Diciembre de 1886) enacted Argentina's first federal Penal Code. The Penal Code made no reference to consensual sexual acts between adults. However, until recently, several local regulations issued by provincial, municipal and local authorities targeted "homosexualism". LGBT people were heavily persecuted under these regulations.

During the 19th century, writings on homosexuality treated it as a medical pathology, an accusation to be levied against political opponents or something brought into the nation by foreigners. The only public image of homosexuality was urban prostitution and public locations used for cruising. In 1914, a homosexual-themed play named Los Invertidos was forced to shut down, although medical journals were permitted to discuss homosexuality.

Police harassment of homosexuals is reported to have increased during the first military coup of 1930 which initiated the Infamous Decade. The cadet scandal of 1942 led to the most violent persecution against gay men in Argentine history, with a series of police raids and defamations that managed to imprison many homosexuals, led others into exile and resulted in two suicides. It led to the enabling of brothels in the vicinity of military barracks in 1944. Reports on the policies during the Peronist terms (1946 to 1955) are vague and contradictory. In 1946, Eva Perón extended her personal protection to Miguel de Molina, and some reports claim that Juan Perón ordered the police and the military not to engage in gay bashings.

=== Dirty War ===
The first LGBT rights organization to be established was Nuestro Mundo in 1967 by Héctor Anabitarte. It represented the homosexual liberation front that sought an alliance with the political left in order to advance civil rights. Driving the creation of Nuestro Mundo was the dictatorship of Juan Carlos Onganía whose regime heavily suppressed and subjugated members of the LGBT community. Although a landmark moment in the LGBT rights movement in Argentina as a whole, the creation of Nuestro Mundo did not usher in an age of reforms nor increased rights for those in the community. Instead, the group generally avoided being politically active and was primarily concerned with bringing awareness to the oppression the LGBT community faced. It especially focused on ending police brutality against homosexuals and called for the end of anti-LGBT laws. Although Nuestro Mundo itself did not have many successes, it inspired the creation of other LGBT groups, such as Safo, a lesbian organization. Nuestro Mundo eventually combined with other activist groups—Safo, El Grupo Profesionales, Emanuel, Alborada, Bandera Negrea, and Eros—to establish the Frente de Liberación Homosexual (FLH) in 1971, which lasted until 1976. The new organization was created only two years after the Stonewall Riots in New York City, an event that galvanized activists in Argentina.

In the five years it existed, FLH aligned itself with feminists, Marxists, and other left-winged groups and was more openly politically active than its predecessors. Although its political goals were similar to those of Western organizations—of which were models for LGBT activism—its methods differed from those in the West. For instance, FLH was less concerned with establishing a consolidated democracy; instead it was focused on generating freedom and equality via anti-imperialism and "working-class politics", hence the alliances with leftist organizations that were not necessarily involved primarily in LGBT activism.

The 1976 coup and the beginning of a new dictatorship eradicated this movement. Twice, LGBT activists and community members were directly attacked by the regime. In preparation for the 1978 World Cup, which was being held in Argentina, the military—and possibly local police as well—underwent a "cleansing" process in which they arrested, beat, and violently suppressed members of the LGBT community. A second cleansing initiated by the paramilitary organization Comando Cóndor took place from January 1982 to January 1983. During this period, 18 gay men—including an FLH activist—were murdered. In 2023, numerous trans women survivors of imprisonment at a regime blacksite, testified in court about the experience of being hunted by the state, and, once imprisoned, forced to perform sexual acts in exchange for food.

=== Contemporary times ===
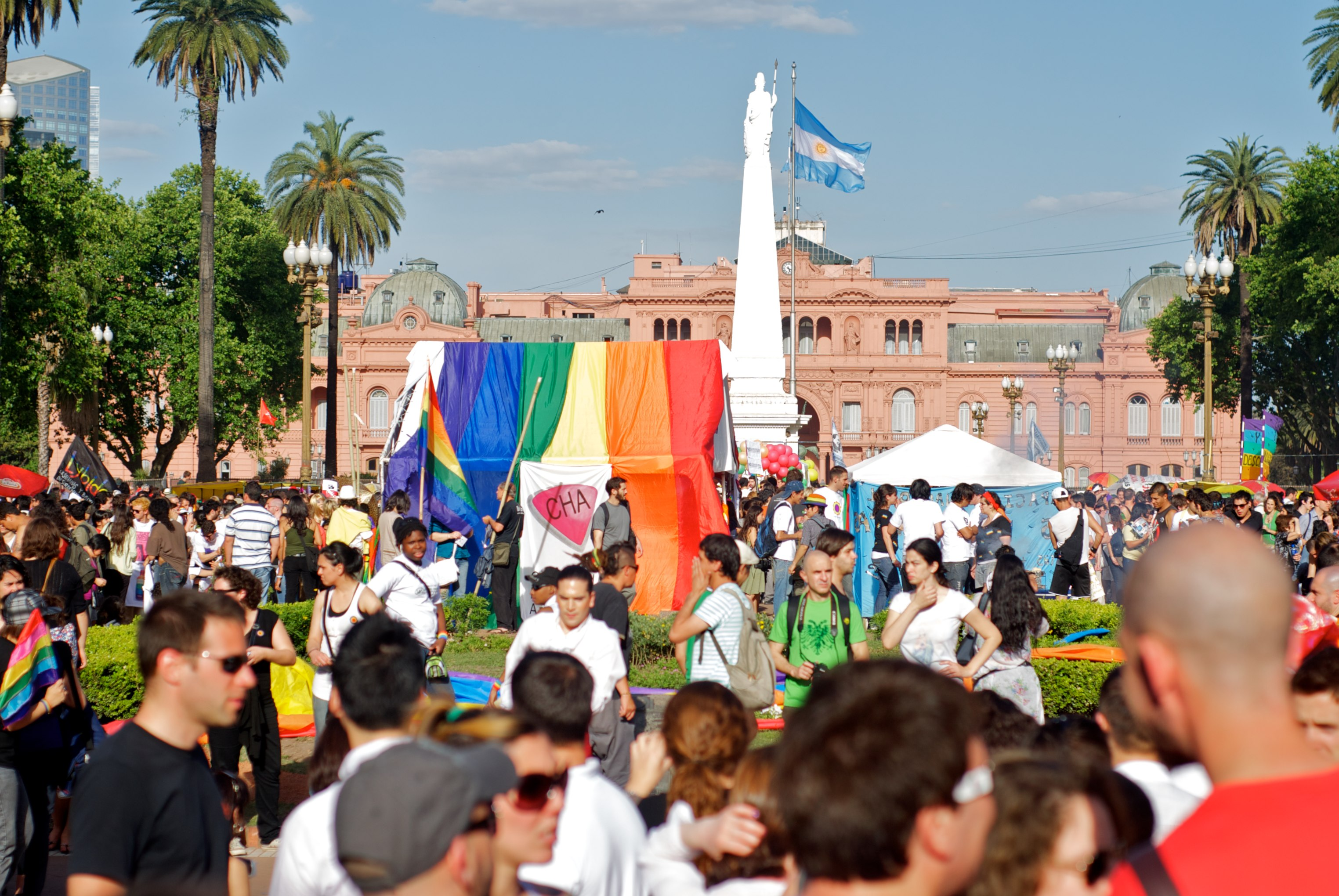
Plaza de Mayo during Buenos Aires' pride parade in 2010

The return to democracy in 1983 allowed for the creation of an LGBT rights movement. During this initial era of democratization, the first gay bar in Argentina opened in Buenos Aires in 1983 and the LGBT community began to become more open, with pride festivals, publications and political activism. Out of this came the founding of the Comunidad Homosexual Argentina (CHA) in April 1984, by among others Carlos Jáuregui. The organization maintained its strength and uniformity through the 1980s, before beginning to splinter in the 1990s. Groups of all kinds began to form out of CHA, such as the Convocatoria Lesbiana, Sociedad de Integración Gay-Lésbica Argentina, and Transexuales por el Derecho a la Vida y la Identidad. As these groups and many others became increasingly political and wanted institutional, legal change, they eventually came to a consensus in 2006: they needed to band together to create one uniform organization that would allow them to effectively create change. Thus came about the Federación Argentina de Lesbianas, Gays, Bisexuales y Trans (FALGBT).

Although influenced by CHA, FALGBT was different: it was particularly focused on legalizing same-sex marriage; it is considered an "umbrella organization", and therefore is less centralized; and is more concerned with issues outside of rights for gay men, such as rights for gay women and feminism. Furthermore, it was less concerned with conforming to heteronormative ideas of gender and sexuality than CHA—openly endorsing and supporting transgender people and others who challenge the gender binary. FALGBT went so far as to rival CHA's attempts at legalizing civil unions for same-sex couples to instead demand full, legal marriages. FALGBT was heavily influenced by Spain, especially after Spain—a Catholic country like Argentina—legalized same-sex marriage. Spain's Federación Estatal de Lesbianas, Gays, Transexuales y Bisexuales (FELGTB) is considered to be the model for the organisation. These reasons are why CHA is still a separate entity from FALGBT. Since the legalization of same-sex marriage in 2010, FALGBT has continued to advocate for rights and representation of LGBT people in Argentina. Its other successes include: passing the Gender Identity Law in 2012, which allows people to legally change gender without permission from medical or healthcare providers and also ensures non-binary, transgender, or gender non-conforming individuals get equal access to healthcare; the repealing of the Fault Codes, a collection of laws that "criminalized sex diversity"; getting pro-LGBT sex education to be taught in schools; passing laws that protect LGBT students from bullying and other forms of harassment; and lastly passing a law allowing for LGBT families to use reproductive technology such as in vitro fertilization without discrimination.

After both the creation of FALGBT and the legalization of same-sex marriage, there has been more visibility for LGBT people in Argentina. For instance, in 2007, the International Gay World Cup was held in Buenos Aires, with the Argentinian team winning. In recent years, there has also been an effort to encourage LGBT tourists to visit Buenos Aires, with the hope that the increased tourism will help the economy.

Despite these advances, there are still instances of what could be considered anti-LGBT sentiments in the Argentine government and judicial system. In 2015, a judge reduced the sentence of a man convicted of raping a six-year-old boy, on the basis that the young child had a "homosexual orientation". Agence France-Presse reported that Aníbal Fernández called for the impeachment of the judges that made that decision, describing it as "one of the biggest disgraces we've ever seen in this country". In 2024, following the deaths of three lesbians in the Buenos Aires firebomb attack, there was controversy when the judiciary initially declined to consider hate crime charges; it reversed its decision following the intervention of human rights groups.

== Recognition of same-sex relationships ==
=== Background ===
In 2005, following the institution of civil unions in the province Río Negro and the city of Buenos Aires, a judge ordered prison authorities in the Córdoba Province to allow conjugal visits between gay prisoners and their partners. The laws approving civil unions for same-sex couples in both the city of Buenos Aires and the Río Negro Province were endorsed in 2002 and 2003, respectively, and in the town of Villa Carlos Paz in 2007. In 2009, the city of Río Cuarto also began allowing civil unions. These unions provided many of the same rights and privileges as that of married couples, however, adoption of children were not included among them. "Coexistence unions" (Spanish: unión convivencial) were eventually made legal nationwide on 1 August 2015 after the Código Civil y Commercial, which replaced the former Civil Code, came into effect.

An early 2007 poll showed that 75% of those surveyed in the city of Buenos Aires believed that gays and lesbians should be allowed to marry, whereas 66% of Argentines supported same-sex marriage in 2009, if consideration was given to the whole country.

=== 2009 court ruling ===
In November 2009, a judge ruled that the prohibition of same-sex marriage was unconstitutional and permitted a male couple, Alex Freyre and Jose Maria Di Bello, to be married. The decision was hailed as a "legal first" by Reuters who said it was "setting a precedent that could pave the way for the Catholic country to become the first in Latin America to allow same-sex marriage". Freyre and Di Bello confirmed they were "the first same-sex couple in Latin America to get the right to marry". The Chief of Government of the Autonomous City of Buenos Aires, Mauricio Macri, confirmed he would not be appealing the decision. Macri said that the decision was "an important step, because we must learn how to live in freedom without hurting the rights of others", later adding that "we must cohabit, and accept this reality. The world is heading toward that direction". The wedding was finally suspended after another judge revoked the original decision in late November 2009. Finally, on 28 December 2009, the couple got married in Ushuaia, Tierra del Fuego Province, becoming the first same-sex married couple in Latin America. They were supported by the Governor of Tierra del Fuego, Fabiana Ríos, who signed a decree approving the wedding based in the judicial rule of November 2009. Because that decision applied only in the case presented by Freyre and Di Bello, other same-sex couples had to appeal to the Judicial Power, wait for the resolution of unconstitutionality and then go to Tierra del Fuego to marry.

=== Same-sex marriage legalization ===
The first pro-marriage bill championed by the FALGBT was introduced in 2007, and although it failed, it brought the issue of same-sex marriage to the public's attention and allowed for two other bills to be introduced in 2009.

Same-sex marriage was legalized in Argentina on 15 July 2010, after a positive vote in both the Chamber of Deputies (lower house) and the Senate (upper house). Same-sex couples are thus eligible for the same benefits and protections as opposite-sex couples (including adoption). Some cities also have civil union laws that continue to be in place as an alternative to marriage, but offer more limited rights. After the law was passed, Argentina became the second country in the Americas to legalise same-sex marriage, as well as the first in Latin America, and the tenth worldwide, following Belgium, Canada, Iceland, the Netherlands, Norway, Portugal, South Africa, Spain and Sweden.

Leading up to the legalization of same-sex marriage, the Catholic Church in Argentina worked endlessly against same-sex marriage. However, unlike in other Latin American countries—where the Church may have been more successful—Argentina is a relatively secular society. Church attendance rates are among the lowest in Latin America (only 22% of the population regularly attended church in 2014) making it less likely that Argentinians are directly influenced by the Church on certain issues such as same-sex marriage.

== Adoption and parenting ==
Same-sex couples have been able to legally adopt since July 2010, when the same-sex marriage legislation went into effect.

Since 2013, lesbian couples have had equal access to IVF. A law allowing such procedures was approved by the House of Deputies 204 votes to 1 with 10 abstentions in June 2013.

Article 562 on "Procreative will" of the Civil and Commercial Code establishes the following: "Those born through assisted human reproduction techniques are children of the person who gave birth and of the man or woman who has also given their prior, informed and free consent in the terms of articles 560 and 561, duly registered in the Civil Registry and Capacity of Persons, regardless of who provided the gametes."

In 2024, the Supreme Court of Justice ruled for the first time on a case involving surrogacy. It rejected the claim of a gay couple who had a child through a surrogate and demanded that a new birth certificate be made in which the woman was not listed. The judges held that it was not possible based on the Civil and Commercial Code.

== Discrimination protections ==
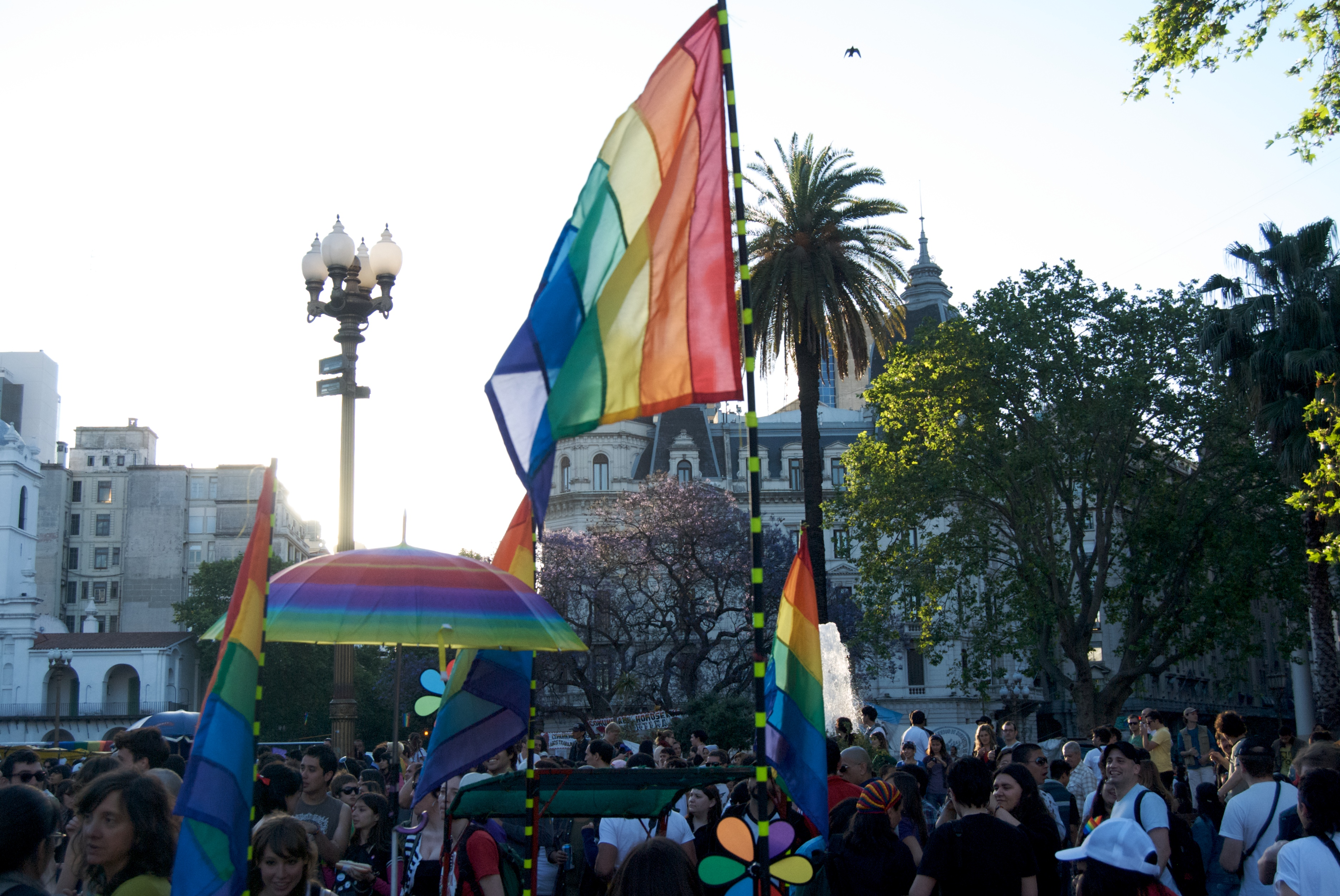
A rainbow flag at the 2009 Buenos Aires Pride parade

Since February 2024, the anti-discrimination agency was abolished and shutdown by the government of Argentina, along with many other agencies in order to reduce public spending.

As of 2019, no national law exists to expressly deal with discrimination or harassment on the basis of sexual orientation or gender identity, although the Autonomous City of Buenos Aires and the city of Rosario (the third most populous of the country) do include sexual orientation in their civil rights and anti-discrimination laws. On 13 August 2010, the Chamber of Deputies approved an amendment to the anti-discrimination law banning discrimination based on sexual orientation and gender identity, but it was not voted by the Senate. A new proposal was introduced in May 2013.

On 27 March 2015, a comprehensive federal anti-discrimination law was introduced to the National Congress by a leading LGBT rights group and several members of Congress. The bill's first debate in a commission was on 29 April, but it was later stalled. A new bill was introduced in the Senate in June 2016.

Discrimination against employees of the National Public Administration (Spanish: Administración Pública Nacional) on the basis of their sexual orientation has been illegal since 2006.

=== Hate crime law ===
In 2012, the Penal Code was amended to provide a penalty of up to life imprisonment for hate crimes based on sexual orientation, gender identity or expression.

Article 80(4) of the Penal Code (Delitos contra las personas, "Crime against individuals") states that life imprisonment shall be imposed to anyone who kills for pleasure, greed and hatred based on racial, religious reasons, gender, sexual orientation, gender identity or expression.

== Gender identity and expression ==
Discrimination and harassment on the account of gender identity remain a problem, although the transgender community has become more visible and politically organized.

In 1997, the Asociación de Lucha por la Identidad Travesti-Transsexual was created to defend the rights of transgender people. One of its first victories came in 2006 when the Supreme Court overturned a lower court's ruling that had stated that transgender people did not have a legal right to organize and campaign for their rights.

In 2007, the Supreme Court ruled that a 17-year-old had the legal right to go through the sex change process and have her legal documents changed to reflect the operation.

In 2009, Marcela Romero won the legal right to have her identity changed, and was given an honorary title by the government. She was awarded by the Honorable Congresswoman of the year. Romero remains one of the leading advocates for the human rights of transgender people in Argentina.

In 2012, the Senate unanimously approved the Gender Identity Law (Spanish: Ley de Identidad de Género). This law grants adults sex reassignment surgery and hormone therapy as a part of their public or private health care plans. The law also allows for changes to gender, image or birth name on civil registries without the approval of a doctor or a judge. In 2013, a six-year-old girl named Luana, who was designated male at birth, became the first transgender child in Argentina to have her new name officially changed on her identity documents. She is believed to be the youngest to benefit from the country's Gender Identity Law.

Mendoza Province and Santa Fe Province were the first jurisdictions in the country to allow individuals to leave their sex entry blank instead of choosing "male" or "female". On 20 July 2021, President Alberto Fernández signed a Necessity and Urgency Decree (Decreto 476/2021) mandating the National Registry of Persons (RENAPER) to allow a third gender option on all national identity cards and passports, marked as an "X". The measure applies to non-citizen permanent residents who possess Argentine identity cards as well. In compliance with the Gender Identity Law, this made Argentina one of the few countries in the world to legally recognize non-binary gender on all official documentation.

In February 2025, President Javier Milei's government implemented a ban on gender affirming care under the age of 18, as part of Milei's war on "woke ideology". In April 2025, a Federal Court ruled that the ban was unconstitutional, restoring access to care for minors nationwide.

== Military service ==
On 27 February 2009, Argentina's Parliament passed a broad military reform act. One of the provisions of the law allows gay, lesbians and bisexuals to serve in the military and bans discrimination on the basis of sexual orientation within the armed forces. The law became effective six months after passage.

== Blood donation ==
In September 2015, Argentina abolished its ban on gay and bisexual men donating blood.

== Conversion therapy ==
Since 2010, no diagnosis can be made in the field of mental health on the exclusive basis of "sexual choice or identity".

== HIV/AIDS and sex education ==
Comprehensive sexual education has traditionally been and still somewhat remains a taboo topic in Argentine politics. As such, it has been difficult to implement a preventative campaign that will target youth due to religious objections from clergy, parents and local officials. Likewise, while health care is the right of each citizen, it is often elusive for people living in rural communities. Much of the funding for public education and treatment has come from private charities, NGOs and international organizations.

Argentina enacted a sex education law in 2006, though it has been criticised for not doing enough to prevent bullying of LGBT youth. In 2017, the Government launched a digital platform that informs young people of a variety of topics "in a fun, friendly and visual way". The platform touches on topics, such as gender-based violence, LGBT rights, contraception, eating disorders and drugs.

Argentina enacted an HIV/AIDS law in 1990, the 23.798 HIV/AIDS National Law, which has also been criticised. Critics pointed to its failure to cater to people living with other STDs apart from HIV/AIDS and for this reason, two different projects were presented in 2016 and 2018 with the aim of modifying the existing 1990 law.

In Article 1, the 23.798 HIV/AIDS National Law declares a national interest in the fight against Acquired Immune Deficiency Syndrome (AIDS), which involves the detection and investigation of its causal agents, the diagnosis and treatment of the disease, its prevention, assistance and rehabilitation, as well as measures taken to prevent its propagation. Moreover, it establishes the National Ministry of Health and Social Action as the national body which will be in charge of enforcing the law. Also, it states that the respective sanitary authorities of each jurisdiction will be in charge of the implementation of the law. Further, the law states that it is compulsory to detect HIV and its antibodies present in the human blood destined for blood transfusions and plasma. It also makes it compulsory to test donors whose organs will be transplanted and discard the blood samples and organs for transplantation that show positivity for HIV.

Towards the end of the year 2015, the National Ministry of Health, together with representatives of 35 organizations of civil society, including scientific institutions, organizations working in the field and people living with HIV, finished their long-term project through introduce modifications to the 1990 law, and created the HIV/AIDS law project (E6139-D-16), which they presented to Congress in 2016.

According to this project, the law should be modified to declare a national interest not only in the fight against, prevention, diagnoses, investigation, control and integral treatment for AIDS, but also for hepatitis and other sexually transmitted diseases. The project also aims to end the discrimination against and stigmatization of people living with these diseases. In addition, it declares of national interest the medicines, vaccines and products for the treatment of HIV, hepatitis and other sexually transmitted diseases, as well as the investigation and the development of local technologies for the national public production of such supplies which guarantee the sustainability of public policies and the defense of the national sanitary sovereignty.

The project also involved the creation of the National Commission of HIV, Hepatitis and STD, composed of representatives of state agencies, Argentine citizens from organizations of people living with HIV and STDs, and scientific institutions, among others. Further, the project promotes both the setting up of a special fund aimed at strengthening organizations of people living with HIV and hepatitis, whose purpose would be to guarantee the observance of the new law, and the creation of a national body concerned with stigma and discrimination associated with HIV, hepatitis and STDs with the purpose of making the issues visible and combating the violation of human rights that people living with HIV and AIDS suffer.

Other important innovations included in the 2016 project are making it compulsory both the offering of HIV tests diagnoses in every medical visit and the detection not only of the Human Immunodeficiency Virus (HIV), but also of hepatitis and other STD, and their antibodies present in the human blood that will be eventually used for blood or plasma transfusions. Regarding what the 1990s law stated about the investigation of donors whose organs will be transplanted, this new project holds the same view while also including the previously mentioned diseases.

When it comes to HIV and AIDS in the fields of work and education, the 2016 project aims to advance the protection of the rights of workers and students who may face discrimination and hostility regarding their HIV/AIDS status by, for example, forbidding companies and schools to require workers and students to disclose their HIV status as a prerequisite for admission.

The 2016 law project was presented twice in 2016 and 2017. In 2016 it was successfully approved in the Health Commission but it eventually failed to become a law. The following year, it was presented again but Congress gave priority to the discussion of the Argentine Labour Reform, and so the treatment of the project was delayed.

In 2018, two years after the 2016 law project was presented to Congress, a new project (3550-D-2018) was taken to Congress with aims similar to those of the previous one. This represented a second attempt at updating the 1990 HIV/AIDS National Law, and it did not succeed either. Furthermore, the 2018 Law project was rejected again in the year 2019.

=== Gender-neutral language ===
In June 2022, Buenos Aires implemented a policy that forbade public educational institutions from using gender-neutral language on the basis that gender-neutral language is grammatically incorrect and causes developmental learning issues for students. In the Spanish language nouns are either feminine (usually ending in "a") or masculine (usually ending in "o"), but in recent years gender-neutral endings like "x" and "e" have gained popularity; for example, "Latinx" or "Latine" have become the gender-neutral options for the previously binary "Latino" or "Latina." Buenos Aires' objection to gender-neutral language in the classroom stems from concerns about linguistic correctness and preservation of the Spanish language. Those who support the development of gender-neutral language have expressed frustration with the male-dominance of the Spanish language: a group of students who are all female is "compañeras," but if one male student enters the group, the grammatically correct term for the students becomes "compañeros" with the masculine "o" ending.

== Living conditions ==
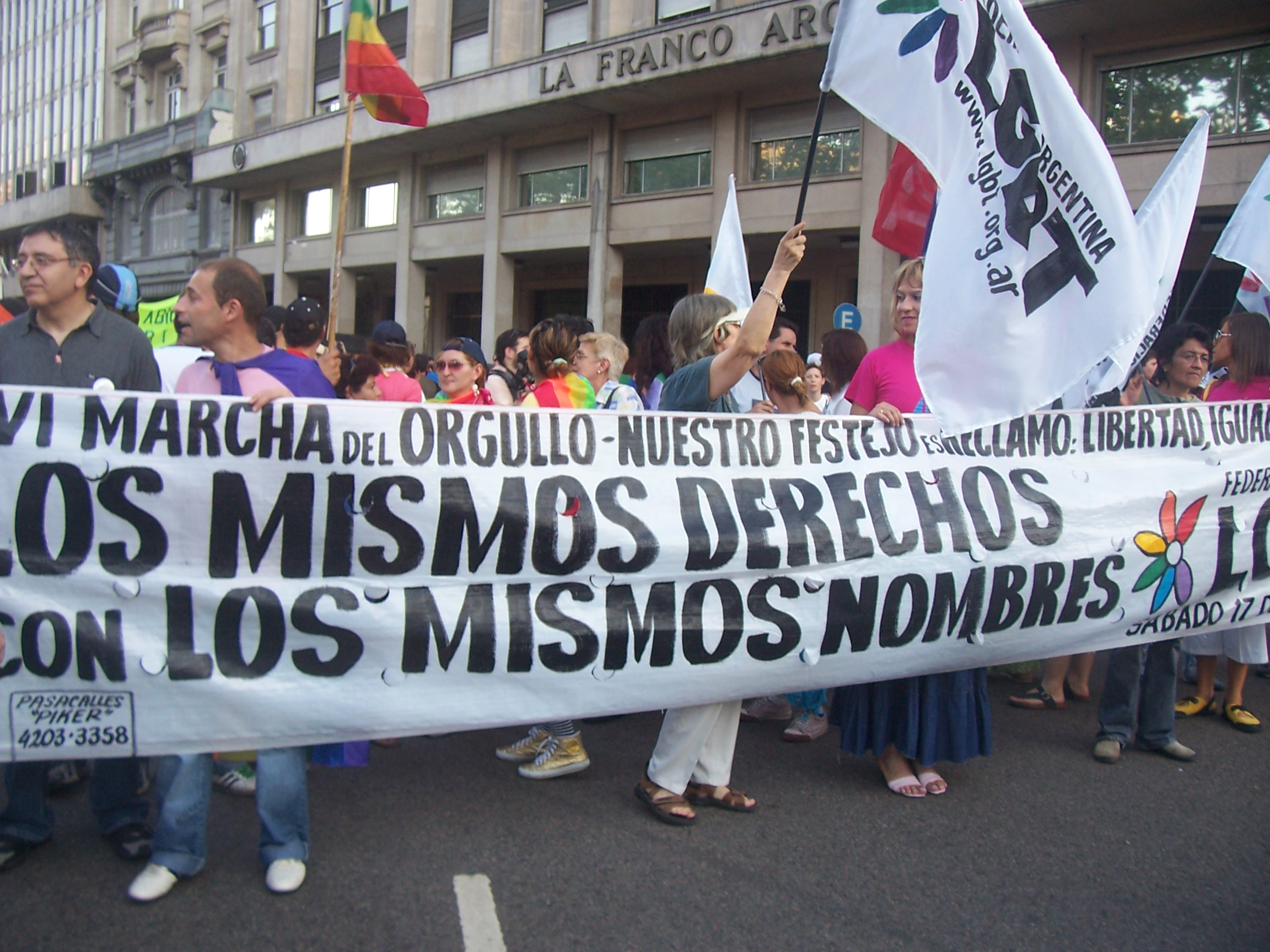
Gay Pride parade in Buenos Aires (2007)

Since the end of the dictatorship in 1983 and the subsequent transition to a free democracy, Argentina has seen a significant shift in public attitudes towards LGBT people. During the dictatorship, LGBT people were actively persecuted; many were murdered, beaten, raped or disappeared. Homosexuality, transgender people and same-sex relationships were viewed as "disordered", "decadent" and "sub-human" by society, the military regime and the Catholic Church. In the decades following the dictatorship, Argentina has made "big strides" in recognising the legal rights of LGBT people. Multiple LGBT organisations were formed in the late 1980s and early 1990s, campaigning for the rights of LGBT people and raising public awareness of their cause. In 2010, the country became the tenth worldwide to legalise same-sex marriage, despite opposition from the influential Catholic Church. Other legal reforms include enacting a hate crime law to cover sexual orientation and gender identity, the legalisation of civil unions, allowing same-sex couples to adopt, allowing gay and bisexual men to donate blood, banning conversion therapy, and the passage of a transgender recognition law, which led the BBC Mundo to state that "Argentina leads the trans revolution in the world." Societal attitudes have also evolved significantly, going from public hostility and antipathy to acceptance and tolerance. A 2013 poll showed that 74% of Argentinians believed homosexuality should be accepted by society. This number was 81% among younger respondents. According to a 2009 survey, two-thirds of Argentinians were in favour of same-sex marriage. This increase in societal acceptance has led and encouraged members of the LGBT community to enter the public eye and come out.

Argentina is frequently referred to as one of the most LGBT-friendly South American countries. There is a visible LGBT scene in Buenos Aires, the capital, with many gay bars, nightclubs, cafés, restaurants and other venues and events. Nickname "South America's gay capital", Buenos Aires has become an important recipient of LGBT tourism. Due to same-sex marriage bans there, many couples from neighbouring come to Buenos Aires to marry, as Argentina does not have any residency requirements for marriage. Outside Buenos Aires, there are visible LGBT scenes in Córdoba, Rosario, Mendoza, Puerto Madryn, Ushuaia, and Mar del Plata.

In May 2015, PlanetRomeo, an LGBT social network, ranked Argentina as the second happiest South American country for gay men, after Uruguay.

=== Pride parades ===
Buenos Aires Pride (Marcha del Orgullo LGBT de Buenos Aires) is an annual pride parade held in the city. First held in 1992, it was attended by about 300 participants, and since then has been growing each year. In 2018, an estimated 100,000 people took part in the festivities. Other cities including Córdoba and Mendoza have held pride parades since 2008 and 2011, respectively; both with good attendance.

=== Public opinion ===
A 2020 Pew Center Research opinion poll ranked Argentina the most positive South American country in regards to societal attitudes towards homosexuality, with about three-quarters (76%) of those surveyed saying it should be accepted. The acceptance is further higher among young people (82%). A majority of Argentinians support the legality of same-sex marriage.

== Summary table ==
Right	Legal status
Same-sex sexual activity legal	Since 1887
Equal age of consent (13)	Yes
Anti-discrimination laws	Only in Rosario, and Buenos Aires; pending nationwide
Hate crime law includes sexual orientation and gender identity	Since 2012, through an aggravating circumstance
Same-sex marriage	Since 2010
Recognition of same-sex couples (e.g. unregistered cohabitation, life partnership)	Starting in Buenos Aires in 2002
Stepchild adoption by same-sex couples	Since 2010
Joint adoption by same-sex couples	Since 2010
Recognition of adoption for single people regardless of sexual orientation	Since 1871
Lesbians, gays and bisexuals allowed to openly serve in the military	Since 2009
Transgender allowed to openly serve in the military	Yes
Right to change legal gender	Since 2012
Third gender option	Since 2021
Parental leave for same-sex couples after adoption	No parental leave after adoption, but can be granted by judges and collective bargaining agreements
Parental leave for lesbian couples after birth	90 days for the mother and 2 days for the partner, collective bargaining agreements can give more days
Access to IVF for lesbians	Since 2013
Conversion therapy banned	Since 2010, only medical ban.
Commercial surrogacy for gay male couples	Not regulated
MSMs allowed to donate blood	Since 2015

== See also ==
- Human rights in Argentina
- National Institute Against Discrimination, Xenophobia and Racism
- Ministry of Women, Genders and Diversity
- Same-sex marriage in Argentina
- LGBT rights in the Americas
- Transgender rights in Argentina
- Intersex rights in Argentina
- LGBT culture in Argentina
