= Néstor Osvaldo Perlongher =

Argentine poet and anthropologist

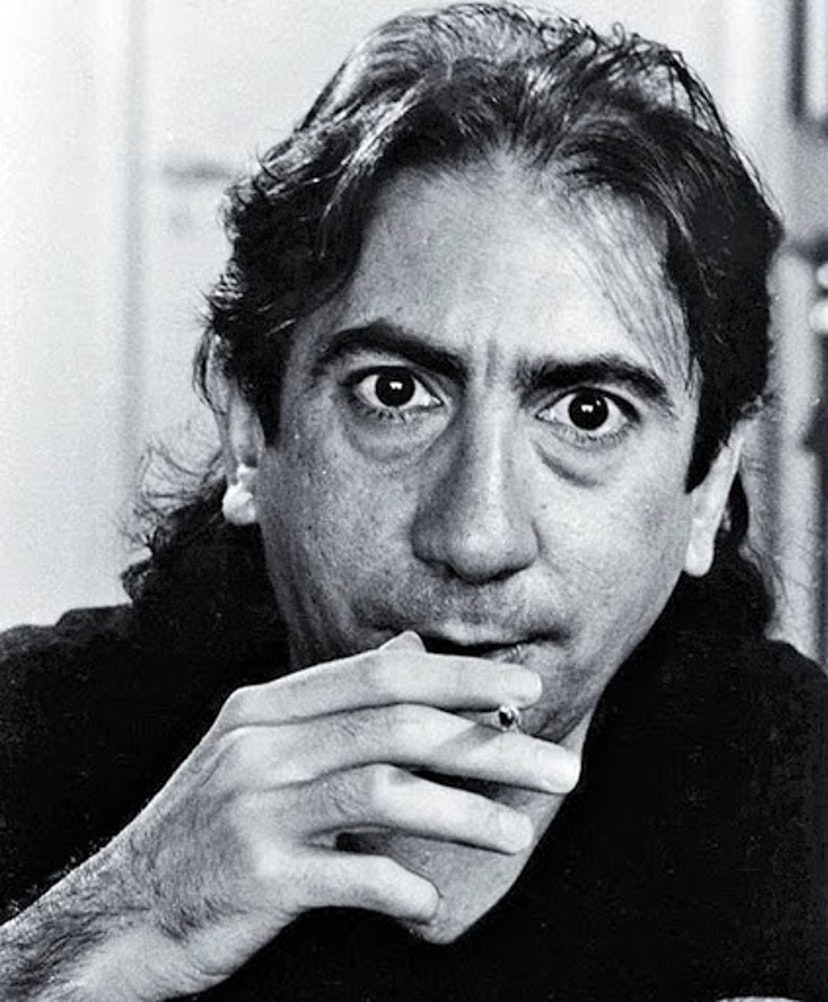
- Néstor Perlongher in 1988.
- Born: December 25, 1949; Avellaneda, Argentina
- Died: November 26, 1992 (aged 42); São Paulo, Brazil
- Occupation: Poet
- Writing career
- Period: 1967–1992
- Genres: Poetry, essay and short story

Néstor Osvaldo Perlongher (Avellaneda, 25 December 1949 – São Paulo, 26 November 1992) was an Argentine poet and anthropologist.

He graduated and completed his degree in sociology; he moved to São Paulo, where he graduated from the University of Campinas with a Master of Social Anthropology; where he was appointed professor in 1985.

His work appeared in the El Porteño, Alfonsina, Last Kingdom and Poetry Journal. He was active in the Frente de Liberación Homosexual. He died of AIDS in São Paulo.

== Awards ==
- 1993 Guggenheim Fellowship.

== Works ==
- Austria-Hungría (Buenos Aires, Tierra Baldía, 1980).
- Alambres (Buenos Aires, Último Reino, 1987; Premio "Boris Vian" de Literatura Argentina).
- Hule (Buenos Aires, Último Reino, 1989) ISBN 978-950-9418-57-8.
- Parque Lezama (Buenos Aires, Sudamericana, 1990).
- Aguas aéreas (Buenos Aires, Último Reino, 1990).
- El chorreo de las iluminaciones (Caracas, Pequeña Venecia, 1992).
- Poemas completos: 1980-1992, Buenos Aires: Planeta, 1997; Grupo Editorial Planeta S.A.I.C./Seix Barral, 2003, ISBN 978-950-731-366-0.

=== Non-fiction ===
- Prosa plebeya, Editors Christian Ferrer, Osvaldo Baigorria, Ediciones Colihue SRL, 1997, ISBN 978-950-581-191-5.
- Papeles insumisos, Editor Reynaldo Jiménez, Santiago Arcos, 2004, ISBN 978-987-21493-3-8.
- El negocio del deseo: la prostitución masculina en San Pablo, Paidós, 1999, ISBN 978-950-12-3803-7.
- La prostitución masculina, Ediciones de la Urraca, 1993, ISBN 978-950-9265-28-8.
- El Fantasma del SIDA, Puntosur, 1988.

== Sources ==
- Néstor Perlongher: the poetic search for an Argentine marginal voice, Ben Bollig, University of Wales Press, 2008, ISBN 978-0-7083-2123-2.
- Bollig, Ben "Nestor Perlongher and the Avant-Garde: Privileged Interlocuters and Inherited Techniques", Hispanic Review - Volume 73, Number 2, Spring 2005, pp. 157–184.
- The art of transition: Latin American culture and neoliberal crisis, Francine Masiello, Duke University Press, 2001, ISBN 978-0-8223-2818-6.
