= Nuestro Mundo =

First gay rights organization in Latin America

- Successor: Frente de Liberación Homosexual
- Formation: November 1967; 59 years ago
- Founder: Héctor Anabitarte
- Founded at: Buenos Aires, Argentina

Nuestro Mundo (literally "Our World," also Grupo Nuestro Mundo meaning "Our World Group") was a gay rights organization founded by Héctor Anabitarte in Buenos Aires, Argentina in late 1967. In 1971, it joined with several similar organizations to form the Frente de Liberación Homosexual. Nuestro Mundo has often been cited as the first LGBT rights organization in Latin America. However, recent historical research has documented the earlier existence of Maricas Unidas Argentinas (MUA), a small clandestine mutual aid network active in Buenos Aires around the late 1940s and 1950s, which some scholars regard as a possible precursor to later LGBTQ organizing in Argentina.

== Formation ==
Nuestro Mundo was founded by Héctor Anabitarte, a trade unionist. He and the other leaders of the group were expelled from the Communist Party of Argentina for being homosexuals.

When the group was formed in November 1967, Argentina was ruled by the Argentine Revolution a military dictatorship that repressed LGBT people. Nuestro Mundo largely focused on bringing awareness to the oppression of Argentina's LGBT community and ending police brutality against homosexuals rather than engaging in political activity. Anabitarte described the group's demands as "more reformist than revolutionary."

== Frente de Liberación Homosexual ==
In August 1971, Nuestro Mundo merged with several other activist groups to form the Frente de Liberación Homosexual ("Homosexual Liberation Front"), also known as the FLH. Other groups which joined the FLH included Safo, Eros, and Bandera Negra. This new group was more politically active than those that preceded it, including Nuestro Mundo itself. The FLH eventually dissolved as a result of the 1976 Argentine coup d'état.
