= Federal Correctional Complex of the Autonomous City of Buenos Aires =

Prison in Buenos Aires, Argentina

Coordinates: 34°36′54″S 58°30′53.3″W

- Location in Buenos Aires
- Location: Devoto, Buenos Aires, Argentina
- Status: Operational
- Population: 1800+
- Opened: 1927
- Managed by: Servicio Penitenciario Federal

The Devoto prison (Spanish: Cárcel de Devoto), officially named "Complejo Penitenciario Federal de la Ciudad Autónoma de Buenos Aires" was built in 1927 as a medium-security prison and managed by the Policia Federal Argentina. In 1978 a prison riot broke out, referred to as the "Motín de los colchones", which ended with 60 deaths and 85 injuries.

President Cristina Fernández de Kirchner announced in 2011 that the prison would be shut down and the prisoners transferred to a new complex in Mercedes, Buenos Aires. As of 2020, the Devoto prison remains fully operational with less than 8% of the inmates transferred to other prisons. Plans for the Mercedes complex were scrapped in 2018 and another in Marcos Paz, Buenos Aires announced instead.
