= Balam (magazine) =

Latin American photography magazine

- One of the two covers of Balam's eleventh issue, "Radical" (2025), featuring a 1973 photograph by Nan Goldin.
- Categories: Photography magazine; Photobook; Art book
- Frequency: Annual
- Format: Online publication (2015–2018); Print publication (2018–present)
- Founder: Luis Juárez
- Founded: April 2015; 11 years ago
- Based in: Buenos Aires, Argentina
- Language: Spanish; Portuguese; English
- Website: revistabalam.com
- OCLC: 1409799160

Balam is an independent annual magazine based in Buenos Aires, Argentina that is focused on Latin American contemporary photography, with special emphasis on queer artists and the particularities of their regional context. Originally established as an online magazine in 2015, it became a print publication from its fifth publication in early 2018 onwards. Balam has had ten issues, six of which were released in print form. Although presented as a magazine, Balam's concept is closer to that of a photobook or an art object: each issue starts with a unique theme, selected contributors and specific printing features for that particular issue. The most recent, eleventh edition of the magazine, titled "Radical" and focusing on queer community archives, was launched in 2025.

Balam is recognized as Latin America's first and only queer magazine dedicated to photography. According to Dalia Al-Dujaili of the British Journal of Photography, the publication "offers a vital platform for the communities, experiences and landscapes both of the past and the present which face stigmatisation and censorship across [the region]." Each issue of Balam is built through an open call for photographers from all over the world to submit their work. It has showcased both emerging photographers as well as well-established names.

In 2022, Balam received the Shannon Michael Cane Award given to emerging artists and publishers by the NY Art Book Fair. In 2023, the magazine produced the photobook Playfulness in collaboration with the American independent publisher Pomegranate Press, its eighth issue was exhibited at the Latin American Art Museum of Buenos Aires (MALBA), and its ninth issue was the subject of an exhibition at the Brazilian Institute of Architects, São Paulo. The same year, Balam won the "Photography Content of the Year, Print or Online" prize at the Lucie Awards. Several issues of Balam have been acquired by the libraries of the Museum of Modern Art (MoMA), the San Francisco Museum of Art, the Metropolitan Museum of Art, the Cleveland Museum of Art, the Center for Curatorial Studies, Bard College, the Rhode Island School of Design, the University of Southern California, Stanford University, the Getty Research Institute, and Michigan State University.

In 2025, e-flux announced that Balam was one of the recipients of the third edition of the Fundación Ama Amoedo Grants, intended for the editing and printing of the next edition of the magazine, which will be focused on the Caribbean LGBTQ+ community.

== Concept ==
Balam is a photography magazine that is published in Buenos Aires, Argentina. It was conceived in 2015 by Luis Juárez, a university student from Honduras who had emigrated to Buenos Aires in 2009, but was then living in Santiago, Chile. The creation of the project was a response to the art and photography scene of South America, characterized by limited cultural funding, "stuffy institutionalism", and the prevalence of "hetero-cis white content". Interviewed in 2021, Juárez stated that the magazine "arose in response to how photography is being fractured, unable to represent and make visible dissident and marginalised communities. (...) [I wanted to explore] realities that are outside the norm." The term "balam"—meaning "jaguar" in the languages of the Maya peoples—is a reference to the long iconographic tradition of the animal in Mesoamerica, as well as a homage to Juárez' Honduran origin, who felt the name "refers to passion".

Although presented as a magazine, the conceptual intent of Balam is closer to that of a photobook or an art object: each issue is created from scratch, with a unique theme, selected contributors and specific printing features designed for that particular issue. Each release of Balam is built around a theme from which an open call for photographers is put out. The direction and content of each installment are built around these submissions. Interviewed by ELISAVA in 2024, Juárez explained the importance of these calls: "The open call mechanism is the main reason why the project exists. It shapes us, reaffirms us and acts as a situational x-ray of what is happening both in our continent and beyond. The call is open to any person or project regardless of geography." Since the release of its first printed issue, Balam has been presented and distributed in art galleries and independent bookstores in cities such as Buenos Aires, Santiago, London, New York City, Paris, Madrid, Barcelona, Valencia, and Melbourne, among others. In order for Balam to have its own space for dissemination outside of bookstores or museums, the magazine's team also created the Feria Migra in 2018, an art book fair devoted to independent publications and printed art that is mainly held in Buenos Aires and has been carried out several times a year since then. In addition to the magazine, Balam also organizes workshops, talks and screening cycles, in addition to creating specific content for its online platform.

Balam has been considered the only project of its kind in Argentina and, broadly speaking, in Latin America as a whole, so it mainly takes publications from outside the continent as reference points. It is focused on the contemporary photography of Latin America, with special emphasis on queer realities and the peculiarities of their regional context. In 2024, the British Journal of Photography described Balam as the first and only queer magazine dedicated to photography in Latin America. The magazine also explores a variety of social issues that are specially prominent in the region, including racism, violence, immigration and marginalisation, among others. The magazine presents itself with the aim of "promoting new ways of showing photography from a Latin American point of view". Júarez has also described Balam as a "response to the photography system, to the lack of visibility, and to understanding the importance of the decentralisation from the status quo", and noted that in 2024 that it had "become a documentary manifesto, a reaffirmation of who we are and a record of the passing of the identities of the LGBTQ+ community." Writing for AnOther magazine in 2021, Dominique Sisley noted that Balam "works on two levels. On the first, it spotlights the more serious issues faced by Latin America's LGBTQ+ community, highlighting its injustices and forgotten history. At the same time, it opens up the conversation, celebrating the more mundane, everyday experiences to encourage relatability and accessibility." Dalia Al-Dujaili of the British Journal of Photography wrote in 2024:

Balam offers a vital platform for the communities, experiences and landscapes both of the past and the present which face stigmatisation and censorship across Latin America. For this reason, Balam has collective work and community efforts to thank for its livelihood, relying on allies and friends who support the team with various resources. (...) Though they have a lot to learn, the team at Balam is riding a strong wave, having started from zero and being self-taught to working with some of the photography community’s most exciting names, they hope to use their resilience as a tool for continued change in photography and publishing.

== Publication history ==
=== 2015–2021 ===
In its first four issues, Balam was published as an online magazine. The titles and unifying themes of each of these releases are: "Me encantaría sentir algo" (English: "I would love to feel something"; April 2015), "Piel" (English: "Skin"; August 2015), "Género" (English: "Gender"; December 2015) and "Extranjerismos" (English: "Foreignness"; December 2016). Between 2016 and 2017, Balam sought to consolidate itself as a project that existed outside of digital content, and began to seek funds to take the step towards print publication. This culminated in the awarding of the Mecenazgo program (i.e. patronage) of the Government of the City of Buenos Aires, which allowed the magazine to be printed from its fifth publication in early 2018 onwards.

The first printed issue of the magazine (and the fifth overall) was published in 2018 and is centered on the theme of "Metamorfosis" (English: "Metamorphosis"). The choice of topic was inspired by the 1915 novella of the same name by Franz Kafka. The sixth issue of Balam was published two years later and revolves around the theme of "Mestizx", a "Latin term for mixed-racial heritage." The magazine explained the idea behind this theme: "We see individuals as mixed beings, mestizx in blood, skin, inspiration and gender. We would like to ask in what ways you see our generation as mestizx. This issue seeks to empower the concept of mestizx and all those working with it." According to Matt Alagiah of It's Nice That, the issue "challenges perceptions of established beauty and aims to spark conversations about patriarchal white heteronormativity." Among the works included, the "Mestizx" issue features photographs from Sunil Gupta's 1976 series "Christopher Street".

The seventh issue of Balam was published in 2021 and is organized under the topic of "Fantasía" (English: "Fantasy"). According to Juárez, the idea of "Fantasía" was born during the production of "Mestizx", as it "aroused a curiosity to know where fantasies arose from, what it is like to create 'forbidden' things, make our own worlds far from what is established and regulated." AnOther's Dominique Sisley described it as "loose theme that refers vaguely to any 'images, stories, events' that do not 'exist' in a patriarchal society. There are stories on dreams, eroticism, trans rights, and subversive beauty ideals." The issue is subdivided into five sections: "La isla" (English: "The Island"), "Jardines" (English: "Gardens"), "Bellxs" (English: "Beauties"), "Cócteles" (English: "Cocktails"), "Morfeo" (English: "Morpheus") and "Cárites" and (English: "Charities"). It includes photographs from Alejandro Kuropatwa's famous 1996 series Cóctel, which criticized the antiretroviral pills of the HIV/AIDS crisis.

=== 2022–2023 ===
The open call for Balam's eight issue began on June 1, 2022, and lasted until July 1, 2022. Published that year, the issue is organized under the theme of "Familias Elegidas" (English: "Chosen Families") and features Brazilian travesti artist Ventura Profana as guest editor. Interviewed by It's Nice That, Juarez stated about the collaboration with the artist: "Who better to travel these worlds than a travesti missionary pastor; a mediator between humanity and divinity; a prophet of dissident lives, of their multiplication and abundance?" The open call for the edition explained that the theme of "Chosen Families" intended to "put out and show through the image stories of families established by choice, to show an evolution in cultural understanding and social norms that cross them and evidence the obsolescence of dominant, determinant and coercive mandates such as marriage and parenthood, generally alien to the problems and desires of queer identities." That year, Balam received the Shannon Michael Cane Award given to emerging artists and publishers by the NY Art Book Fair.

In 2023, Balam published a book in collaboration with the independent publishing house Pomegranate Press, based in Richmond, Virginia, US. Entitled Playfulness, the photobook was presented by the projects as a "dual attempt to capture, in some way, what it might mean to have fun, explore and be curious about the world around us." Printed in Argentina, it has a first edition of 500 copies, 116 pages, and a Swiss binding with embossed text on the back cover. In the book's introduction, Pomegranate Press stated: "Luis and I met in New York City. I had been aware of his work with his beautiful magazine (Balam) for quite some time, but before meeting face to face, I had no idea who was behind the project. (...) After I returned home to Richmond and he to Buenos Aires, we unsurprisingly remained in contact. (...) After a few short months of communication, I made the conversation about work and suggested the idea of collaborating together on an ambitious project (hint: this book). (...) I am just grateful to be part of his vision, however briefly."

Also in 2023, the eighth edition of Balam was shown in the exhibition Del cielo a casa. Conexiones e intermitencias en la cultura material argentina (English: "From Heaven to Home. Connections and Intermittences in Argentinean Material Culture"), held from March 23 to July 30 of that year at the Latin American Art Museum of Buenos Aires (MALBA). The exhibition—which broke attendance records for the museum— brought together works of art, design pieces and domestic objects chosen for their affective value in the Argentine imaginary, organized in "thirteen groups presented as constellations of thought and intuition". Balam magazine was displayed as part of the group entitled "Home", and is reproduced in the exhibition book with a photograph by Cecilia Gil. That same year, Balam participated in the LA Art Book Fair (LAABF) held at the Geffen Contemporary space of the Museum of Contemporary Art in Los Angeles.

The open call for the ninth issue of Balam ran from January 17 to March 1, 2023. Released the same year, the issue focuses on the theme of "New Masculinities" (Spanish: "Nuevas Masculinidades") and features Dominican artist Oscar 1992 as guest editor. It includes photographs by artists from Mexico, Brazil, Australia and the United States, among others, as well as texts by Cole Rizki, Diego Tedeschi, Dulcina Abreu, Facundo Blanco and Igor Furtado. In the official presentation, Balam called for "projects that subvert the rules of the normative white male, discuss the power relations that nurture notions of 'masculinity' and, above all, redefine the path and acceptance of faggots, queers, trans identities, crossdressers, racialized subjects and the infinite ways of being within the LGBTIQ+ community." The issue is presented as a "school of scoundrels", and quotes Pedro Lemebel's famous text Manifesto (I speak for my difference) (1986): "Won't there be a faggot on some street corner unbalancing the future of his new man?". After the publication of the ninth issue of Balam, Soy described the magazine as an "object to treasure" and noted: "The vastness and beauty of the content is a center of gravitation that attracts and retains. All of them are a necessary stop on the magazine's journey, and we will want to return to more than one of them". In a dialogue with Soy magazine, Juárez talked about the dialogue between images and texts in the edition:

For example, in this issue we begin with a series of photographs about "the new man," about transmasculinities, and we close with a text by Cole Rizki that reflects on the visibility of these masculinities. Cole is a trans intellectual from the University of Virginia. He looked at our photographs and, from the first person, reflected on them. I think it is very important that the readers have access to the intimacy of the writer, that the reflections are made from that intimacy. When you read Balam, you read it as much from the photos as from the texts.

At the 2023 edition of the Lucie Awards, held in October, the ninth issue of Balam received the "Photography Content of the Year, Print or Online" prize. The "New Masculinities" issue was also the subject of an art exhibition held from December 1 to 20, 2023 in São Paulo, a collaboration between the art gallery Central Galeria and the Brazilian Institute of Architects (Portuguese: Instituto de Arquitetos do Brasil; IABsp). The exhibition was curated by Thyago Nogueira, with an exhibition design by Tiago Guimarães and production by Fe Avila. Central Galeria and the IABsp described the exhibition as "presented through the physical material of its own magazine, transferred to the walls. Assembling a cartography, or rather, a new edition that is composed from the intersection with other editions, raising questions about stereotypes, sexuality and colonial norms around distorted male corporealities."

=== 2024–present ===
Between April 24 and May 26, 2024, Balam presented a window installation at Printed Matter Chelsea titled "0800-TAKE-ME-HOME: Rebelliousness in Queer Artists' Publications and Photography". The display was part of a series of site-specific installations that have been carried out at Printed Matter's storefront windows since the 1970s, in which artists such as Jenny Holzer, Barbara Kruger, Antoni Muntadas and Richard Prince have participated over the years. Curated by Juárez, "0800-TAKE-ME-HOME" featured a selection of photography-based publications and explored the connection between sex work and gender nonconforming identities, with a direct reference to the "flirty design vernacular of the popular papelitos de oferta sexual that adorn public spaces in Latin America to advertise local sex services." Printed Matter explained that the installation "seeks to promote Juárez’s curated selection with flyers that personify each publication, enticing the viewer to pick them up and take them home" and that, "through this exchange, these narratives of marginalized identities and labors are afforded further witness and respect — affirming that sex work is work and the pleasure of LGBTIQ+ people is powerful in its boundlessness."

The open call for the tenth anniversary issue of Balam ran from January 16 to March 1, 2024. Published that year, the issue is organized under the theme of "La Bohemia" (English: "La Boheme") and once again features Ventura Profana as guest editor, along with fellow Brazilian artist Castiel Vitorino Brasileiro. In conversation with the British Journal of Photography, Juárez explained that the theme "bloomed as a response to the collapse of ecosystems, oversaturation of media, and hegemonic visions, especially in photography." He further noted that "we conceive bohemia as something we must safeguard and preserve" and that the issue aims to "echo the ruptures, especially of the religious, spiritual, musical, aesthetic, academic, and imaginary boundaries established by colonisation, cultural aspects in direct dialogue with the history of photography." "La Bohemia" includes photographs of the indigenous Amazonians by Florence Goupil, Rafaella Kennedy and Labo Young, as well as archival footage of Jamaican dancehall culture by Akeem Smith and a "collective project by Retratistas do Morro preserving a historical artistic movement that emerged in the 1960s in the Brazilian favelas."

In May 2024, Juárez was a presenter at the public talks event "Discourses 2 Radical Forms in Printed Matter" curated by Andrew Hodgson and held as part of the Paris Ass Book Fair at the Palais de Tokyo. Balam was also part of an international group exhibition for the first time, "Grow It, Show It! A Look at Hair from Diane Arbus to TikTok", which took place between September 13, 2024 and January 15, 2025 at Museum Folkwang, Germany. The exhibition "explores the historical, political and everyday cultural significance of hair" and features works by artists like Diane Arbus, Nan Goldin, Helmut Newton, Graciela Iturbide and Wolfgang Tillmans, among several others. On the occasion of "Grow It, Show It!", Juárez also gave a workshop on zine creation at the museum. Also in September 2024, Juárez participated as a guest expert at the annual Plat(t)form event, held at the Fotomuseum Winterthur, Switzerland, and presented "La Bohemia" at the Sultana art gallery in Paris. Throughout 2024, Balam additionally participated in the ICP Photobook Fest, Unseen Amsterdam, Athens Art Book Fair, San Francisco Art Book Fair, and Printed Matter NY Art Book Fair.

The open call for the eleventh issue of Balam ran from February 4 to March 4, 2025 and published later that year. Titled "Radical", the issue focuses on queer community archives and features Argentine trans rights activist María Belén Correa, founder of the Archivo de la Memoria Trans, as the guest editor. The magazine described the "Radical" concept as "tied to the disruptive and transformative nature of LGBTIQ+ archives. These archives not only challenge heteronormative hegemony but also question the traditional power structures that have excluded our numerous subjectivities. The radical lies in the act of documenting what has been ignored, in building chosen families through memory, and in listening to those who have been systematically silenced. Each archive is both a declaration of existence and a call to resist." In this way, the issue brings together various Latin American projects that reflect on the idea of LGBTQ archives, such as the Archivo Hondura Cuir, the Museo de Arte Transfemenino of Mexico, the Archivo Qiwa of Bolivia or the Archivo Memoria Disidente of Peru. According to Juárez, this is the first time that a photography magazine has brought together and paid tribute to these kind of archives, most of them Latin American, but also from other territories such as the Indonesia Queer Archive and the work of Mohamad Abdouni and his project Treat Me Like Your Mother, which focused on trans women in Beirut. Writing for Soy, Emmanuel Franco noted that "Radical" "emphasizes not only the content of these archives but also how they are displayed and worked on by the communities that generate them, a fundamental non-negotiable when it comes to constructing a narrative that does not remain on the surface and allows depth to be seen. Queer dissidents may be capable of generating their own tools when it comes to conceiving a collection; they are not obliged to follow the methodologies created by those institutions that at one time excluded them."

In 2025, e-flux announced that Balam was among the recipients of the third edition of the Fundación Ama Amoedo Grants, which will support the editing and printing of the magazine’s forthcoming twelfth issue. The foundation's website noted that the issue will be organized under the topic of "Sirenas del Caribe" (English: "Mermaids of the Caribbean"), focusing on the "concept of Neo-Carib, a contemporary Caribbean identity that after recognizing the traces of colonialism, slavery, and diaspora, embraces fluidity, hybridity, and the future."

== Printed publications ==
- Juárez, Luis, ed. (2018). "Metamorfosis" [Metamorphosis]. Balam (in Spanish and English). No. 5. Buenos Aires, Argentina. ISSN 2591-6300.
- Juárez, Luis; Fieiras, Verónica, eds. (2020). "Mestizx". Balam (in Spanish and English). No. 6. Buenos Aires, Argentina. ISSN 2684-0405.
- Juárez, Luis; González-Aguirre, César, eds. (2021). "Fantasía" [Fantasy]. Balam (in Spanish, Portuguese, and English). No. 7. Buenos Aires, Argentina.
- Juárez, Luis; Ventura Profana, eds. (2022). "Familias Elegidas" [Chosen Families]. Revista Balam (in Spanish, Portuguese, and English). No. 8. Buenos Aires, Argentina.
- Playfulness (group book) (in English and Spanish). Richmond, US; Buenos Aires, Argentina: Pomegranate Press; Revista Balam. 2023. First edition of 500 copies. Printed in Argentina.
- Juárez, Luis; Oscar 1992, eds. (2023). "Nuevas Masculinidades" [New Masculinities]. Revista Balam (in Spanish, Portuguese, and English). No. 9. Buenos Aires, Argentina.
- Juárez, Luis; Vitorino Brasileiro, Castiel; Ventura Profana, eds. (2024). "La Bohemia" [La Boheme]. Revista Balam (in Spanish, Portuguese, and English). No. 10. Anniversary Issue. Buenos Aires, Argentina.
- Juárez, Luis; Correa, María Belén, eds. (2025). "Radical". Revista Balam (in Spanish, Portuguese, and English). No. 11. Buenos Aires, Argentina.

== See also ==
- List of art magazines
- List of LGBT periodicals
- List of magazines in Argentina
- List of online magazines
