= Archivo de la Memoria Trans =

Argentine archive and activist organization focused on trans people

- Location: Buenos Aires, Argentina
- Type: Trans community archive; independent publisher
- Scope: Trans community in Argentina
- Established: 2012; 14 years ago

Collection
- Items collected: Photographs, films, sound recordings, newspaper and magazine articles, documents, letters, postcards, notes and police files, among others.
- Size: Over 25,000 items
- Criteria for collection: Contributions that document the lives of trans people in Argentina.

Other information
- Founder and director: María Belén Correa
- Team: Correa, Cecilia Estalles, Carola Figueredo, Teté Vega, Luis Juárez, Sonia Beatriz Torrese, Carolina Nastri, Marina Cisneros, Katiana Villagra, Iris Kaufman, Luciana Leiras, Marcela Navarro, Mychel Aguilera, Lina Etchesuri, Sofía Naara, Alejandro Correa, Muriel Bruschi and Monica de Valle Arancibia
- Website: archivotrans.ar

The Archivo de la Memoria Trans (AMT; English: "Trans Memory Archive") is an Argentine trans community archive dedicated to compiling and recovering the history and cultural heritage of transgender, transsexual and travesti people in the country. The Archive aims to act as a collective memory for Argentine trans identities, ensuring that their stories, especially of those who endured and resisted systemic discrimination and violence—frequently silenced or erased by official narratives—are preserved and made widely accessible to the community. The project was conceived by trans activists María Belén Correa and Claudia Pía Baudracco and founded by the former in 2012, shortly after the latter's death. It began as a closed Facebook group created by Correa, focused on sharing personal photographs and anecdotes from Argentine trans women, and over time—with the help of photographer Cecilia Estalles—evolved into a small collective dedicated to the collection, preservation and digitization of materials, adhering to archival standards. The Archive contains more than 25,000 items that document the life of trans people in Argentina—dating from the beginning of the 20th century to the late 1990s—including photographs, films, sound recordings, newspaper and magazine articles, identity documents, letters, postcards, notes and police files. The project's archivists are older transgender women who have, for the first time, gained entry into a professional and labor environment of this nature. A pioneering project in Latin America, the Archive has inspired several initiatives in other countries of the region, including Mexico, Honduras, Cuba, Colombia, Chile and Uruguay, among others. Alongside its preservation mission, the AMT has undertaken several political demonstrations and legal actions seeking historical reparations for the trans community. In 2023, the Archive received the highest Honoris Causa distinction given by the National University of La Plata.

In addition to its preservation and activist efforts, the AMT has set the goal of disseminating its material, which has been showcased both physically and on digital platforms in museums and institutions within the country and abroad, such as the Reina Sofía Museum, Tate Modern and the São Paulo Biennial, giving international recognition to the project. The Archive was also the subject of a documentary series that premiered on the Encuentro channel, produced a podcast and a radionovela, and took part in the documentary film Family Album (2024). After the previous experience of co-editing a photobook in 2020 with Buenos Aires-based publisher Editorial Chaco, in 2022 the AMT founded its own independent publisher, dedicated to promoting transgender authors and topics. The AMT publisher's first book was Si te viera tu madre, released the same year, which focused on Baudracco's life and activism through texts and photos. It was followed by Nuestro códigos in 2023, a book object that includes photos and quotes by trans women that dialogue with documents from other archives, coming from the institutions that were in charge of persecuting the community. In 2024, the AMT published the book Kumas and an updated reprint of the first 2020 photobook, as well as two zines: La abuela y la Travesti and El amor volverá. The work of the AMT also played a fundamental role in a landmark judicial ruling of 27 March 2024, which, for the first time, recognized trans women as victims of the last civic-military dictatorship.

== History and mission ==
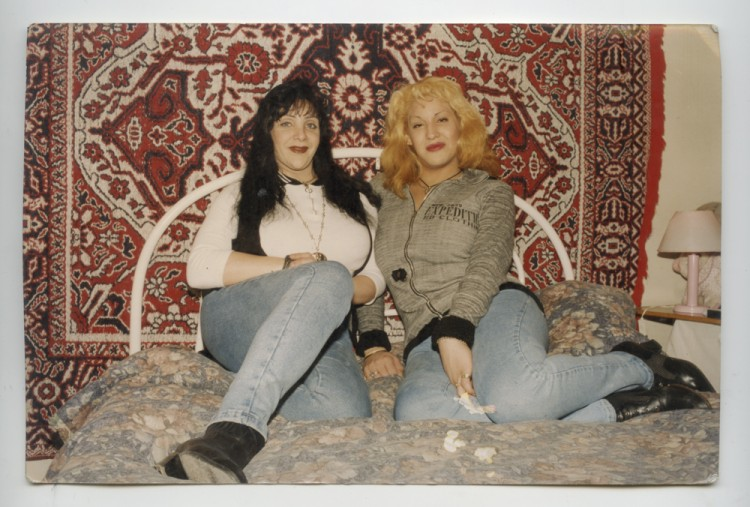
Activists Claudia Pía Baudracco (left) and María Belén Correa (right)—the ones who conceived the Archive—photographed in 1993.

The Archivo de la Memoria Trans (AMT; English: "Trans Memory Archive") was conceived by the influential activists Claudia Pía Baudracco and María Belén Correa, who helped kickstart the organized Argentine trans rights movement in the early 1990s. In 2012, the movement for trans rights in the country achieved its greatest victory yet with the passing of the Gender Identity Law, a pioneer law worldwide that allows trans people to be recognized and treated according to their self-perceived identity without pathologizing them, ensuring full healthcare coverage for gender-related treatments across public and private systems. Correa has often stated that the passing of the Gender Identity Law marked the arrival of true democracy for trans people, who, despite the country's return to democracy in 1983, continued to face persecution, violence, and discrimination. Two months before the law's passing, Baudracco, one of the main proponents of the law, died, and Correa decided to found the Archive shortly thereafter. In 2025, she wrote: "The Law was a historic event that changed our lives forever. It marked the end of a policy of persecution and the beginning of a policy of inclusion. In Argentina, where the search for identity has been a constant struggle, democracy only truly arrived for trans people in 2012. In the heat of activism, of defending our lives, we always had to keep looking forward — to the next action, the next mobilization. For me, the Law didn't just mean an ID; it also meant the possibility of looking back, of recovering memory." Correa refers to the struggle of the Mothers and Grandmothers of Plaza de Mayo for "Memory, Truth and Justice" on behalf of the victims of state terrorism during the last civic-military dictatorship—an effort she has cited as a fundamental influence in the creation of the AMT.

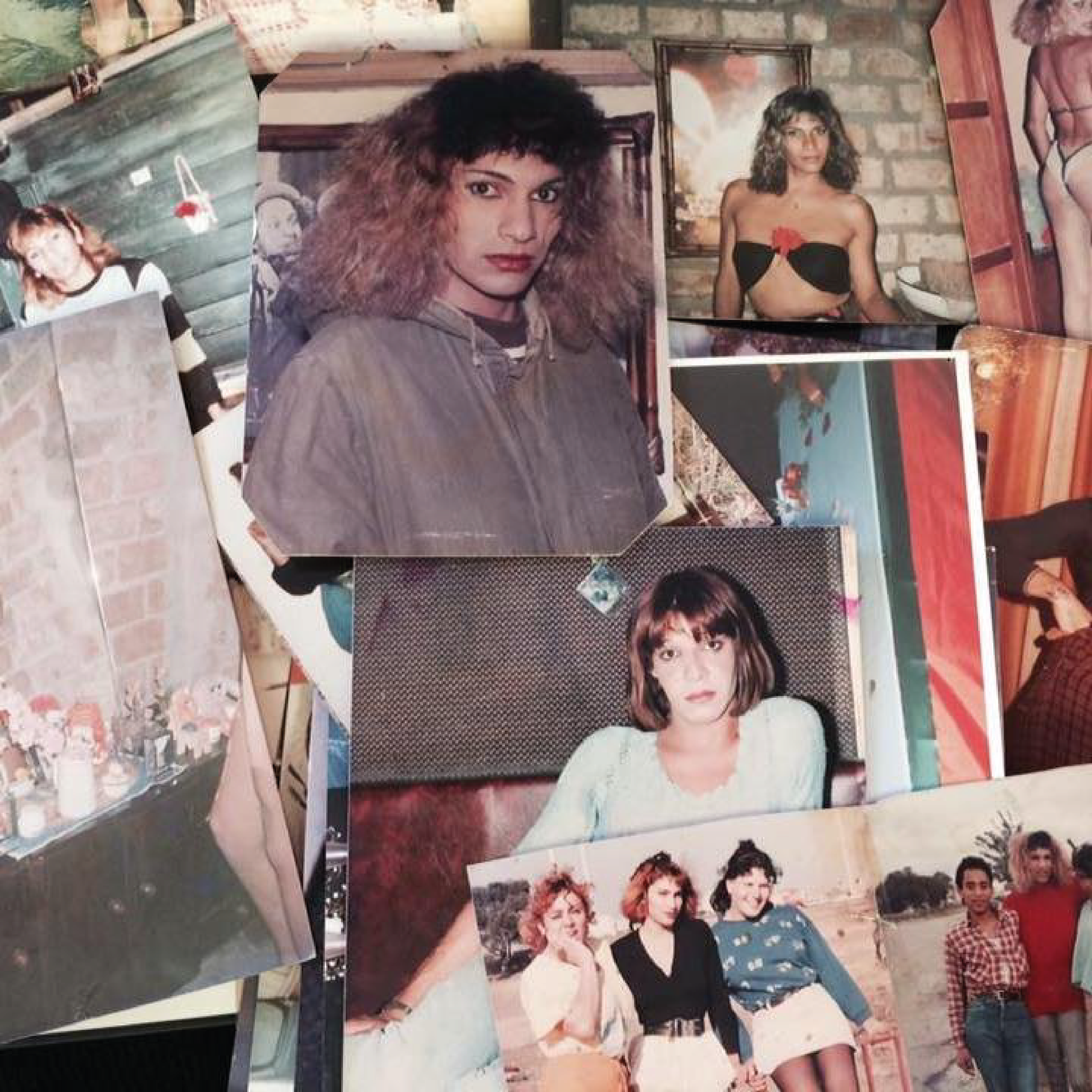
A collection of photographs preserved in the Archive.

Following Baudracco's death, Correa inherited a box in which she had collected her memories—comprising six thousand items, including photographs, documents, and various other materials chronicling her life and activism, as well as that of other trans companions; that box became the first archival collection of the AMT. The mission of the Archive is to compile and recover the history and cultural heritage of transgender, transsexual, and travesti people in the country, with the aim of serving as a collective memory for Argentine trans identities. It seeks to ensure that the stories of those who endured and resisted systemic discrimination and violence—often silenced or erased by official narratives—are preserved and made widely accessible to the community. In its early stages, the project began as a private Facebook group created by Correa, where trans survivors could reconnect and share memories and, in Correa's words, "first and foremost, to know that we were alive." Writing in 2025, she recalled:

"Over time, we began to build a collection that was considered a treasure. It is no exaggeration to apply that term to each of our photos and belongings, however small or blurred they might be: for a long time, in our country—and in many others across Latin America—our histories were erased, even completely wiped out. (...) Our families, many consumed by shame and rejection, silenced us, tried to change us, or expelled us from our homes. (...) Despite so much death, and in so many forms, with each recovered photo, our lives became even more intense, more brilliant. (...) Our shared need, expressed in the messages exchanged in our private Facebook group, was to tell and preserve these stories, and to embrace each other again. (...) These photographs began to bear witness to our 'activism before activism,' to our existence as resistance."

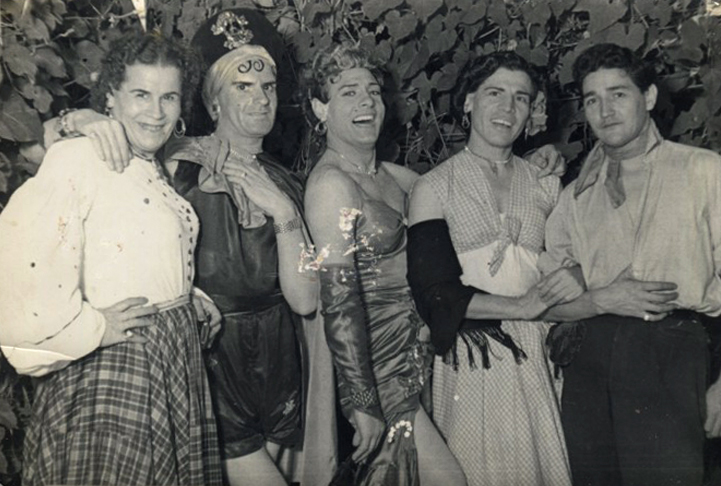
Photograph from 1945, among the oldest in the Archive's collection as part of Malva Solís's holdings, the longest-lived travesti in the country.

In 2014, Correa came into contact with photographer Cecilia Estalles, who would bring a new perspective to the project. With Estalles' incorporation, the Archive expanded its work of collecting and preserving materials, sourcing them through contacts made in the Facebook group, and gradually took shape as both a physical archive and a digital collection, utilizing professional preservation techniques. Furthermore, Estalles promoted within the group the idea that the materials should be disseminated to make the history and struggle of the community visible, challenging established perspectives and ensuring they were known to society at large. In Correa's own words: "At first, I didn’t think our archive needed to be visible, as it consisted of personal photos and memories, mostly intimate. But Estalles' perspective made me rethink this: visibility, now decided by us, could break many of the burdens society had imposed on us, especially in the mass media. (...) By making our most personal memories visible, we managed to disrupt, for example, Google's algorithm: until we shared our material firsthand, searching for a photo of an Argentine travesti/trans woman would bring up images of crossdressers or sensationalist press photos that harmed our community, defaming our identities, telling our stories from false perspectives, and using degrading adjectives for many years." This led to two small exhibitions, primarily aimed at the LGBTQ community, held at a branch of the Federación Argentina de Lesbianas, Gays, Bisexuales y Trans (FALGBT; English: "Argentine Federation of Lesbians, Gays, Bisexuals and Trans People"). In 2017, with a more established team, the AMT designed its first exhibition at the Centro Cultural de la Memoria Haroldo Conti—a highly symbolic venue, as it is located in the former clandestine detention center ESMA—and from there, the AMT gained greater recognition and expanded the circulation of its material.

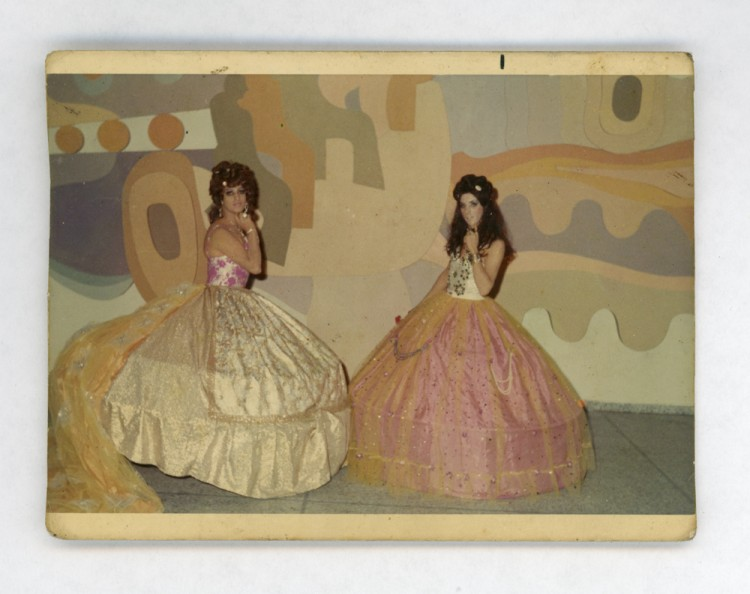
Photograph from a 1970 carnival celebration, part of the Archive's significant collection of carnival images, capturing the rare moments when trans people could freely express themselves in public.

In 2018, the AMT received the Ibermemoria award, granted by the Ibero-American General Secretariat, which provided training in documentation and archive management. This enabled the project to adopt professional archiving standards, moving beyond the "intuitive" methods previously guided by Estalles' expertise in photography. In addition, the AMT obtained legal status, which allowed it to apply for grants and subsidies, secure a workspace, and pay and receive professional fees. One of the AMT's goals has been to become a source of employment for older trans individuals, most of whom lack access to retirement benefits and have been excluded from state institutions; its team is made up of older trans women who, for the first time, have gained access to professional development opportunities that had once seemed out of reach. The Archive also offers training in image digitization, contemporary photography and creative writing for the trans individuals who work there. The following years marked a period of significant growth and international recognition for the project, with invitations to participate in international conferences on archiving and sexual diversity activism, and appearances in exhibitions at venues including Tate Modern's website, the Virreina Palace and Museo Reina Sofía in Madrid, the Moreira Salles Institute in São Paulo and the 35th São Paulo Art Biennial, as well as in numerous well-known museums and institutions across Argentina. The AMT was the subject of a 2021 documentary series that premiered on the Encuentro channel, produced a podcast and a radionovela, and took part in the documentary film Family Album (2024).

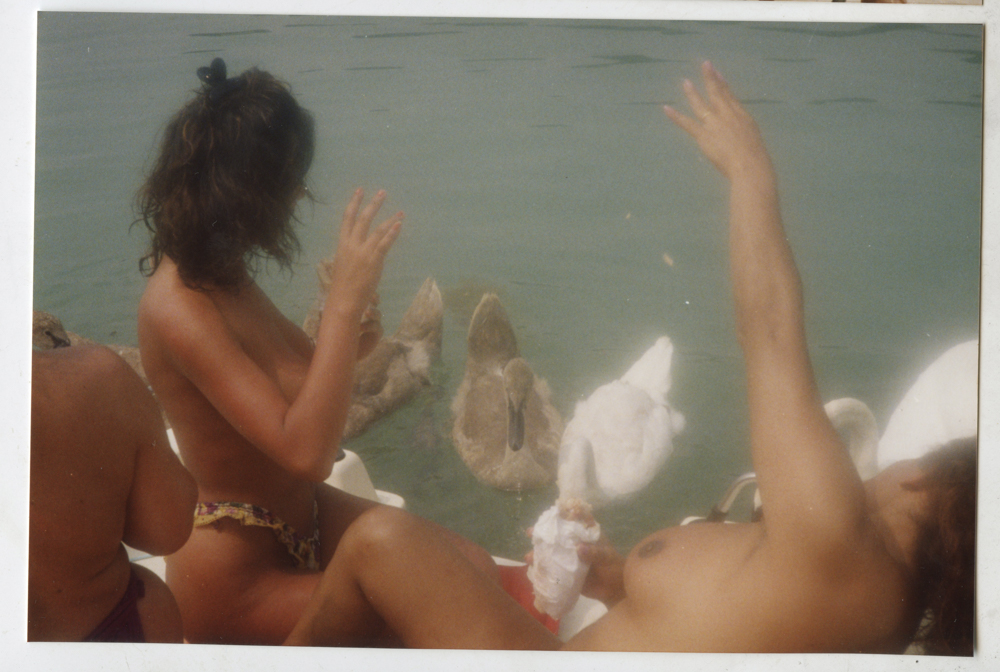
Photograph from 1991, taken during Baudracco's exile in Italy. A recurring theme in the Archive's collections, exile often represented one of the few pathways for Argentine trans individuals to live openly.

The first printed publication of materials from the Archivo de la Memoria Trans was a photobook of the same name, published in 2020 by the Buenos Aires-based publisher Editorial Chaco. After this first experience in the publishing world, the AMT founded its own independent publisher in 2022, dedicated to promoting transgender authors and topics. Correa has outlined the objective of the AMT publishing house as providing a platform for trans individuals to tell their own stories, a rare opportunity in other publishing outlets, as well as to create employment for trans people. The AMT publisher's first book was Si te viera tu madre, released the same year, which focused on Baudracco's life and activism through texts and photos. The following title was Nuestro códigos in 2023, a book object that includes photos and quotes by trans women that dialogue with documents from other archives, coming from the institutions that were in charge of persecuting the community. In 2024, the AMT published the book Kumas and an updated reprint of the first 2020 photobook (known as El libro rosa, i. e., "the pink book"), as well as two zines: La abuela y la Travesti and El amor volverá. Unlike the previous books, where photographs took precedence, Kumas features 19 first-person testimonies from travestis and trans women, in which they share their life stories. The AMT's material has also been featured in other publications, including the Argentine photography journal Balam in 2018, the Spanish trans magazine Candy Transversal in 2022, and the book Trans Hirstory in 99 Objects, edited by Hirmer Publishers in 2024, among others.

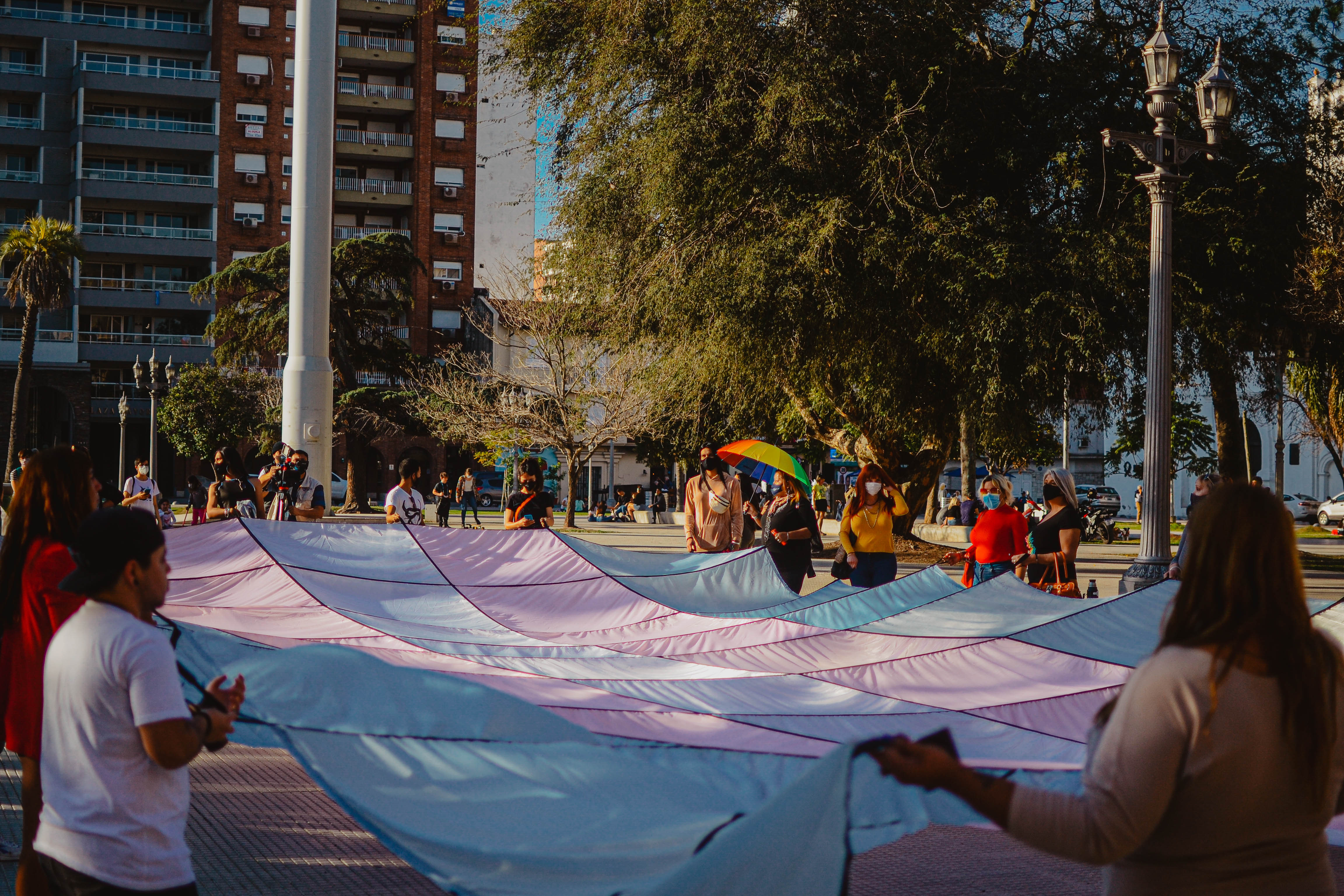
The Banderazo demonstration of the AMT in the city of Santa Fe, 22 July 2021.

In addition to its mission to preserve and share materials that recover the Argentine trans memory, the AMT has also been deeply engaged in activism, leading numerous initiatives and legal actions in the ongoing struggle for the rights of the trans community. Since 2017, on the International Transgender Day of Remembrance, celebrated on November 20th, the AMT has organized a demonstration called "the Candle Action", in which participants carry candles and photographs of trans individuals who have died or been murdered, and collectively honor their memory. Beginning in 2020, the AMT has also organized the Banderazo (from the Spanish word bandera, meaning "flag"), a nationwide action involving the journey of a large trans flag across various provinces of Argentina. At each stop, the names of deceased trans and travesti individuals are inscribed on the flag as a collective act of remembrance. A political action aimed at visibility and the pursuit of rights, the initiative culminates on the International Trans Day of Remembrance at the former ESMA clandestine detention center, and is framed within broader demands for a comprehensive trans law and historical reparation.

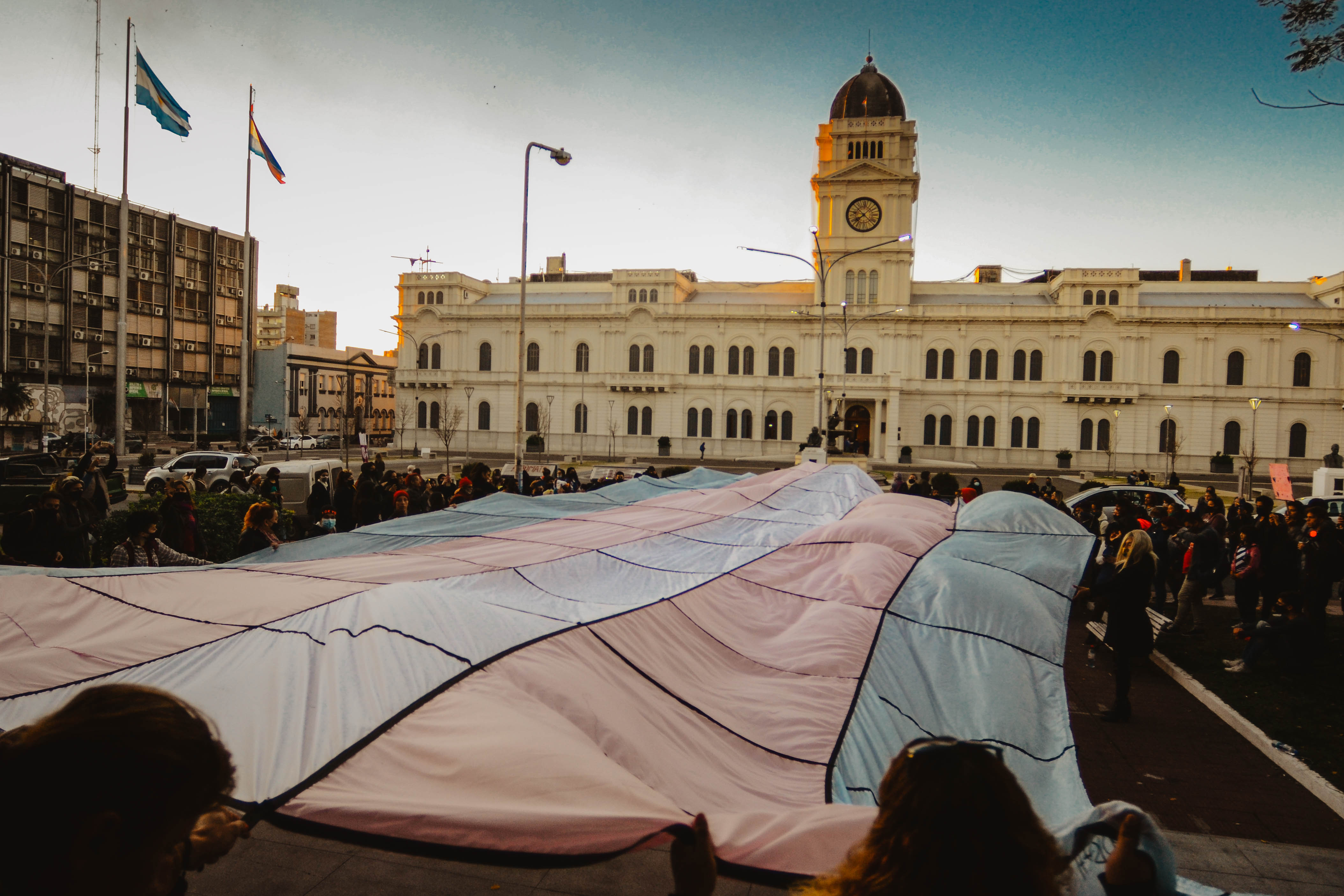
The Banderazo demonstration of the AMT in Paraná, Entre Ríos, 26 July 2021.

On 26 March 2024, a landmark verdict in the Juicio Brigadas trial marked the first time that trans women were officially recognized as victims of crimes against humanity committed during Argentina's last military dictatorship, resulting in the conviction of ten former repressors for crimes including illegal deprivation of liberty, torture and aggravated sexual abuse, perpetrated at the clandestine detention center known as Pozo de Banfield. The AMT played a key role in enabling this judicial recognition; its historical and testimonial collection was instrumental in allowing trans women to testify and be acknowledged as victims of state terrorism. Upon the news, Correa stated: "Unfortunately, these trials come too late for us, but it is gratifying that, for the first time, our trans peers are being included and able to testify about what they went through. (...) It is a historic day because, for the first time, the trans community is being included in these trials, even though for a long time memory was a privilege. I hope this is just the starting point so that our other trans peers can also begin to testify, and understand that they too can be heard."

In November 2024, with the support of the Center for Legal and Social Studies (CELS), the AMT spearheaded a legal protection request seeking official recognition of the institutional violence and structural discrimination endured for decades by thirteen trans women and travestis, with the aim to ensure their right to social security by extending the scope of the national retirement and pension law to include their experiences. This action has been described as a milestone for the Argentine trans community and seeks that other travestis and trans women over the age of 50 can access the right to social security as a measure of historical reparation. Correa, who is among the plaintiffs, stated: "This action sets a precedent, as it is the first time individuals have come forward with their police records in hand. Until now, it was always our testimonies—because, as I always say, we've always had memory and truth; what we were missing was the final part: justice."

In 2025, the AMT was announced as the winner of the Andy Rocchelli Grant, awarded by the Italian photography collective Cesura to produce and publish a photobook following an international open call. This led to the release of the book Belén, María Belén, which focuses on the life of the AMT's founder and had previously been recognized at the 2025 Dummy Award. The Archive also won the Shannon Michael Cane Award granted by Printed Matter, which enabled its participation in the New York Art Book Fair in September 2025.

== Impact ==
The AMT is regarded as a pioneering project within Latin America. It has been credited for introducing innovations to archival practice by employing a non-chronological and "affective" approach to organizing materials, with a flexible and decentralized structure that allows for a more inclusive preservation of trans histories, using diverse forms of documentation, such as oral testimonies and visual materials, that traditional archives often overlook. By focusing on the voices of trans individuals and questioning official narratives, the AMT introduces new approaches to archival practices, increasing accessibility and community involvement in memory preservation. In September 2023, the National University of La Plata awarded the highest Honoris Causa distinction to the AMT, describing it as a "tribute and recognition to the work carried out by this collective, independent and self-managed project, with the visibility of the rights of travesti and trans people in our country and thus recover those memories 40 years after the return of Democracy."

The impact of the Archive can be seen in its role as an inspiration for similar initiatives across several countries, including Mexico, Honduras, Canada, Cuba, Colombia, Chile and Uruguay. Several of these projects, such as the Archivo de la Memoria Trans México, CubaneCuir, and Archivo Honduras Cuir, have explicitly cited the AMT as their main reference point. Interviewed by Infobae in 2022, historian Patricio Simonetto stated that the proliferation of archives inspired by the AMT marks a "turning point" for the LGBTQ history of the continent, as they are "transforming our notion of what is archivable, the value of a document, and who deserves to leave a record for posterity," operating "against a heterosexual narrative that reduced these people to police chronicles or exoticism, enabling other stories defined not only by violence but also by joy."

The emergence of Latin American LGBTQ archives inspired by the AMT has also led to the development of roundtables and conferences, fostering transnational discussions and connections between these spaces, for example a 2022 "Latin American Trans Histories" roundtable organized by University College London. In 2024, the AMT, together with Brazil's Bajubá Collection—another key regional reference—organized the first Latin American Congress of Trans Archives (Spanish: Congreso Latinoamericano de Archivos Trans), a historic event that gathered representatives from archives across 14 countries. On the occasion of this congress, Correa wrote: "Sharing and spreading the language of archiving (...) is (as information is power) empowering many trans archives in the region that, since the [AMT] became visible, have echoed alongside us. (...) For us (AMT), it may have been twice as hard to reach (...) professional archiving knowledge; that's why I believe our peers will find it easier to follow the same path with the guidance provided at the Congress. The goal is for trans communities in each Latin American country to build that space of resistance, memory, and future that archives represent, in the most professional and legitimate way possible."

== Exhibitions ==
- La construcción de una Líder, FALGBT, Buenos Aires, 2014.
- En busca de la libertad: exilio y carnaval, FALGBT, Buenos Aires, 2015.
- Esta se fue, a esta la mataron, esta murió, Centro Cultural de la Memoria Haroldo Conti (former ESMA), Buenos Aires, 2 December 2017 - 2 March 2018.
- Byte Footage: La imagen arde, Centro Cultural Kirchner, Buenos Aires, May 2018.
- Retratos y carnavales, Centro Cultural General San Martín, Buenos Aires, April - May 2019; Casa de la Cultura de Vicente López, Olivos, 5 March - 26 April 2020; Centro Cultural Parque de España, Rosario, 26 June - 4 September 2021; Concejo Deliberante de Vicente López, Vicente López, 27 June - 11 July 2022.
- Archivxs LGBTIQ (group exhibition), Contemporary Art Center, Quito, 19 July - 29 September 2019.
- El tiempo de las flores, Centro de Fotografía de Montevideo, Montevideo, 13 March - 5 December 2020.
- Siempre estuvimos ahí (online exhibition), Argentine Chamber of Deputies, Buenos Aires, 21 - 31 July 2020.
- Queerate Tate (online exhibition; group exhibition), Tate Modern, London, February 2021.
- La pisada del ñandú (o cómo transformamos los silencios) (group exhibition), Virreina Palace, Barcelona, 16 July - 17 October 2021.
- Inventar a la intemperie. Desobediencias sexuales e imaginación política en el arte contemporáneo (group exhibition), Parque de la Memoria, Buenos Aires, 18 September - 12 December 2021.
- Madalena Schwartz: As metamorfoses (group exhibition), Moreira Salles Institute, São Paulo, 9 February - 26 September 2021; MALBA, Buenos Aires, 5 November 2021 - 14 March 2022.
- Hard Copy Soft Touch (group exhibition), SPRINT Milano Art Book Fair, Milan, 26 November - 28 November 2021.
- Nuestra historia, Museo del Bicentenario, Buenos Aires, 10 November 2022 - 15 January 2023.
- Esta se fue, esta la mataron, esta murió, Museo Municipal de la Ciudad de San Fernando, San Fernando, 10 June - 10 July 2023.
- Cultura colibrí (group exhibition), Museum of Modern Art, Buenos Aires, 26 August 2023 - 3 March 2024.
- 35ª Bienal de São Paulo – coreografias do impossível (group exhibition), Ciccillo Matarazzo Pavilion, São Paulo, 6 September - 10 December 2023.
- Desplegar la memoria, cartografías travestis, Museo de las Mujeres, Córdoba, 27 October 2023- 10 February 2024.
- Todas nuestras vidas, Dirección de Diversidad, Comodoro Rivadavia, November 2023.
- Son tus ojos, Centro Cultural de España, Buenos Aires, 15 March - 25 May 2024.
- Cantando Bajito: Chorus (group exhibition), Ford Foundation Gallery, New York City, 8 October - 7 December 2024.
- Rebeldes / Reveladas, Plaza de la Música 220 Cultura Contemporánea, Córdoba, 27 June - 12 September 2025.

== Publications ==
Books

- Archivo de la Memoria Trans Argentina (2020)
- Si te viera tu madre. Activismos y andanzas de Claudia Pía Baudracco (2022)
- Nuestros códigos (2023)
- Kumas (2024)
- Archivo de la Memoria Trans Argentina (El libro rosa) (2024). Updated reissue
- Belén, María Belén (2025)

Zines

- El amor volverá (2024)
- La abuela y la travesti (2024)
- Fondo Documental - Carolina Figueredo (2025)
- Fondo Documental - Ornella Olivia Vega, Teté (2025)

== See also ==
- List of archives in Argentina
- LGBTQ culture in Argentina
- LGBTQ history in Argentina
