= Family Album (2024 Argentine film) =

- Promotional release poster
- Directed by: Laura Casabé
- Written by: Paulina Bettendorff; Paulo Soria
- Produced by: Valeria Bistagnino; Tomás Eloy Muñoz Lázaro
- Cinematography: Sandra Grossi; Carolina Rolandi
- Edited by: Manuel Margulis Darriba; Ana Godoy; Laura Casabé
- Music by: Leonardo Martinelli
- Production company: Mostra Cine
- Release date: March 18, 2024 (Toulouse)
- Running time: 73 minutes
- Country: Argentina
- Language: Spanish

Family Album (Spanish: Álbum de familia) is a 2024 Argentine documentary film co-edited and directed by Laura Casabé. It follows the life and work of Claudia Pía Baudracco, an Argentine activist for the rights of trans women before and after the Argentine military dictatorship.

== Synopsis ==
Documentary film composed of archive images, photos and interviews that portray the life and work of activist Claudia Pía Baudracco for the rights of trans women and LGBT people in Argentina.

== Release ==
Family Album had its world premiere on March 18, 2024, at the 37th Toulouse Latin America Film Festival, then was screened on October 5, 2024, at the 12th International Documentary Film Festival, Buenos Aires, and on October 20, 2024, at the 11th Asterisk International Festival LGBTIQ+ cinema.

== Accolades ==
Year	Award / Festival	Category	Recipient	Result	Ref.
2024	12th International Documentary Film Festival, Buenos Aires	Best Queer Film	Family Album	Won	
