= Mariana Casas =

Argentine lawyer and activist

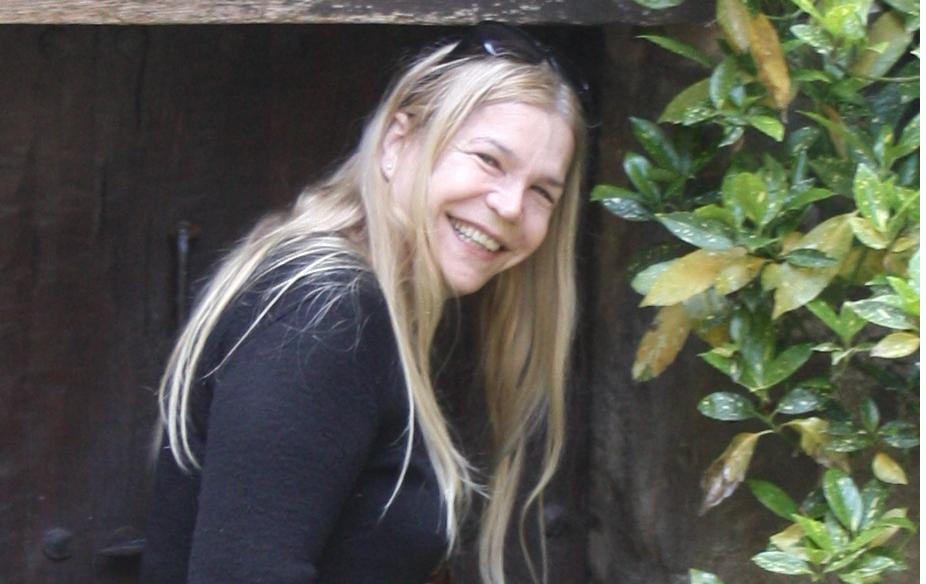
- Casas in 2010
- Born: August 27, 1959 (age 66); Adrogue, Buenos Aires, Argentina
- Education: Universidad de Buenos Aires
- Occupation: Lawyer

Mariana Federica Casas (born 27 August 1959) is an Argentine lawyer and activist notable for advancing transgender rights in Argentina. She is the first transgender lawyer in the country and the first openly transgender motorcycle racer globally. Casas has been pivotal in securing legal recognition of gender identity and is active in women's and LGBT rights movements.

== Early life and education ==
Casas was born in Adrogué into a middle-class family of Spanish (father) and Swiss (mother) descent. Assigned male at birth, her gender identity did not align with her assigned sex. During her youth, her parents, concerned for her mental well-being, subjected her to psychological interventions.

She studied law at the University of Buenos Aires, graduating in 2001.

== Legal career and activism ==
In February 2002, Casas filed her first lawsuit seeking legal recognition of her gender identity by Argentine authorities. After eighteen months, the court ruled in her favor—an early legal triumph for the transgender rights movement in Argentina.

From that moment forward, she dedicated her practice to assisting transgender individuals in obtaining name and gender marker changes. As part of the legal team for the Federación Argentina de Lesbianas, Gays, Bisexuales y Trans, she worked on the amparo leading to the legal name recognition of Florencia de la V.

Casas also served as legal advisor to the National Institute Against Discrimination, Xenophobia and Racism (INADI) in its Discrimination Assistance and Counseling Unit until August 2011, after which she joined the National Council of Women under the Ministry of Social Development.

By 2010, Casas had successfully defended the gender identity rights of 24 trans women and one trans man. That same year, her legal team at FALGBT successfully obtained the first legal gender and name change without the requirement of surgery.

She contributed to El Teje, the first trans-focused publication in Latin America produced by the Ricardo Rojas Cultural Center and its Gender Communication and Technology area. Additionally, she represented Claudia Pía Baudracco, coordinator of the Argentine Association of Travestis, Transsexuals and Transgenders (ATTTA).

== Motorcycling ==
Casas began riding motorcycles at age 13 and later worked for 17 years as a motorcycle courier.

In 2019, she became the first transgender woman to compete in Argentina’s Moto 3 Femenil category, placing second in her debut race aboard a violet Honda Twister 250. She continues to participate in races and advocates for greater cultural acceptance of trans athletes.

== Contributions and legacy ==
Casas played a key role in drafting Argentina’s landmark Gender Identity Law, enacted in 2012.

She co-authored the book Persona, derecho y libertad, written in tribute to Professor Carlos Fernández Sessarego.

Through her legal advocacy, literary contributions, and athletic achievements, Casas has been a formative figure for transgender rights and anti-discrimination efforts in Argentina.

== Selected works and media ==
- Contributor to El Teje, the first transgender newspaper in Latin America.
- Co-author of the book Persona, derecho y libertad.
- Speaker on legal aspects of gender identity and human rights.

== See also ==
- Gender identity
- Carla Antonelli
- Tamara Adrián
