= Fundación Ama Amoedo =

Non-profit arts foundation based in Uruguay

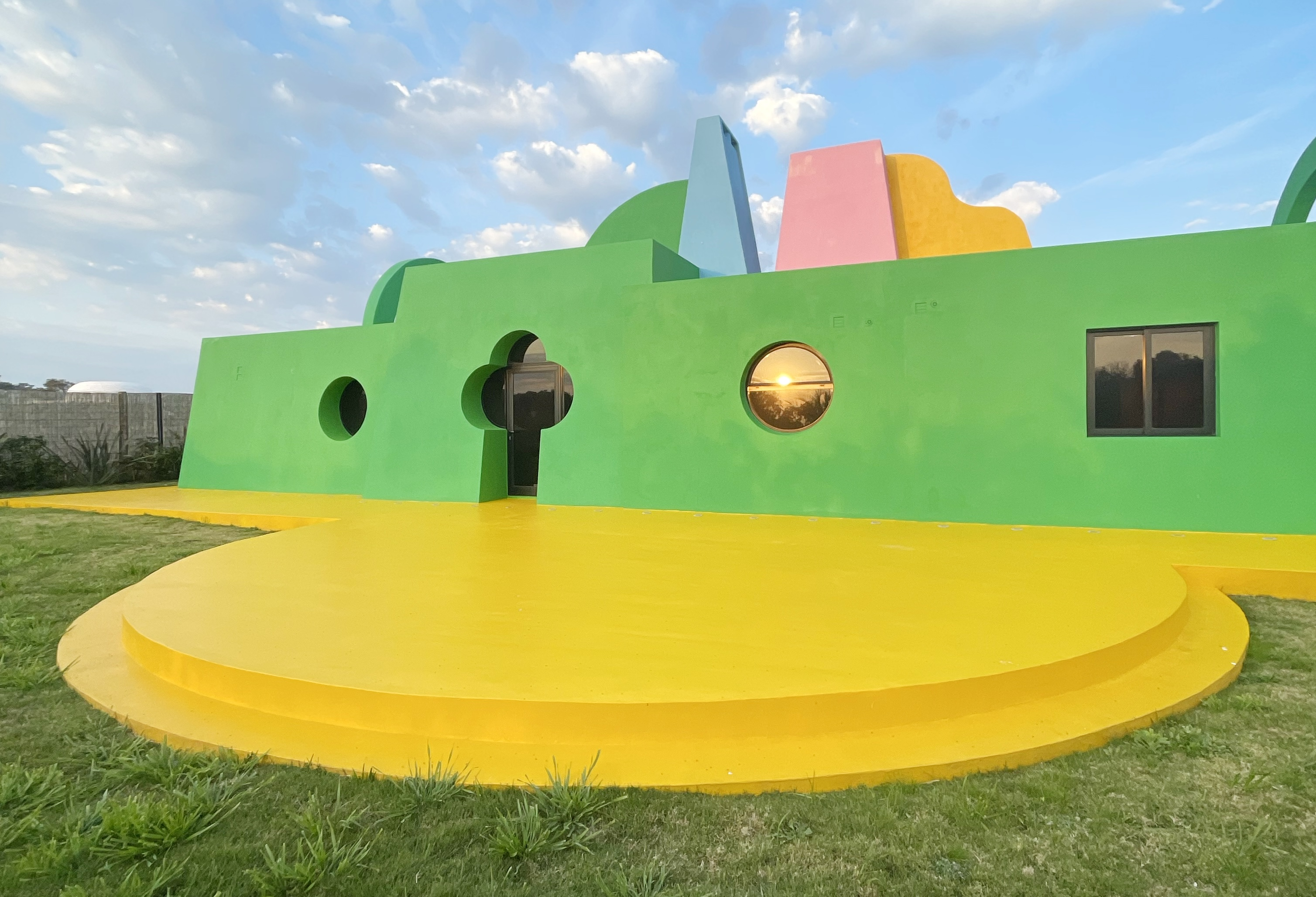
- Abbreviation: FAA
- Formation: 2021
- Founder: Amalia Amoedo
- Type: Philanthropic non-profit organization
- Headquarters: José Ignacio, Uruguay
- Website: fundacionamaamoedo.org

Fundación Ama Amoedo (FAA) is a non-profit organization established in 2021 by collector and philanthropist Amalia Amoedo, following more than twenty-five years of activity as a patron and collector. Its mission is to promote the visibility of Latin American artists and strengthen their presence within the global art field.

Amoedo comes from a family of art collectors and has supported Latin American art since the 1990s. In 2021, she formalized her long-standing patronage through the creation of the foundation. The organization seeks to expand dialogue and networks among the arts of Latin America, the Caribbean, and the diaspora, collaborating with both local and international institutions. “The Foundation’s initiatives translate and give structure to actions I had been developing for years, independently and as a philanthropist,” Amoedo said in an interview.

== Programs ==
Fundación Ama Amoedo runs grant and support programs, including the FAARA artist residency in José Ignacio, Uruguay. It also partners with international institutions such as Delfina Foundation (London), Casa Wabi (Mexico), The International Studio & Curatorial Program (New York), and Pivô (São Paulo), enabling artists from Argentina and Uruguay to participate in residencies abroad. Its annual grant program supports ten projects across four categories: artists, art and social engagement, organizations, and publications. The foundation also facilitates research travel for international curators and supports exhibitions worldwide, including projects by artists such as Marta Minujín.

== Casa Neptuna ==
Casa Neptuna, designed by Argentine artist Edgardo Giménez, serves as the foundation's residency space in Uruguay. Conceived as a playful structure in bright colors, it is intended to foster creativity among its residents. Located near both the Atlantic Ocean and José Ignacio's native forest, it provides a setting conducive to concentration and artistic work. Casa Neptuna was featured in Homes of Our Time 3 (Taschen), which also includes the building in its compendium Contemporary Houses Around the World.

== Collection ==
The Ama Amoedo Collection comprises works of contemporary Argentine and Latin American art. Its holdings—more than 650 works in total—include significant examples of twentieth-century visual art, such as pieces of concrete and abstract art from the 1940s, pop art associated with the Instituto Di Tella in the 1960s, and works by artists who emerged during the 1980s and 1990s. Continuing to grow, the collection incorporates new narratives and artistic practices from across the region. It has loaned works to international exhibitions and institutions including the Venice Biennale (Italy), the Jewish Museum (New York), The Drawing Center, the Institute of Contemporary Art, Miami (United States), Copenhagen Contemporary (Denmark), the Instituto Tomie Ohtake (Brazil), and in Argentina, the Museo Nacional de Bellas Artes, the Museo de Arte Moderno de Buenos Aires, the Colección AMALITA, and the Malba.
