= María Belén Correa =

Argentine trans activist

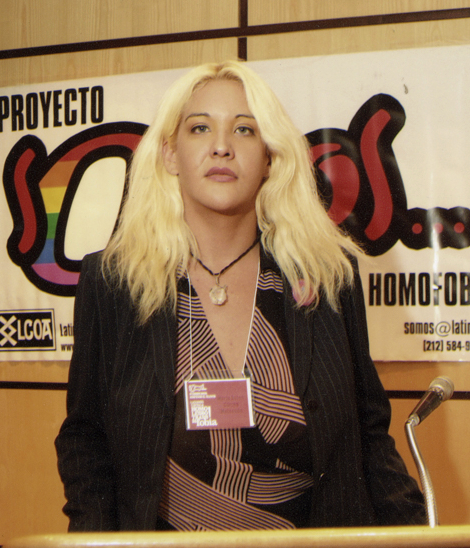
- María Belén Correa at a Latino Commission on AIDS conference in New York, 2004.
- Born: 25 June 1973 (age 53); Luján Partido, Argentina
- Occupations: Activist; archivist
- Years active: 1993–present
- Known for: One of the pioneers of the Argentine trans rights movement and founder of several organizations, including the Archivo de la Memoria Trans.

María Belén Correa (born 25 June 1973) is an Argentine trans rights activist. In 1993, together with Claudia Pía Baudracco and other activists, she co-founded the Asociación de Travestis Argentinas (ATA; English: "Association of Travestis of Argentina"), later renamed Asociación de Travestis, Transexuales y Transgénero de Argentina (ATTTA; English: "Association of Travestis, Transsexuals and Transgender People of Argentina"), of which she was president from 1995 to 2001. The emergence of ATTTA was pioneering, as it not only kick-started the organized struggle for trans rights in Argentina but also became a crucial platform through which some of the most influential trans activists of the 1990s emerged and helped shape the country's broader LGBTQ movement.

Due to increasing police persecution, in 2001 Correa had to go into exile in New York and in 2004 she was officially granted political asylum in the U.S. During her exile in New York, she advanced her activism as co-founder of the Red Latinoamericana y del Caribe de Personas Trans (RedLacTrans; English: "Latin American and Caribbean Network of Trans People"), which brings together organizations from the region; collaborated in establishing Santamaría Fundación in Colombia, of which she is a patroness; founded the TransEmpowerment NY project, a Manhattan-based harm reduction center for LGBTQ individuals with drug addictions; and created Mateando, New York City's first group for LGBTQ Argentines and Uruguayans, under the Latino Commission on AIDS and the SOMOS program. In 2008, Correa moved to Madrid, Spain, and a year later to Hanover, Germany, where she has settled permanently since then.

Despite her exile, Correa has consistently upheld her commitment to activism in Argentina, regularly visiting the country and synchronizing her schedule and professional endeavors with those of her home country. In 2012, she founded the Archivo de la Memoria Trans (AMT; English: "Trans Memory Archive") shortly after the death of Baudracco, with whom she had conceived the project. A pioneering endeavor, the community archive amis to act as a collective memory for Argentine trans identities, ensuring that their frequently silenced stories are preserved and made widely accessible to the community. The archive comprises over 25,000 items documenting the lives of trans individuals in Argentina, gaining national and international recognition for its role in disseminating materials through exhibitions and publications, as well as for its activist efforts. In addition to her work as director of the AMT, in 2019 Correa founded Cosmopolitrans, a project focused on helping trans migrants to Germany.

== Life and career ==
=== 1973–2001: Early life and ATTTA ===
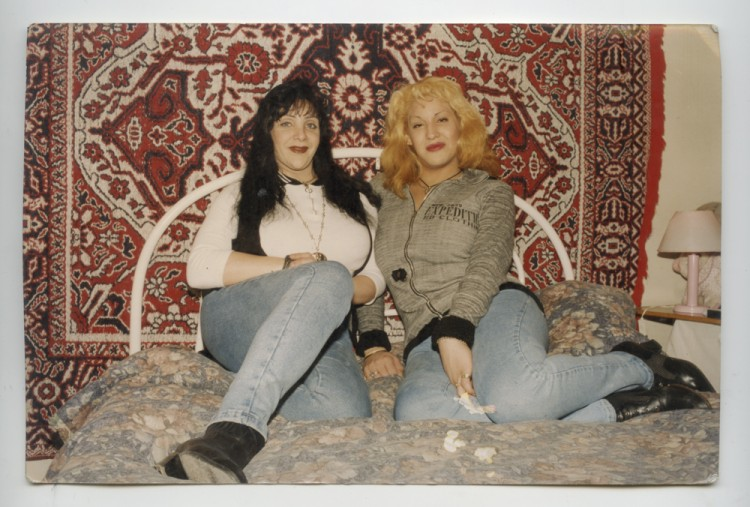
Correa with friend and fellow activist Claudia Pía Baudracco in Buenos Aires, 1993.

María Belén Correa was born on 25 June 1973 in a small town in the partido of Luján, Buenos Aires Province, Argentina. At the age of 16, she escaped from the restrictive environment of her hometown and moved to the capital Buenos Aires, which allowed her to begin to start expressing her gender identity. In the city, Correa turned to sex work, one of the few options available to travestis and trans women (a term not yet common in Argentina) in the early 1990s, who faced brutal police persecution for their gender expression despite the country's return to democracy in 1983. The emblem of the persecution and repression of trans people were the police edicts (Spanish: edictos policiales), through which the state delegated to the security forces the task of repressing acts not foreseen in the criminal code. In particular, the trans community of Buenos Aires was criminalized through edicts that punished individuals dressed in "clothing of the opposite sex" and those who "publicly incited or offered themselves to carnal acts", which were established in 1949 and remained in force for almost half a century, being applied indistinctly in dictatorial and democratic periods. This meant that trans people could be arbitrarily detained, locked up and often tortured and extorted without any guarantees, for simply walking down the street.

In mid-1992, Correa met Claudia Pía Baudracco, a few years her senior and a prominent figure within the trans community known for fiercely confronting police persecution, with whom she built a deep bond of friendship and activism in the years that followed. Some time later, with her family's help, Correa rented her own apartment in Palermo under the guise of pursuing studies—a significant achievement as most travestis were confined to hotels or boarding houses, and Baudracco moved in with her soon after. Baudracco, having lived in Italy where trans women could move freely and rectify their gender registration, helped foster among her peers the conviction that they possessed rights worth fighting for. On 25 June 1993, Baudracco threw a birthday party for Correa at her apartment, but the mood shifted when two invited guests failed to show, having been detained by the police. What began as a celebration quickly turned into an urgent conversation about improving conditions for their community and led to the founding of the Asociación de Travestis Argentinas (ATA). Writing in 2025, Correa explained the origin of ATA's name: "... we didn't choose the name—it was given to us by the police. A few days earlier, we'd gone shopping, and as we returned to the apartment, police were waiting at the door; they knew where we lived, stopped us, and tried to arrest us. Back then, our clothing singled us out: high heels, miniskirts—though that day we were all wearing pants. We refused, started arguing, and then one of them said, 'But who are you people?! Are you from the Argentine Travesti Association?' At the impromptu meeting in my house, one of the girls jokingly suggested it should be our name, and soon it didn't seem so funny—it felt necessary, like that had to be exactly what our group was."

The founding of ATA, later renamed Asociación de Travestis, Transexuales y Transgénero de Argentina (ATTTA; English: "Association of Travestis, Transsexuals and Transgender People of Argentina"), marked the beginning of Correa's activism, as well as the starting point for the organized trans rights movement in Argentina, bringing together some of the most influential activists and carrying out the main actions of the decade. According to Correa, they "became activists without realizing it", and "were seen as crazy" even within the trans community, as they were few in number and marked by the police. During those years, trans activists began to articulate their demands with the gay and lesbian movements, since both had in common the concern for police persecution. Interviewed in 2008, Correa recalled: "At that time, we were bringing a different reality to the one they had. They were with the civil union, and we were saying we can't live, we can't walk, we can't go to the supermarket. That's literally how things were."

=== 2001–2009: Exile in New York and Germany ===
In 2000, Correa was interviewed by a women's magazine in a feature that, rather than focusing on her activism, introduced her family and showcased her childhood home. This caused the police threats Correa faced due to her activism to extend to her family, ultimately leading to her decision to go into exile in New York City in November 2001. In December 2004, the Immigration court number 26 of New York granted Correa political asylum in the United States, in a decision by federal judge Barbara Nelson. Following the announcement of the ruling, the Comunidad Homosexual Argentina (CHA; English: "Argentine Homosexual Community") publicly stated that the decision was significant, marking "the first time in history that political asylum has been granted to a travesti activist." CHA president César Cigliutti emphasized that the ruling recognized the persecution faced by the activist in Argentina due to her advocacy, adding: "This decision highlights the current state of marginalization and violence endured by travestis. While the city has enacted civil unions and advanced rights for gays and lesbians, the treatment of the travesti population has been entirely different. A Contravention Code was passed that targets and criminalizes them. They are virtually forced into sex work, face imprisonment by police, and experience heightened violence when they engage in activism."

Since then, Correa has not returned to live permanently in Argentina but has maintained consistent contact and continued her activist work in the country, while in numerous interviews she has described the profound impact that exile has had on her life. She stated in a 2024 interview: "No matter how much I'm in another country, speaking another language, and living millions of kilometers away, I never fully detach from what I left behind; that's the difference between being a migrant and an exile, especially when you leave without wanting to go—a migrant is someone who plans their departure, sells their things, and is eager for an experience or some reason, while an exile is someone who has to decide in 10, 15 days, or even less, to leave because they're in danger, and they go without wanting to." Correa's exile also underscored the broader reality faced by many non-activist trans women of that era and earlier, who were compelled to seek exile to live openly without fear of police persecution. Writing for elDiarioAR in 2023, she explained: "Leaving when you plan it as a hopeful future is not the same as leaving because your life is in danger. That’s what happened to me in 2001, when I fled persecution by the Argentine state. Police edicts, contravention codes, and misdemeanor codes enabled the persecution of the trans population without judicial oversight, under the pretext of addressing situations allegedly threatening social coexistence. In practice, they served only to unleash discriminatory biases and corruption, resulting in the near-total annihilation of an entire generation of trans people." In the same article, she described her exile years in the U.S. as those "when I suffered the most from exile; that pain that only those who left without wanting to do so feel."

In 2004, while exiled in New York, Correa co-founded the Red Latinoamericana y del Caribe de Personas Trans (RedLacTrans; English: "Latin American and Caribbean Network of Trans People") with Mexican trans activist Paty Betancourt. With the support from ATTTA, both activists attended an International Lesbian and Gay Association (ILGA) conference, where they created a communication channel exclusively for trans people, in an era before social media. This enabled organizations in Latin America and the Caribbean to join and collaborate, laying the foundation for RedLacTrans, which had Argentina, Mexico, Brazil, Chile and Colombia as its first member countries. Also in 2004, Correa collaborated in establishing Santamaría Fundación in Colombia, of which she is a patroness. During this time, she came into contact with the term "trans", which was well-known in the U.S. but not yet in Latin American activism. In a 2022 interview, she explained: "In 2001, I met Sylvia Rivera in New York. I didn't know who she was, but we started talking at a gathering because she spoke to me in Spanish. When she died in 2002, it was on the news, and I realized why—because at that moment, people in activism were rediscovering her and she was being widely honored. There was a photo circulating where Sylvia was seen holding a sign that said, 'Respect Trans People'. In the United States, or at least in New York where I was living, the word trans had no translation (...) Through RedLacTrans and ATTTA, I began to spread the term I had learned with the slogan 'to stop having to undress ourselves', because if I say I'm a travesti, transexual, or transgender, I'm already telling you 'I wear a wig', 'I've had surgery', 'I have a vagina', or 'I have a penis', since depending on my classification, I'm telling you what my body is like. Why do I have to undress myself just by introducing myself? The term 'trans person' allowed us to stop undressing ourselves when stating our identity."

== See also ==
- LGBTQ culture in Argentina
- Transgender rights in Argentina
