= Parque de España =

Urban complex in Rosario, Argentina

Coordinates: 32°56′19.2″S 60°38′11.29″W

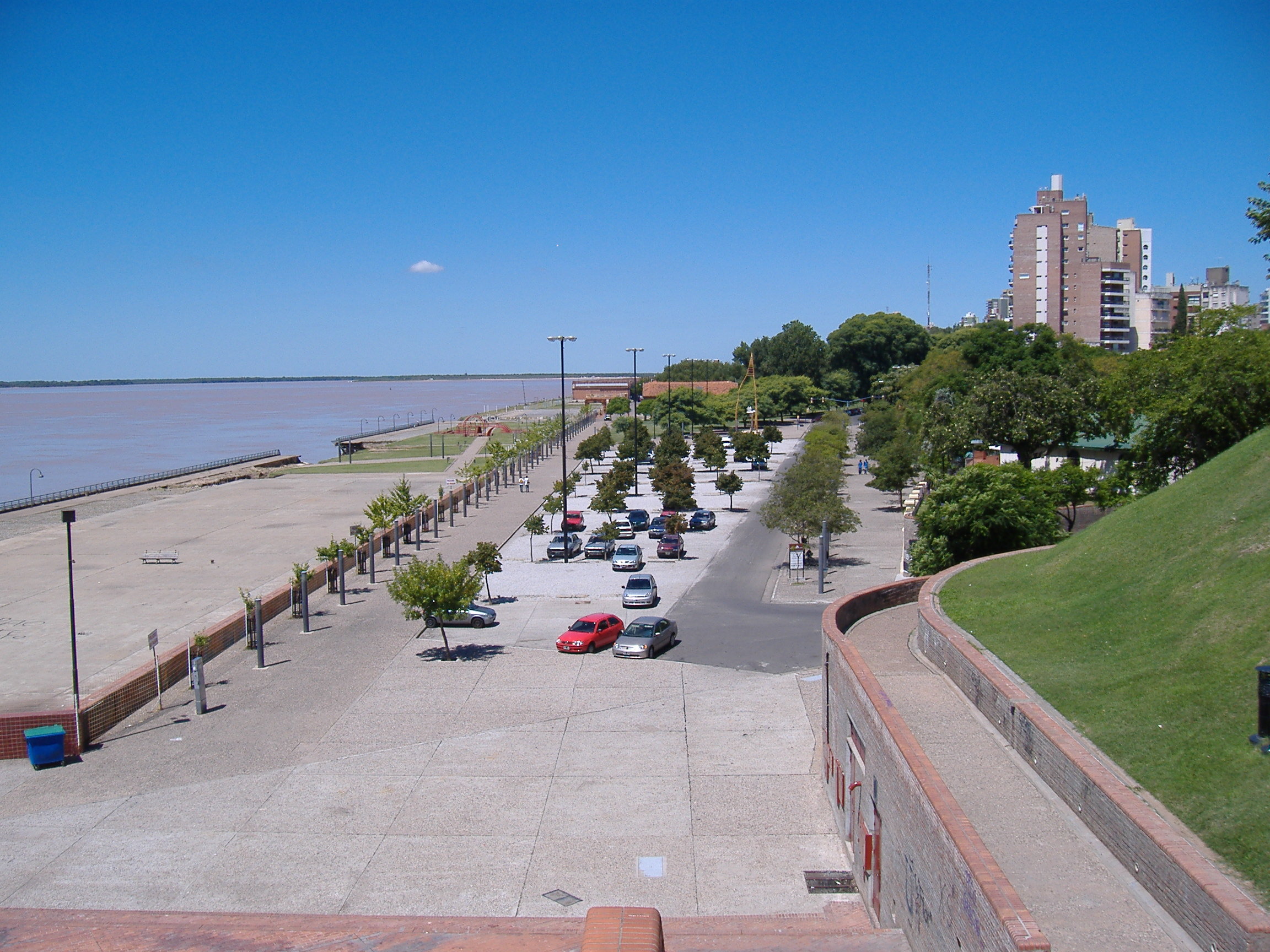
Parque de España, from the steps of the Cultural Center.

The Parque de España (Park of Spain) is an urban complex in Rosario, Argentina. It comprises the park and a cultural centre, with a total surface area of 10,000 m², located near the historical centre of the city, on the coast of the Paraná River.

The park follows the shoreline of the Paraná, with grass and trees, paved paths for pedestrians, and a large parking lot. The cultural centre, on the north of the complex, was in part projected by the Catalan urbanist Oriol Bohigas, and includes a 500-seat theatre, a conference room, three art exhibition galleries and a video library. The south facade of the building of the cultural centre is a set of outdoor stairs that climb meters from the lower level of the shore. The stairs themselves can seat up to 5,000 people for public shows performed in the park.

The complex includes a "partnership school," established by the Spanish Ministry of Education and Science and directed by Spanish civil servants. The school is property of the Parque de España Complex Foundation since May 25, 1993. There are basic and advanced courses, with a triple orientation (Humanities, Science-Technology and Business). Students of the school gain the appropriate subject equivalences in the Spanish educational system.

== History ==
The Spanish government funded the initiative to build a cultural center on lands granted by the Municipality of Rosario as part of the celebrations for the 500th anniversary of the first European landing in the Americas. The complex was inaugurated in November 1992 in the presence of Princess Cristina of Spain.

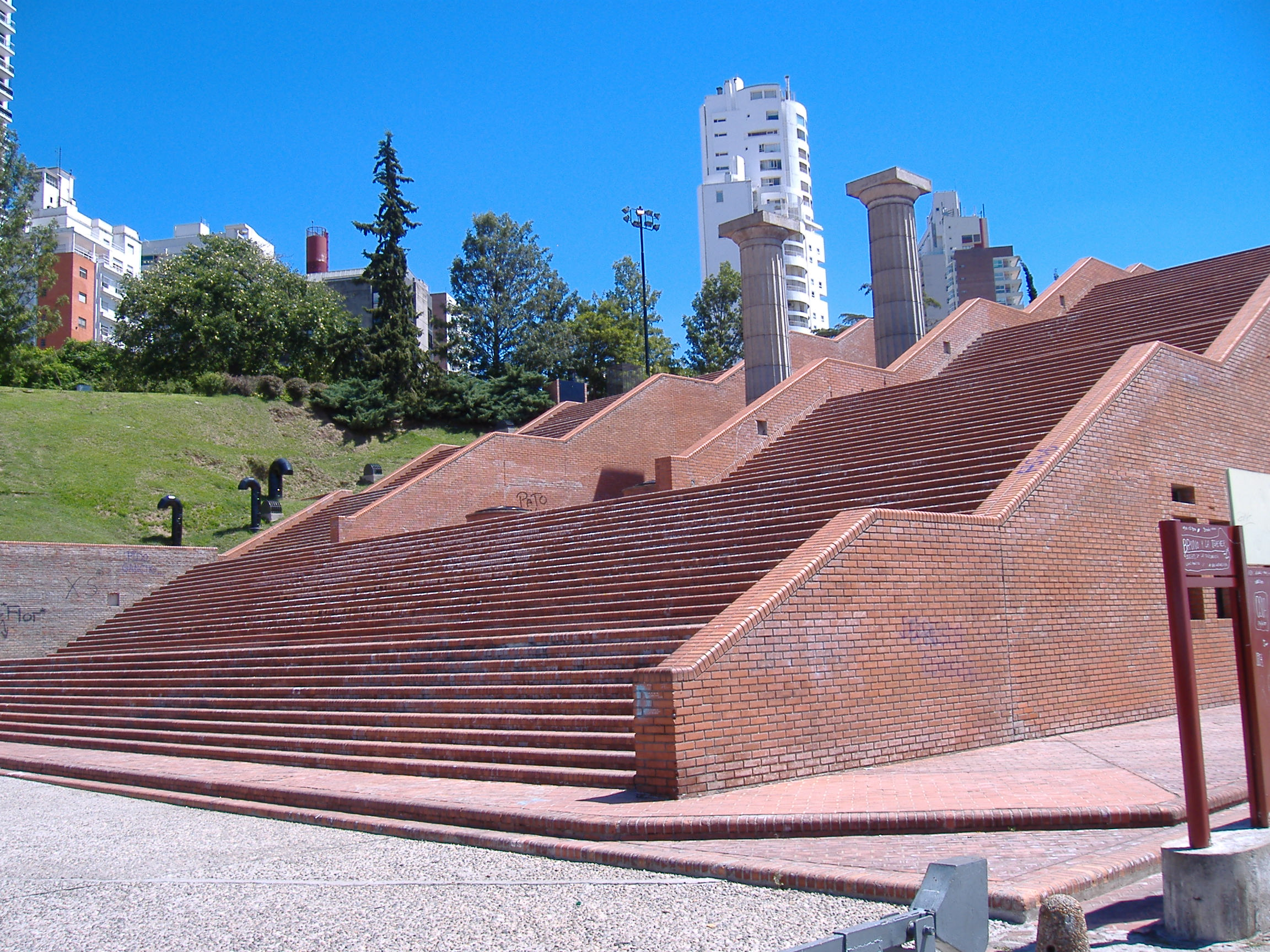
The Cultural Center

The complex was managed by a foundation formed by the Spanish government, the Municipality of Rosario and the Federation of Spanish Associations of the Province of Santa Fe. In 2002, by a new agreement, it was put in charge of the municipal government and the Spanish Agency for International Cooperation.

The cultural centre hosted some events of the Third International Congress of the Spanish Language, which took place in Rosario in November 2004.

== The 2005 collapse ==
On March 13, 2005, at 12:30 p.m., about 500 m² of the central section of the park (a 50-metre-long strip of the concrete-based, cobblestone-paved pedestrian path) collapsed into the ravine of the Paraná River. Four people fell into the river and received minor injuries. The municipality immediately closed off a large perimeter of the park, and three days later a judicial order shut off all the piers of the central part of Rosario's coastline.

President Néstor Kirchner promised to deliver 30 million pesos (about 10 million USD) of national funds for repairs, but the grant was delayed for almost two years. On February 27, 2007, the government announced a call for bids for the reconstruction of the piers, with an updated budget of AR$40 million (US$13 million).
