= Queer community archives =

Type of cultural heritage collection

Queer community archives are a subset of the larger body of community archives, which are archives and personal collections maintained by community groups who desire to document their cultural heritage based on shared experiences, interests, and/or identities. As such, queer community archives are collections that exist to maintain the historical record of the LGBT community and broader queer community. The term queer community archives, also called gay and lesbian archives, refers to a diverse array of community projects, organizations, and public institutions that maintain these histories.

== Background and context ==
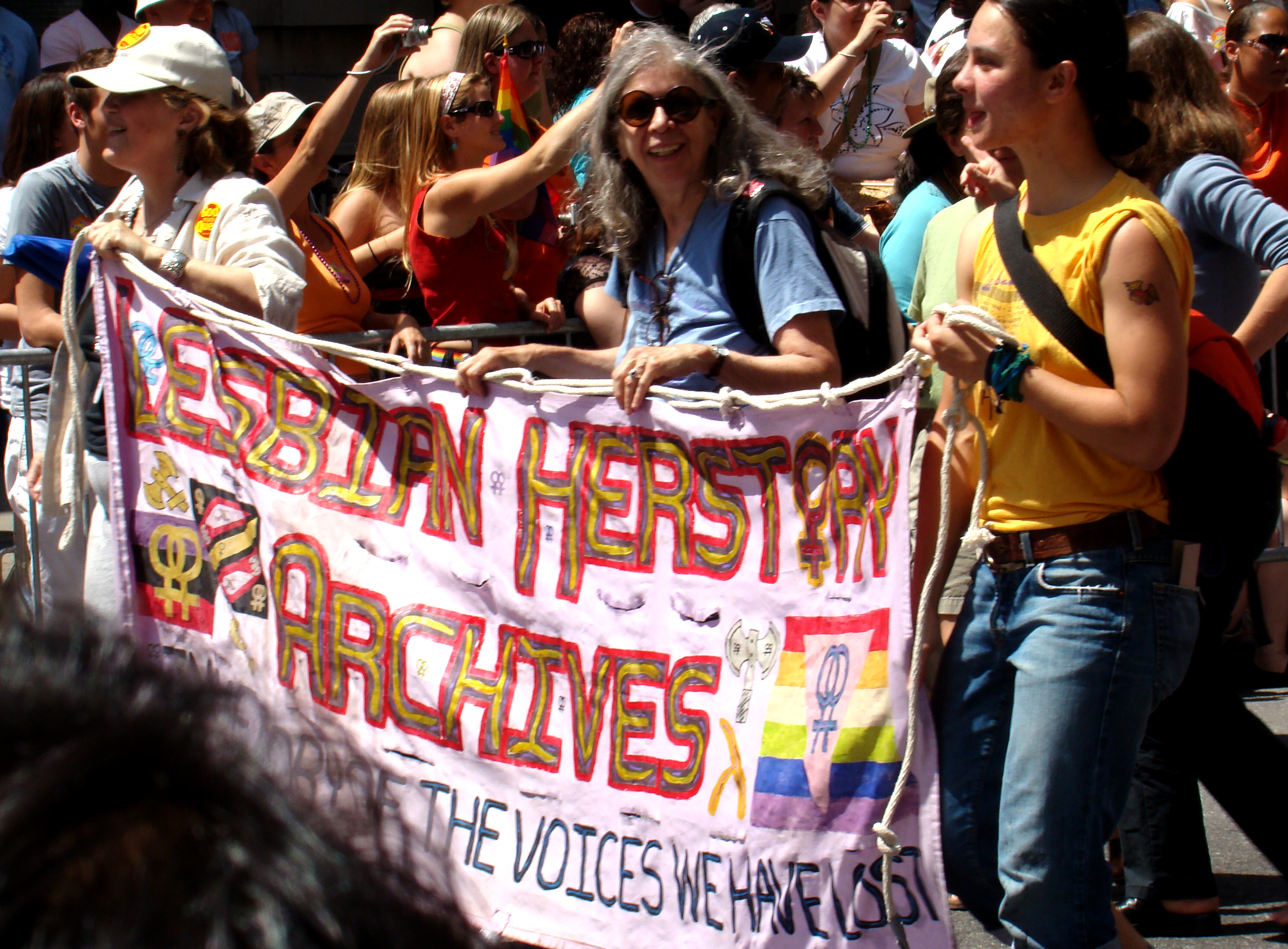
Volunteers of the Lesbian Herstory Archives holding a banner during the 2007 Pride March in New York City.

As a movement, community archives are characterized by their desire to document histories not collected or recognized by mainstream archival institutions. They involve communities collecting, preserving, and sharing materials which they deem to be significant in ways that are not necessarily subject to professional oversight or located in formal institutional settings. More specifically, community archives have been defined as projects initiated and maintained by a community group, that is a nonprofit organization or voluntary group operating with and for the benefit of their community in which materials are collected and preserved. These community groups, organizations, and institutions may function autonomously or in collaboration with other groups including archivists and heritage professionals.

Community archives, and specifically queer community archives, are characterized by at least a degree of separation and autonomy from mainstream archives and an explicit intention to rectify absences and misrepresentations in mainstream collections and institutions due to lack of collecting certain groups' records. This is a form of archival activism, and studies have shown that these archives are as valuable and even more valuable to the public than mainstream collections. Activist archives are also called interference archives. Less important than a queer community archives’ position inside/outside of official institutions is a commitment to the wider strategy of promoting visibility, equal rights, social respect, and cultural space for 2SLGBTQ+ people.

The majority of queer community archives in North America are independent community based groups or initiatives of 2SLGBTQ+ associations with broader missions, but also exist as dedicated institutions or as privately housed personal collections. There are approximately 50 publicly accessible queer community archives globally, with approximately 30 of these located in the United States, 15 in Europe, 5 in Canada, 2 in Mexico, 1 in Australia, and 1 in South Africa. These figures include stand alone 2SLGBTQ+ archives and libraries, as well as distinct and substantial collections maintained within 2SLGBTQ+ organizations and community centers whose sole mission is not archiving.

Queer community archives have been foundational to and preceded the development of lesbian and gay studies and queer studies in western universities, while retaining their relevance as centers of support for community organizing, public history work, activism, cultural production, and popular education beyond the university setting. These archives welcome diverse audiences from researchers to activists, and cultural producers to the simply curious general public.

== Relationship to mainstream archives ==
Since queer community archives were created from the commitment of many volunteers, activists, and archivists in order to collect and protect materials that were unwanted by university, public, and government archives, those responsible for maintaining community archives tend to mistrust mainstream archives. Mainstream archives often use language and terminology that does not reflect the way queer people and communities refer to themselves, and queer community archives also give queer people a way to control the language used to describe them in archives. The desire for autonomy and independence comes with obstacles. Primarily, due to a lack of funding, there is a dependence on significant personal sacrifice, be that financial, physical or mental on behalf of key activists and a network of volunteers whose commitments arise from great emotional and political investment in queer community archives and their impact.

For example, the Lesbian Herstory Archives (LHA) in Brooklyn value their autonomy and long-term sustainability above access to some or any public funds. Financial problems experienced by both the International Gay and Lesbian Archives and ONE Inc. convinced the two collections to merge in 1995, becoming the ONE National Gay & Lesbian Archives. However, the ONE National Gay & Lesbian Archives were not maintained by a traditional archivist until two decades after this transition. Because of the general lack of professional oversight, queer community archives adopt a range of approaches not always seen in formal and mainstream archives and while it is true that many queer community archives are primarily concerned with use and access, this does not equate to failing the long-term preservation of materials.

== Origins ==
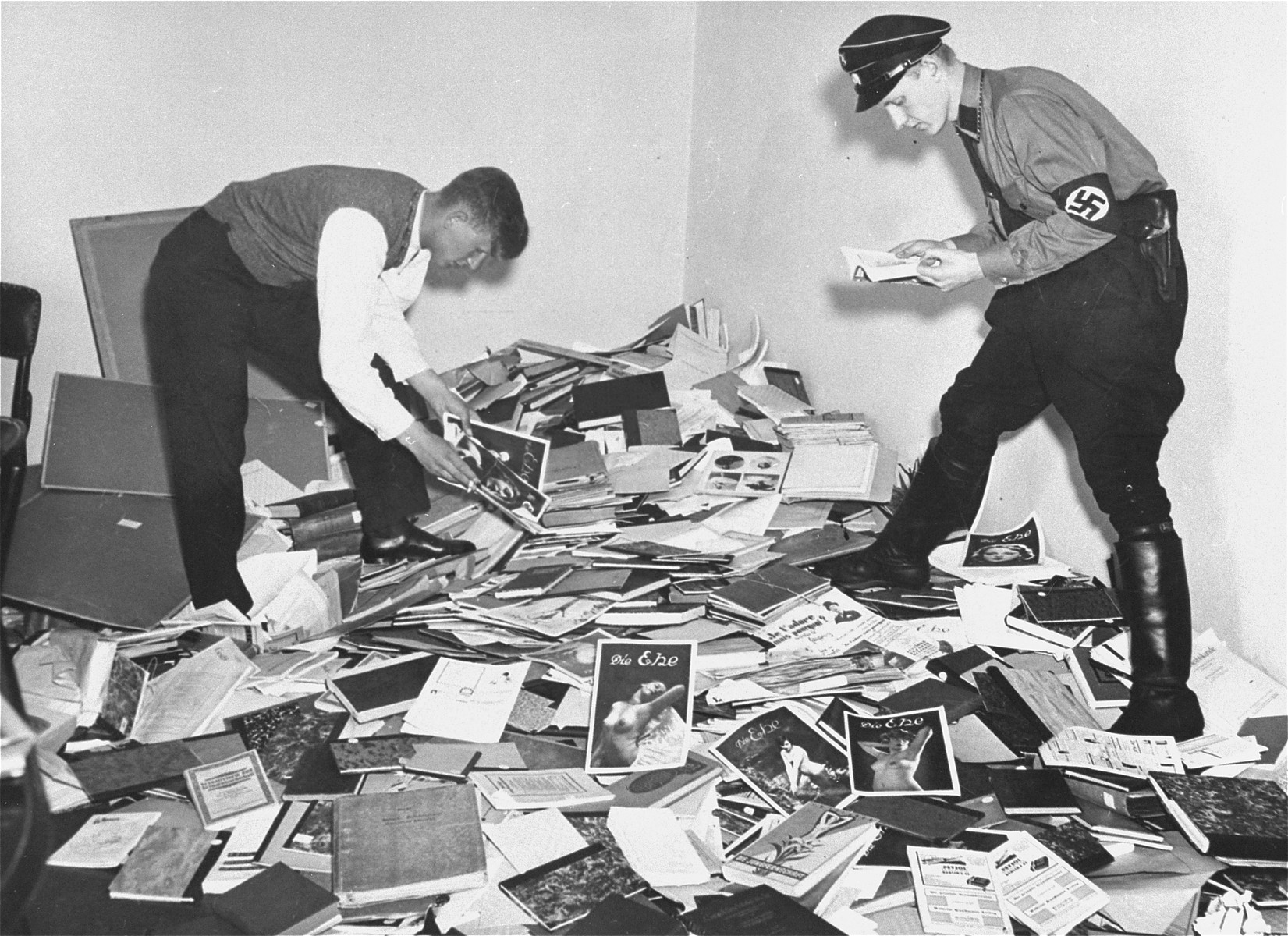
The Nazi Party plunder the library of Dr. Magnus Hirschfeld, Director of the Institute for Sexual Research in Berlin. The materials were loaded onto trucks and carted away for burning. The public library of the Institute comprised approximately 10,000 mostly rare German and foreign books on the topics of sex and gender.

Dedicated queer community archives originated within and are considered an outgrowth of the gay liberation movement of the 1960s and 1970s, when the first groups, organizations, and institutions solely committed to maintaining such collections were formed.

The following archives are outgrowths of the gay liberation period:

- The Canadian Gay and Lesbian Archives (now called The ArQuives) were formed in Toronto in 1973.
- The Lesbian Herstory Archives were formed in Brooklyn in 1973.
- The Australian Queer Archives were formed in Melbourne in 1978.
- The National Gay and Lesbian Archives were formed in Los Angeles in 1979.

A small number of earlier queer community organizations with libraries or archives had emerged from the homosexual emancipation movement in Europe before World War II and from the homophile movement in Europe and North America in the late 1940s to mid-1960s:

- The Institut für Sexualwissenschaft (Institute for Sexual Science) was founded in Berlin in 1919.
  - Founded by homosexual-emancipation and transgender-emancipation pioneer and world-renowned sexologist Dr. Magnus Hirschfeld, the institute included a library of some 12,000 volumes along with research collection of archives and artifacts; it was destroyed in 1933 at the beginning of the Nazi Regime.
- The Scientific-Humanitarian Committee (Netherlands Branch) was formed in 1912.
  - This organization amassed a library of over 4,000 queer books, before it was destroyed during the Nazi Occupation of the Netherlands. The catalogue is still available since it was published before the Nazi raid in 1940. The International Homo/Lesbisch Informatiecentrum (IHILA) has worked to reconstitute this lost library.
- The Culture en Ontspannings Centrum (COC Nederland) was formed in Amsterdam in 1946.
  - This social advocacy group maintained an extensive archive and library before donating the materials to IHLIA in 1980.
- ONE, Inc. was formed in Los Angeles in 1952.
  - This organization initially focused on publishing a national magazine for homosexuals and by 1954 began developing a library and archives, which now form part of the holdings of the ONE National Gay & Lesbian Archives.

In addition to the above organizations, LGBT historian and founding member of the GLBT Historical Society Gerard Koskovich notes that it is likely that some of the other homophile organizations scattered around the United States from the mid-1950s to mid-1960s also maintained small archival holdings, but that research to establish this has yet to be done.

Political activism, community empowerment, and social change were all motivating factors underpinning these community-based archival efforts. The above listed collections and the queer community archives that have been instated since began because pioneering individuals and/or communities saw a lack of representation in their local archives and public libraries and sought to redress this discrimination. These archives were founded as conscious, political acts vital for presenting their communities positively to the dominant culture of heteronormativity and homophobia, while preserving their history for future generations. While many individuals held private collections of personal papers and ephemera, individuals such as Gail Land, Jim Kepner, and Willie Walker acted as catalysts to bring these collections together to form queer community archives.

In recent years, the Archivo de la Memoria Trans (Spanish for: "Trans Memory Archive") of Argentina has had great international recognition and has influenced the proliferation of a number of similar archives focused on trans history in different Latin American countries.

== Methods ==
=== Organizational ===
Existing queer community archives reflect several models of structure, finance, administration and programming:

- The most observed organizational model for queer community archives are small archives and/or libraries in 2SLGBTQ+ organizations and/or community centers, where collections often reflect programming.
- Another prominent organizational model is that of non-profits devoted entirely to maintaining queer archives or libraries, such as The ArQuives and the Lesbian Herstory Archives.
- A third organizational model represents partnerships between traditional archives and LGBTQ+ organizations, in which communities are brought in to appraise material and solicit further donations.
- A fourth organizational model that has gained prominence in the 21st Century is the creation of dedicated special collections of 2SLGBTQ+ materials owned by university or municipal libraries, which in contrast to more independent organizational models, has consistent access to financing which allows for the acquisition of more material ensuring long-term preservation.

=== Collection practises ===
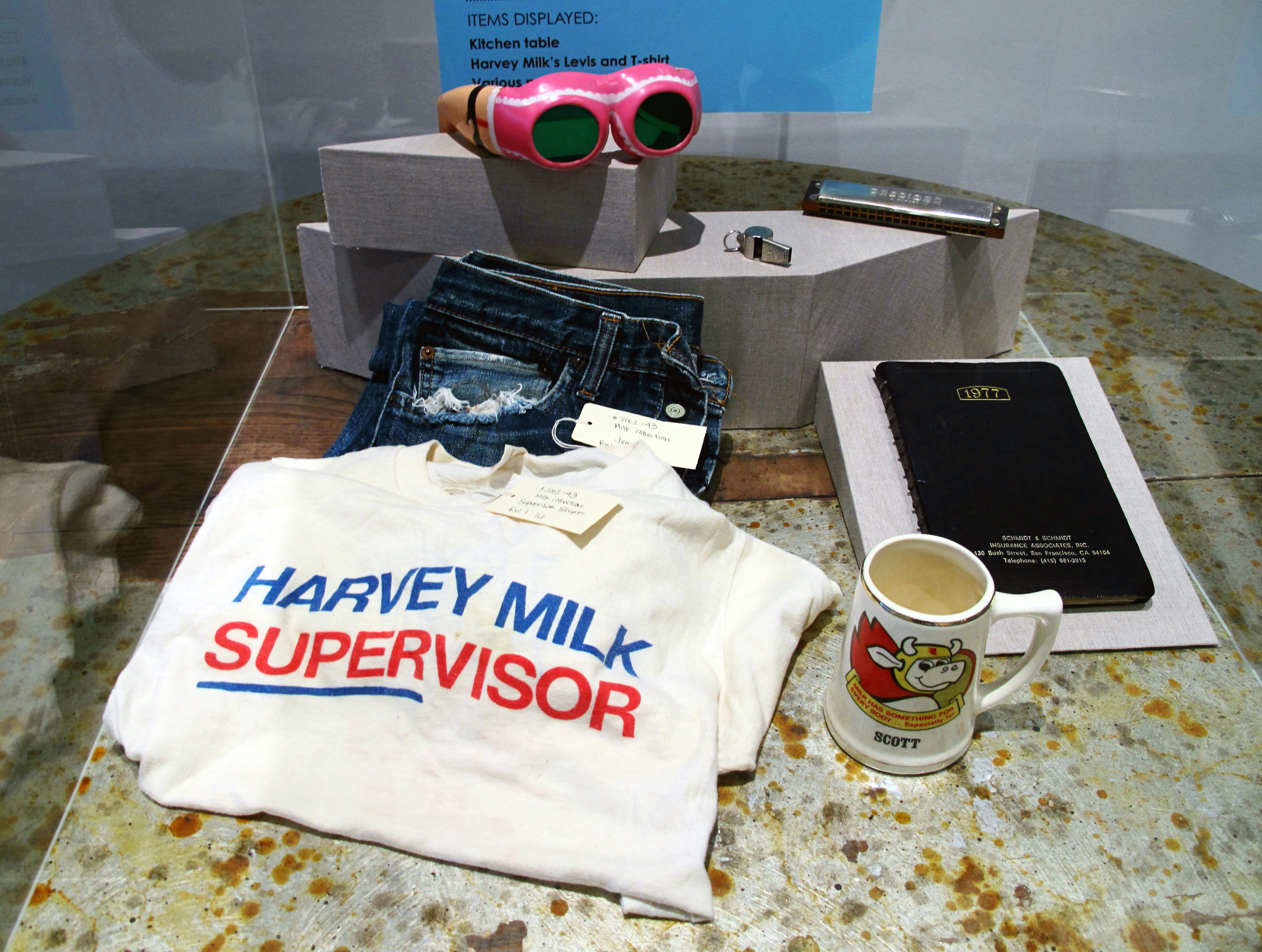
Personal belongings of Harvey Milk (1930-1978) on display during the preview of The GLBT History Museum in San Francisco's Castro District.

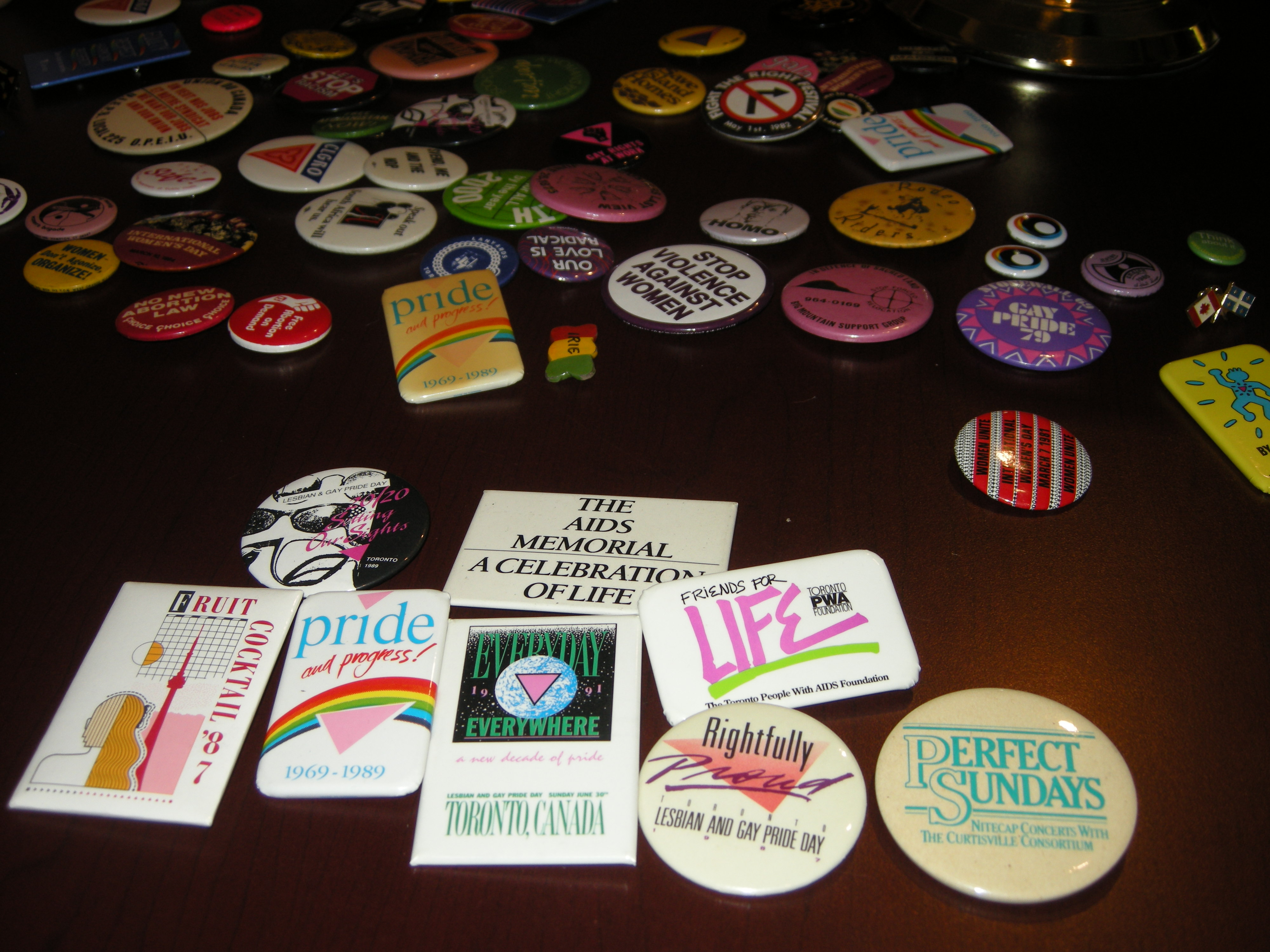
A sample of buttons from the Canadian Lesbian and Gay Archives, (now called The ArQuives) in Toronto, Canada.

Most queer community archives represent diverse interests and represent many facets of a diverse community, while a small number of collections are more focused, such as community archives which rose from lesbian feminism and archives dedicated to collecting materials specific to a subculture, such as the Leather Archives and Museum in Chicago.

Queer community archives are characterized by their unorthodox material, as they have accepted and continue to accept any material queer people decide is important to their history. Cultural theorist Ann Cvetkovich describes how traditional archives have difficulty documenting intimacy, love, sexuality, and activism; experiences fundamental to queer people.

Queer community archives gather traditional materials such as personal papers, organizational records, and other print materials but also collect non-traditional materials such as books, periodicals like newsletters and zines, textiles such as banners and imprinted t-shirts, sound recordings, film and video, artifacts such as buttons and sex toys, as well as graphic and fine art. Browsing The ArQuives digital collection reveals a vast diversity of materials in their possession, including condoms, puzzles, and dog tags. Oral history is a significant method in recovering queer history and is very common in queer community archives in the format of cassette tapes, audio files, and transcripts, especially those that document the histories of queer people of colour.

Since almost all material in these archives is from donation, they are examples of participatory archives in which collectives intentionally and actively shape their shared history. Because of the participatory nature of queer community archives, the contents of each is influenced by and reflects each community's particular interests.

Collections may be brought together physically or virtually. An example of a virtual queer community archive is the Digital Transgender Archives. The process of bringing together geographically scattered material into a digital collection is called "virtual reunification" and creates empowering views of communities that are dispersed, decentralized, and heavily marginalized even within their own social movements.

== Challenges ==
The growing visibility of community archives has provoked criticism from professional archivists, some of whom dismiss community archives due to their lack of professional oversight. Community archives are a compound of two contested terms. Describing these kinds of collections with the term "community" is criticized as the term is used in ill-defined ways by state bodies to denote otherness and separateness, while using the term "archive" to describe these activities has received dissenting professional voices who wish to maintain a strict and traditional definition of archives.

"Community archives" is a general term under which a host of different projects may fit, ranging from permanent registered nonprofit organizations to loosely defined, temporal configurations of community members seeking to preserve their history. The term community archives should be seen as an external description rather than emerging from within such community efforts.

In addition, queer community archives have largely emerged during a period of growing visibility of LGBTQ people in non-White communities. Queer community archives which developed without an explicit commitment and historical engagement with QTBIPOC (Queer and or Trans Black, Indigenous and People of Colour) communities may struggle to rectify and meaningfully engage with such communities outside of those of their White founders. For instance, Syrus Marcus Ware has critiqued The ArQuives in Toronto, Canada, for creating a "narrative of struggle and resistance that always begins with whiteness and that is used too often in the service of homonationalism".

Conversely, a number of queer community archives founded in the 1970s and 1980s have directly and critically engaged with questions of race, gender, class, diversity of sexual cultures, language, citizenship and immigration status, and issues of intersectionality. As Koskovich notes, some of the organizations which attempted to collect comprehensively "were committed to documenting the racial and ethnic diversity of LGBTQ communities. In practice, however, evidence of the experience of cisgender white gay men often constituted a majority of the collections, in part because systems of privilege meant that more such material had been produced and preserved in the first place."

Koskovich adds that "other community-based archives followed the model of the LHA, seeking to address such challenges by focusing specifically on underrepresented groups. Institutions in this category include the National Transgender Library and Archive, which Dallas Denny created as a personal collection in 1990 in Tucker, Georgia, then donated in 1993 to the American Educational Gender Information Service, which in turn transferred it to the Labadie Collection at the University of Michigan in 2000. Another example is the Historical Archive of the Latino GLBT History Project, started as a personal collection by José Gutierrez in Washington, D.C., in 1993 and incorporated as a nonprofit in 2007."
