= Dalia Al-Dujaili =

British writer and editor

- Born: Dalia Al-Dujaili; Surrey, England, UK
- Education: University of Edinburgh
- Years active: 2019–present
- Website: daliaaldujaili.com

Dalia Al-Dujaili is a British Iraqi writer, editor and curator. She is currently online editor of the British Journal of Photography (BJP). Her debut book Babylon, Albion was published in 2025.

== Early life and education ==
Al-Dujaili was born in a village in Surrey to Iraqi parents; her father Mohamad is half-Egyptian and studied in Leeds, while her mother Zainab fled Iraq in the late 1980s. She graduated in 2021 from the University of Edinburgh with a Scottish Master of Arts in English literature.

== Career ==
During university, Al-Dujaili entered the Edinburgh International Film Festival's journalism competition, through which she had her first review article about a documentary published in The Skinny. She also became Editor-in-Chief of a student publication called Mxgyny and started the newsletter Misfit. In 2020 during the COVID-19 lockdown, she founded the magazine The Road to Nowhere.

Upon graduating from university, Al-Dujaili was hired by the magazine It's Nice That to write articles on art and design. She became an editorial writer and digital editor at Azeema in 2021 and then community editor at Bricks in 2022. She also had a column in This Orient. In 2024, Al-Dujaili joined the BJP as Online Editor.

After embarking on a camping trip to the Lake District with Max Girardeaux's group The Visionaries, Al-Dujaili was inspired to create collages "placing British and Iraqi flora, mythic figures, and symbols side by side… threading her dual heritage into a single narrative arc". This developed into her debut non-fiction book Babylon, Albion, published in 2025 via Saqi Books. The book intersects the natural world and physical land of Britain and Iraq with her identity. Babylon, Albion was a Service95 Book Club recommendation.

Later in 2025, Al-Dujaili was commissioned by Galleria Gola in Milan to curate a contemporary Palestinian photography exhibition titled Ard: To Belong to Land.

== Bibliography ==
- Babylon, Albion (2025)
