= Claudia Pía Baudracco =

Argentine activist (1970–2012)

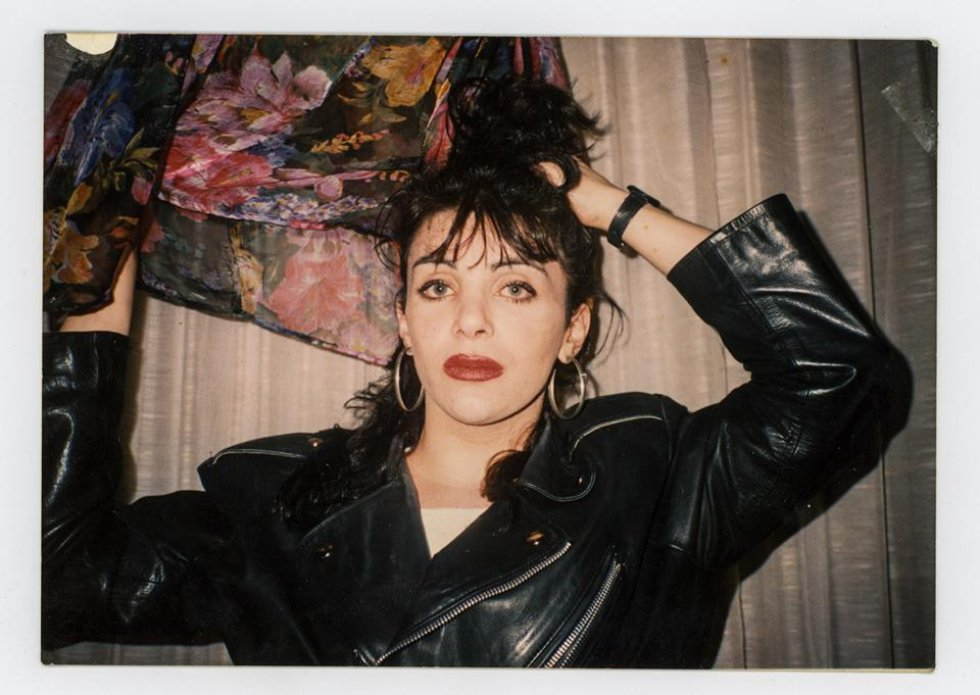
- Claudia Pía Baudracco in 1992
- Born: 22 October 1970; La Carlota, Argentina
- Died: 18 March 2012 (aged 41); Buenos Aires, Argentina
- Occupation: Activist
- Organization: FALGBT

Claudia Pía Baudracco (22 October 1970 – 18 March 2012) was an Argentine activist for the rights of women, sexual minorities, and LGBT people.

== Biography ==
Baudracco was born on 22 October 1970 in La Carlota, Córdoba Province. She spent her adolescence with her family in Venado Tuerto, and then moved to Buenos Aires.

Due to her gender identity, she suffered harassment and mistreatment and had to go into exile for several years, first in Uruguay and then in Europe.

== Activism ==
On 25 June 1993, Baudracco, together with María Belén Correa and other activists, founded the Association of Travestis of Argentina (Asociación de Travestis de Argentina) and was its coordinator until 1995. Later the organization would be called the Argentine Travesti Transsexual Transgender Association (Asociación Travestis Transexuales Transgéneros Argentinas; ATTTA). With the support of this organization, she would lead the movement for the repeal of the Códigos de Faltas in 15 provinces; these codes criminalized trans identities. The result was their repeal in several provinces.

Baudracco actively campaigned for approval of the Gender Identity Law, which gave trans people the right to have their name of choice and access to healthcare.

In September 2005, she was a founder and member of the board of directors of the Federación Argentina de Lesbianas, Gays, Bisexuales y Trans; FALGBT). In 2008, she conducted several prevention and research activities as a member of the Country Coordinating Mechanism of The Global Fund to Fight AIDS, Tuberculosis and Malaria, work she carried out with the Ministry of Health's Directorate of AIDS and Sexually Transmitted Diseases.

Claudia Pía Baudracco died at her home in Buenos Aires on 18 March 2012. She had gone without medical checkups for much of her life, and had been unable to take advantage of the healthcare provisions of the Gender Identity Law, as it was enacted shortly after her death.

== Day of the Promotion of the Rights of Trans People ==
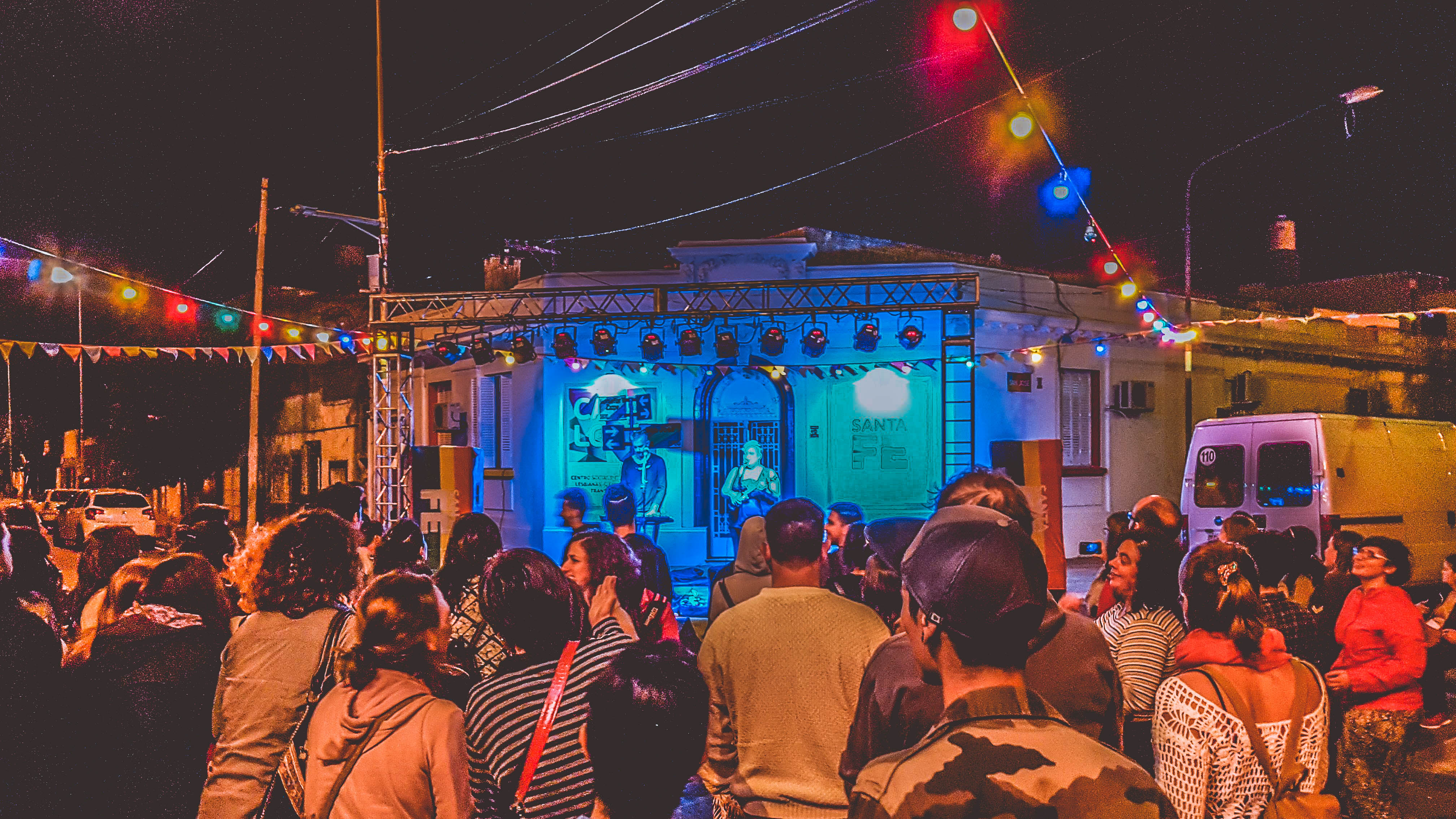
Cultural activities at Santa Fe's CASA LGBT for the 2018 Day of the Promotion of the Rights of Transgender People

In tribute to Claudia Pía Baudracco, the Buenos Aires City Legislature passed a law on 13 June 2013, designating 18 March, the day she died, as "Day of the Promotion of the Rights of Trans People". This was enacted on 15 July.

== Documentary ==
In 2015, a documentary film about her, Si te viera tu madre… Huellas de una leona (in English: If your mother could see you: Footprints of a lioness), directed by Andrés Rubiño and co-produced by Patricia Rasmussen of ATTA, was presented at the Buenos Aires Legislature's Salón Raúl Alfonsín.

== Recognitions ==
With the aim of establishing lines of discussion, intervention in public policies, and research on sexual diversity in Argentina and Latin America, FLACSO Argentina, the Undersecretariat of Sexual Diversity Policies of Santa Fe Province, and FALGBT created the Claudia Pía Baudracco scholarships for doctoral studies in social sciences.

In 2012, development began on the Archivo de la Memoria Trans. This is a project conceived by Baudracco and María Belén Correa, gathering materials such as photos, videos, and newspaper clippings to reconstruct an Argentine trans remembrance. In 2014, it organized a piece titled La construcción de una Líder at the FALGBT's headquarters, with photos, letters, and objects of Baudracco.

In 2013, the Claudia Pía Baudracco textile cooperative was formed in Mar del Plata, led by 14 trans women in the area, intended as an alternative to sex work.

In 2017, the Claudia Pía Baudracco Inclusive Health Center, Chubut Province's first such facility, was inaugurated in Comodoro Rivadavia.

== See also ==
- Mariana Casas
- María Rachid
- Diana Sacayán
- Transgender rights in Argentina
