= Travesti (gender identity) =

Gender identity term used in some Latin American countries

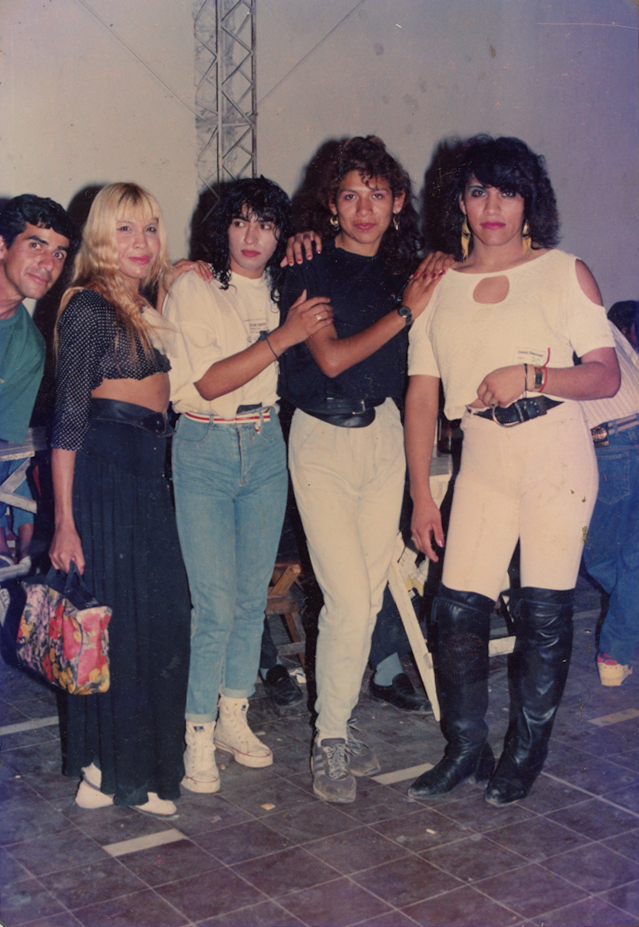
Travestis in Salta, Argentina, in 1988

Common in Latin America, the Portuguese and Spanish-language term travesti (Spanish: [tɾaˈβesti], Brazilian Portuguese: [tɾavesˈtʃi]) can either be used synonymously with the English transgender, or used to specifically designate people who were assigned male at birth and develop a feminine gender identity. Other terms have been invented and are used in South America in an attempt to further distinguish it from cross-dressing, drag, and pathologizing connotations. In Spain, the term was used in a similar way during the Franco era, but it was replaced with the advent of the medical model of transsexuality in the late 1980s and early 1990s, in order to rule out negative stereotypes. The arrival of these concepts occurred later in Latin America than in Europe, so the concept of travesti lasted, with various connotations.

The word "travesti", originally pejorative in nature, was reappropriated by Peruvian, Brazilian, and Argentine activists, as it has a regional specificity that combines a generalized condition of social vulnerability, an association with sex work, the exclusion of basic rights, and its recognition as a non-binary and political identity.

Travestis not only dress contrary to their assigned sex, but also adopt female names and pronouns and often undergo cosmetic practices, hormone replacement therapy, filler injections, and cosmetic surgeries to obtain female body features, although generally without modifying their genitalia nor considering themselves as women. The travesti population has historically been socially vulnerable and criminalized, subjected to social exclusion and structural violence, and discrimination, harassment, arbitrary detentions, torture and murder have been commonplace throughout Latin America. As a result, most travestis resort to prostitution as their only source of income, which in turn, plays an important role in their identity.

Travesti identities are heterogeneous and multiple, so it is difficult to reduce them to universal explanations. They have been studied by various disciplines, especially anthropology, which has extensively documented the phenomenon in both classical and more recent ethnographies. Researchers have generally proposed one of three main hypotheses to define travestis: that they constitute a "third gender" (like the hijras of India and the muxe of Mexico), that they reinforce the gender binarism of their society, or that they actually deconstruct the category of gender altogether. Although it is a concept widely used in Latin America, the definition of travesti is controversial, and it is still regarded as a transphobic slur depending on the context. Very similar groups exist across the region, with names such as vestidas, maricón, cochón, joto, marica, pájara, traveca, traveco, and loca, among others. (Note: The Spanish-language insults maricón, marica, joto and puto—among others—may be considered equivalents to the English-language slurs queer, faggot or sissy. Throughout this Wikipedia article, the use of these terms will remain unedited and untranslated, since they have been reappropiated as self-identification categories, and their genealogy and use often overlaps with those of travesti.)

Notable travesti rights activists include Argentines Lohana Berkins, Claudia Pía Baudracco, Diana Sacayán, Marlene Wayar, and Susy Shock; Erika Hilton from Brazil and Yren Rotela from Paraguay.

== Terminology ==
Despite being an emic concept widely used throughout the region, the definition of travesti is a source of controversy because it refers to heterogeneous and multiple identities, making it paradoxical to reduce the terms to universal explanations. Although it is a concept widely used in Latin America, the definition of travesti is controversial, and it is still regarded as a transphobic slur depending on the context.

The use of the term travesti was common in French in the early 19th century, from where it was imported into Portuguese with the same meaning. Transvestite (travesti in Spanish and Portuguese) gained usage in scientific and medical literature in the late 19th and early 20th centuries, followed by the terms "transsexual" and "transgender". The original use of travesti refers to the act of cross-dressing and became extended in the 1960s to refer to individuals who dressed as women as a performance or in their day-to-day lives. Its differentiation from the notions of "transsexual" and "trans woman" is complex and can vary depending on the context, ranging from considering it a regional equivalent to a unique identity.

Scholar Cole Rizki pointed out that "trans and travesti identifications are constantly shifting and should not be understood as mutually exclusive. The tensions between trans and travesti as identificatory categories are often untranslatable, leading us to ask what sorts of limitations and possibilities are embedded within the terms' distinctions and critical affinities." Writing for the Latin American Research Review in 2020, Joseph M. Pierce claimed that in Hispanic American countries, "as a general category, transgénero (transgender) or the more popular trans [...] refers to people who make identitarian, corporeal, and social efforts to live as members of the gender that differs from the normative sex that they were assigned at birth." Comparing it to the term travesti, he noted that:

in Argentina, Uruguay, and Chile, [travesti] refers most frequently to people assigned male sex at birth and who feminize their bodies, dress, and behavior; prefer feminine pronouns and forms of address; and often make significant bodily transformations by injecting silicone or taking hormonal treatments but do not necessarily seek sex-reassignment surgery. [...] ... the specific Latin American conceptual and identity marker travesti involves gender variance but not always gendered difference. While transgender, trans, and transsexual are terms that refer to changing gender and sex through legal, corporeal, or social mechanisms, a travesti may have been assigned "male" at birth but does not necessarily consider herself a woman (though some do). [...] For many travestis the term transgender depoliticizes a violent history of social and economic marginalization. The term travesti, in contrast, retains this class difference and popular resonance, and is thus a political, rather than a psychological, or even corporeal identification.

"While in English, transgender often needs to be modified in order to respond to local hierarchies of race, class, ability, and other forms of difference, travesti underscores instead the impossibility of such disarticulation in the first place. Nonetheless, travesti is not meant as a corrective to trans, (...) [but] as an identification, a critical analytic, and an embodied mode of politics."

— Cole Rizki, Transgender Studies Quarterly, May 2019.

According to Brazilian activist Amara Moira, the terms trans woman and travesti are synonymous, and many people use the former to avoid the negative connotations associated with the latter. The imposition of the transgender and transvestite categories by Anglo-American academics over travesti identities has been considered by some to be colonizing and westernizing in nature and has been met with resistance by the community. Originally used colloquially as a pejorative term, the travesti category has been reappropriated by Brazilian, Peruvian and especially Argentine activists since the 1990s, as it has a regional specificity that combines a generalized condition of social vulnerability, an association with sex work, the exclusion of basic rights and its recognition as a non-binary and political identity.

As they are stigmatized, excluded from the educational and labor system and reified as objects of theoretical criticism or media consumption, one of the main struggles of travesti activism since its emergence in the 1990s was the creation of their own political subjectivities. Argentine travesti activist Lohana Berkins pointed out in 2006:

We hold the travesti identity not only by resorting to linguistic regionalism, but also by circumstances and characteristics that make travestism a different phenomenon from North American and European transgenderism. In the first place, we travestis live different circumstances compared to those experienced by many transgenders from other countries, who (...) have the objective of rearranging themselves in the binary logic as women or men. A large part of Latin American travestis claim the option of occupying a position outside of binarism and it is our objective to destabilize the male and female categories. Second, the word transgenderism originated from theoretical works developed within the framework of the North American academy. In contrast, (...) the term travesti in Latin America comes from medicine and has been appropriated, reworked and embodied by travestis to call themselves. This is the term in which we recognize ourselves and that we choose to construct ourselves as subjects of rights. (...) The term "travesti" has been and continues to be used as a synonym for AIDS, thief, scandalous, infected, marginal. We decided to give new meanings to the word travesti and link it with struggle, resistance, dignity and happiness.

Despite its reappropriation by some as a political identity, in some places (especially Spain) travesti is still regarded as a transphobic slur, often used to invalidate people who prefer the terms transsexual or transgender. For example, in 2020 a Spanish journalist caused controversy and had to make a public apology after using the term to refer to late media personality La Veneno.

Although the use of the term travestismo is still common in Spanish, some contemporary authors reject it to avoid confusion with the practice of cross-dressing, as well as the use of the suffix -ism, which comes from the medical sciences and is considered pathologizing. In response to this, the use of the terms travestilidade (Portuguese) or travestilidad (Spanish) has become widespread in Brazilian academic literature since the 2000s and has been adopted by some Spanish-speaking authors, while others have opted for the words travestidad (roughly "travestity"), or transvestividad (roughly "transvestivity"). In the same way, the words travestimento and travestimiento (roughly "transvestiteness" or "transvestment") are used as an alternative to "transvestism", but to designate transformistas (i.e. drag performers). The Hispanicism travestism [sic] (English: transvestism) is sometimes seen in articles in English about the topic, especially by South American authors.

Brazilian transgender activists, Indianarae Siqueira and Erika Hilton, coined the term transvestigênere (English: transvestigender), to encompass all the spectrum of travesti, transgender, and transsexual experiences in a unifying word. The term is inclusive of trans non-binary people, trans men, trans women, and transmasculine individuals, using neolingual ending.

Some also use the term travesty, ending with the letter y, to mean the same as travesti, but sounding more artistic, subversive, or decolonial.

== History and culture ==
=== Argentina ===
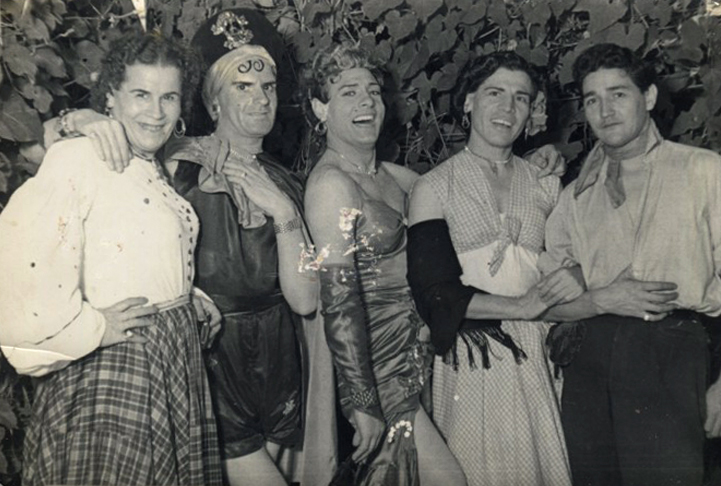
A group of travestis c. 1945, during a private celebration in the outskirts of Buenos Aires, away from the police

An important historical source of information on the travesti community during the 20th century are the firsthand accounts of Malva Solís, who emigrated from Chile as a teenager and lived in Argentina until her death in 2015, at the age of 93. She was regarded as the longest-lived travesti from the country.

After collecting testimonies from travestis over the age of seventy, Josefina Fernández found in 2004 that most of them regarded the first period of Juan Perón's government—who ruled Argentina from 1946 to 1955—as "the one that most clearly began the persecution of gay men and travestis, whether or not they practiced street prostitution." In those years, travestis (identified at that time as mariconas) began to be regularly imprisoned at the Devoto prison, as "sex offenders." The prison was a recurring meeting point for travestis and continued to be so until the 21st-century.

Despite its repressive aspects, the prison space gave them the possibility of generating solidarity strategies and forging links that would later spread outside. They even developed their own argot known as carrilche, which was built on prison jargon. As anthropologist María Soledad Cutuli explains: "Today this code is known as the teje. It consists of taking up elements of prison jargon or "[police] lunfardo", deforming some syllables of certain words, and also using invented terms such as cirilqui to refer to the police, or even the polysemic teje (Spanish for "weaving"), which can mean, depending on the context, 'lie, story, argument, affair.' To say that someone is a tejedora implies a subtle way of qualifying her as a liar; to ask 'what are they tejiendo?' refers to assuming that a meeting or conversation may have ulterior motives".

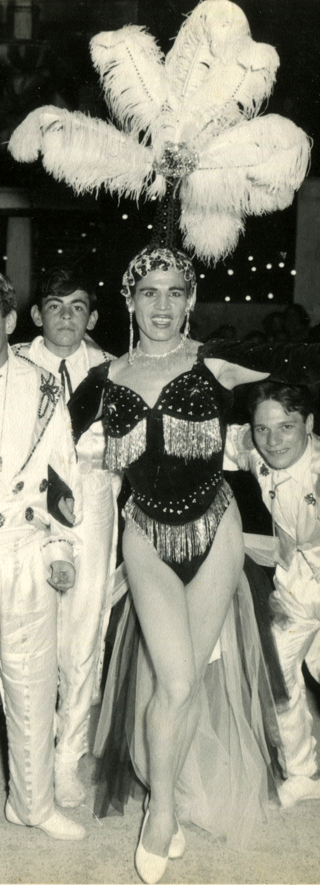
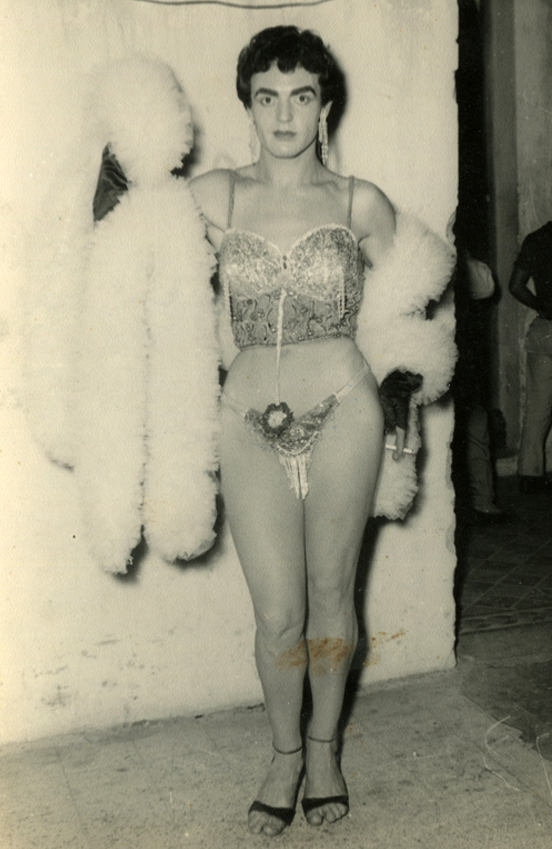
Travesti performers—including Malva Solís (left)—during the Buenos Aires Carnival, c. 1960.

The Carnival was historically regarded as the popular festivity of travestis, as it was the only time of the year in which they could express themselves freely in the public space without suffering police persecution. As a travesti from Buenos Aires recalled in 2019: "They were 6 days of freedom and 350 in prison. I'm not exaggerating. So it was for us. This is how it was before and after the dictatorship, even worse after the dictatorship. Those days it was something magical: because from being discriminated against we would turn into diva-like. If there were no travestis in a carnival parade, it seemed like something was missing."

The Buenos Aires Carnival's murgas first incorporated "messy" cross-dressing acts in the 1940s and 1950s to entertain audiences, a modality that later gave way to the transformista figure (i.e. drag queens)—defined as "the luxuriously dressed maricón"—becoming an attraction for the public. According to Malva Solís, two travestis from La Boca's carnival parade named Cualo and Pepa "La Carbonera" pioneered of the figure of the "murga's vedette", an innovation that began around 1961.

This little-documented phenomenon known as the "travesti carnival movement" marked a milestone in the parades of the 1960s and 1970s, and had the participation of make-up artists, costume designers and choreographers from Buenos Aires' revue theatrical scene, all of them maricones. A 1968 Primera Plana article on the Carnival of Buenos Aires reported: "Those who resist disappearing are travestis, who began by exaggerating their feminine charms and have ended up in a dangerous refinement. Wigs and modern cosmetics turned them into suggestive stars, whose sexual identity was no longer so simple to grasp."

In 2011, Solís reflected on the importance of Carnival celebrations for travestis: "I think to myself, that the leitmotif of the travestis who integrated the murgas was to bring out from the bottom of their soul their repressed self of the rest of the year. Everyone saw them and applauded them, but could not understand that behind that bright facade there was a desire, the desire to be recognized and accepted in order to live in freedom."

Contrary to the 1950s, the 1970s are considered an era of "artistic travesti 'uncover'" (Spanish: destape), which began with the arrival of a Brazilian travesti who performed in a well-known theater in Buenos Aires. Her show paved the way door to later performances by local travestis.

According to Solís, the use of the term travesti began to be used in the 1960s, initially as a way to refer to the cross-dressing and transsexual performers who came from abroad to do shows. In 1963, French entertainer Coccinelle visited Buenos Aires to perform at the Teatro Maipo and made a big impact among local mariconas. Solís told researcher María Soledad Cutuli in 2013:

Beginning with Coccinelle (...) there is a whole opening, something new that is coming. A lot of 'siliconized' [performers] came, plastic surgeries; social openness, (...) new opportunities for mariconas, 'the travesti artist' is inaugurated. (...) From then on a new way of life opened. (...) The culture of the puto artist, all of them were already walking around with cotton stuffing to make their breasts, and they were already going out to sing, to dance...

The stage became the only place where travestis could publicly dress as women, as it was forbidden to do so on the streets. Around 1964, travesti artists—at that time named lenci, in reference to a type of cloth, because they "were like little rag dolls"—met at an apartment on Avenida Callao, where they rehearsed musical acts and prepared to go out to nightclub or theater shows. Since the use of silicone had not yet become widespread, they resorted to the use of female hormones to "be able to show their breasts on stage as aesthetically as possible". According to writer Daniela Vizgarra: "If you didn't have an Anovlar 21 in your makeup bag, apparently you were nonexistent."

Travestis emulated a contoured figure—which emphasized breasts and buttocks—through paddings called truquis, piu-piú or colchón (lit. 'mattress'), first using cotton fabrics and later foam rubber. While padding had been in use since at least the 1950s, the arrival of lycra in the 1960s allowed them to "build more realistic physical contours." The feminine beauty ideal put forward by American television also included small and pointed noses but, as surgeries were too expensive, most travestis settled for temporary arrangements, resorting to the use of glue and objects that could emulate a prosthesis.

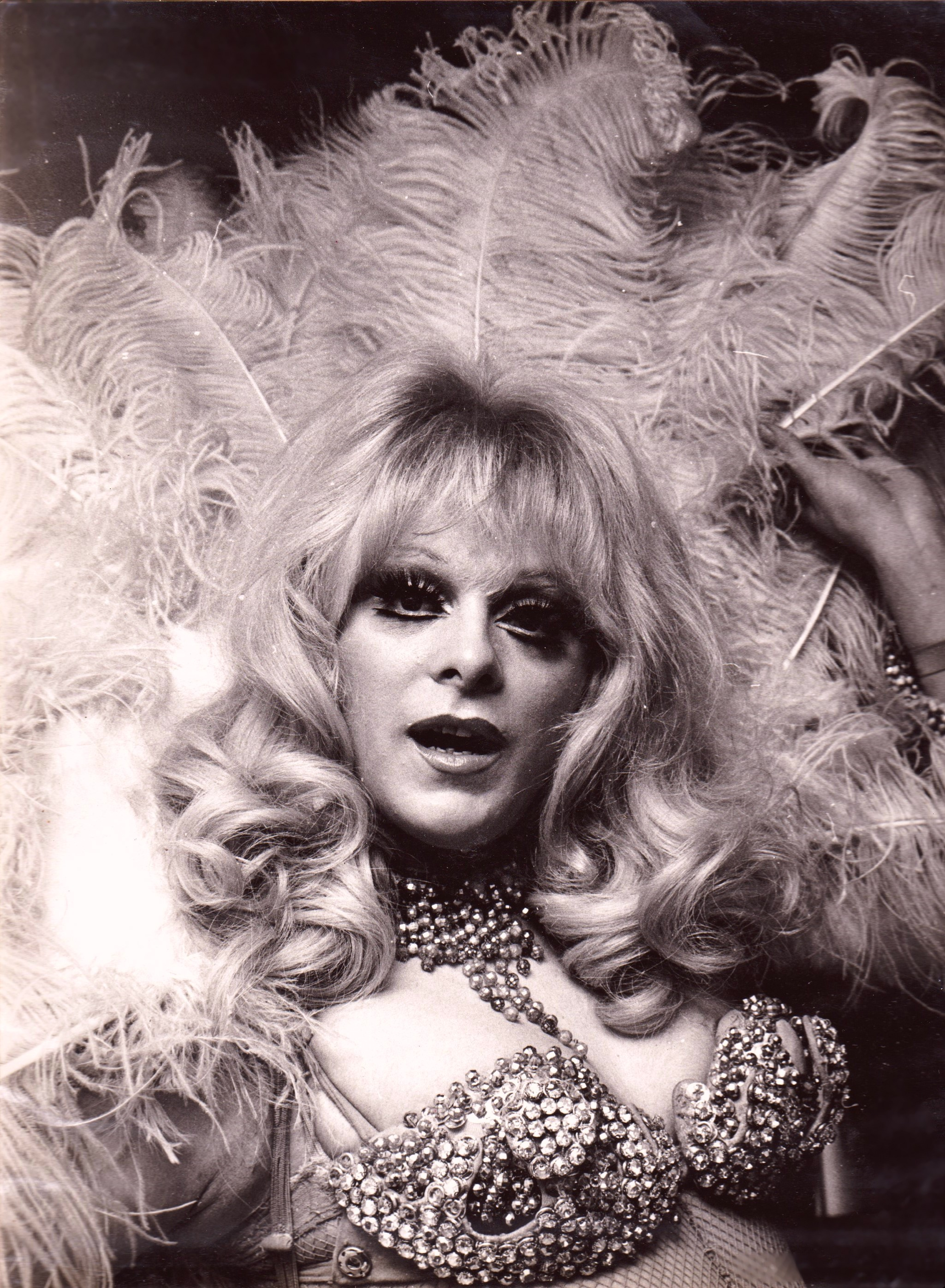
Jorge Perez Evelyn in 1975

According to María Belén Correa, the emergence of travesti stage performers such Vanessa Show, Jorge Perez Evelyn, Brigitte Gambini and Ana Lupe Chaparro in the 1960s and 1970s constituted "another way of activism". According to Jorge Perez Evelyn, the first people to popularize transformismo in the theater scene—the "first travestis to appear in Buenos Aires"—were the members of a group called Les Girls in 1972, followed by Vanessa Show and Ana Lupez. She also mentioned the travestis of the "following era", which included Graciela Scott, Claudia Prado and herself, who debuted in 1975.

Evelyn was the first travesti to achieve the role of vedette in Corrientes Avenue between the famous Argentine celebrities in the revue "Corrientes de Lujo". A military dictatorship was taking over the country at the time, and Evelyn was obligated to left the country due to death threats left in her room. After Evelyn there was a fifteen year period of suppression for the community due to military persecution.

The arrival of industrial silicone in Buenos Aires radically transformed travesti bodies and subjectivities. It was brought from France to Brazil, and from there to neighboring countries. In the 1980s, famous actress and vedette Moria Casán became a role model for local travestis, not only for her voluptuous body, but also for her public image of sexual ease. This contoured body type ideal began to shift in the 1990s, when "more stylized and androgynous female forms" were popularized. With the appearance of silicone, a new "hierarchy between the bodies" of travestis arose, differentiating between those that had or did not have silicone, but also regarding the amount used and the quality of the final results. As researcher Ana Grabiela Álvarez explains: "The arrival of industrial silicone brings them closer to a generic female construction and fixes both bodily transformations and a particular prostitution niche".

In the 1980s, the Pan-American Highway—which connects the City of Buenos Aires with the Buenos Aires Province's different districts—established itself as the most important area in which travestis worked as prostitutes, and thus became one of the definitive aspects of the travesti identity for Argentine society and media culture. In 1986, Canal 9 journalist José de Zer reported, and at the same time denounced, the murder of travestis working on the Pan-American Highway. Due to the television report, both the journalist and the channel were sued and faced trial, and travestis had to organize themselves during the following years so as to make their ignored identity appear in the mass media.

Travestis broke into Argentine public opinion in the 1990s, and their first appearances on television coincided with the organized appearance of the travestis on the public scene and in the streets of Buenos Aires. In 1991, Keny de Michelli became the first travesti to appear on free-to-air television, appearing in various programs in order to make the community visible. These appearances were quickly trivialized and presented travestilidade as a peculiar hyper-feminine expression of masculinity.

After gaining popularity as a vedette in 1995, Cris Miró caused a media sensation for her gender identity and expression. As the first travesti to become a national celebrity, she is regarded as a symbol of the social milieu of the 1990s and paved the way for other Argentine travestis and trans women to gain popularity as vedettes, most notably Flor de la V. Parallel to Miró's rise to notoriety, the political organization of Argentine travestis was emerging, and activists began making their first appearances in local media. Miró's celebrity was initially criticized by a portion of these activists, who resented the unequal treatment they received and her attempt to embody an idealized vision of the perfect woman.

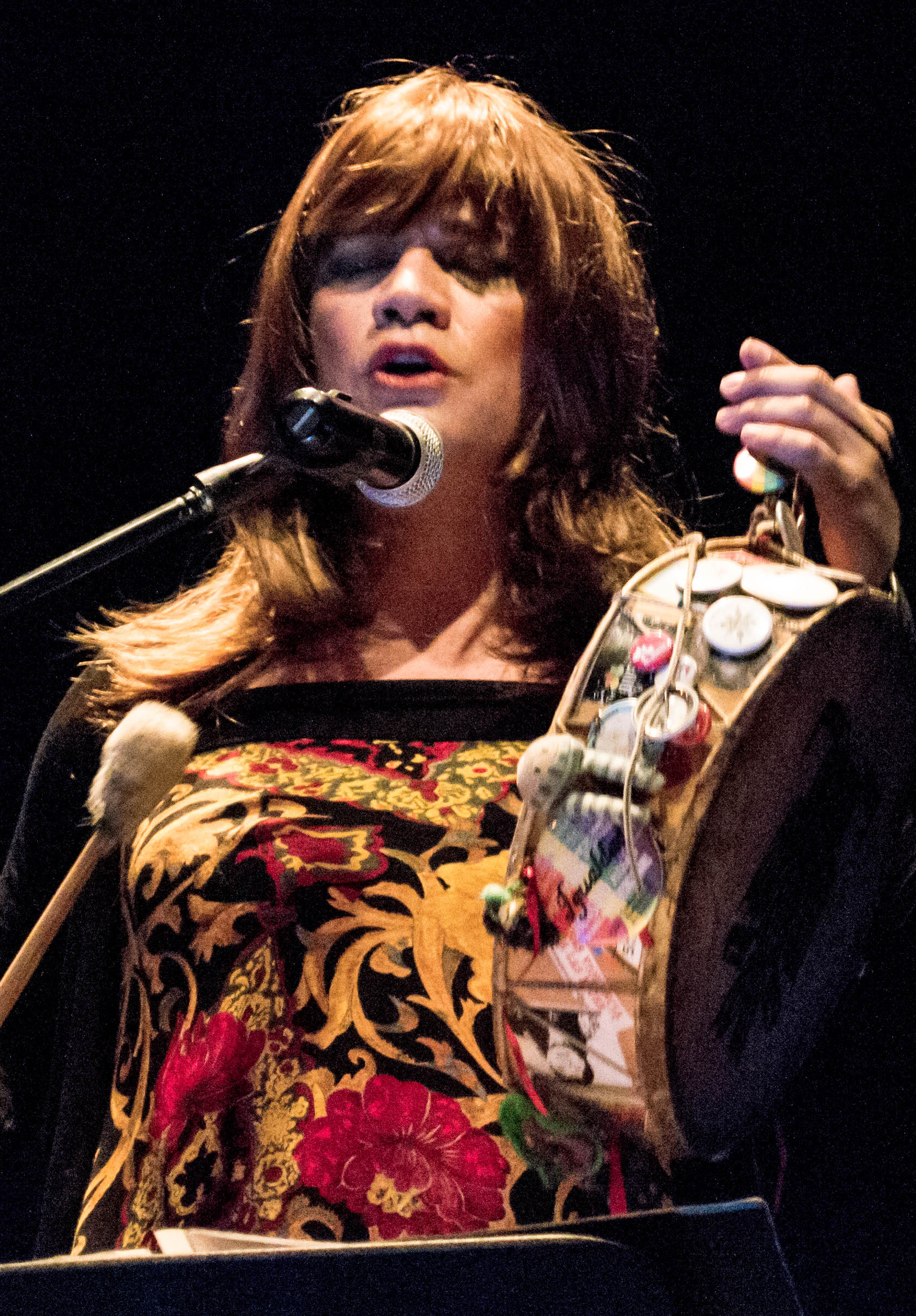
Poet and musician Susy Shock performing in Mexico City in 2013

During the early to mid 2000s, the musical and literary career of Susy Shock, a renowned travesti activist, was built and gained visibility through LGBT cultural spaces such as Casa Mutual Giribone in Buenos Aires and the Asentamiento 8 de Mayo in José León Suárez, Buenos Aires Province.

In November 2007, the first issue of El Teje, the first periodical written by travestis in Latin America, was published in a joint initiative between activists and the Ricardo Rojas Cultural Center.

By the late 2010s, the travesti community of Buenos Aires and its surroundings gained recognition for its creative and artistic contributions, and had inserted itself in the "queer countercultural scene", a circuit of theaters, bars, and cultural centers such as Casa Brandon, Tierra Violeta, MU Trinchera Boutique and, more recently, Feliza and Maricafé. As researcher Patricia Fogelman pointed out in 2020: "In this set of spaces, travestis are seen more and more frequently performing theater, stand-up monologues, reciting poetry, doing performances, accompanying musical bands, etc. On the other hand, within the same extended community there is a clear interest in incorporating [travestis] and highlighting them as central characters in novels, plays, and songs. Thus, we could say that around the figure of travestis there is a recognition and a forceful attempt to put them in places of visibility, especially, by lesbian authors of novels and music for alternative young people."

Las malas, the debut novel by travesti writer and actress Camila Sosa Villada—first published in 2019 in Argentina and the following year in Spain—has had critical and commercial success. It focuses on the lives of a group of travestis from Córdoba, Argentina and their work as prostitutes at Sarmiento Park. However, Sosa Villada has denied that the book was conceived as an act of activism or visibility, claiming that focusing discussions about travestis around marginality and sex work silences their current cultural contributions to society. The ongoing editorial success of Las malas has sparked interest in local transgender literature, and has been framed within a so-called "new Latin American boom", while several non-male authors from the region have captured the attention of the international market.

With the onset of the COVID-19 pandemic in Argentina in March 2020, travestis were one of the groups most affected by the lockdown, since most of them rely on prostitution for income, that they were then left without. In many cases they were under threat of eviction from the hotels where they were already paying elevated prices. Different NGOs came out to face the emergency, such as 100% Diversidad y Derechos and La Rosa Naranja.

In 2021, Flor de la V, a transgender Argentinian celebrity, announced that she no longer identified as a trans woman but as a travesti, writing: "I discovered a more correct way to get in touch with how I feel: neither woman, nor heterosexual, nor homosexual, nor bisexual. I am a dissident of the gender system, my political construction in this society is that of a pure-bred travesti. That what I am and what I want and choose to be."

=== Brazil ===
Anthropologist Don Kulick noted that: "Travestis appear to exist throughout Latin America, but in no other country are they as numerous and well known as in Brazil, where they occupy a strikingly visible place in both social space and the cultural imaginary." For this reason, they are frequently invoked by social commentators as symbols of Brazil itself.

One of the most prominent travestis in the Brazilian cultural imaginary of the late 20th century was Roberta Close, who became a household name in the mid-1980s and was "widely acclaimed to be the most beautiful woman in Brazil," posing in Playboy and regularly appearing in television and several other publications. She is currently classified as an intersex transgender woman.

Photographer Madalena Schwartz made a series of portraits of the travesti scene of São Paulo in the 1970s.

Historically, Brazilians used the words traveca or traveco to denominate travestis, which is now considered a transphobic slur.

In recent years, hiring trans women has become popular in the advertising industry, although at the same time differentiating them from transvestites.

=== Paraguay ===
In the 1980s, during Alfredo Stroessner's military dictatorship, twenty travestis were arrested as part of the Palmieri Case (Spanish: Caso Palmieri), among them the well-known Carla and Liz Paola. A 14-year-old teenager, Mario Luis Palmieri, had been found murdered and the hypothesis held by the police was that of a homosexual crime of passion, unleashing one of the most famous persecutions of LGBT identities in the history of Paraguay.

Paraguayan travestis use a secret language called jeito—originated in the field of prostitution— to protect themselves from clients, the police, or any person strange to the places where they work and that threatens the security of the group. Some of its words are rua (street), odara (the travesti head of a prostitution area), alibán (police), and fregués (clients).

=== Uruguay ===
Gloria Meneses lived openly as a travesti from the 1950s and was known as the "mother of travestis".

=== Spain ===
The arrival of the medical model of transsexuality was earlier in Europe than in Latin America, and therefore its impact was different in each region. In Spain, travesti identities are generally included under the category "transsexual" in academic research, since it is perceived as more "politically correct". As a result of the powerful medical institutionalization around transsexuality, calling oneself "travesti" in Spain is considered a discrediting act, due to its close link with prostitution, especially after the migrations of Latin American travestis. Nevertheless, in the 1970s the term "travesti" was widely used to refer to any people who were assigned male at birth but dressed and lived as women, either temporarily or permanently. In fact, the few Spanish self-described "transsexuals" who had sex reassignment surgery were not widely accepted by their peers and were seen as "castrated people". During the Franco era, travestis were persecuted through the creation of a strong legislative and police apparatus.

Between the late 1980s and early 1990s, transsexuals—who no longer called themselves "travestis"—began to organize themselves by creating their own political collectives, demanding the institutionalization of transsexuality in the health system, as well as the end of stereotypes that linked them to HIV/AIDS, prostitution, and marginalization—an image embodied in the concept of travesti. Therefore, the travesti specificity in Spain is usually subsumed under the most consensual medical category of "transsexual" or in more politicized terms such as "trans" or "transgender", as they give greater social legitimacy. Since the vast majority of travestis come from poor social environments with very low education, their differences with transsexual activists are also given by the demands of these more intellectualized groups. Nevertheless, some modern-day people living in Spain choose to label themselves as travestis as a genderfluid gender identity.

== Academic research ==
=== Overview ===
After a long period of criminalization, "sexual deviations" became an object of study in the medical and sexual sciences, which established the different forms of deviation. Between 1870 and 1920, a large amount of research was produced about people who cross-dressed or wished to adopt the role assigned to the opposite sex. In 1910, the renowned German sexologist Magnus Hirschfeld used the term transvestite (travesti in Spanish and Portuguese), in his text Transvestites: The Erotic Drive to Cross-Dress (German: Die Transvestiten: ein Untersuchung über den erotischen Verkleidungstrieb), to describe "people who feel a compulsion to wear clothes of the opposite sex" and rejected the idea that they were a variant of homosexuality, which at that time was a very widespread conception within sexology. Between 1920 and 1950, the terms transvestism and eonism were incorporated into the scientific literature, although generally these reports only supplemented those of previous years.

During the 1950s, the term transsexual—first used by American sexologist David Oliver Cauldwell—gained relevance at the same time that sexual identity clinics and sex change surgery emerged. This caused transvestism to be temporarily put aside as a topic of medical interest in the late 1960s and the 1970s.

Travestis have been studied by disciplines like social psychology, and especially social anthropology, which have extensively documented the phenomenon in both classical and more recent ethnographies. Scholarship produced on South American travestis has largely been produced by non-trans academics from the Global North, something that has been vocally critiqued by activists. As it has the largest population of travestis (where they are even invoked as cultural icons), Brazil is the country with the most study of these identities, and the works written in and about Brazilian travestis outnumber those of any other Latin American country. While academic interest in Brazilian travesti prostitutes began to spread in the 1990s and early 2000s—through international researches like Don Kulick, Peter Fry, and Richard Parker, as well as local authors such as Marcos Renato Benedetti and Helio Silva—travesti identities didn't become a central theme in the country's gender studies until the mid-to-late-2000s, alongside the growing influence of queer theory, post-structuralism and LGBT activism in academic literature. Anthropological research about the travesti population in the Spanish language is much scarcer than English and Portuguese, especially among Latin American authors. Some scholars relate this to the late arrival of the medical model of transsexuality, which has also led to the use of "inappropriate" terms to designate identities that do not adhere to gender norms. Relevant Spanish-language studies about travestis come from researchers from Spain, Argentina, Colombia, Mexico, and Ecuador.

=== Main hypotheses ===
According to Argentine researcher María Soledad Cutuli, the most recent travesti ethnographies fall under five main axes of analysis: "gender identity", "corporeality and subjectivity", "health and sexuality", "prostitution and sociability" and, to a lesser extent, "political organization". Faced with the phenomenon, researchers have generally proposed one of three hypotheses: that travestis constitute a third gender, that travestis reinforce one of the only two genders available in their society (masculine or feminine), or that travestis challenge the notion of binarism, but "far from being their proposal that of supernumerary or multiple genders, what they do seek is the deconstruction of the category of gender itself." Since the 1990 publication of Gender Trouble, several ideas put forward by American philosopher Judith Butler—like the claim that the concept of a biological sex is itself a gendered notion—have been of great impact for the academic analysis of travestis and gender studies in general.

==== As a third gender ====
A very wide range of anthropological studies have investigated travestis on the hypothesis that they should be interpreted as an expression of a third gender or sex, in the same manner of the berdaches of North America, the hijras of India, the muxes of Mexico, the kathoey of Thailand, the māhū of Tahiti, the fa'afafine of Samoa, and the xanith of Oman, among other identities.

Among the first anthropologists to propose the category of third gender were Kay Martin and Barbara Voorhies in 1978, who based their research on the review of classical ethnographies about berdaches. The idea of a third gender was later put forward in the mid-1990s by authors such as Gilbert Herdt, Will Roscoe, Hilda Habychain, and Anne Bolin; and extended to other non-Western peoples. In 1998, Kulick argued that: "Travestis may well be considered to be a 'third,' in some of the senses in which Marjorie Garber uses that term, but they are not a third that is situated outside or beyond a gendered binary." Writing for The Guardian in 2019, Victor Madrigal-Borloz listed the travesti people from Brazil and Argentina as one of the many worldwide identities that are neither male or female, alongside the yimpininni of the Tiwi people in Australia, as well as fa'afafine in Samoa, two spirit in Canada and the United States, and hijra in Bangladesh, India and Pakistan.

==== As a reinforcement of gender binarism ====
With her 1989 book Travestism and the Politics of Gender, Annie Woodhouse established herself among the researchers that consider travestism a reinforcement of gender identities, in this case the female identity. Woodhouse argued that travestis see gender as something that is rigidly demarcated between masculinity and femininity and, in this sense, reproduce traditional gender roles that objectify women. In her 1993 and 1995 researches on travestism, Argentine anthropologist Victoria Barreda criticized the third gender category, arguing that travestis construct an identity that necessarily takes gender stereotypes as a reference point. Another researcher who follows this trend is Richard Ekins, who described transvestites as "feminized men".

Among the research based on participant observation, French anthropologist Annick Prieur has been considered a pioneer for her 1998 ethnography on the travesti community from the suburbs of Mexico City, in which she argued that they reproduce their society's gender binarism. Brazilian researchers Neuza Maria de Oliveira and Hélio Silva—considered the founders of the ethnography about the daily life of Brazilian travestis—also aligned themselves in this view, as did the latter's follower Marcelo José Oliveira. Despite these authors' intention of increasing academic visibility to travestis, they have been widely criticized by their successors for using male pronouns when referring to them.

Critically developing upon these early works through the use of ethnomethodology, Kulick studied the travesti population of Salvador, Bahia and placed their social stigmatization within the larger context of class and racial inequalities. Kulick's conclusions are far removed from later postmodern positions, as he argued that the travesti identity is configured from conservative social structures. The author proposed an alternative position, suggesting that travestis base their identity not on anatomical sex differences, but rather on sexual orientation, identifying themselves as a subtype of gay men. He used the term "not-men" to refer to travestis, claiming he chose it: "partly for want of a culturally elaborated label and partly to foreground my conviction that the gender system that makes it possible for travestis to emerge and make sense is one that is massively oriented towards, if not determined by, male subjectivity, male desire, and male pleasure, as those are culturally elaborated in Brazil." He further explained:

It is important to understand that the claim I am making here is that travestis share a gender with women, not that they are women (or that women are travesti—even if that latter proposition might be a fruitful one to explore further). The distinction is crucial. Individual travestis will not always or necessarily share individual women's roles, goals, or social status. (...) However, inasmuch as travestis share the same gender with women, they are understood to share (and they feel themselves to share) with women a whole spectrum of tastes, perceptions, behaviors, styles, feelings, and desires.

Kulick's research had a much broader international impact than that of his predecessors, due to its insertion in North American academia and for being published in English. The aforementioned authors have in common the idea that travesti identity does not subvert gender roles nor heteronormativity.

==== As a dislocation of gender itself ====
Informed by Judith Butler's ideas and queer theory, recent scholarship analyzes travestis as a demonstration of the performative character of gender, claiming that their identities are in a permanent process of construction that enters into dispute with gender binarism. As noted by Spanish anthropologist María Fernanda Guerrero Zavala in 2015: "At the academic level, the approaches to identities and bodies from the queer point of view, which are gaining strength, are proposed as a way out of the static conception of identities and propose angles of theoretical interpretation based on life experiences."

Fernández addresses the travesti issue using critical gender studies.

In a 2012 research on Brazilian travesti immigrants in Barcelona, Spanish anthropologist Julieta Vartabedian Cabral suggested that travestis make their gender, highlighting the feminization of their bodies and sexual relationships as evidence. Fellow researcher María Fernanda Guerrero Zavala noted that: "Faced with other theorizations that call for the disembodiment of identities and queer and transgender activism, Vartabedian structures a "body" based on the most carnal experiences of transvestites".

=== The "travesti theory" ===
A fundamental part of existing research was produced by travestis themselves, as is the case of activist Lohana Berkins, whose articles, conferences, interviews, and compilations are the pillar for the study of this community in Argentina. In recent years, there have been discussions regarding the so-called "travesti theory", a critical theory that proposes the construction of their own paradigm, epistemology, and ontology, through which the established discourses can be disarticulated in order to produce new knowledge production modes on the travesti population, from a regional and decolonizing perspective. Peruvian scholar Malú Machuca Rose described travesti as "the refusal to be trans, the refusal to be woman, the refusal to be intelligible. (...) Travesti is classed and raced: it means you do not present femininely all of the time because you cannot afford to." According to Rizki, the "travesti theory" constitutes a "Latin/x American body of work and a body politics with an extensive transregional history", citing South American writers such as Berkins, Giuseppe Campuzano, Claudia Rodríguez and Marlene Wayar as exponents. He defined travesti as "a politics of refusal", as it "disavows coherence and is an always already racialized and classed geopolitical identification that gestures toward the inseparability of indigeneity, blackness, material precarity, sex work, HIV status, and uneven relationships to diverse state formations." According to scholar Dora Silva Santana, travesti is "a negation of an imposed dominant expectation of womanhood that centers on people who are cisgender, heteronormative, able-bodied, elitist, and white." Marlene Wayar's 2018 book Travesti / Una teoría lo suficientemente buena has been considered an important contribution to the field. Wayar explained:

What we are proposing is that travesti is that gaze, that position in the world and we analyze it from Latin America because that is the world we are in. We believe that all the previous and contemporary theories are very good, but we now have to make them pass through our body and territory to know if they give us good or bad results, (...) it has to be a theory that is not brought down from any illuminated territory but is rather built with dialogue.

== Living conditions ==
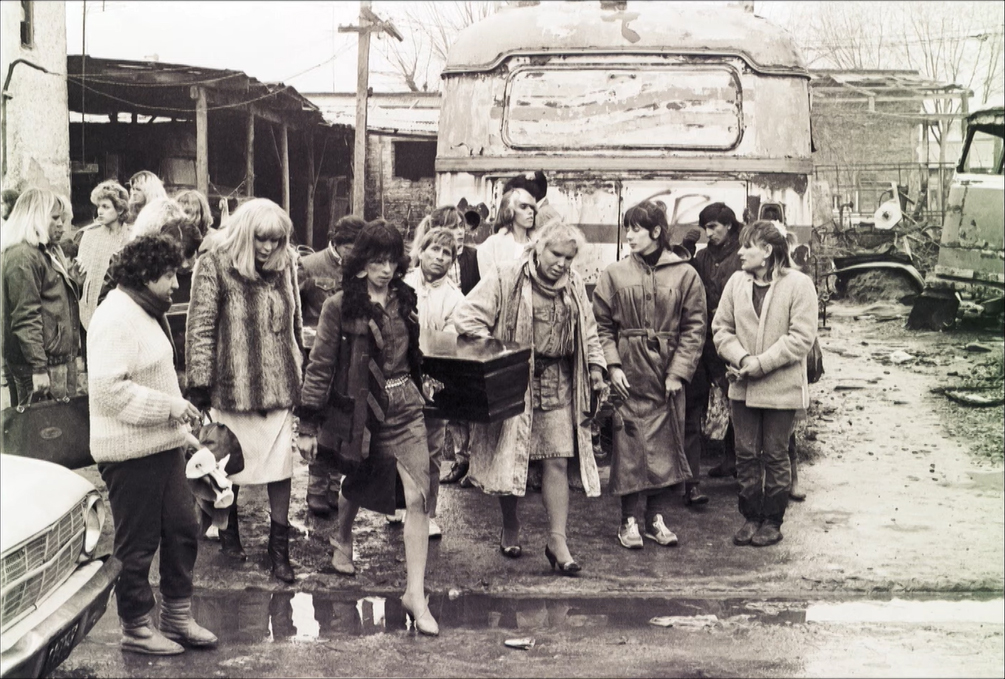
A group of Argentine travestis carrying the coffin of their murdered friend in 1987

Travestis are a historically vulnerable and criminalized population, victims of social exclusion and structural violence. Discrimination, harassment, arbitrary detentions, torture, and murder are commonplace throughout Latin America. Several LGBT activists, journalists, and artists denounce the violence and early death to which the travesti population is subjected as an authentic genocide. A study carried out in 2011 in Central America revealed, for example, that more than 80% of the surveyed population felt they have the right to attack trans and travesti people because of their way of being. In his pioneering investigation of the travesti population of Salvador, Bahia in the 1990s, anthropologist Don Kulick found that they are "one of the most marginalized and despised groups in Brazilian society." According to a 2017 research published by the Ministry of Defense of Argentina titled La revolución de las mariposas, 74.6% of trans women and travestis in Buenos Aires said they had suffered some type of violence, a high number, although lower than that registered in 2005, which was 91.9%. The same study indicated that they die on average at the age of 32, well below the average life expectancy of the country. Similarly, travestis and transsexuals in Brazil have a life expectancy of 35 years. In 2021, it is estimated that a travesti or trans person dies violently every 48 hours in Brazil, with at least 80 murders in the first half of the year. Brazil is considered "the most transphobic country in the world", and, according to an annual balance carried out by Trans Murder Monitoring in 2020, the country is at the top of the list of trans people murders. Lohana Berkins reflected in 2015: "Reaching old age is for a travesti like belonging to an exclusive club, because the mishaps that accompany marginal life—which lead to a death that is always considered premature in terms of population statistics—are the perennial consequences of a persecuted identity."

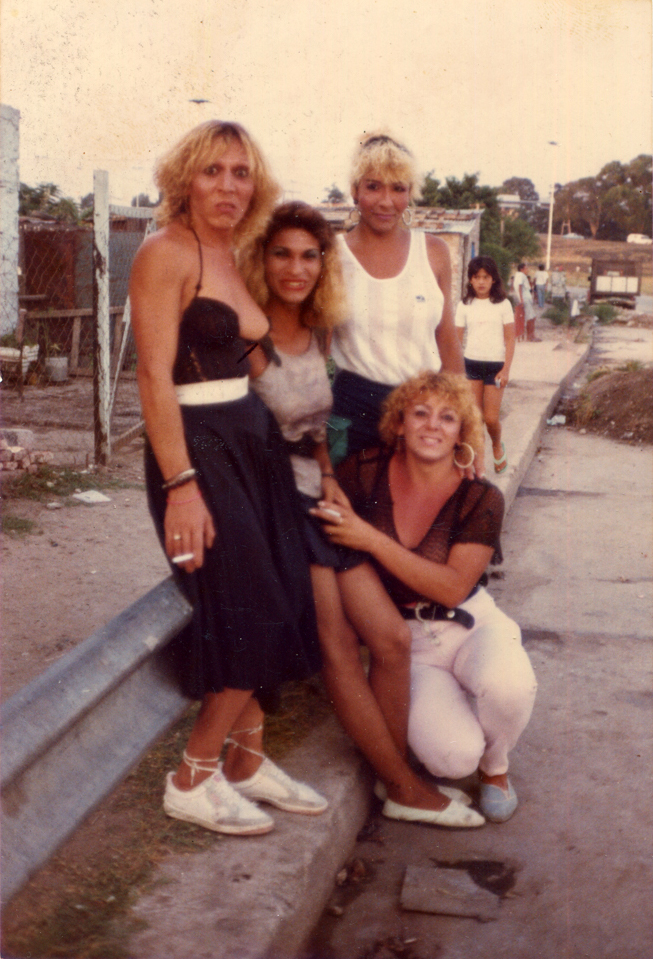
A group of travesti sex workers at a villa miseria (slum) in La Matanza, Buenos Aires Province in 1989

In recent times, the concept of "travesticide" (Spanish: travesticidio)—along with "transfemicide" or "trans femicide"—has been extended to refer to the hate crime understood as the murder of a travesti due to her gender condition. In 2015, the murder case of activist Diana Sacayán became the first precedent in Argentina and in Latin America to be criminally judged as a "travesticide". According to Blas Radi and Alejandra Sardá-Chandiramani:

Travesticide/transfemicide is the end of a continuum of violence that begins with the expulsion of home, exclusion from education, the health system and labor market, early initiation into prostitution/sex work, the permanent risk of contracting sexually transmitted diseases, criminalization, social stigmatization, pathologization, persecution and police violence. This pattern of violence constitutes the space of experience for trans women and travesties, which is mirrored in their waning horizon of expectations. In it, death is nothing extraordinary; on the contrary, in the words of Octavio Paz "life and death are inseparable, and each time the first loses significance, the second becomes insignificant".

Most travestis assume their condition at a very young age, and are usually perceived by others as overly effeminate boys during childhood. This mostly conflicts their relationships with their families and with the educational system, which are marked by discrimination and later abandonment. Most are either expelled from their families or left them of their own accord—generally between the ages of thirteen and eighteen—and in most cases judge the occasion as the beginning of their new lives as travestis. They are usually forced to leave their towns or even countries in search of less hostile locations. In her pioneering 2004 research book Cuerpos desobedientes, Josefina Fernández found that most of the travestis surveyed had been victims of child sexual abuse, although she noted: "I must clarify, however, that it is a topic that I approached with great caution (...), in order to avoid any 'adventurous' readings that might associate rape with travestism in terms of cause-consequence."

The association between travestis and prostitution constitutes one of the most widespread "common sense representations in Latin American societies". As their living conditions are marked by exclusion from the formal educational system and the labor market, prostitution is constituted as their "only source of income, the most widespread survival strategy and one of the very few spaces for recognition of the travesti identity as a possibility of being in the world". This in turn, has an important—or defining—role in the construction of their identity. Brazilian organization ANTRA estimates that 90% of travestis and trans women of the country resort to prostitution at least once in their life. According to La revolución de las mariposas, 88% of travestis and trans women from Buenos Aires never had a formal job, while 51.5% never had a job of any kind. 70.4% of those surveyed said they earned their living from prostitution, and of this group, 75.7% had been doing so from an age less than or equal to 18 years. 87.2% of these travesti and trans women surveyed who currently work as prostitutes wish to leave the activity if they were to be offered a job. The expulsion of travestis from the educational system is a necessary element to understand the use of prostitution as an almost exclusive means of support, since the "hostile circumstances that mark the schooling experience of the majority of travesti girls and adolescents severely condition the possibilities of these subjects in terms of social inclusion and access to quality employment in adulthood."

The strong stigmatization towards travestis and the sex work that they carry out generally conditions the service they receive from medical personnel. Fear of rejection by health workers often leads them to self-medicate and to attend health institutions when conditions or diseases are already at very advanced levels. Due to the strong stereotype towards travestis in relation to prostitution and HIV, they are usually automatically referred to HIV/AIDS centers every time they attend a medical center, ignoring their other health needs. Even though the high prevalence of HIV/AIDS in travestis is real, it stems from a process of social exclusion that "ends up incarnating in travesti bodies and confirming the stereotype." Travestis are in an extremely vulnerable situation when it comes to the virus. A study published in Culture, Health & Sexuality in 2009 found that they are one of the groups most affected by HIV in Mexico; while a research published in Global Public Health in 2016 found that there is a 30% prevalence of the virus in the travesti population of Lima, Peru. Some health systems continue to include travestis under the epidemiological category of "men who have sex with men" (MSM), with little consideration of their unique situation and needs. Recent studies indicate the need for multilevel HIV prevention campaigns that prioritize the travesti population.

Access to housing is one of the problems that most affects the travesti community. In Buenos Aires, 65.1% of travestis and trans women live in rental rooms in hotels, private houses, pensions or apartments, whether authorized by the competent body or "taken" by those who manage them irregularly. According to a study carried out by INDEC and INADI in 2012, 46% of the travesti and trans women population in Argentina lived in deficit housing, while another study carried out by ATTTA and Fundacion Huesped in 2014 indicated that one third of them lived in poor households, particularly in the Northwest region of the country.

== Activism ==
=== Argentine movement ===
==== 1990–2004 ====
Travesti identity has an important history of political mobilization in Argentina, where it is proudly claimed as the "political locus par excellence" of resistance to the policies of gender binarism and cissexism. Argentine travestis began to organize between the late 1980s and early 1990s, in repudiation of persecution, mistreatment, and police violence, as well as the police edicts (Spanish: edictos policiales) in force at that time. A pioneering figure was Karina Urbina, the first transgender rights activist in the country, although not framed under the term travesti but rather transsexual. Unlike the scandalous public attitude of travestis, transsexuals like Urbina showed themselves in television as sensitive and affected, qualities they most associated with femininity. Another initial difference between the two groups is that travestis fought against police edicts and demanded their annulment, while transsexuals sought to be recognized as women and to be registered as such in their documents.

The travesti political movement was formally organized with the founding of the Asociación de Travestis Argentinas (ATA; English: Association of Argentine Travestis), in 1992 or 1993, depending on the author. Others believe the creation of Travestis Unidas (TU; English: United Travestis) precedes that of ATA, and regard it as the first travesti organization in the country. It was founded by Kenny de Michellis alongside three friends in May 1993. She first came into contact with local gay activism in the early 1990s through Gays DC, an organization formed by Carlos Jáuregui, César Cigliutti, and Marcelo Ferreyra in 1991 after separating from the Comunidad Homosexual Argentina (CHA; English: Argentine Homosexual Community). The three men founded the CHA in 1984 and Jáuregui had been its most visible member, becoming the first person to openly defend his homosexuality in Argentine mass media. The members of Gays DC encouraged De Michellis to form Travestis Unidas and offered her to write a column on the situation of travestis in their official magazine. Her involvement as an activist was fundamentally through her appearances in mass media, as she became the first travesti to appear on national television. At that time, the "exercise of visibility" was considered one of the optimal and preferred ways of approaching travesti activism.

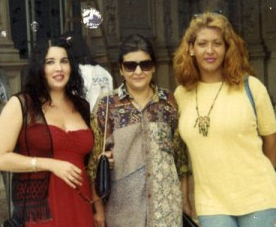
TU's Kenny de Michellis (left), ATA's María Belén Correa (right) and the lawyer for both groups (center) at the Casa Rosada in 1994, asking to have a hearing with the president

María Belén Correa, another of the travestis that began to organize in the early 1990s, also became involved with activism through Gays DC, which she contacted in 1993 seeking legal help. The association's lawyers encouraged her to form her own group and Correa founded ATA, which was later joined by Lohana Berkins and Nadia Echazú. Correa recalled Carlos Jáuregui's role in their activism:

Carlos said that we had brought a new air to [local homosexual] activism. They were occupied with the civil union [project] and we were saying "we cannot live, we cannot walk, we cannot go to the supermarket." Things were literally this way. He was the first one to come to our meetings (...) He wrote our press releases, our speeches, because we didn't know how to do them. (...) He began to tell us that we were activists and taught us to behave as such. We didn't even understand the concept of transsexuality (...), we became activists almost without realizing it.

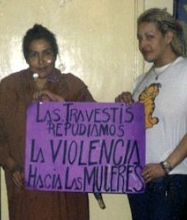
Lohana Berkins (left) and Correa before attending a 1998 feminist demonstration, holding a sign that reads: "We travestis repudiate violence against women"

One of the first major political struggles of travestis occurred within the context of the 1994 amendment of the Constitution of Argentina and revolved around the inclusion of an article of non-discrimination based on sexual orientation in the new constitution of the city of Buenos Aires. Noting that the project excluded travestis, they began to demand that the broader LGBT movement focused not only on sexual orientation but also gender identity issues. At the same time, travestis took part in the discussions to repeal the police edicts under which travestis and sex workers were regularly detained. These edicts were replaced by the Código de Convivencia Urbana (English: Urban Coexistence Code), which confronted travestis with Vecinos de Palermo, a group of residents of Palermo who demanded more police repression and tougher regulations to eradicate prostitutes from their neighborhood.

Within these debates, travestis came into contact with women's rights groups and soon began to be included into spaces of feminist discussion. Their contact with local feminism during the mid-1990s is regarded as a key moment in the development of the Argentine travesti rights movement, as it directed their concerns towards the concept of gender identity, and marked the beginning of transfeminism in the country. The inclusion in particular was that of Berkins, who got into the women's rights movement through meetings with lesbian feminists such as Alejandra Sarda, Ilse Fuskova, Chela Nadio, and Fabiana Tron. Following this approach to theorising gender, ATA was split into two new organizations in 1995: the Organización de Travestis y Transexuales de la República Argentina (OTTRA; English: Organization of Travestis and Transsexuals from the Argentine Republic) and the Asociación Lucha por la Identidad Travesti y Transexual (ALITT; English: Struggle for the Travesti and Transsexual Identity Association). The former—led by Echazú—defended prostitution as a valid way of life, while the latter—led by Berkins—generally rejected it and mainly focused on the social recognition of their identities. They sought to distance themselves from ATA's position that argued that in order to change the living conditions of travestis, they should first of all modify the image that society had of them, ignoring the issue of prostitution.

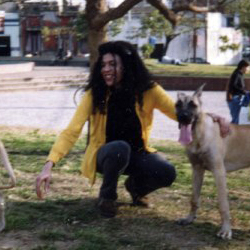
Activist Marlene Wayar in 1998

Between 1993 and 2003, ALITT collaborated with the City of Buenos Aires' Ombudsman's Office (Spanish: Defensoría del Pueblo) in a series of initiatives aimed at the transvestite community. One of the first initiatives promoted by the Ombudsman's Office was the Informe preliminar sobre la situación de las travestis en la ciudad de Buenos Aires in 1999, a statistical report on the living conditions of the city's travestis. Between 1995 and 2005, travesti organizations were strengthened by working with other groups, interacting with the academia and articulating with different political parties. Around 1995, the gay magazine NX organized meetings to discuss the problem of sexual minorities in the country and travesti groups were invited to share their life experiences. These gatherings led to a 1996 national meeting of activists organized in Rosario by the local group Colectivo Arco Iris, which is considered a milestone in the travesti movement, since they widely convinced the rest of the attendees to recognize them as part of the broader Argentine LGBT movement. The irruption of travestis in the Argentine academic environment occurred through the Colectivo Universitario Eros (CUE; English: Eros University Collective), a student collective from the Faculty of Philosophy and Letters of the University of Buenos Aires (UBA), which pioneered queer theory in the country and remained active from 1993 to 1996. In 1997, members of this group formed the Área de Estudios Queer (AEQ; English: Queer Studies Area) within the Centro Cultural Ricardo Rojas (also of the UBA), and travesti activists Lohana Berkins, Marlene Wayar, and Nadia Echazú soon joined. According to Berkins: "Our appearance in the academic field was through the Grupo Eros, which included Flavio Rapisardi, Silvia Delfino, Mabel Bellucci, and which later dissolved. Then they formed the Área Queer, where they also sat us next to an intellectual and we began to argue, on our terms, with our abilities, but we began to argue."

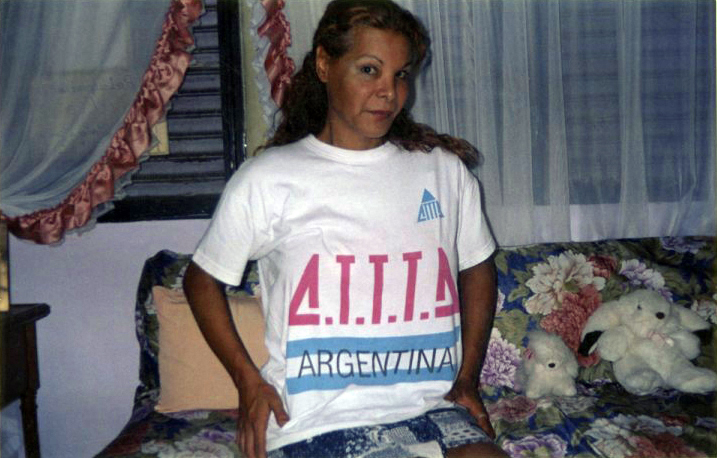
An activist from ATTTA in 2003, during a group meeting

During the late 1990s and early 2000s, travesti activists claimed to have felt "invisible" by the broader LGBT movement, which mainly focused on the passing of a civil union law. As a result, the group of travesti activists led by Berkins was closer to the feminist and sex worker rights movements. In a 1997 landmark case, Mariela Muñoz, became the first transgender person to be officially recognized by the Argentine state and was granted the custody of some of the children she had raised. This distancing was also due to the reconfiguration of the local LGBT movement in response to the HIV epidemic. Following international prevention policies against the virus, the category of "men who have sex with men" (MSM) was established, within which the travestis were included. Berkins' ALITT group objected to this definition on the grounds that it undermined the fight for their identity, while ATTTA, on the other hand, requested and managed resources to finance prevention projects focused on MSM. These efforts by ATTTA occurred in parallel with its articulation with other local NGOs working on HIV/AIDS, such as Nexo and Fundación Buenos Aires Sida.

In 2004, OTTRA was dissolved following the death of Echazú, due to complications derived from HIV/AIDS.

==== 2005–present ====
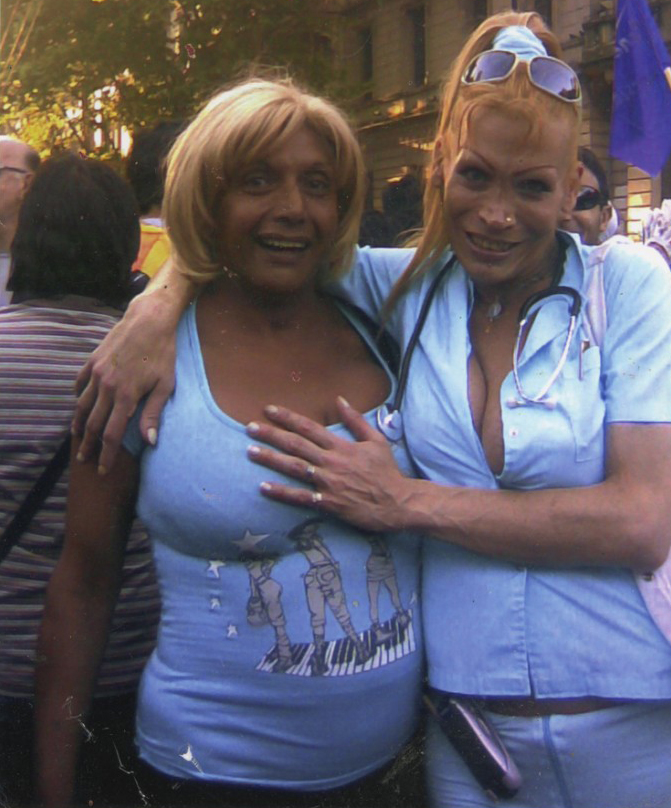
Two activists at the 2005 Buenos Aires Pride March

Today, ATTTA—which added two more "T"s for "transsexual" and "transgender" in its name—and ALITT are the two travesti activist groups with the longest trajectory and political incidence in the country.

Between 2010 and 2012, a judicial strategy was carried out jointly by ATTTA and the Federación Argentina LGBT (FALGBT; English: Argentine LGBT Federation) legal team, resulting in a series of judicial appeals that established precedent in the recognition of travesti and transgender identities. On May 9, 2012, the Argentine National Congress passed the Gender Identity Law (Spanish: Ley de Identidad de Género), which made the country one of the world's most progressive in terms of transgender rights. It allows people to officially change their gender identities without facing barriers such as hormone therapy, surgery, psychiatric diagnosis or judge approval. The law has been celebrated as a great victory for the local LGBT movement. Nevertheless, activist Marlene Wayar soon criticized the law claiming that travestis can only choose to change their legal gender to "female", a disacknowledgement of their perceived identity.

Since the implementation of the Gender Identity Law, there have been efforts by activists in search of the legal recognition of non-binary genders such as travesti. In early 2020, activist Lara Bertolini made news for claiming that her national ID should be legally registered as "travesti femininity" (Spanish: femineidad travesti). She initially obtained a favorable ruling from a Buenos Aires judge, which was later rejected by the Chamber of Appeals (Spanish: Cámara de Apelaciones), its three judges citing the Real Academia Española's official definition of "travesti" as their reasoning. In July 2021, the country became the first in Latin America to recognise non-binary gender identities in its national identification cards and passports, allowing to choose the letter X as a third option besides male (M) or female (F). The measure was criticized by various travesti and non-binary activists, who say that the letter X makes their identities invisible and that it actually reinforces the binary by othering them.

On June 24, 2021, the Argentine Senate passed the travesti-trans job quota law (Spanish: cupo laboral travesti-trans), which established that the state must hire at least 1 percent of the public administration staff to travesti and trans people. The official name of the law is Law for the Promotion of Access to Formal Employment for Travestis, Transsexuals and Transgender Persons "Diana Sacayán - Lohana Berkins" (Spanish: Ley de Promoción del Acceso al Empleo Formal para Personas Travestis, Transexuales y Transgénero "Diana Sacayán - Lohana Berkins").

=== Brazilian movement ===
Travesti activism—located within the broader transgender rights movement—has been marked by its tensions and differences with transsexual-identified groups. Historically, the creation of travesti organizations followed one of two models: on the one hand by self-organization and, on the other hand, from the action of NGOs linked to the homosexual movement or the movement against AIDS. In the late 1990s, gender identity-oriented activism emerged in Brazil, which adopted the terms "trans" and "transsexual" on the recommendation of foreign activists. The undertaking and demand for sex-reassignment surgery is recurrently used as a distinguishing factor between both groups, travestis being those who choose not alter their genitality. The Associação Nacional de Travestis e Transexuais (ANTRA; English: National Association of Travestis and Transsexuals) was founded in 2000 and remains the main organization of the transgender movement at the national level. As of 2003, travestis remained underrepresented within the broader LGBT movement, as well as in the growing Brazilian "pink market", since it emphasizes the aesthetics of masculine, gay men. As a result, the emerging Brazilian travesti movement of the 1990s and early 2000s has been developed mainly through AIDS-related funding, which resulted in the emergence of their own formal organizations, programs and venues. Travesti involvement in the Brazilian response to the HIV/AIDS pandemic dates to the mid-1980s, when São Paulo travesti Brenda Lee founded a support hospice for travestis living with the virus. The number of travesti-led and travesti-related programs in the country grew from a handful in the early 1990s to approximately twenty in the early 2000s. In a 1996 speech, Lair Guerra de Macedo Rodrigues—former Director of Brazil's National Program on Sexually Transmissible Diseases and AIDS—asserted: "The organization of travesti groups, especially following the advent of AIDS, is evidence of the beginning of the arduous task of defending citizenship."

In 2005, the transsexual-focused Coletivo Nacional de Transexuais (CNT; English: National Transsexual Collective) was founded, which progressively moved away from the spaces of the LGBT movement towards women's right groups. The CNT was the target of criticism and accusations of division within the trans movement, and was criticized by travesti activists for its "lack of political commitment". In December 2009, the XVI Encontro Nacional de Travestis e Transexuais (ENTLAIDS; English: XVI National Meeting of Travestis and Transsexuals)—held in Rio de Janeiro—was marked by an intense debate for the "political definition" of the categories "travesti" and "transsexual" within the broader transgender rights movement. It was held following the dissolution of the CNT and the subsequent involvement of many of its members with ANTRA. Activist Luana Muniz was the most recognized voice defending the travesti identity during the meeting, who pointed out the social class differences that are involved in the delimitation of the categories "travesti" and "transsexual". In 2018, Muniz defined being travesti as "being daring, having the pleasure of transgressing what they say is normal."

Other notable travesti activists include Majorie Marchi, Keila Simpson, Amara Moira, Indianara Siqueira, and Sofia Favero.

Unlike countries like Argentina, where there is a quota law for travesti and trans people in the public administration, Brazil is far from institutionalizing the labor inclusion of the trans community, although there are many travesti-led projects, such as Transgarçonne, an initiative of the Federal University of Rio de Janeiro; Capacitrans, founded by Andréa Brazil; and TransEmpregos, created by Márcia Rocha, the largest job platform for trans people in the country.

=== Chilean movement ===
On April 22, 1973, a group of young travestis gathered in the Plaza de Armas in Santiago, holding the first protest of sexual diversity in the history of Chile.

A key figure in the Chilean travesti movement and cultural scene is the poet Claudia Rodríguez, who began her activist career in the 1990s.

=== Paraguayan movement ===
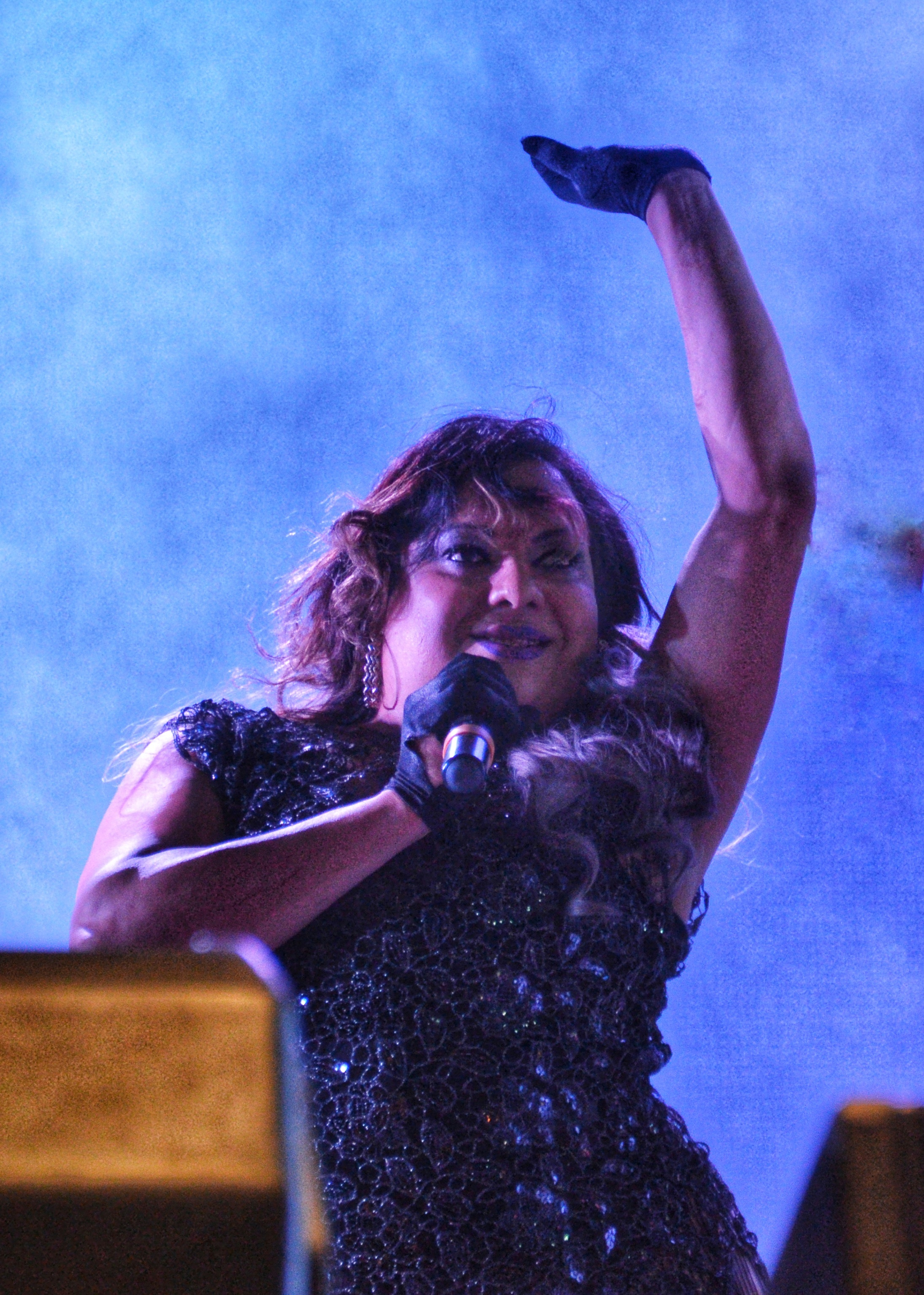
Leading travesti activist Yren Rotela in 2014

Paraguay is one of the most restrictive countries in the region with respect to the rights of transgender people. The first demonstrations of travestis and trans women took place in the late 1990s and early 2000s, mainly to defend their paradas (the places where sex work is carried out) and to protest police mistreatment and murder of their peers.

Yren Rotela is one of the leading figures of the Paraguayan movement for the rights of travesti, transgender and transsexual people, founding the Panambí association in 2009, which she chaired until 2017. She also inaugurated Casa Diversa in 2019, which in addition to being a home, is a community center for sexual diversity. When asked about her local references, she replied: "I can't forget the survivors of the dictatorship who taught me a lot: Liz Paola, Peter Balbuena, Carla. But above all, my murdered companions are always my great leaders, my greatest examples of struggle."

Other active travesti activists today are Alejandra Grange, Fabu Olmedo and Reny Davenport. At the international level, the main references of the movement are from Argentina, including Diana Sacayán, Lohana Berkins, Marlene Wayar, Marcela Romero, Diana Zurco, Camila Sosa Villada, Susy Shock and Alma Fernández. In a 2020 interview with Mexican independent media Kaja Negra, Alejandra Grange —founder of the Transitar organization and the Radio Travesti program—stated:

For me it is very important to say that I am a travesti because it is a word that was born in the Latin American context that we are resignifying because it was a medical term, a man who dresses as a woman to achieve sexual satisfaction and all those things. But it is not that. For me, when I tell you that I am a travesti, I am telling you that this is resistance, for me this is happiness, it is struggle, being with my friends, it is a way of saying japiró to the system, [a Guaraní expression of anger and rage] go to hell, because I can exist within all of this.

=== Uruguayan movement ===
Uruguayan travesti activism emerged in the 1990s, during the neoliberal presidencies of Luis Alberto Lacalle and Julio María Sanguinetti, which "promoted a subordinate integration model of sexual dissidence anchored in the notion of toleration". In this context, the claims of the Mesa Coordinadora Travesti (English: Travesti Coordinating Board) and later the Asociación Trans del Uruguay (English: Uruguayan Trans Association), focused on the conquest of "negative rights": the end of discrimination and of police persecution. In 2002, the law on sex work was passed, legalizing the activity and undermining police surveillance in the streets. During the progressive governments of the Frente Amplio, the conquest of "positive rights" was achieved: in 2009 a law was approved that allows changing the gender and name in the identification documents and, in 2018, the Ley Integral para Personas Trans (English: "Comprehensive Law for Trans People") was approved. Writing for La Diaria in 2020, Diego Sempol and Karina Pankievich pointed out that "the debates on the [Ley Integral para Personas Trans] were written in stone in the social imaginary and formatted trans memories in the public sphere," leading to the appearance of a series of testimonies that "broke a prolonged silence that put into discussion the recent Uruguayan past and the official accounts of state violence [during the civic-military dictatorship]".

== See also ==
- Archivo de la Memoria Trans
- Feminist anthropology
- Feminist views on prostitution
- Feminist views on transgender topics
- History of cross-dressing
- HIV/AIDS in Latin America
- List of people killed for being transgender
- List of people with non-binary gender identities
- LGBT linguistics
- LGBT people in prison
- LGBT rights in the Americas
- LGBT stereotypes
- Outline of transgender topics
- Postfeminism
- Timeline of transgender history
- Trans bashing
- Transmedicalism
- Transgender health care

== Bibliography ==
- Falabella, Florencia; Augsten, Erwing; Recalde, Lorena; Orué Pozzo, Aníbal (2017). Mujeres trans y ciudadanía sexual. Derechos de salud y educación (PDF) (in Spanish). Centro de Estudios Rurales (CERI), Consejo Nacional de Ciencia y Tecnología (CONACYT). Asunción: Arandurã. ISBN 978-999-675-379-4.
- Bertolini, Lara María (2020). Soberanía travesti: una identidad argentina (in Spanish). Buenos Aires: Acercandonos Cultura. ISBN 978-987-4400-55-0.
- Fernández, Josefina (2004). Cuerpos desobedientes: travestismo e identidad de género (in Spanish). Buenos Aires: Edhasa. ISBN 950-9009-16-4.
- Fernández, Josefina (2020). La Berkins: Una combatiente de frontera (in Spanish). Buenos Aires: Editorial Sudamericana. ISBN 978-950-076-392-9.
- Kulick, Don (1998). Travesti: Sex, Gender and Culture among Brazilian Transgendered Prostitutes. Worlds of Desire: The Chicago Series on Sexuality, Gender, and Culture. University of Chicago Press. ISBN 978-022-646-099-4.
- Raíces Montero, Jorge Horacio, ed. (2015). Un cuerpo, mil sexos: intersexualidades. Fichas para el siglo XXI (in Spanish). Buenos Aires: Topía Editorial. ISBN 978-987-118-542-9.
