= Favero =

Favero is an Italian surname. Notable people with the surname include:

- Luciano Favero (born 1957), Italian footballer
- Mafalda Favero (1903–1981), Italian opera singer
- Silvio Favero (1966–2021), Brazilian politician
- Sofia Favero (born 1993), Brazilian politician
- Vito Favero (1932–2014), Italian cyclist
