= Rotela =

Rotela is a surname. Notable people with the surname include:

- Angel Martínez Rotela (born 1983), Paraguayan footballer
- Yren Rotela (born 1981), Paraguayan activist for the rights of LGBT people and sex workers
