= Camila Sosa Villada =

Argentine actress

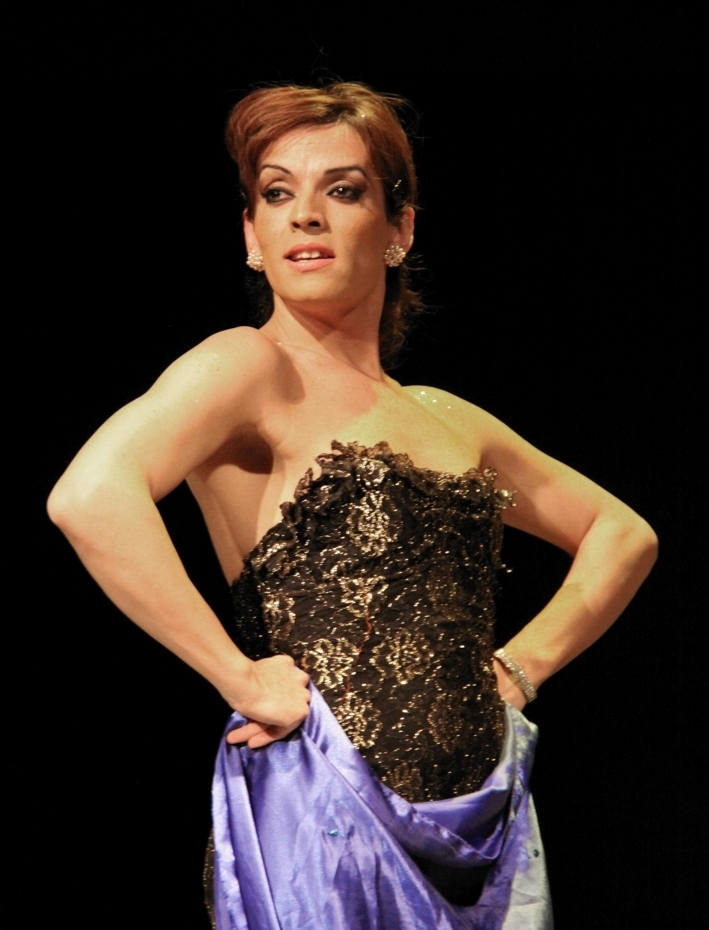
- Camila Sosa Villada in the play 'Llórame un río' in 2013.
- Born: 28 January 1982 (age 44); La Falda, Argentina
- Education: National University of Córdoba
- Occupations: Actress, writer, singer
- Notable work: Las malas (2019)

Camila Sosa Villada (born 28 January 1982) is a transgender Argentine writer and theatre, film, and television actress.

== Biography ==
On 28 January 1982, Camilia Sosa Villada was born in La Falda, Argentina, 80 kilometers (50 mi) from the city of Córdoba. Throughout her childhood, she moved around the Córdoba Province, living in a number of cities including Cruz del Eje, Los Sauces, Mina Clavero, and Córdoba.

When I was a young girl, I imagined I'd do acting, theatre, films; I never imagined I'd make a living from it. I began dressing as a girl when I was 16, in a town of 5000 inhabitants. I know very well what it was like being a travesti in a town like that 20 years ago. It was twice as hard as it is now. Nowadays, those who dress as girls have no idea what we went through - it was very painful. Luckily, the way has been paved for them.

— Camila Sosa Villada

She studied for three years of Social Communication at the National University of Córdoba's School of Information Sciences and another four years for her bachelor's degree at the same university.

In 2009, Villada premiered her play Carnes tolendas, retrato escénico de un travesti (Carnes Tolendas, an on-stage portrayal of a travesti), a biodrama of her life which fused her personal experiences that she recorded on her blog, La Novia de Sandro [Sandro's Girlfriend], with the poetry of Federico García Lorca. The play, directed by María Palacios and revised by Paco Giménez, was selected for the 2010 National Theater Festival held in La Plata.

In 2011, Javier van de Couter, filmmaker, actor, scriptwriter and author of the script of the Argentine drama miniseries Tumberos, cast Sosa Villada in a minor role in the film Mía, but later offered her the starring role after watching her in Carnes tolendas in Córdoba.

By word of mouth, my name reached the director Javier van de Couter, who was in the process of casting for his debut film. [...] They realised that I was much younger than they had expected. They had already chosen the main actress, but they liked my work. It seems I took her place. [...] The director is very young and full of talent. The film has a beautiful story. It's about a gay village which existed in Buenos Aires, behind the University district, inhabited by travestis and gays. They tore it down in 1998. [...] Ale is a travesti who scavenges and sells materials. She makes friends with a girl from a middle class family who is in need of help, as her mother committed suicide. Her father, played by Rodrigo de la Serna, feels lost in life. Unable to overcome his situation, he turns to alcohol. [...] Acting on film is a new experience for me. Cinema has a different rhythm, and brings a different kind of satisfaction. Theatre brings immediate gratification in every way: an organic satisfaction, and satisfaction from the audience. With cinema, you're at the service of an image. [...] The director and I began sending emails to each other. By intuition, I proposed to him that I play Ale with a melancholic expression. I suggested she life in constant disappointment, and we began to bring that to life. The good thing was that we spend a month rehearsing, and each department (costume, makeup) worked hard to contribute to the film.

— Camila Sosa Villada

In March 2010, the actress spent several months in Buenos Aires working with the Rojas Cultural Centre, which has a department for works relating to gender. Sosa Villada had the chance to perform Carnes tolendas in May 2010. She performed a sold-out show in the Buenos Aires International Festival (FIBA), which was well received by critics.

Filming for Mía finished on 15 May 2010. She then spent another 15 days recording the dubbing for her character.

In June 2010, Carnes tolendas was selected to be shown at the Theatre Students Bicentennial, a festival which brings together theatre students from all over the country.

In 2012, Sosa Villada starred in the La viuda de Rafael (The Widow of Rafael), a miniseries which consisted of 13 episodes, which was aired from November to December that same year. She starred as Nina, the transsexual wife of a wealthy businessman (played by Luis Machín) who, after her husband dies in an accident, must fight for what's hers against her spiteful in-laws.

As an actress, I feel privileged to have played a starring role on TV, as it's something which few actresses (and even fewer transgender actresses) get the chance to do. [...] That speaks volumes about our country and our government, that's clear. Above all, it says a lot about the organizations which have fought for everything we have managed to achieve with regards to rights and diversity. We are light years ahead of other countries in terms of social development - even first world countries, if we compare legislation related to diversity and gender. Our government is setting an example, and we hope that it spreads to all sectors of our society like an unstoppable virus, allowing diversity to bloom.

— Camila Sosa Villada

On 7 August 2013, the Argentine Government granted her a new national identity card (DNI), updated with the name Camila Sosa Villada and the gender she identifies as.

Thirty one years ago, my parents had a son [...] I made dolls and robots, and when I was alone, I'd put on my mother's makeup. I'd secretly fall in love with my classmates and my teachers. I was a child that was suddenly faced with many sorrows all at once. I never managed to learn how to go to the bathroom standing up, and my father had already begun to be hostile towards me. [...] Now I am split between the past, between the man I was and am proud to have been, even though I had always known that, at some point, I was going to end up putting on a dress and a pair of high heels. Now, exactly half of me is made up of the present, and the other half, the past. There's no doubt that I'll live the rest of my life as Camila, but I'll never, in any way, be made to erase that boy from my memory - the boy that spent his school recess alone, watching how the others had their feast served to them; the boy who wasn't allowed to cry, who couldn't ask for help, who couldn't do anything for himself.

— Camila Sosa Villada

== Work ==
=== Stage ===
Sources: Alternative Teatral

Year	Show	Notes
2009	Carnes tolendas, retrato escénico de un travesti [Carnes tolendas, an on-stage portrait of a travesti]	Shown in theatres in Córdoba.
2010	El errante, los sueños del centauro [The Wanderer, the Dreams of the Centaur]	Play written by Jorge Villegas, which recounts the story of Manuel Baigorria (1809–1875)
2011	Evocaciones dramáticas sobre Tita Merello y Billie Holiday, o Llórame un río... [Dramatic evocations about Tita Merello and Billie Holiday, or Cry Me a River...]	
2014	El bello indiferente [Le Bel Indifférent]	Play written by Jean Cocteau, directed by Javier Van de Couter, starring Hervé Segata.
2015	Los ríos del olvido [The Rivers of Oblivion]	
2015	Despierta Corazón Dormido/ Frida [Awaken Sleeping Heart/Frida]	
2016	Putx madre	Directed by and starring Camila Sosa Villada.
2017	El cabaret de la Difunta Correa. [The Difunta Correa's Cabaret]	

=== Film ===
Year	Title	Notes
2005	La vereda de la calle Roma [The Sidewalk of Rome Street]	Starred as protagonist.
2009	Camila, desde el alma [Camila, from the Soul]	Feature-length documentary, directed by Norma Fernández, starring Sosa Villada as herself, winner of the best documentary prize at the 'Diversa 2010' Cinema Festival.
2011	Mía [Mine]	Film directed by Javier van de Couter, starring Rodrigo de la Serna y Maite Lanata. Awards and nominations: Winner of best script in the New Latin American Cinema International Festival in La Habana, Cuba (2011).; Shown as a part of International Discoveries at the 60th International Film Festival, Mannheim–Heiderlberg, Germany (2011).; Best Film and Audience awards at Puerto Rico Queer Film Festival (2012); Best Foreign Language Feature prize at the Mix Brasil Film Festival, São Paulo, Brasil (2012).; Grand Prize Cine Latino and Best First Picture awards at the Wine Country Film Festival, Santa Rosa, California (2012).; Jury Prize at the Chéries Chéris Lesbian and Gay Film Festival, Paris, France (2012).; Winner of the Maguey prize at the International Film Festival, Guadalajara, Mexico (2012).
2024	Tesis sobre una domesticación [Thesis on a Domestication]	Director: Javier van de Couter; Awards: Gold Q-Hugo at Chicago Film Festival (2024); Special Mention, Out-Look Competition at Chicago Film Festival (2024)

=== Television ===
Year	Title	Notes
2012	La viuda de Rafael [The Widow of Rafael]	Miniseries starring Camila Sosa Villada as the protagonist, in which she also sings the show's opening theme song.
2013	Historia clínica [Medical History]	Feature-length documentary, directed by Norma Fernández, starring Sosa Villada as herself. Winner of the best documentary prize at the 'Diversa 2010' Cinema Festival.
2014	La celebración [The Celebration]	

=== Literature ===
Year	Title	Notes
2015	La novia de Sandro [Sandro's Girlfriend]	Poetry book.
2018	El Viaje Inútil [The Useless Journey]	Autobiography.
2019	Las malas [Bad Girls]	Novel.
2019	Tesis sobre la domesticación [Essays on Domestication]	Novel.
2022	Soy una tonta por quererte [I'm a fool for loving you]	Short Stories.

== Awards ==
Sosa Villada has received the following awards as an actress and singer:
- Awarded best stage actress by the Municipality of Cordoba.
- Special mention at the Teatro del Mundo awards in Buenos Aires for Carnes tolendas, retrato escénico de un travesti.
- Recognised for her contribution to theatre by the Legislative Authority of the Province of Córdoba.
- Honoured by the Secretariat for Human Rights of the Province of Córdoba.

== See also ==
- Theatre in Argentina
- Cinema in Argentina
- Travesti (gender identity)
- Transgender
- LGBT rights in Argentina
