= Bad Girls (Sosa Villada novel) =

2019 novel by Camila Sosa Villada

- Cover of the first edition of the book, featuring a photograph of the Archivo de la Memoria Trans.
- Author: Camila Sosa Villada
- Language: Spanish
- Genre: Semi-autobiographical novel
- Set in: Córdoba, Argentina
- Published: Tusquets Editores
- Publication date: March 1, 2019
- Publication place: Argentina
- Media type: Print (paperback)
- Pages: 228
- Awards: Sor Juana Inés de la Cruz Prize (2020); Premio de Narrativa en Castellano (2021); Grand Prix de l'Héroïne (2021)
- ISBN: 978-987-670-481-6 (first edition, paperback)

Bad Girls (Spanish: Las malas) is the first novel by Argentine author Camila Sosa Villada, first published in Argentina on March 1, 2019, by Barcelona-based book publisher Tusquets Editores, which later published it in Spain on June 9, 2020. The story is set in the Argentine city of Córdoba and focuses on the lives of a group of trans women who work as street prostitutes at Sarmiento Park, among which is the narrator herself.

The book has been a critical and commercial success. It has been translated into several languages.

In October 2020, Las malas received the Sor Juana Inés de la Cruz Prize given by the Guadalajara International Book Fair. The book was also awarded the Grand Prix de l'Héroïne given by Madame Figaro and the Premio de Narrativa en Castellano given by Barcelona bookstore Finestres.

The novel will be adapted into a television series by Armando Bó.

== Plot ==
Las Malas is a fictional autobiographical work that goes back and forth in Camila's life. She writes her life experiences from her childhood in La Falda as an outcast boy, the only child of a lower-middle-class marriage, until her life in the city of Córdoba which she shared with a new family under the maternal wings of Auntie Encarna. The novel is mainly set in 2002 and it is narrated by the author and protagonist. The stories are about the difficulties that she encountered during her entire life as a transgender woman, but they are also about the lives of the group of sex workers (mostly fellow trans women) that she meets at Sarmiento Park.

== Themes and literary analysis ==
The novel explores topics such as differences among socioeconomic classes, the atrocities committed against trans women working in the streets, and the struggle that transgender children go through, portraying violence and trauma in an intimate tone.

Las Malas has several elements of magical realism, blurring the line between fantasy and reality by depicting the oddities and the dreary realities the trans characters go through along with supernatural phenomena.

== Main characters ==
- Camila Sosa Villada: Writer and protagonist of the novel.
- Auntie Encarna: The oldest one of the group, the adoptive mother. She is the owner of the pink house, the shelter where everyone in the group of travestis that worked on the Sarmiento Park went.
- La Machi: The healer and the practitioner of black magic. She was born in Paraguay.
- María la Muda: She is deaf and dumb. She transforms herself into a bird. “Auntie Encarna” gave her shelter and rescued her.
- Claudia Huergo: Camila 's mother. She became the mother of Camila at a very young age and was a housewife.
- Carlos Quinteros: Camila 's father. An alcoholic and violent person who is not willing to accept Camila as a transgender person.
- Laura: The only one cis woman of the group. She is pregnant with twins.
- Nadina: Male Nurse by day, woman by night. She only wears women's clothes at night at Sarmiento Park.
- Natalí: Half wolf, half woman (wolf woman). She is the seventh son of her family and at night she transforms into a wolf.
- The Bright of The Eyes (El Brillo de los Ojos): The baby they find in the park. He becomes Encarna's son.
- Sandra: The most melancholic one. She was bitten by her clients and her boyfriend.
- Aunt Silvia: A vagrant woman who had a lot of dogs. She had her legs amputated because of diabetes.
- The Ravens: Spoiled and rich boys who go to work at Sarmiento Park even though they don't need the money. They steal the clients from the girls who are struggling to make ends meet.
- Angie: The most beautiful one. She was from Alta Gracia, Córdoba. She had a boyfriend who worked on constructions, the most beautiful man.

== Translations ==
- Croatian: Loše djevojke. Translated by Nikolina Židek. Zagreb: Udruga Domino. 2020. ISBN 9789537730277.
- Italian: Le cattive. Translated by Giulia Zavagna. Rome: Edizioni SUR. 2021. ISBN 8869982815.
- French: Les vilaines. Translated by Laura Alcoba. Paris: Éditions Métailié. 2021. ISBN 9791022610797.
- German: Im Park der prächtigen Schwestern, lit. 'In the Park of the Magnificent Sisters'. Translated by Svenja Becker. Berlin: Suhrkamp Verlag. 2021. ISBN 9783518471180.
- Swedish: Nattdjur, lit. 'Nocturnal Animal'. Translated by Linnea Rutström. Stockholm: Prosak Förlag. 2021. ISBN 9789198684728.
- Portuguese: O parque das irmãs magníficas, lit. 'The Park of Magnificent Sisters'. Translated by Joca Reiners Terron. São Paulo: Crítica & Tusquets. ISBN 9786555354089.
- Dutch: Valse krengen, lit. 'Fake Bitches'. Translated by Irene van de Mheen. Amsterdam: De Bezige Bij. 2023. ISBN 9789403129686.
- Czech: Potvory. Translated by Anna Štádlerová. Praha: Argo. 2024. ISBN 9788025746349.
- Finnish: Yöeläimiä. Translated by Emmi Ketonen. Helsinki: S&S. 2024. ISBN 9789515260642.

== See also ==
- Transgender literature
