= Richard G. Parker (anthropologist) =

Richard Guy Parker
- Born: 1956 (age 69–70)
- Scientific career
- Fields: Public health
- Institutions: Mailman School of Public Health, Columbia University

Richard Guy Parker (born 1956) is a professor of sociomedical sciences, anthropology, and arts and sciences at the Mailman School of Public Health, Columbia University, where he received an award for teaching excellence in 2004. He serves as director of the university's Center for the Study of Culture, Politics, and Health.

Parker received a bachelor's degree (BA, 1980), a master's degree (MA, 1981), and a doctorate (PhD, 1988) from the University of California.

Parker is editor-in-chief of the public health journal Global Public Health.

== Works ==
- Parker, Richard G.; Sommer, Marni (2011). Routledge handbook of global public health. Abingdon, Oxon: Routledge. ISBN 978-0415778480. OCLC 649795921. (edited book)
- Aggleton, Peter; Parker, Richard G. (2010). Routledge handbook of sexuality, health and rights. London: Routledge. ISBN 978-0415468640. OCLC 428770798. (edited book)
- Parker, Richard G. (2009). Bodies, pleasures, and passions: sexual culture in contemporary Brazil (2nd ed.). Nashville, TN: Vanderbilt University Press. ISBN 978-0826516756. OCLC 436613604. (original edition 1991, OCLC 21870583)
- Parker, Richard G.; Aggleton, Peter (2002). HIV and AIDS-related stigma and discrimination a conceptual framework and implications for action. Vol. 57. [Rio de Janeiro]: Brazilian Interdisciplinary AIDS Association. pp. 13–24. doi:10.1016/s0277-9536(02)00304-0. ISBN 978-8588684058. OCLC 60854872. PMID 12753813.
- Parker, Richard (2001). "Sexuality, Culture, and Power in HIV/AIDS Research". Annual Review of Anthropology. 30: 163–179. doi:10.1146/annurev.anthro.30.1.163. JSTOR 3069213.
- Parker, Richard G.; Barbosa, Regina Maria; Aggleton, Peter (2000). Framing the sexual subject: the politics of gender, sexuality, and power. Berkeley, CA: University of California Press. ISBN 9780520218369. OCLC 716452577. (edited book)
- Parker, Richard Guy (1999). Beneath the Equator: Cultures of Desire, Male Homosexuality, and Emerging Gay Communities in Brazil. Routledge, an imprint of Taylor & Francis. ISBN 978-1136669958. OCLC 38765158.
- Parker, Richard G.; Barbosa, Regina Maria (1996). Sexualidades brasileiras. Rio de Janeiro, Brazil: Relume Dumará. ISBN 978-8573160895. OCLC 36806818. (Portuguese)
- Parker, Richard G.; Gagnon, John H. (1995). Conceiving sexuality: approaches to sex research in a postmodern world. New York: Routledge. ISBN 978-0415909273. OCLC 30544272. (edited book)
