= Global Public Health (journal) =

- Discipline: Public health
- Language: English
- Edited by: Richard G. Parker

Publication details
- History: 2006–present
- Publisher: Taylor & Francis
- Frequency: 10/year
- Impact factor: 2.396 (2020)

Standard abbreviations
- ISO 4: Glob. Public Health

Indexing
- ISSN: 1744-1692 (print); 1744-1706 (web)
- LCCN: 2006205961
- OCLC no.: 64706686

Links
- Journal homepage; Online access; Online archive

Global Public Health is a peer-reviewed public health journal published by Taylor & Francis and established in 2006. The editor-in-chief is Richard G. Parker (Mailman School of Public Health).

== Abstracting and indexing ==
The journal is abstracted and indexed in:

- Applied Social Sciences Index and Abstracts
- CINAHL
- Current Contents/Social & Behavioral Sciences
- Educational Research Abstracts Online
- EMBASE
- International Bibliography of the Social Sciences
- Index Medicus/MEDLINE/PubMed
- PsycINFO
- Psychological Abstracts
- Public Affairs Information Service
- Scopus
- Social Sciences Citation Index
- Studies on Women and Gender Abstracts

According to the Journal Citation Reports, the journal has a 2020 impact factor of 2.396.
