= Buenos Aires Carnival =

Annual event in Buenos Aires, Argentina

The Buenos Aires Carnival (Spanish: Carnaval de Buenos Aires or Corso de Buenos Aires) is an annual event that takes place during the Carnival festivities, usually at the end of February, on the streets of Buenos Aires, Argentina. The two-day event features murga parades, colourful costumes, water bombs and many other amusement activities.

During the 20th century, the Carnavales at Avenida de Mayo (de Mayo Avenue) were very popular, but they were discontinued first during the military government of the 1970s, and then during the 1990s. Mayor Aníbal Ibarra promoted the comeback of carnival (mainly into the barrios) in the mid-2000s, and the Avenida de Mayo show returned in 2006.

Starting in 2012, Carnival dates are considered public holidays.
