= Yren Rotela =

Paraguayan activist (born 1981)

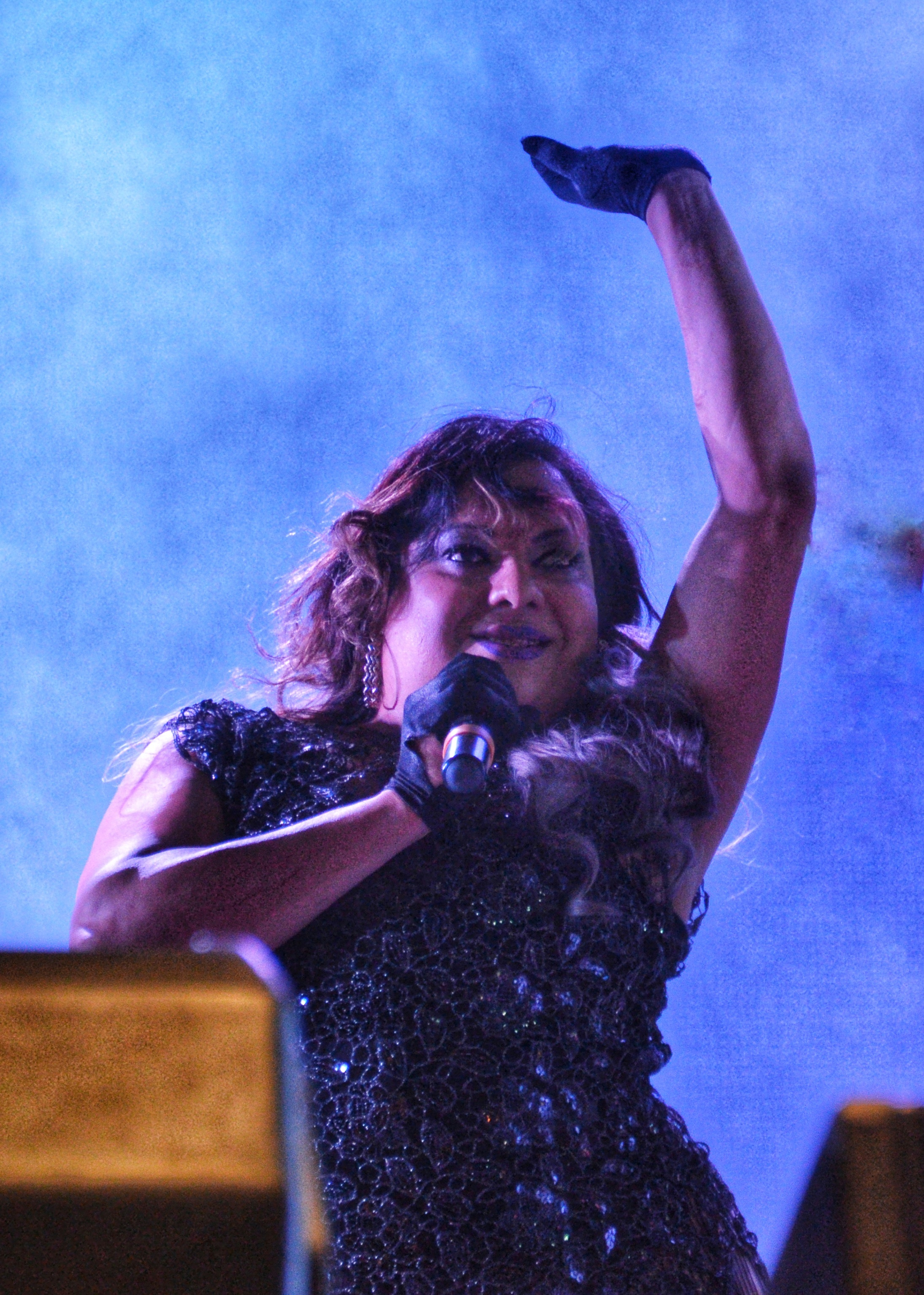
- Born: 9 January 1981 (age 45); Asunción, Paraguay
- Occupation: Activist
- Political party: Kuña Pyrenda Movement
- Awards: Peter Benenson Award

Yren Ailyn Rotela Ramirez (born 9 January 1981) is a Paraguayan activist for the rights of LGBT people and sex workers.

== Biography ==
Yren Rotela was born on 9 January 1981 in the Obrero neighborhood of Asunción, Paraguay. She is the second of seven siblings. She came out as a trans woman at age 14, after which she was expelled from school.

== Professional career ==
In 1999, an instance of police repression against sex workers prompted Rotela to dedicate herself to activism, publicly denouncing the abuses and extortion that affect this community. As a sex worker, she began to organize with her colleagues, and in 2007, she co-founded Panambí: Association of Transvestite, Transsexual, and Transgender People, which adopted its charter in 2008 and obtained legal status in 2009. She served as its president for two terms, from 2012 to 2016. Through Panambí, Yren Rotela denounced violations and promoted the rights and grievances of trans people.

She is a leader of the Federation of Women of Paraguay, a member of the María Rivarola Healthcare Rights Movement, of the Forum for Education, the UN Women Advisory Group of Civil Society in Paraguay, the 8M Paraguay movement, and is the national and international head of the Lactrans Network of Latin America and the Caribbean.

In 2015, Amnesty International granted her the Peter Benenson Award for the defense of human rights "for her tireless work in favor of the dignity of [transvestite, transsexual, and transgender people] in Paraguay, her contribution to the visibility of the drama that this collective lives through in the absence of justice and impunity in hate crimes and other serious abuses of human rights."

On 17 March 2015, during meeting No. 154 of the Inter-American Court of Human Rights, she was part of the delegation that presented the results of the report "Denuncias de actos de violencia e impunidad contra personas trans en Paraguay" (Reports of Acts of Violence and Impunity Against Trans People in Paraguay), carried out by the Panambí association.

Together with Tamara Amarilla, Gabriela Espinoza, and Mariana Sepúlveda, she was appointed as a facilitator of the National System of Judicial Facilitators (SNFJ) in December 2016. Being part of this structure allowed her to advocate for people who need guidance, acting as a link between them and public institutions.

Rotela participated in the 47th General Assembly of the Organization of American States, held in Cancún, Mexico, as the Paraguayan representative of the Trans Persons Network of Latin America and the Caribbean (Redlactrans). In the Assembly, the Paraguayan chancellor opposed the approval of an article on the rights of LGBT persons.

In September 2017, Rotela gave the talk "¿Nos define el sexo?" (Does sex define us?) on the Gramo conversation platform.

She was a candidate on the Kuña Pyrenda Movement's list for the Senate in the 2018 Paraguayan general election. Part of her platform was based on "recognizing the gender identity of trans people, access to economic, social, cultural, civil, and political rights for the entire LGBT community, and the approval of a law against all forms of discrimination."

In July 2018, she was invited by the United States government to participate in the International Visitor Leadership Program (IVLP), the State Department's main professional exchange program.

== Name change ==
In December 2016, through a civil trial, Yren Rotela became the first trans person, together with Mariana Sepúlveda, to present a request to change her name in Paraguay. Five months later, on 11 May 2017, she received a favorable opinion from the Civil and Commercial Judge Julia Rosa Alonso Martínez. Under Article 25 of the Constitution of Paraguay, the case marked a milestone in the country's jurisprudence. However the Prosecutor's Office appealed the measure, and the case is still before the Chamber of Civil Appeals; In 2022, still not being able to change their names, they decided to take the matter to the UN.

As of October 2017, Paraguay does not have a gender identity or anti-discrimination law.

== See also ==
- LGBT rights in Paraguay
