= Sofia Favero =

Brazilian politician (born 1993)

Member of the Legislative Assembly of São Paulo
- Incumbent
- Assumed office 1 February 2027

Personal details
- Born: 3 August 1993 (age 33)
- Party: Socialism and Liberty Party

Sofia Favero Ricardo (born 3 August 1993) is a Brazilian politician who was elected member of the Legislative Assembly of São Paulo in 2026. She previously worked as a legislative assistant in the Municipal Chamber of São Paulo.

== Biography ==
Born in Aracaju on 3 August 1993, Favero graduated in psychology from Faculdade Pio Décimo in Sergipe, and earned her master's and doctoral degrees in social and institutional psychology from the Federal University of Rio Grande do Sul.

In 2025, she worked as a parliamentary advisor for councilwoman Amanda Paschoal, of the PSOL party, in the city of São Paulo, before running for her first election in 2026, with the support of Congresswoman Erika Hilton. In her campaign for state deputy, she supported the Unified Health System (SUS), the Psychosocial Care Network, and public education.

In the elections of 4 October 2026, she was elected to the Legislative Assembly of São Paulo, scheduled to begin on 1 February 2027. With 99.99% of the votes counted, she had 407,742 votes and occupied third place among the candidates for state representative in the state.
