= Claudia Castrosín Verdú =

Argentine LGBT activist

- Born: Claudia Roxana Castrosín Verdú; La Plata, Argentina
- Other names: Claudia Castro
- Occupations: Activist, public employee
- Spouse: Flavia Massenzio (2010–present)

Claudia Roxana Castrosín Verdú, also known as Claudia Castro, is an Argentine LGBT activist. She presides over La Fulana, an organization that supports lesbian and bisexual women, and is also the vice president of the Argentine Lesbian, Gay, Bisexual, and Trans Federation (FALGBT), through which she has contributed to laws sanctioning same-sex marriage, gender identity, and medically assisted reproduction. In 2007 she presented, together with María Rachid, her partner at the time, the first judicial protection for declaring the unconstitutionality of two articles of the civil code that prevented marriage between people of the same sex. After the approval of the Equal Marriage Law in 2010, she married Flavia Massenzio and adopted a daughter, Estefanía.

Castrosín used the name Claudia Castro for twelve years to "protect" her parents, until in 2010 she decided to present herself with her two last names. In 2012, the Buenos Aires City Legislature named her "Outstanding Personality in the field of Human Rights", following a Rachid project.

== Activism ==
After arriving in Buenos Aires, Castrosín Verdú joined La Fulana, a support association for lesbians and bisexual women. There she met María Rachid, with whom she began to talk to the media, and contracted a civil union on 21 August 2003, becoming the first women in Latin America to do so. A year earlier, both had founded the LGBT newspaper Queer, which would be relaunched in 2009 as the LGBT Federation newsletter. Beginning in 2007, she began a campaign in favor of the Equal Marriage Law. In February, Rachid and Castro went to the civil registry to take their turns to get married, accompanied by María José Lubertino (then president of INADI), several deputies, lawyers, and a clerk. When their request was rejected, they filed the first judicial protection in Argentina and Latin America to declare the unconstitutionality of two articles of the civil code that prevented marriage between persons of the same sex. The case reached the Supreme Court of Argentina, and was also presented before the Inter-American Court of Human Rights. Regarding marriage equality, the activist said, "Marriage will not make our love more important, nor will it make it exist or not exist. What marriage is going to do is to recognize rights," and that for her it meant "dignity". In 2010 she participated in the beginning of the debate on the Law of Equal Marriage in the Argentine Senate and said, "We are the same as you, but we do not have the same rights. [...] We are and we exist; we get tired of being on the left of zero."

She is currently president of La Fulana, vice president of the Argentine Lesbian, Gay, Bisexual, and Trans Federation (FALGBT), and a member of the National Women's Council and the National Bureau for Equality that unites the National Front for Equality with the Evita Movement. She collaborated on the promotion of laws on medically assisted reproduction and gender identity, the introduction of days of "lesbian visibility" and "rights of trans people", and the creation of the Women's Parliament, for which she is an alternate authority. In 2012 she participated in the first Lesbian, Gay, Bisexual, and Trans Pride Week of Misiones Province and said, "I would like to go through life not only with the lesbian flag." Regarding the Gender Identity Law, she said that, "It is the best in the world, the most revolutionary in the last 200 years." Regarding the Medically Assisted Reproduction Law, she participated in the commission debates and expressed, "For us, access to techniques of assisted human reproduction constitutes an aspect of the content of the human right to health."

In 2012, for a Rachid project, she was named "Outstanding Personality in the field of Human Rights" by the Buenos Aires City Legislature. Esteban Paulón, president of FALGBT, mentioned her as "an indisputable reference in what makes the struggle of lesbians and bisexual women for visibility and against violence."

== Personal life ==
Raised in La Plata, Claudia Castrosín Verdú became involved with social work at a young age. While engaged to her boyfriend, she met an openly lesbian woman, of whom she became a friend. The activist commented that at that moment it hit her "that someone could be a lesbian" and that lesbians "disgusted" her. Eventually she fell in love with her friend and they were a couple for two years. Her sexuality was not accepted by her family at first, and for twelve years she presented herself as "Claudia Castro" to "not embarrass" and "protect" her parents. At 23 she moved to Buenos Aires to "live her sexuality freely," in what she called a "lesbian exile".

After being in a relationship with María Rachid and following the sanction of the Law of Equal Marriage, she married Flavia Massenzio, also a lesbian activist, with whom she has a daughter named Estefanía. The couple is currently undergoing assisted reproduction treatment.
