= Federación Argentina de Lesbianas, Gays, Bisexuales y Trans =

LGBTQ rights organization in Argentina

Argentine Federation of Lesbians, Gays, Bisexuals and Trans
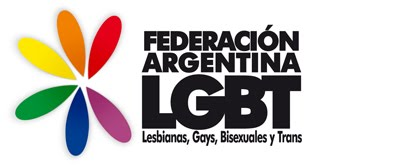
- Formation: 2005
- Type: NGO
- Headquarters: Tte. Gral. Juan Domingo Perón 683 4º "A", Buenos Aires
- President: Flavia Massenzio
- Vice President: Matías de Volder
- Website: falgbt.org

The Federación Argentina de Lesbianas, Gays, Bisexuales y Trans ("Argentine Federation of Lesbians, Gays, Bisexuals and Trans"; FALGBT) is a non-governmental organization, non-profit, and one of the biggest LGBTQ organizations in Argentina. Founded by five organizations in 2005 (La Fulana, Fundación Buenos Aires SIDA, NEXO, ATTTA and VOX Asociación Civil) in Rosario, it currently brings together more than 150 organizations from across the country. It has been a member of ILGA since 2006. Since its founding, it has been presided over by María Rachid, Esteban Paulón, Marcela Romero, and is currently presided over by Dr. Flavia Massenzio.

== Same-sex marriage law ==
=== Court rulings ===
Starting in 2007, the FALGBT pursued a legal strategy of filing amparo actions in the courts, seeking a declaration of unconstitutionality of the articles of the Civil Code that prevented same-sex couples from exercising the right to marry.

The first amparo was filed by FALGBT president María Rachid together with her partner Claudia Castro. The case was elevated by extraordinary appeal to the Supreme Court of Justice of the Nation, which ruled in its favor, although it did not need to issue a ruling as Congress approved the reform of the Civil Code.

Using this same legal strategy, the FALGBT supported a series of amparo cases across the country that resulted in a total of nine same-sex marriages being performed through judicial authorization prior to the passage of the law — the first of which took place in Ushuaia on 28 December 2009, making it the first same-sex civil marriage in Latin America and the Caribbean.

=== The new law ===
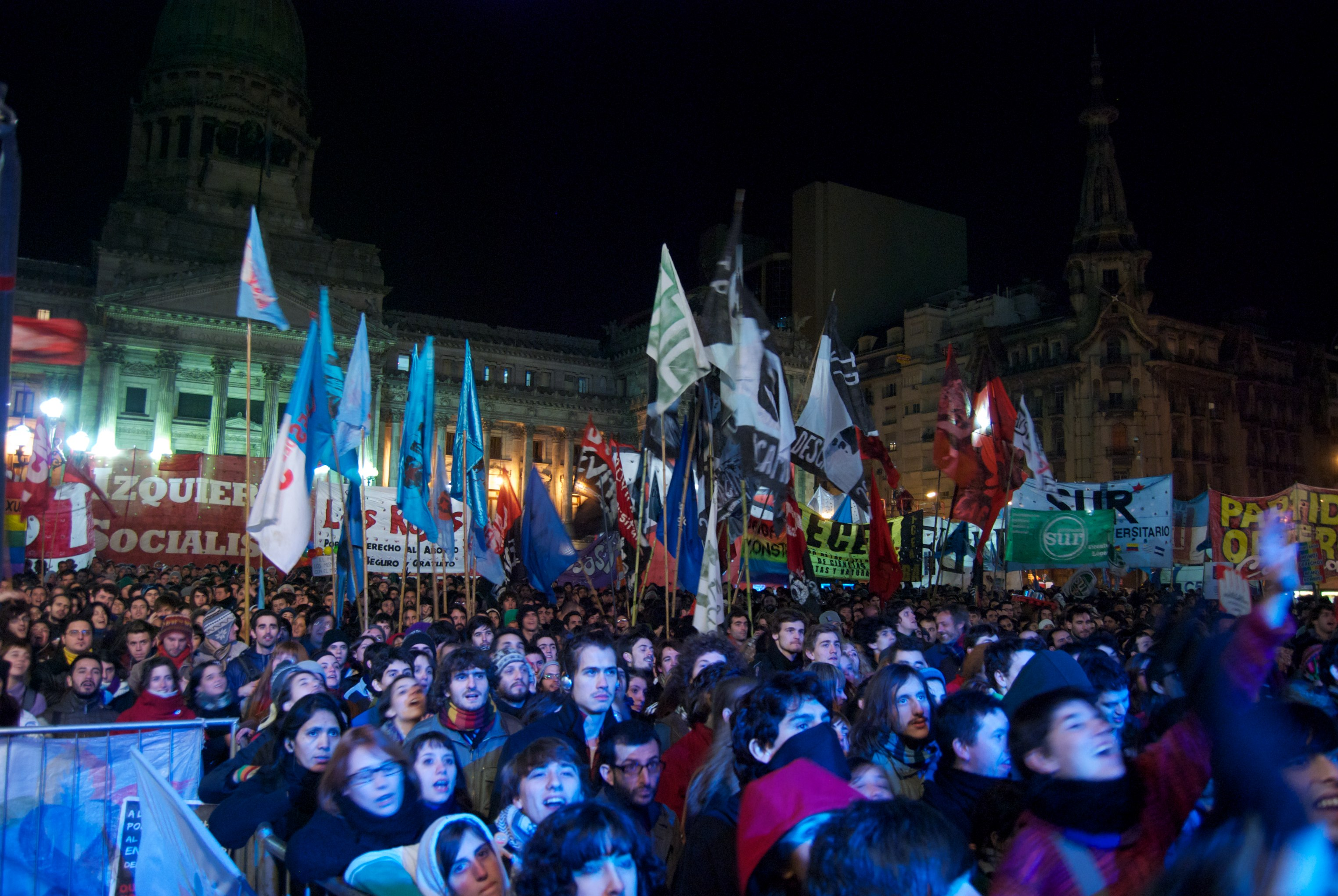
Vigil in support of the law in the early hours of 15 July 2010.

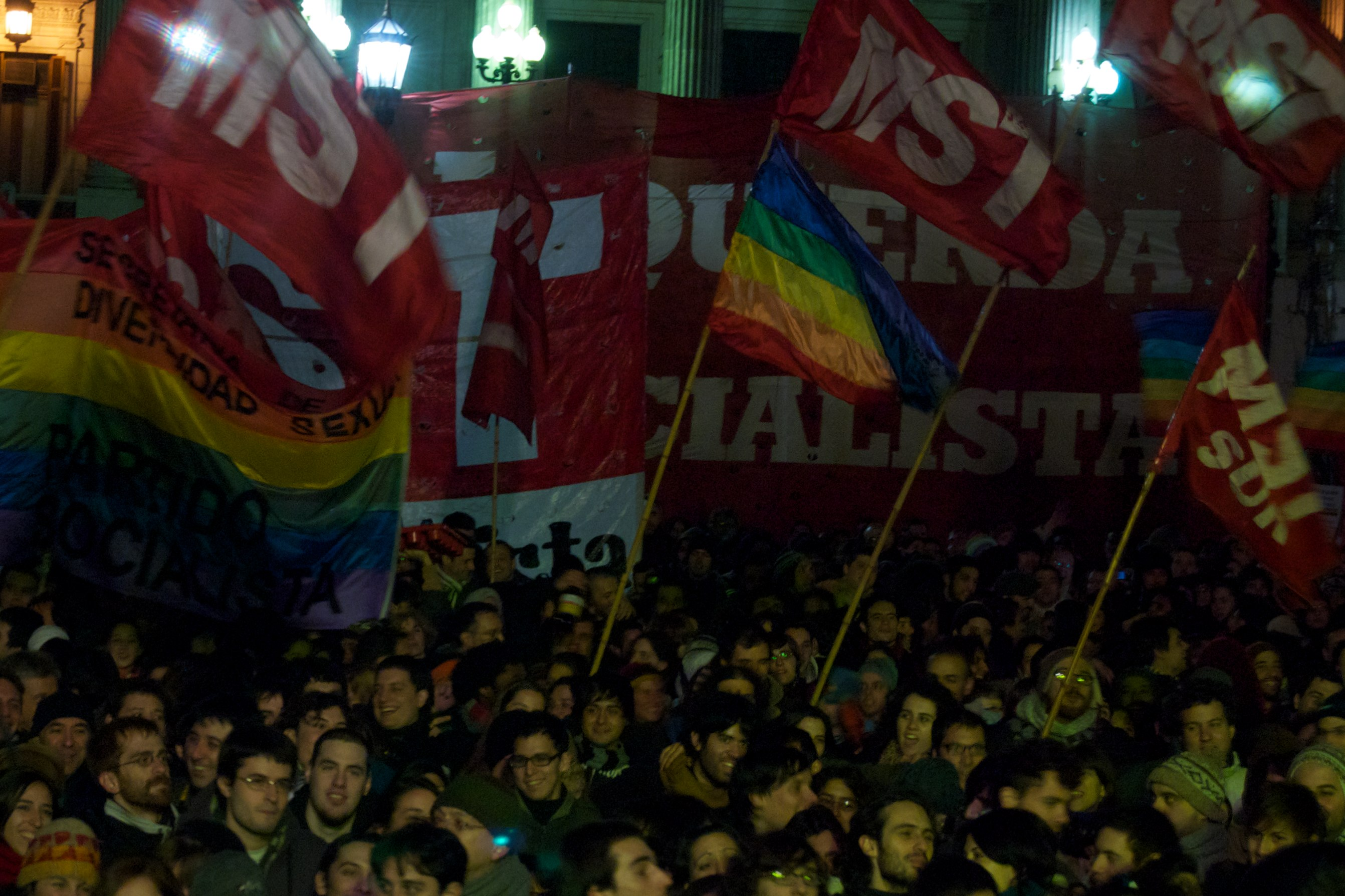
Thousands of activists and supporters gathered outside the National Congress to support the Senate vote.

The approved law is an amendment to several articles of the Civil Code in Book I, Second Section "On rights in family relations", Book II, Third Section, Title II, "On the matrimonial society", and other sections of the Code. The most significant change was to article 172, which had defined marriage as between "a man and a woman". This was replaced with "contracting parties" and the following was added: "Marriage shall have the same requirements and effects, regardless of whether the contracting parties are of the same or different sex."

This also implies adoption, since article 312, which states "No one may be adopted by more than one person simultaneously, unless the adopters are spouses", was not modified. Article 326, concerning the surname of adopted children, includes a clarification for cases involving parents of different or the same sex.

Articles of law 26.413 on birth registration, and 18.248 on personal names and surnames were also amended.

The new law was promulgated by Argentine president Cristina Fernández de Kirchner at a ceremony held at the Casa Rosada, attended by representatives of LGBT organizations.

== Gender identity law ==
Since 2007, the FALGBT and ATTTA have been promoting legislative proposals to guarantee travestis, transsexuals and transgender people the right to identity and the right to comprehensive healthcare. On 8 November 2011, the General Legislation and Justice committees of the National Congress approved the Gender Identity Bill committee report for subsequent debate in the chamber.

On 1 December 2011, the Argentine Chamber of Deputies approved the gender identity bill by 167 votes in favor, 17 against and 7 abstentions.

Finally, with 55 votes in favor and one abstention, the Senate approved the Argentine gender identity law, considered one of the most advanced in the world in terms of freedoms and rights for the LGBT community. The law was promulgated by Executive Decree No. 773/2012 on 24 May 2012 and bears the number 26.743.

=== Amparos for identity ===
Using nearly the same legal strategy with which the FALGBT achieved the passage of the so-called "equal marriage law", several amparo cases were filed before the Administrative and Tax Litigation Courts of the City of Buenos Aires, seeking orders for the modification of the registered sex and name of trans persons. The first such ruling was granted to actress and transsexual vedette Florencia de la V, who received her national identity document with her new identity from Chief of Cabinet Aníbal Fernández and Interior Minister Florencio Randazzo at the Government House.

=== Lawsuit against Javier Milei ===
In January 2025, FALGBT presented an incitement to hatred lawsuit against President Javier Milei following Milei's speech at the World Economic Forum in Davos, where Milei suggested a connection between pedophilia and gay men by making a mention of the case of American rapists William and Zachary Zulock.

== See also ==
- LGBTQ rights in Argentina
  - Homosexuality in Argentina
  - Transgender rights in Argentina
  - Same-sex marriage in Argentina
- INADI
- Buenos Aires Pride
