= Córdoba Pride =

Pride march in Córdoba, Argentina

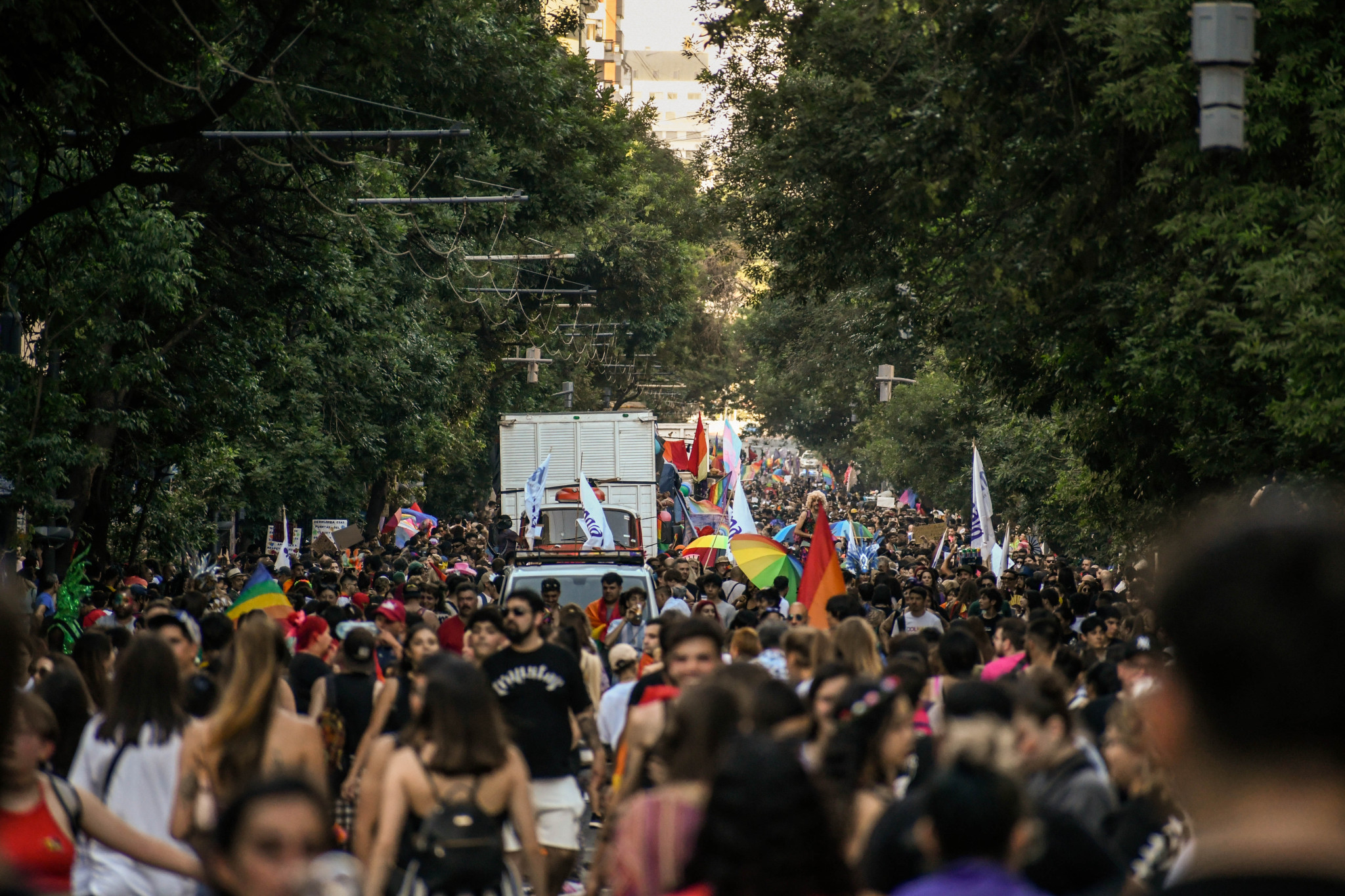
2023 edition of the Córdoba Pride March

The Córdoba Pride is a demonstration held annually in the city of Córdoba, Argentina, with the aim of making sexual and gender diversity visible and celebrated. The event takes place in the month of November since 2009 and gathers thousands of attendees each year, with the 2022 march gathering around 25,000 people.

Unlike in other countries, where pride marches are usually held in June to commemorate International LGBT Pride Day, the Córdoba Pride March is held in November, following the example of the Buenos Aires March, whose organizers chose the month of November in the 1990s to avoid people living with HIV suffering from the cold of June.

The march starts at the intersection of General Paz Avenue and La Tablada Street and goes along General Paz Avenue until it reaches the Patio Olmos shopping mall, then takes Hipólito Yrigoyen Avenue until it ends at the Paseo del Buen Pastor, where a stage is set up for artistic performances.

== History ==
The first conversations to organize a pride march in Córdoba began in 2008 and were led by activists like Martín Apaz. The first edition was held on November 14, 2009, and went from the Las Heras Park to the Intendencia Square, with around 1500 participants. The main demands of this edition were the legalization of same-sex marriage, the approval of a gender identity law and the repeal of the provincial Misdemeanor Code.

The following year a march took place on June 23 with a massive attendance, held to protest and demand justice for the Pepa Gaitán case, a young lesbian woman murdered in March 2010 by her girlfriend's stepfather.

The 2020 edition of the march was canceled due to the Preventive and Mandatory Social Isolation decreed by President Alberto Fernández during the COVID-19 pandemic in Argentina which imposed a COVID-19 lockdown lasting from March 19, 2020, until December 31, 2022, but the event resumed in 2021, and was held along Vélez Sarsfield and Hipólito Yrigoyen avenues, where demands included the enactment of a law to protect sexual characteristics, the production of condoms for "people with vulva", the passage of a surrogacy law, and a reform of the comprehensive sexual education (ESI) to incorporate a perspective of sexual diversity and queer identity, ending with a festival featuring more than 50 artists on stage.

== See also ==
- Buenos Aires Pride
- Rosario Pride
