= María José Lubertino =

Argentine lawyer and politician

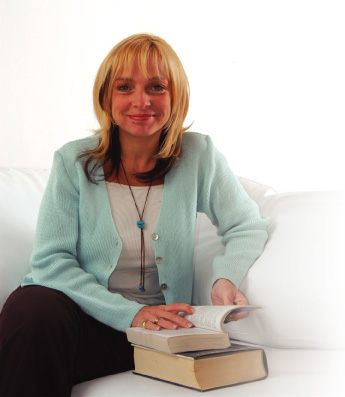

Legislator of the City of Buenos Aires
- In office 10 December 2009 – 10 December 2013

Director of INADI
- In office 13 September 2006 – 10 December 2009
- President: Néstor Kirchner
- Preceded by: Enrique Oteiza
- Succeeded by: Claudio Morgado

National Deputy
- In office June 2003 – 10 December 2003
- Constituency: City of Buenos Aires

Conventional Constituent of the City of Buenos Aires
- In office 19 July 1996 – 1 October 1996

Personal details
- Born: María José Lubertino Beltrán; 13 October 1959 (age 66) Buenos Aires, Argentina
- Party: Radical Civic Union; Espacio Abierto; Front for Victory
- Education: Pontifical Catholic University of Argentina
- Occupation: Lawyer, politician, professor
- Website: lubertino.org.ar

María José Lubertino (born 13 October 1959) is an Argentine lawyer and politician. She has worked in different social movements, as a feminist in the women's movement and human rights organizations, among others. She began her political career in the Radical Civic Union (UCR) from 1982 until the Alliance appointed Lopez Murphy as minister, and from 2003 to the present in Espacio Abierto, that joined the Front for Victory in the 2009 election. Since November 2013, she has been a member of the National Board of the Broad Front.

== Career ==
=== Beginnings ===
María José Lubertino is a lawyer who graduated with honors from the Catholic University of Argentina in 1983. In 1989 she earned a master's degree in Social Sciences with a specialization in Political Science at Latin American Social Sciences Institute (FLACSO). Currently she is a regular professor at the Law School of the University of Buenos Aires (UBA), and occupies the CBC's chairs of Principles of Latin American Law – of which she is a profesora titular – Human Rights, and Elements of Civil Law.

=== UCR activity ===
She began her political activity in 1982, occupying all party positions in the Radical Youth and UCR. She was a consultant in the Chamber of Deputies, in the Senate, in the Ministry of Education, and Youth Director of the City of Buenos Aires during the government of Raúl Alfonsín. In 1996 she was formally elected by the UCR when the City of Buenos Aires elaborated its Constitution, and contributed to 42 projects. As a UCR representative she was vice president of the Editorial Committee and member of the Rights and Guarantees and Special Policies Commissions. She gained public notoriety when she breastfed her newborn son in the session hall.

In addition to being a Constituent of the City of Buenos Aires for the UCR, in the October 1999 elections Lubertino was a candidate for Deputy for Buenos Aires, within the Alliance lists.

I have no doubt that the quality of the leadership of the Alliance can overcome the challenge of combining governance and broad democratic participation.

Lubertino placed fifth in the list of Alliance candidates, but was deferred in favor of Martínez Raymonda. She filed a complaint, and federal electoral judge María Romilda Servini ordered that she be reinstated to her previous position. However, the chamber ruled against her, postponing her membership as a National Deputy.

In the Alliance government she collaborated with Rodolfo Terragno in the Cabinet Office of Ministers, and later was President of the Tripartite Commission of Opportunity Equality and worked with the Ministry of Labor.

In 2002 she participated in the program El candidato de la gente (The People's Candidate) that looked for new political figures.

In 2003 she held a seat in the National Congress as an independent within the socialist bloc, with her bloc boss being Jorge Rivas. As National Deputy she presented more than 45 bills in six months.

=== INADI management ===
In September 2006, during the presidency of Néstor Kirchner, Lubertino assumed the presidency of the National Institute Against Discrimination, Xenophobia and Racism (INADI), a decentralized organization of the national state, whose objective is to guarantee respect for the rights of people who may be affected by any type of discrimination, whether because of their ethnic origin, nationality, political opinions, religious beliefs, gender or sexual identity, disability or illness, age, or physical appearance. She held this post until 10 December 2009 when she became a Legislator of the City of Buenos Aires. INADI is a decentralized organization that until then had a practically testimonial function, with a minimal structure in relation to the large volume of tasks to be addressed. The Lubertino administration was characterized by making visible the issue of discrimination in Argentine society in its full dimensions, through growth of the institute's services and active interaction with the media.

From 2006 to 2009, INADI opened its own branches in 21 provinces and in the Autonomous City of Buenos Aires, as part of a federalization plan which included agreements with more than 200 municipalities throughout the country.

In 2006, a 24-hour telephone line was created for free consultations. During Lubertino's administration it had a 50% increase in calls, reaching more than 500 per month. Likewise, the consultations received at INADI's Free Legal Guard increased almost 100% in that period. In summary, the total number of complaints and actions for discrimination increased almost fivefold during Lubertino's term, from 440 the year before to 1,911 in the last year of her administration. Opinions and technical reports for discrimination issues went from 78 to 286 per year.

A fundamental objective was the articulation of channels for participation in civil society and corporate social responsibility. To this end, the Civil Society Forums were created for each thematic axis and in each province, as areas of training in anti-discrimination policies and co-management with civil society organizations and citizens. The forums are grouped around the following axes: older adults, Afro-descendants, persons with disabilities, ideological diversity, sexual diversity, religious diversity, gender, youth, migrants and refugees, girls and boys, indigenous peoples, people in confinement and released, former conscript soldiers of the Falklands War, people living with HIV/AIDS, non-discrimination in sports, people living in poverty, environmental discrimination, health, education, media, discrimination against drug users, and drug users and their families.

Also, taking art as one of the dimensions on which to work in the fight against discrimination, the Art against Discrimination Program was created during the Lubertino administration to open a space for citizen participation that contributes, through artistic expression, to a society that celebrates diversity. In 2007 the program focused on the plastic arts, in 2008 on the theater, and in 2009 on fashion.

Another initiative was the creation of the Network of Companies for Diversity, aimed at companies and civil society organizations with the aim of promoting conditions that promote diversity, good corporate citizenship, and a culture of social responsibility, focusing on the eradication of discrimination. The Network addresses discrimination on the basis of gender, disability, racial or ethnic origin, nationality, religious beliefs, sexual identity, age, physical appearance, social status, and any other personal situation or characteristic.

In the same vein, INADI, with the support of the World Bank, began implementation of the Pilot Program for the Certification of Companies in Gender Equity (MEGA 2009). Participating companies accept the responsibility of adopting the Gender Equality Model as a Management System, which promotes gender equity in the field of business, seeking to detect existing inequalities and establish strategic measures to correct them.

In late 2006, INADI created the Award for Good Anti-Discrimination Practices, to distinguish people and institutions from different disciplines that stood out during each year in the development of actions against discrimination.

Although INADI established a network of researchers throughout the country, comprising more than 600 experts, the need to systematize surveys on some topics led to the formation of three permanent specific observatories:

- The Observatory of Discrimination in Radio and Television is a space for inter-institutional cooperation formed by the Federal Broadcasting Committee (COMFER), INADI, and the National Council for Women (CNM). This Observatory began its meetings in 2006. In conjunction with COMFER and CNM, a follow-up and analysis is carried out on the format and content of state, private, and community radio and television broadcasts that include any discrimination, prejudice, mockery, aggression, or stigmatization of different groups or sectors of the population. In this way, a series of reports were made on programs and advertisements that carry discriminatory messages, and dialogue has been held with those responsible for these expressions.
- The Observatory of the Discrimination in Football was created in August 2007 as a space of interinstitutional cooperation formed by the Argentine Football Association (AFA), referees' associations, journalists from print media, radio, and television, and personalities from the academic field. The Observatory is responsible for carrying out the necessary steps before any complaint of discrimination in football. It also carries out awareness talks with players, referees, and leaders of the different Argentine football leagues and gives monthly training courses for sports journalism students.
- The Observatory on Discrimination in Public Opinion of Civil Society was created in July 2009. It seeks to deepen the studies carried out by the National Map of Discrimination using its same quantitative methodology, but refining and regularizing the collection of data through the "Barometer of Discrimination". The purpose of the Barometer is to study the evolution of discrimination over the years and to understand civil society's vision of practices and related perceptions.

After leaving INADI, Lubertino was critical of some of her successors. She warned that "the body has ceased to have a public presence and is cutting back and retreating," referring to an order by INADI president Javier Buján to close offices of that organization in the interior of the country.

== Later work ==
Lubertino was founder and president of the Young Women's Association, the Women's Social and Political Institute, and the Citizen Association for Human Rights. She has joined the campaign for the right to legal, safe, and free abortion.

She created Espacio Abierto (Open Space), an organization identified with the democratic left, focusing on human rights, environmental sustainability, equitable distribution of wealth, and social integration and inclusion. It joined the Popular Gathering for Victory in the 2009 Buenos Aires elections.

In 2011 she supported the lists of the Front for Victory. She is a member of the Unidos y organizados Committee of the City of Buenos Aires.

Espacio Abierto joined the Broad Front in 2012, and Lubertino has been on its National Board since November 2013.

She is also honorary president of the Citizen Association for Human Rights, an entity that works actively for the environment, parity between women and men, and against all types of discrimination and violence.

In the 2013 elections for the Buenos Aires City Legislature, Lubertino – who ended her term as legislator in December – was ranked 15th on the Front for Victory list, and did not renew her seat.

In 2014, María José Lubertino was appointed head of the Observatory on the Rights of Persons with Disabilities, an organization created in 2011 under the Office of the President's Social Policy Council, to monitor and promote compliance with the United Nations Convention on the Rights of Persons with Disabilities. She presented a bill to institutionalize the Observatory, guarantee the labor quota for this population sector, and make registered work compatible with the retirement or non-contributory pension.

Lubertino filed a criminal complaint against the city's Culture Minister Hernán Lombardi in 2013 for having authorized the repurposing of the Bar Notable Richmond, where a local sportswear store began operating. According to the complaint "Lombardi ignored a judicial protection with final judgment that placed the fate of a notable bar under his responsibility, and passed over the existing laws of protection of historical heritage." Subsequently, Lubertino filed a criminal complaint against Mauricio Macri for repression at Hospital Borda and the demolition of its Protected Workshop 19. This also involved the Buenos Aires ministers of Security, Urban Development, and Health.

In 2016, as a result of a tragedy at the Time Warp Festival in Costa Salguero, where five young people died due to drug use, she recounted the irregular situation of the area and denounced the complicity of PRO officials from the City and the Province. She singled out the 1st Vice President of the Buenos Aires Legislature and her husband, among others. "It would be impossible for these situations to happen if there was not a system of protection from these issues for friends' businesses," she complained.

== Pro-choice activism ==
On 8 May 2018, María José Lubertino attended the eighth day of debate for the legalization of abortion in Argentina in the 8th plenary session of National Congress commissions. She represented a network of Latin American eco-feminist legislators who "defend life, including non-human life, and are in favor of the legalization of abortion," stating her pro-choice position, taking a list of recommendations from the monitoring committees of human rights treaties, which she submitted to the legislators.
