= Rosario Pride =

LGBTQ event in Rosario, Argentina

Rosario Pride Marcha del Orgullo de Rosario
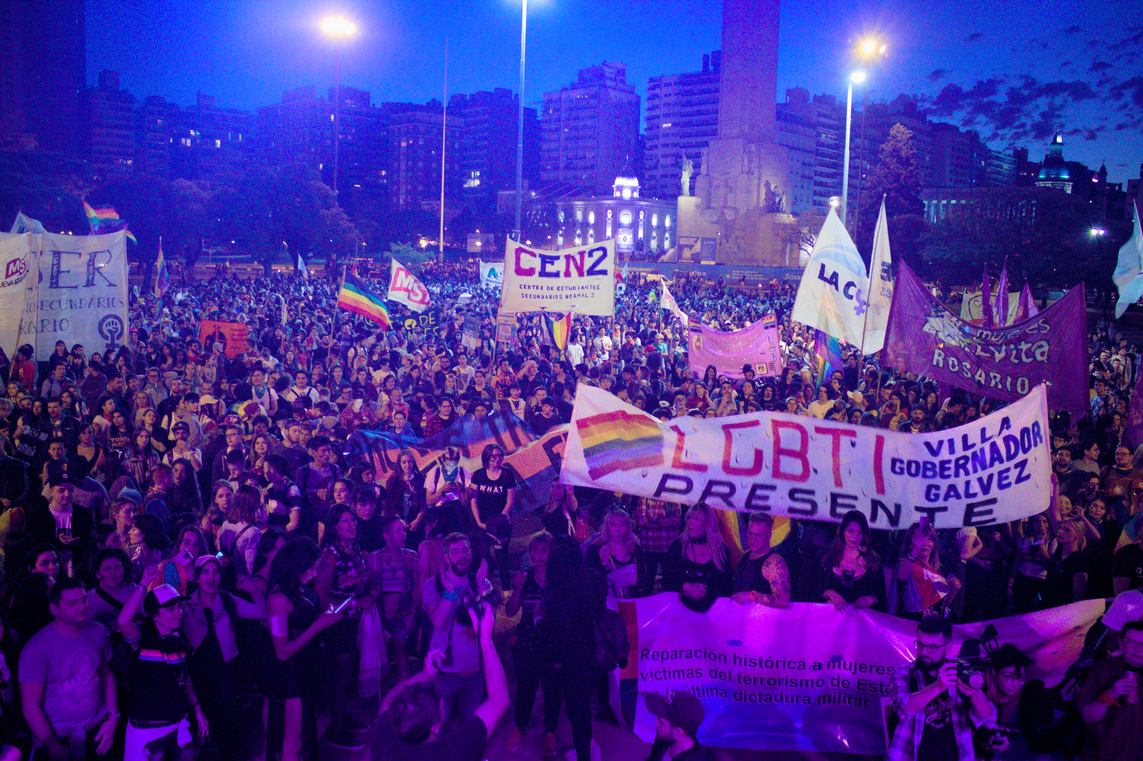
- Status: reocurring
- Genre: parade, protests
- Begins: 2008
- Frequency: annually
- Country: Argentina
- Website: https://orgullorosario.org/

The Rosario Pride March is a yearly demonstration that takes place the city of Rosario, Argentina in support of the LGBTQ+ community. The event has been held since 2008.

Unlike many countries which hold pride marches in June, the Rosario Pride March is held in October.

The march begins with a concentration in Plaza Libertad, a historic part of the city and a former red-light district and extends to the National Flag Memorial.

The celebrations are run by the Rosario Pride Coordinator, which unites over 40 LGBT+ organisations in the city and region, as well as coordinating work for the promotion and defense of the rights of sexual and gender minorities.

== History ==
The first march was held in 1996, four years after the first Pride march in Buenos Aires, Argentina, during the first "National Encounter for Gay, Lesbian, Transvestite, Transexual, and Transgender people" held in the city between the 5th and 7th of April at the Roberto Fontanarrosa Cultural Center and brought together LGBT+ activists from all over Argentina. Notable activists included Lohana Berkins, Carlos Jauregui, Rafael Freda, Alejandra Sardá, Karla Ojeda, Pedro Paradiso, Guillermo Lovagnini, María Rachid, Marcelo Ferreyra, Nadia Echazú, and María Belén Correa.

Rosario is known as "the cradle of the (Argentinian) flag" due to it being first raised on the banks of the Paraná river in 1812 by its creator, General Manuel Belgrano, so this encounter had as its slogan "On the banks of the Paraná, a new flag is born".

=== During COVID-19 ===
In 2020, due to lockdowns, the celebrations were moved online and instead they celebrated Pride Week virtually from the 1st to the 10th of December.

Since then, Pride Week continues to take place prior to the Pride March.

We know that it is a festive march, where there is color, brightness and fun, but we also want to underline its political character.

— Michelle Vargas Lobo

It returned to the streets in 2023 with over 70k people.

== See also ==
- Córdoba Pride
- March of Pride (Buenos Aires)
