= María Rachid =

Argentine politician (born 1974)

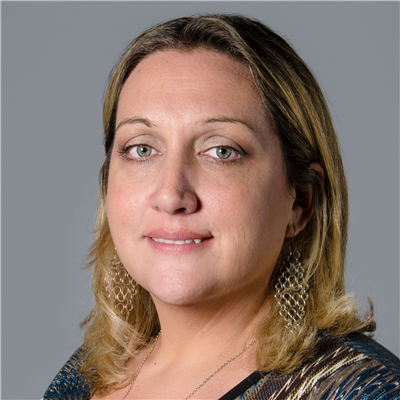

Legislator of the City of Buenos Aires
- In office 10 December 2011 – 9 December 2015

Personal details
- Born: 8 November 1974 (age 51) Mercedes, Buenos Aires Province, Argentina
- Party: Evita Movement (2012–present)
- Other political affiliations: Front for Victory (2003–2017); Frente de Todos (2019–present)

María Rachid (born 8 November 1974) is a politician, social leader of the human rights area and the collective LGBT community in Argentina. She served as vice-president of the National Institute Against Discrimination, Xenophobia and Racism from December 2010, until 10 June 2011 when she was elected into the Buenos Aires City Legislature in the elections on 10 July 2011, and took office on 10 December.

== Biography ==
She studied law at Universidad de Belgrano, Western Connecticut State University in the United States and Kennedy University, but did not graduate.

In 1996 she founded La Fulana (Community Space for Women who Love Women), where she coordinated workshops for study and reflection on discrimination, self-esteem, homophobia, family and other health issues such as HIV/AIDS, violence, motherhood, STIs, cancer, etc.

She was Coordinator of the Health, Press and Communication and Administration and Finance Areas of the Community Center. She designed rights and health campaigns for lesbians and bisexual women and participated in the elaboration of public policies and anti-discrimination bills that were presented to the most diverse administrative and legislative authorities.

In 2006 she was one of the founders of the Federación Argentina de Lesbianas, Gays, Bisexuales y Trans (FALGBT), which brings together many sexual diversity organizations that campaign for the recognition of equal rights for LGBT people in Argentina.

== Ley de matrimonio igualitario ==
On 14 February 2007, she filed with Claudia Castro the first judicial appeal to declare unconstitutional two articles of the civil code that prevented same-sex marriage.

As president of the LGBT Federation, she spearheaded the "same rights, same names" campaign, which led to the passage of the "Equal Marriage Act" (which allows same-sex marriage) in 2010. Due to her constant militancy and her strong media presence throughout this process, Rachid became one of the leading figures in the broad movement that took part in the campaign for the sanction of this law.

In mid-2010 she founded the National Roundtable for Equality and Against Discrimination, which brings together representatives of various groups that have historically been discriminated against in Argentina, such as people of African descent, people with disabilities, the migrant community, indigenous peoples, and people living with HIV and AIDS.

On 22 December 2010, Rachid was appointed by the President of Argentina, Cristina Fernández de Kirchner as Vice President of the National Institute against Discrimination, Xenophobia and Racism, where she had already served as coordinator of the National Sexual Diversity Program and as Coordinator of the Human Resources area. She resigned in June 2011 due to disagreements with journalist Claudio Morgado.

María Rachid was elected legislator of the city of Buenos Aires by the Front for Victory on 10 July 2011, one month after her resignation from the vice-presidency of INADI.

== Legislative activity ==
As a legislator, she presented a large number of projects to the Legislature of the City of Buenos Aires, including a bill against institutional violence by the security forces, another project for the transfer and assignment of powers to investigate and judge crimes and contraventions committed in the Autonomous City of Buenos Aires, and a project for the regulation of assisted reproduction techniques, among others. In April 2015, the anti-discrimination bill for the city was approved, and was promoted together with Deputy Daniel Lipovetzky.
