= Esteban Paulón =

Argentine lawyer and politician

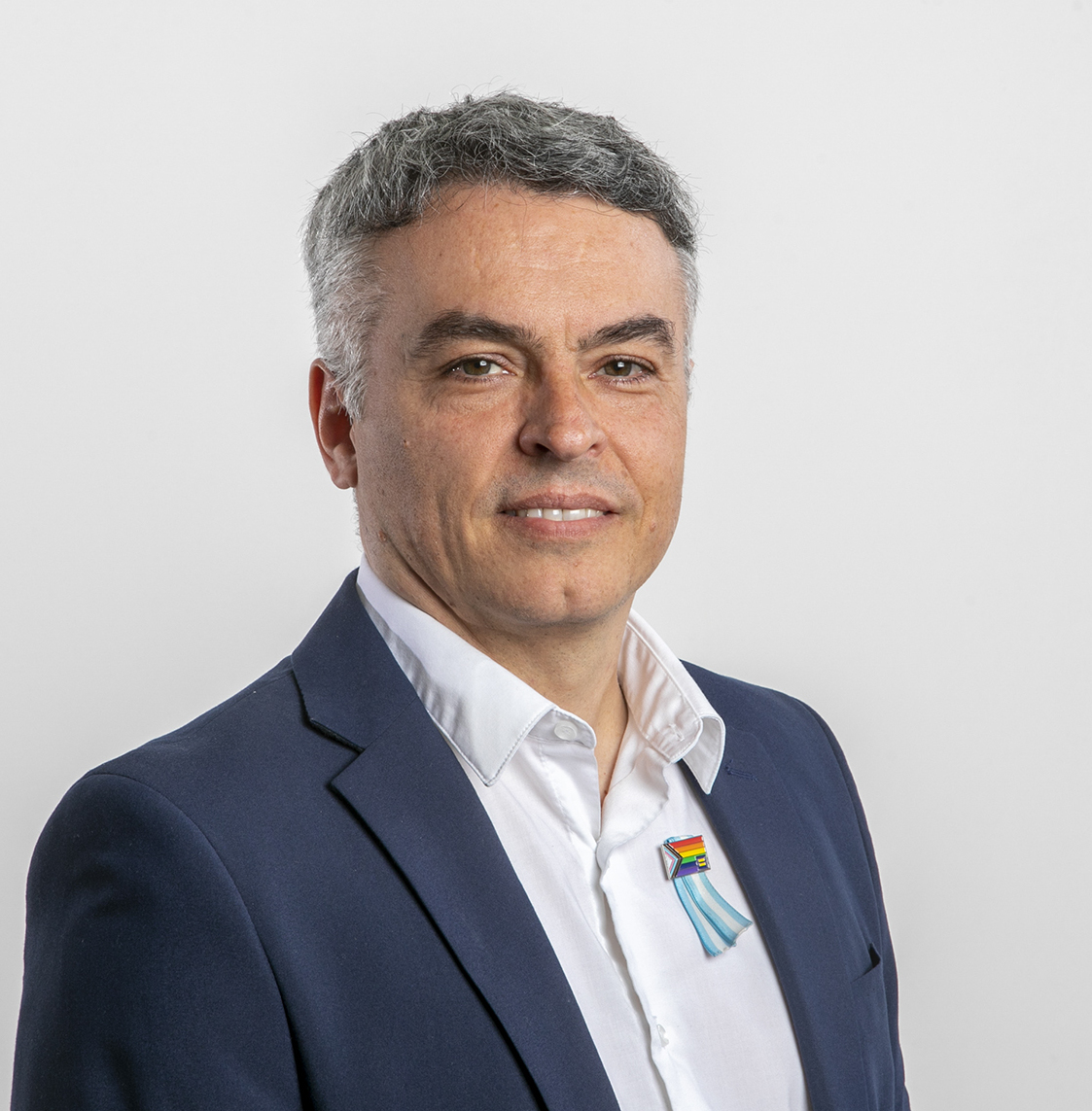

National Deputy
- Incumbent
- Assumed office 10 December 2023
- Constituency: Santa Fe

Personal details
- Born: 17 June 1978 (age 48)
- Party: Socialist Party (since 2002); Popular Socialist Party (1992–2002)
- Other political affiliations: Hacemos por Nuestro País (since 2023)
- Education: Universidad del Salvador

Esteban Paulón (born 17 June 1978) is an Argentine LGBT rights activist and politician currently serving as a National Deputy elected in Santa Fe Province. From 2010 to 2015 he was president of the FALGBT, Argentina's largest LGBT rights organization.

== Early life and career ==
Paulón was born on 17 June 1978. He completed a licenciatura degree on tourism at the Universidad del Salvador (USAL).

His activism in favour of LGBT rights in Argentina led to him leading the Federación Argentina de Lesbianas, Gays, Bisexuales y Trans (English: "Argentine Federation of Lesbians, Gays, Bisexuals and Trans"; FALGBT+), serving as its president from 2010 to 2015, vice president from 2015 to 2019, and secretary general from 2007 to 2019. He had an active participation in drafting and promoting the Equal Marriage Law (2009), which legalised same-sex marriage in Argentina and the Gender Identity Law (2012), which granted the travesti and trans population free access to legal gender changes, hormone replacement therapy and gender-affirming surgery.

In 2015, he led a team that compiled the Orgullo en el trabajo report (English: Pride at Work) for the International Labour Organization and the LGBT Citizenship Plan “De la Igualdad legal a la igualdad real” (English: "From legal equality to real equality"), in collaboration with the FALGBT and the United Nations inter-agency system in Argentina.

From 2015 to 2019, he was Undersecretary of Sexual Diversity Policies of Santa Fe Province under Governor Miguel Lifschitz. He also chaired the executive committee of Red Gay Latino and served as an ad honorem advisor to the Ministry of Women, Genders and Diversity of Argentina from 2019 to 2023.

== National Deputy ==
At the 2023 general election, Paulón was the first candidate in the Hacemos por Nuestro País list to the Argentine Chamber of Deputies in Santa Fe (under the name "La Fuerza de Santa Fe"); the list received 9.19% of the vote, enough for Paulón to make it past the D'Hondt cut and be elected. Upon taking office he joined the Federal Encounter legislative bloc, alongside fellow socialist deputy Mónica Fein.

A long-time LGBTQ+ activist who played a central role in the approval of marriage equality and gender identity laws, Paulón quickly brought this agenda into Congress by introducing bills on equal parental leave, comprehensive rights for trans people, prevention of discrimination, and legalization of cannabis. He has also advanced environmental initiatives such as a wetlands protection law, while consistently defending science, public institutions, and federal funding.

Paulón has positioned himself as a critic of President Javier Milei's administration, particularly regarding austerity measures, privatizations, and limits on social rights. He has cosigned proposals to protect the science and technology system and to secure public funding for national universities. He has also expressed opposition to decrees that weakened public agencies like the INTI.

Ahead of the 2025 legislative election, Paulón launched his candidacy to run for a seat in the National Senate for the City of Buenos Aires, despite having been elected to the Chamber of Deputies for Santa Fe in 2023.

== Electoral history ==
Electoral history of Esteban Paulón
Election	Office	List	#	District	Votes			Result	Ref.
Election	Office	List	#	District	Total	%	P.	Result	Ref.
2023	National Deputy	La Fuerza de Santa Fe	1	Santa Fe Province	184,680	9.19%	4th (Note: Presented on an electoral list. The data shown represents the share of the vote the entire party/alliance received in that constituency.)	Elected	
