= March of Pride (Buenos Aires) =

Annual LGBT Pride parade in Buenos Aires, Argentina

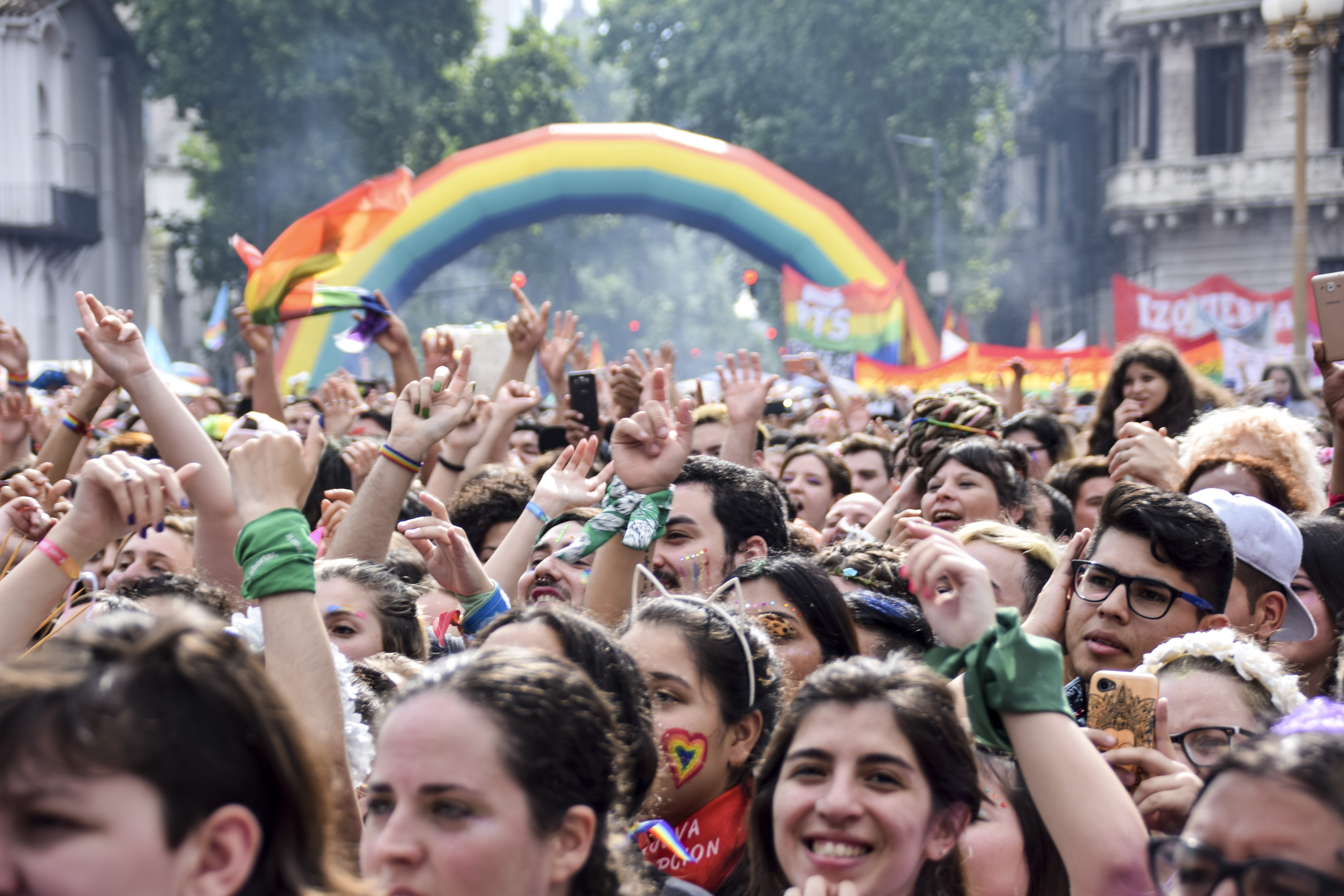
View of the 27th March of Pride on 17 November 2018

The March of Pride (Spanish: Marcha del Orgullo) is an annual pride parade in Buenos Aires, Argentina. The march promotes the equality and rights of LGBT people. It takes place in November in memory of the creation of the first Argentine and Latin American LGBT organization, Nuestro Mundo, in November 1967.

The first March of Pride in Buenos Aires was held in 1992. Most subsequent marches have been held annually on the first Saturday of November.

== History ==
In November 1967, Nuestro Mundo was founded, making it the first LGBT organization in Argentina and Latin America.

On 28 June 1969, a gay bar in Greenwich Village, New York, called the Stonewall Inn was raided by the police. Officers made 13 arrests before being confronted by bystanders and community members; this confrontation led to the Stonewall riots.

On 28 June 1970 (exactly one year later), approximately five thousand people gathered on Christopher Street outside the Stonewall Inn in commemoration of the riots and marched up Sixth Avenue to Central Park. This event is widely considered the first Pride March in history.

The first March of Pride in Buenos Aires occurred on 28 June 1992. Participants gathered in front of the Buenos Aires Metropolitan Cathedral and marched to the National Congress of Argentina. The march was made up of about 250 people, many of whom wore masks to avoid being recognized. The group of marchers included members of the Radical Civic Union and the Mothers of the Plaza de Mayo.

== Marches of Pride ==
- In 2004, more than 7,000 people participated in the March of Pride. For the first time, a "Pride Fair" was held in the Plaza de Mayo during the event.
- In 2007, approximately 25,000 people marched from the Plaza de Mayo to the National Congress. The closing ceremony was conducted by Argentine radio host and writer Daisy May Queen.
- In 2008, approximately 50,000 people participated in the march. The theme was Voten nuestras leyes ("Vote for our laws"), in reference to the proposed legislation to protect same-sex marriage and gender identity which had become stagnant in the National Congress, as well as the prospect of overturning the laws which criminalized homosexuality in 10 provinces of Argentina. Toward the end of the event, members of the crowd were heard booing the Vatican (which had recently spoken out against sexual diversity) and Mauricio Macri (the Mayor of Buenos Aires at the time).
- On 6 November 2010, the March of Pride celebrated the legalization of same-sex marriage in Argentina. An estimated 100,000 people participated. Marchers and organizers also advocated for the passage of the Gender Identity Law.
- On 5 November 2011, the March of Pride once again advocated for the passage of the Gender Identity Law. The theme of the march was Ley de Identidad de Género ya ("Gender Identity Law Now"). Approximately 250,000 people participated.
- On 10 November 2012, the theme of the March of Pride was Educación en la Diversidad para crecer en Igualdad ("Education in Diversity to grow in Equality").
- On November 9, 2013, the theme of the March of Pride was Educación sexual, igualitaria, libre y laica ("Equal, free and secular sexual education").
- On 15 November 2014, the theme of the March of Pride was Por mas igualdad real: ley anti discriminatoria y estado laico ("For more real equality: Anti-Discrimination Law and the Secular State").
- On 7 November 2015, the theme of the March of Pride was Ley anti discriminatoria ya ("Anti-discrimination law now").
- On 26 November 2016, organizers repeated the theme from the previous year: Ley anti discriminatoria ya ("Anti-discrimination law now").
- On 18 November 2017, the theme of the March of Pride was Basta de femicidios a travestis, transexuales y transgeneros. Basta de violencia institucional. Orgullo para defender los derechos conquistados. ("Enough of the femicide of transvestites, transsexuals and transgenders. Enough of the institutional violence. Pride for defending our conquered rights.")
- On 17 November 2018, the theme of the March of Pride was Basta de genocidio trans/travesti. No al ajuste, la violencia y la discriminación. Macri y la Iglesia son anti-derechos. ("Enough of trans/transvestite genocide. No to austerity, violence and discrimination. Macri and the Church are anti-rights.")
- On 2 November 2019, the theme of the March of Pride was Por un país sin violencia institucional ni religiosa. Basta de crímenes de odio. ("For a country without institutional or religious violence. Enough of the hate crimes.")
- In 2020, in-person events for the March of Pride were canceled due to the COVID-19 pandemic. Alternate events were hosted online.
- On 6 November 2021, the theme of the march was Ley Integral Trans ¡Ya!. ("Comprehensive trans law, now!")
- On 5 November 2022, the theme of the march was La Deuda es con Nosotres. Ley Integral Trans. Ley Antidiscriminatoria. Sí al Lenguaje Inclusivo. ("The debt is with us. Comprehensive trans law. Anti-discriminatory law. Yes to inclusive language"), referring to Argentina's debt with the International Monetary Fund.
- On 4 November 2023, the theme of the march was Ni un ajuste más, ni un derecho menos ¡Ley Antidiscriminatoria, Ley Integral Trans Ya! ¡Frenemos a les Antiderechos!. ("Not a single budget cut more, not a single right less. Anti-discriminatory law, comprehensive trans law now! Let's stop anti-rights!") Due to the rise of Javier Milei (major right wing politician) on voting polls.
- On 3 November 2024, the theme of the March of Pride was No hay libertad sin derechos ni políticas públicas. No hay libertad con ajuste y represión. ("There is no freedom without rights and public policies. There is no freedom with budget cuts and repression.") The use of the concept of "freedom" alluded to Javier Milei's party, La Libertad Avanza.

== See also ==
- Córdoba Pride
- Rosario Pride
