= Unidos y Organizados =

Argentine political coalition

Unidos y Organizados (Spanish: United and organized) was an Argentine political coalition, composed by minor organizations that supported the presidency of Cristina Fernández de Kirchner. It includes La Cámpora, the Evita Movement (Movimiento Evita), the Humanist Party, the Communist Party, the Peronist Youth (Juventud Peronista), Nuevo Encuentro, Frente Transversal, M.I.L.E.S. and Corriente de Liberación Nacional (KOLINA). The name was taken from a speech of Cristina Fernández at José Amalfitani Stadium on April 27, 2012.

== Bibliography ==
- Mendelevich, Pablo (2013). El Relato Kirchnerista en 200 expresiones [The Kirchnerite speech in 200 words] (in Spanish). Argentina: Ediciones B. ISBN 978-987-627-412-8.
