= Paseo del Buen Pastor =

Structure in Córdoba, Argentina

Coordinates: 31°25′26″S 64°11′11″W

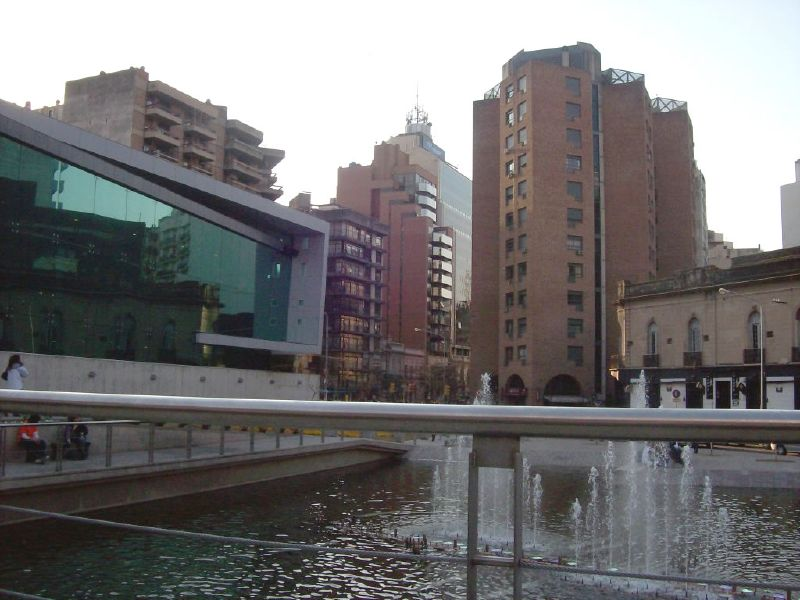
Paseo del Buen Pastor

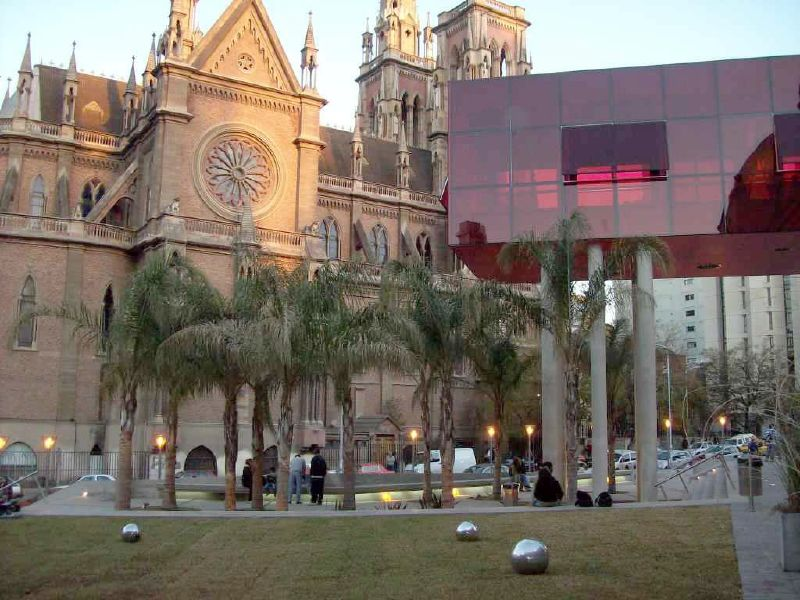
View of the Church of the Sacred Heart

Paseo del Buen Pastor is a cultural, recreational and commercial center in Córdoba, Argentina.

== Overview ==
A charitable project organized by the city and the Sisters of Our Lady of Charity of the Good Shepherd of Angers, the establishment of a women's jail, was completed by architect José Montblanch in 1906. The drab structure was overshadowed, however, by architect Augusto Ferrari's Church of the Sacred Heart, a Gothic Revival landmark built between 1926 and 1934.

The lowly building, set amid the growing, upscale residential and commercial area of Nueva Córdoba, was notable only for its chapel - the only one in Córdoba built in a Greek architectural style. It was decorated with frescoes painted by local artists Emilio Caraffa, Manuel Cardeñosa and Emiliano Gómez Clara.

The jail itself became severely inadequate by 1970, and the facility was closed, shortly afterwards; its last recorded inmates were three women detained for political reasons during the early years of the last dictatorship, around 1977 (the detainees were freed, and no human rights abuses were recorded at the site). Following years of scuttled projects, the Province of Córdoba announced the approval of the 10,000 m^{2} (107,000 ft^{2}) site's development in August 2002.

Overseen by Agencia Córdoba Cultura (a provincial bureau), and architect Marina Waisman, the development cost US$5 million and began with the demolition of the former jail, in early 2005. The chapel, however, was restored and converted into an arts center. A 6,400 m^{2} (68,000 ft^{2}) shopping gallery was developed over the ruins, including two restaurants, two bars, and storefronts reserved for wine, leather and handicrafts retailers. The "Good Pastor's Promenade" was inaugurated on August 4, 2007.
