= National Institute Against Discrimination, Xenophobia and Racism =

Former government agency in Argentina

National Institute Against Discrimination, Xenophobia and Racism (INADI)
- Instituto Nacional contra la Discriminacón, Xenofobia y Racismo
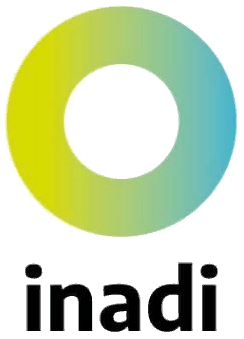

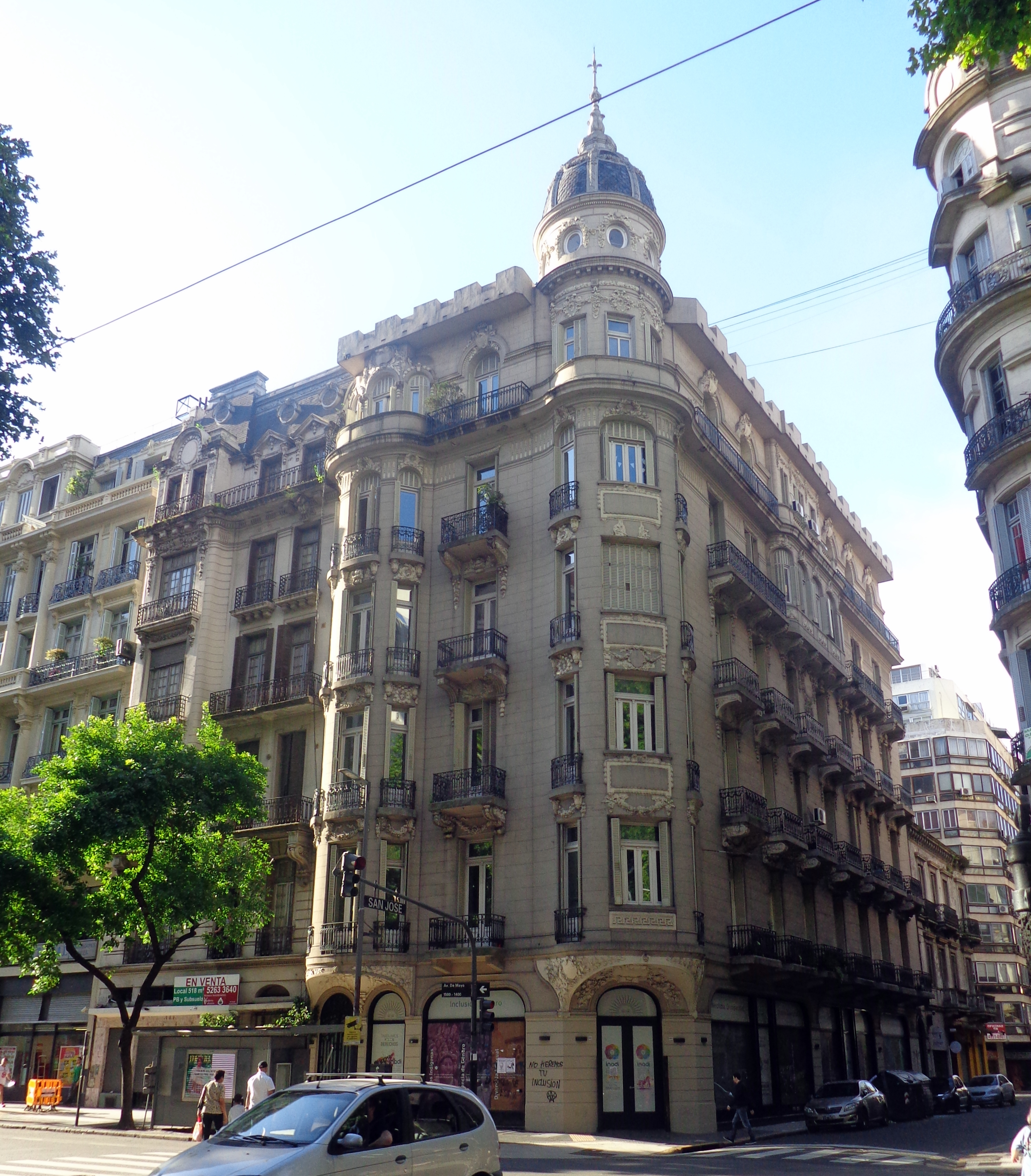
- INADI headquarters in Buenos Aires

Agency overview
- Formed: 5 July 1995
- Dissolved: 6 August 2024
- Jurisdiction: Government of Argentina
- Headquarters: Buenos Aires
- Employees: 355 (2024)
- Agency executive: Greta Pena, Interventor
- Parent department: Ministry of Justice
- Website: argentina.gob.ar/inadi

The National Institute Against Discrimination, Xenophobia and Racism (Spanish: Instituto Nacional contra la Discriminación, la Xenofobia y el Racismo, mostly known for its acronym INADI) was a state agency of the Government of Argentina (answerable to the Ministry of Justice and Human Rights) which is charged with receiving complaints and pursuing charges against citizens accused of acts of discrimination or hatred. Created in July 1995 by Federal Law 24515, INADI is considered one of Argentina's National human rights institutions. On 22 February 2024, the government of Javier Milei announced that it would close INADI permanently.

In February 2024, the Government of Argentina led by Javier Milei announced the INADI would be definitely closed, as part of the state restructuring carried out by the national administration. The government also revealed that several irregular procedures were found at INADI. The agency would be taken over by the Ministry of Justice.

The agency was officially dissolved in August 2024 by decree n° 696/24, which also stated all the agency's resources and assets were transferred to the Ministry of Justice.

== Purpose ==
The National Institute against Discrimination, Xenophobia and Racism of Argentina was an agency whose main goal is to combat all forms of discrimination, xenophobia, and racism within Argentina nationally and institute new protections, as well as consoling individual concerned citizens and working on education projects.

== Structure ==
INADI was led by a board of directors, chaired by a director. The chair and vice-chair were appointed to their positions for four-year terms by the Cabinet from a list of three candidates selected by the Congress; four of the directors were representatives of Ministries of the Interior, Foreign Affairs, International Trade and Worship, Justice and Human Rights and Education.

The other three directors were representatives of NGOs who have extensive experience in the struggle for human rights. The Advisory Council, which assisted the board of directors, had ten members representing NGOs and reflects the diversity of the groups most affected by discrimination.

== Recent activities ==
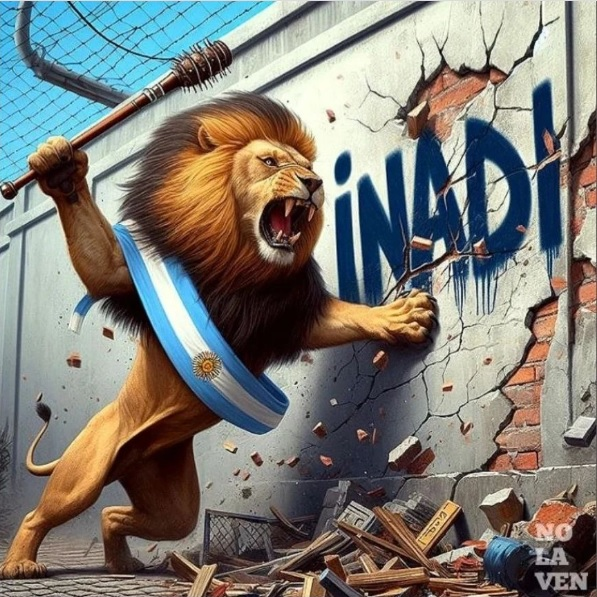
AI-generated image posted by president Javier Milei on Instagram to announce the closure of the INADI.

In partnership with civil society and other civil rights organizations in Argentina, the national Institute against racism and xenophobia worked towards resisting the oppressions of marginalized groups in Argentina including, but not limited to, indigenous peoples, immigrants, Afro-Argentines, mestizo Argentines, Jews and Arabs. The national institute of discrimination, racism, and xenophobia receives grievances from individual peoples or more generally the organization puts most of their efforts forward through education campaigns including audio-visual materials, brochures, and pamphlets.

Since the resignation of former director Victoria Donda in December 2022, the INADI was overseen by a federal interventor, presently Greta Pena.

On February 22, 2024, presidential spokesperson Manuel Adorni announced the government's intention to dissolve the organization.

President Javier Milei celebrated the announcement on his social media. In 2022, Milei had criticized the actions of the organization during the FIFA World Cup in Qatar. Javier Milei himself, along with ruling party legislator Ramiro Marra, had been reported to the organization for discriminatory expressions. Although the presidential spokesperson explained that the closure would not be immediate due to bureaucratic reasons, some deputies stated that the executive branch does not have the authority to eliminate an organization created by a law of the National Congress.

The announcement prompted statements of rejection from the Delegation of Israeli Argentine Associations (DAIA), Amnesty International, and the Huésped Foundation, among other organizations and leaders.

Subsequently, Minister of Justice Mariano Cúneo Libarona clarified that the functions would be absorbed by the Ministry, which was later confirmed by INADI on the social media platform X. The agency was officially dissolved in August 2024.
