= Córdoba, Argentina =

City in Argentina

Cordoba
- City
- Ciudad de Córdoba
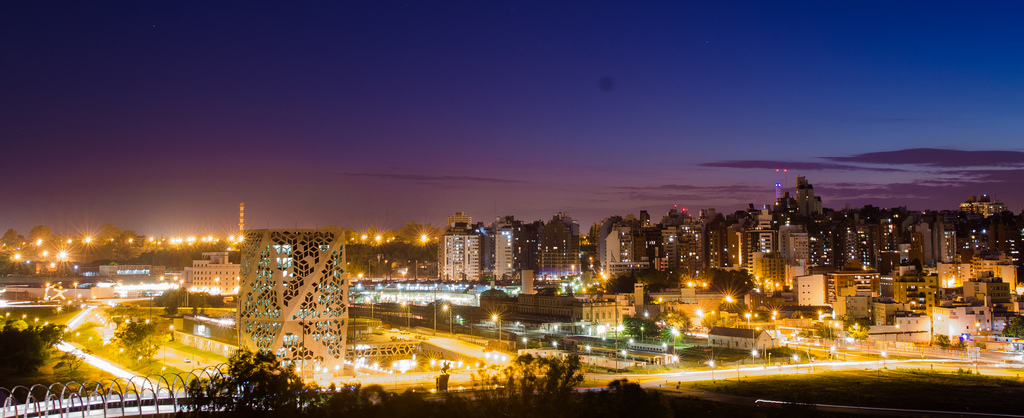
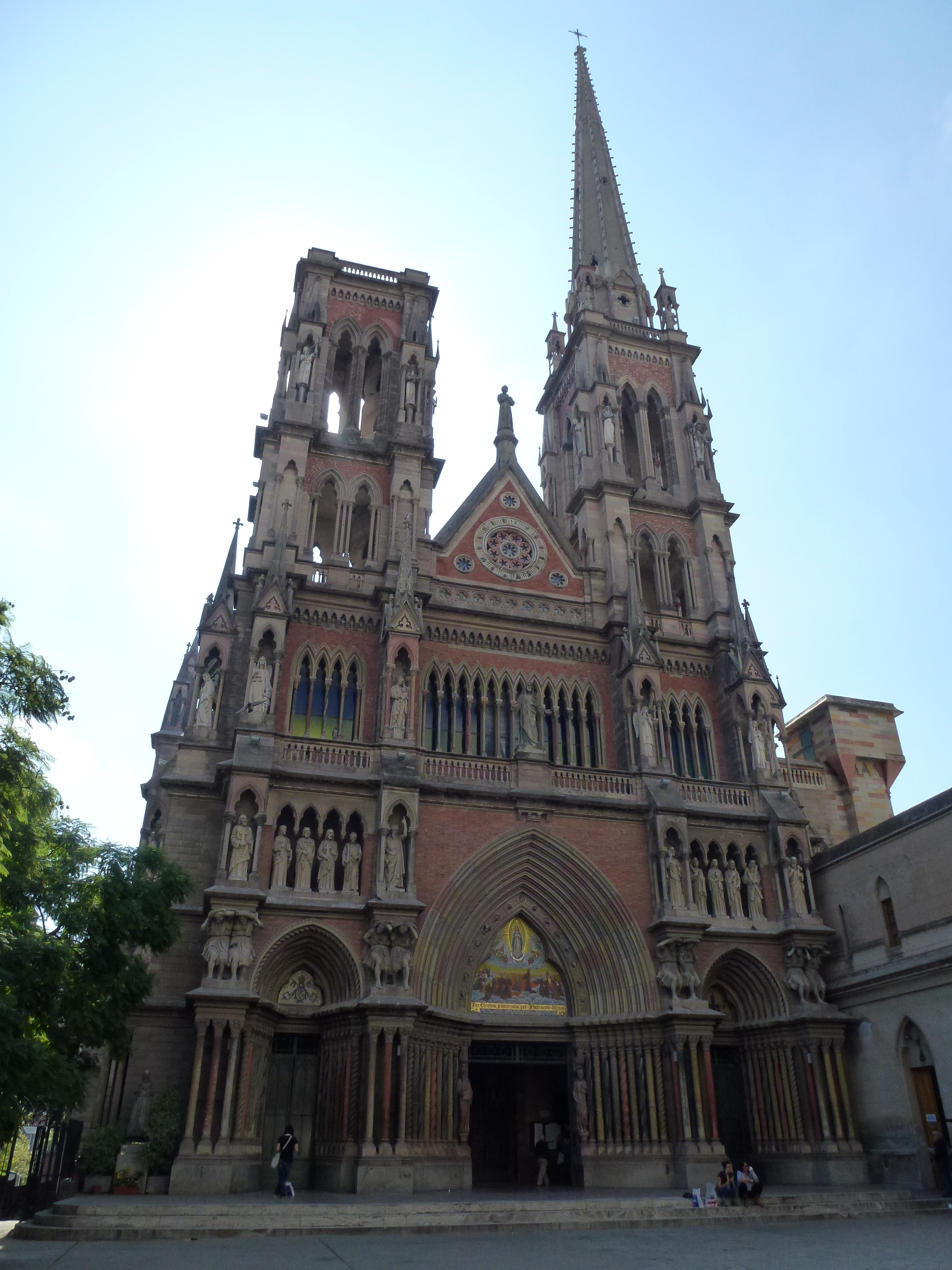
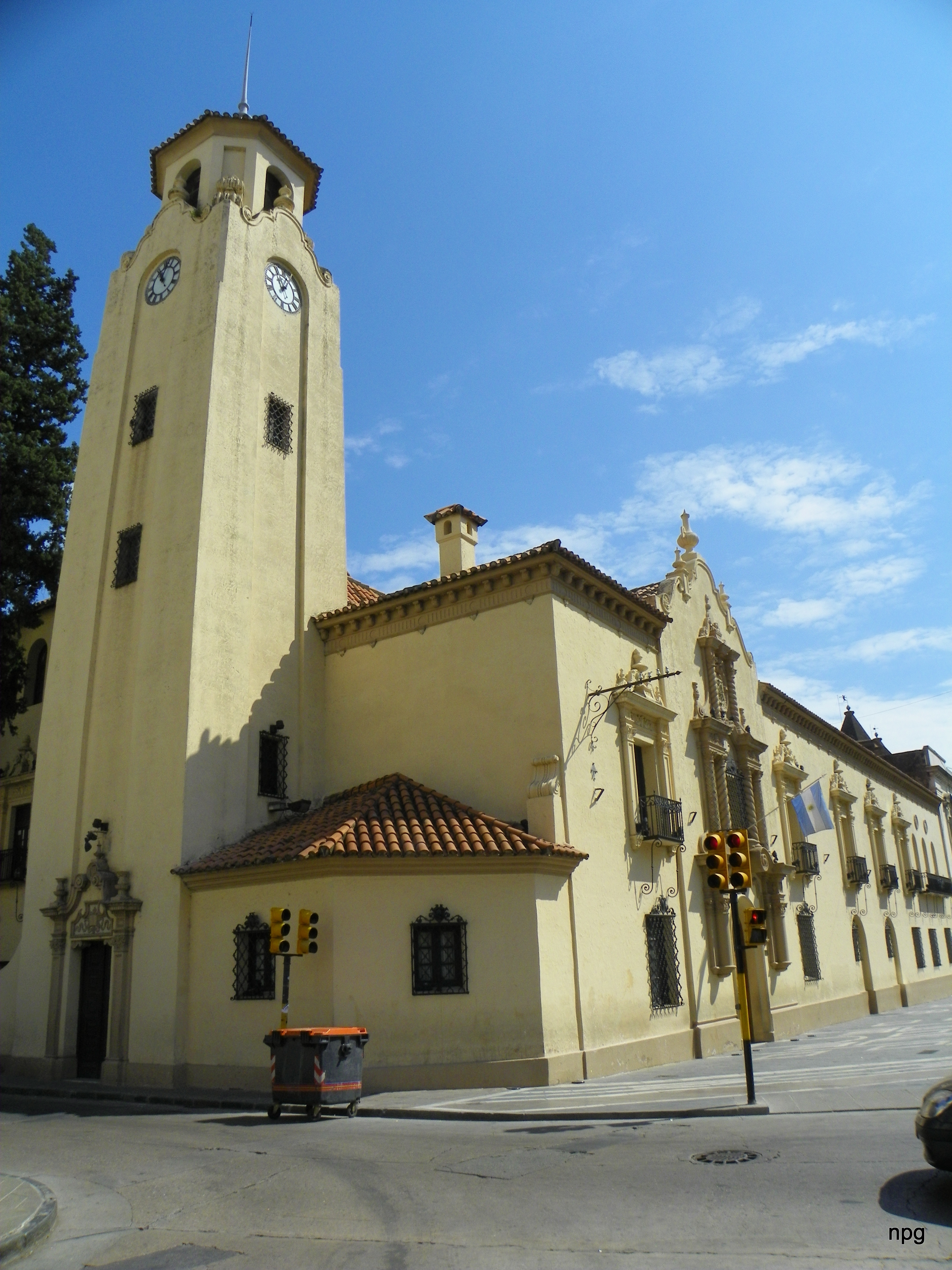
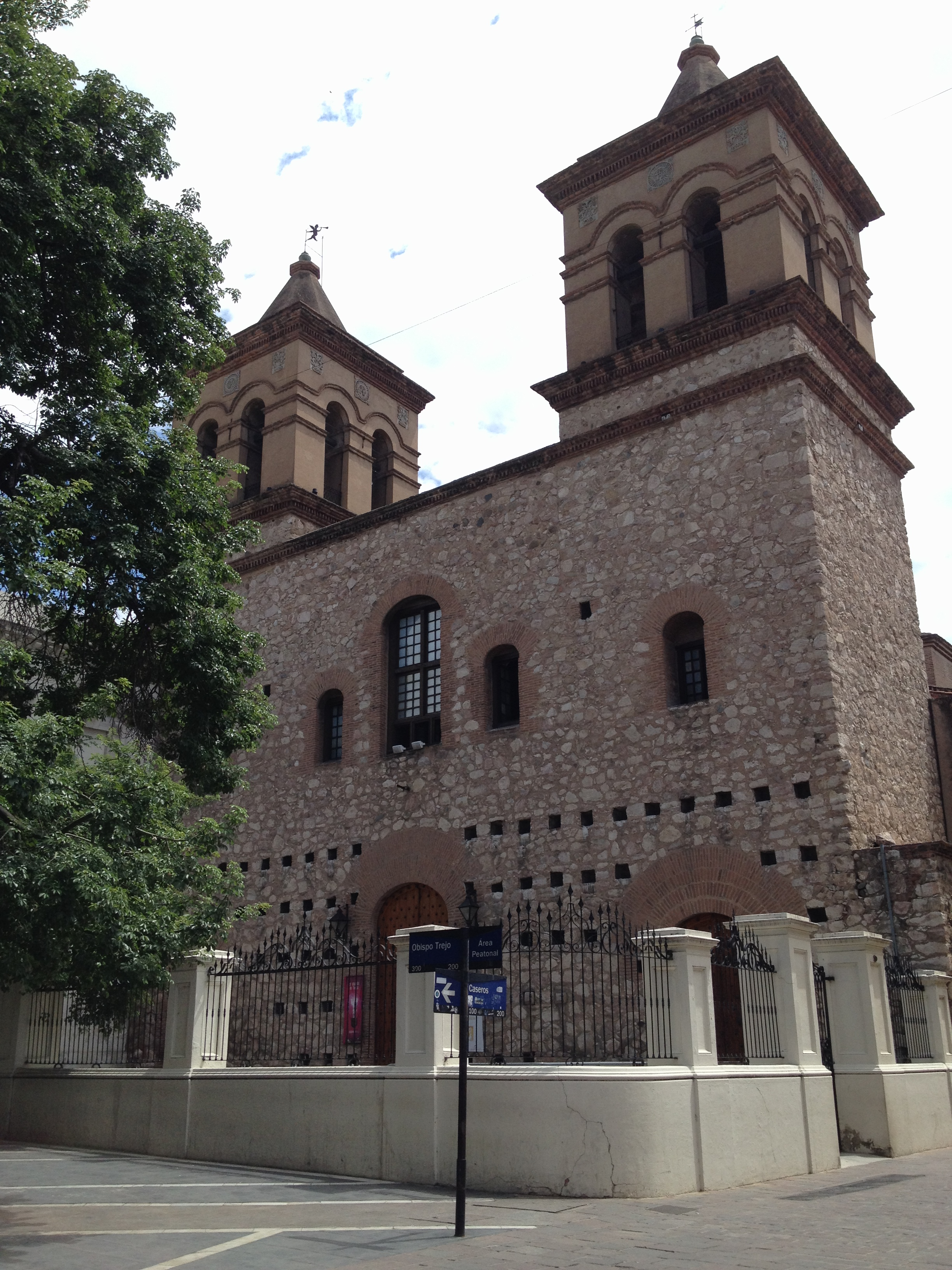
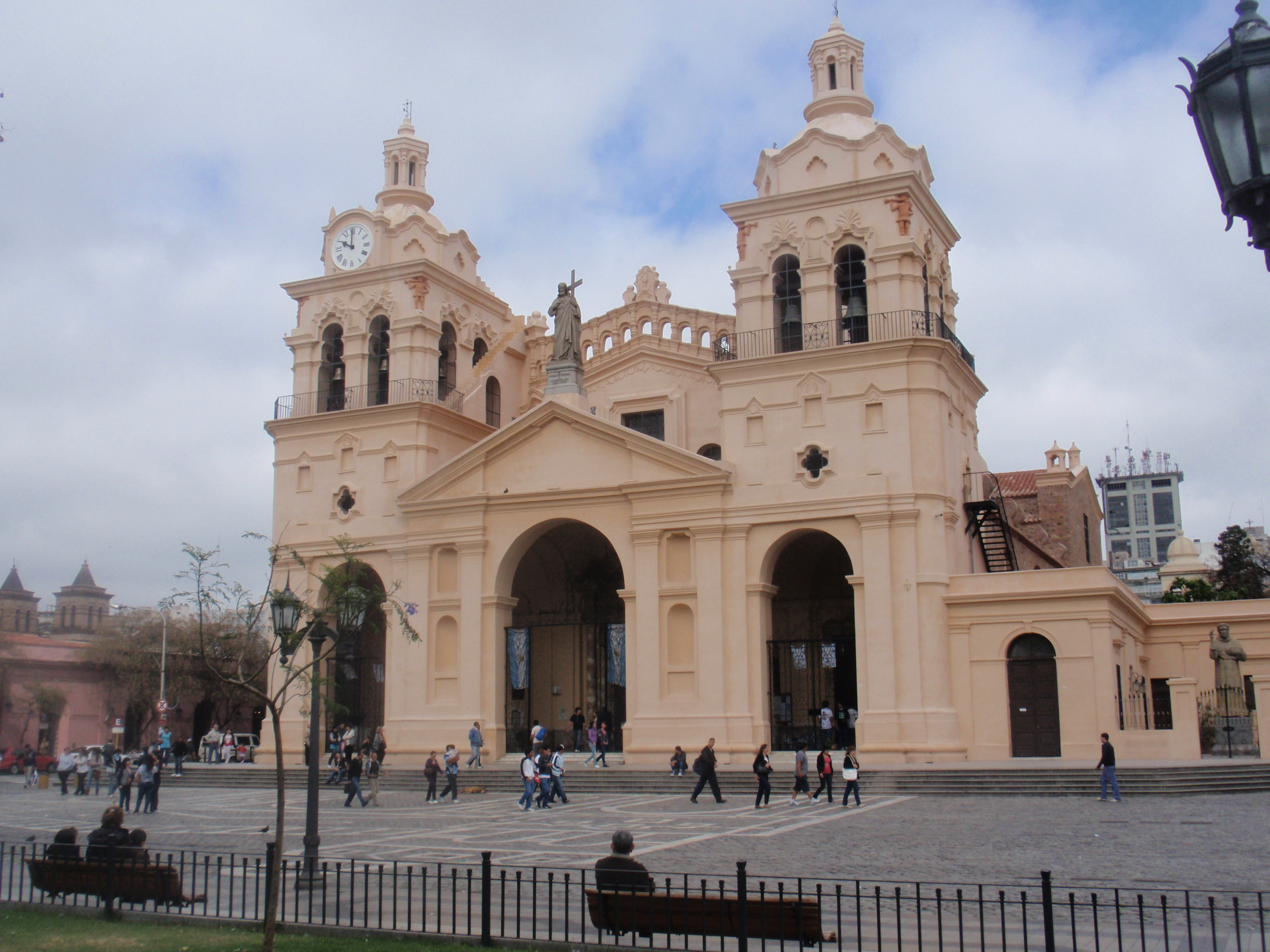
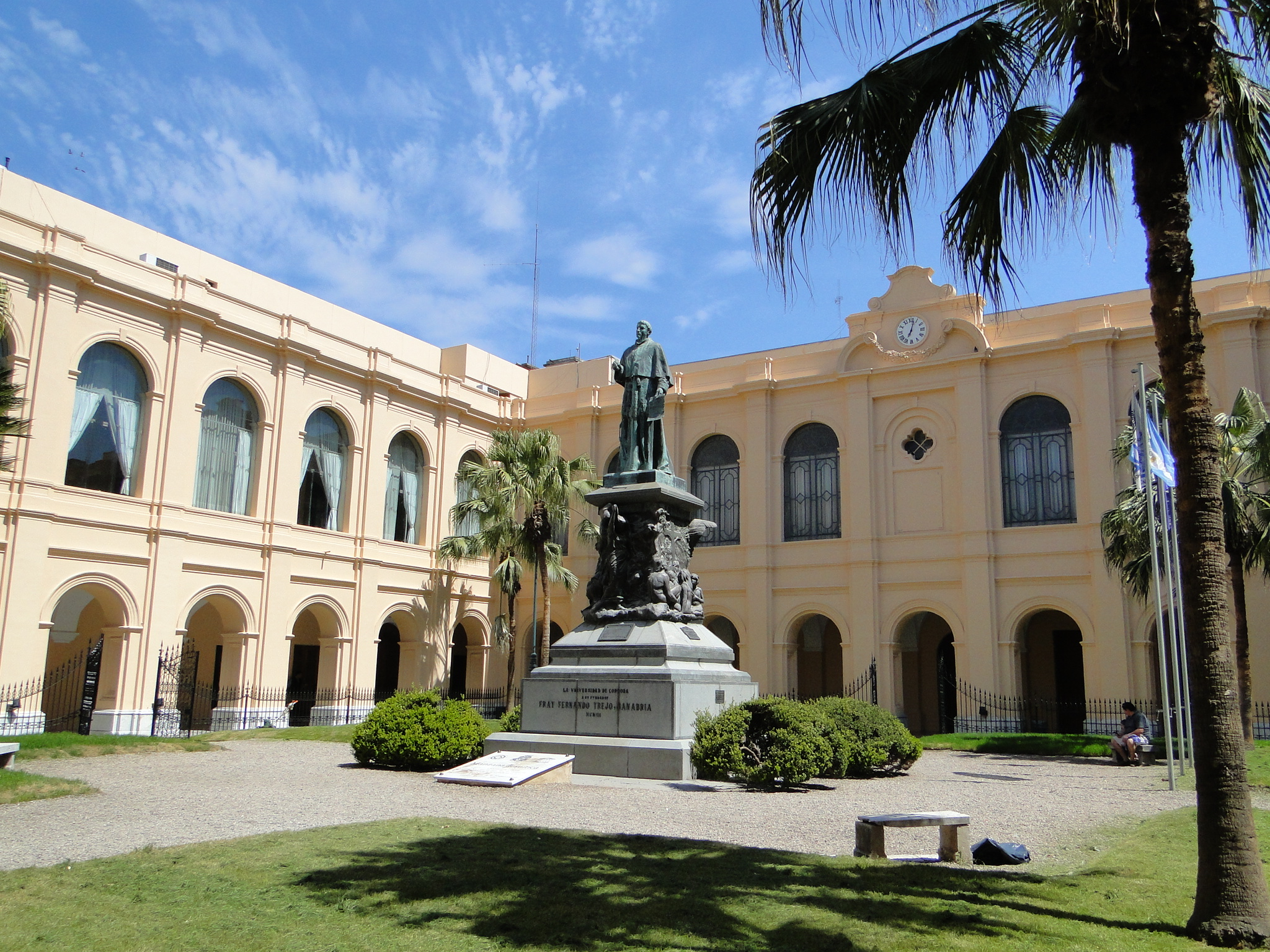
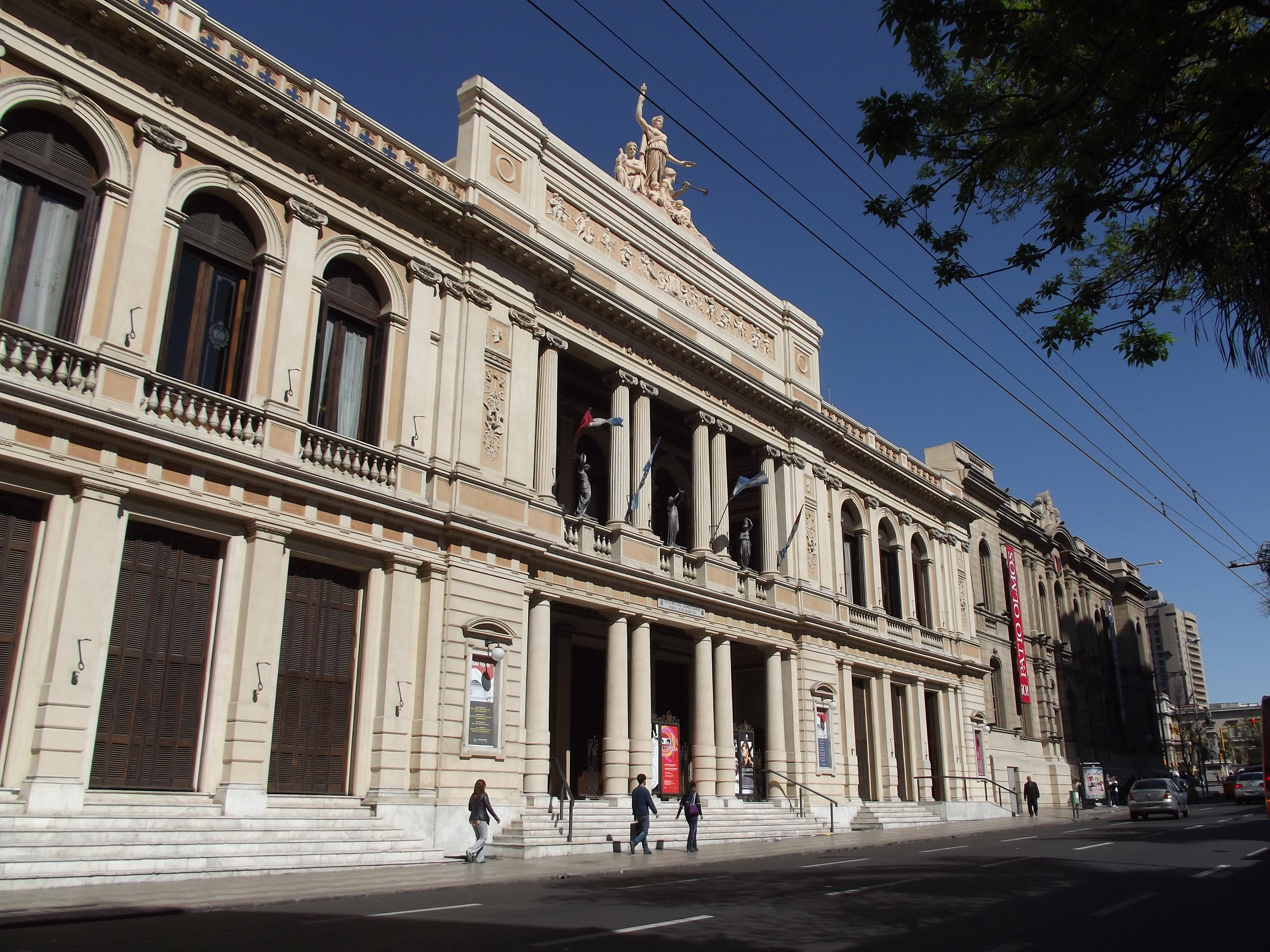
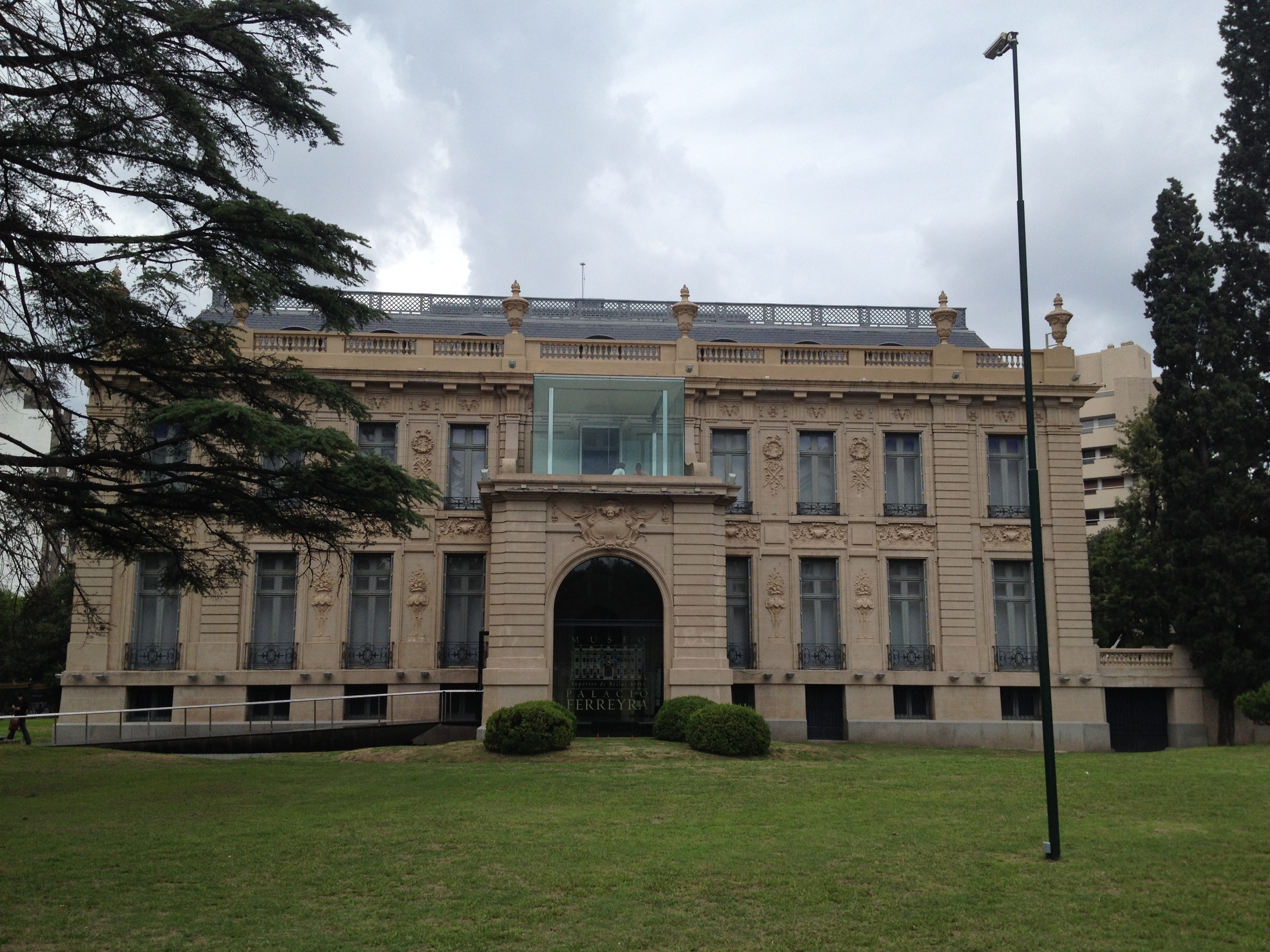
- Skyline of Córdoba from Nueva Córdoba Church of the Sacred Heart Colegio Nacional de Monserrat Church of the Society of Jesus Cathedral of Córdoba National University of Cordoba Teatro del Libertador Ferreyra Palace

- Flag Coat of arms

- Location within Córdoba Location within Argentina Location within South America
- Coordinates: 31°25′S 64°11′W
- Country: Argentina
- Province: Córdoba
- Department: Capital
- Established: 6 July 1573
- Founder: Jerónimo Luis de Cabrera
- Named for: Córdoba, Spain

Government
  - Intendant: Daniel Passerini (PJ/HXC)

Area
  - Land: 576 km^{2} (222 sq mi)
- Elevation: 352–544 m (1,155–1,785 ft)

Population (2022 census)
  - City: 1,505,250
  - Rank: 2nd in Argentina
  - Density: 2,273.5/km^{2} (5,888/sq mi)
  - Urban: 1,705,741
  - Metro: 2,156,788
- Demonym: Cordoban (Spanish: cordobés/a)

GDP (PPP, constant 2015 values)
  - Year: 2023
  - Total: $37.7 billion
  - Per capita: $23,400
- Time zone: UTC−3 (ART)
- Postal code: 5000

UNESCO World Heritage Site
- Official name: Jesuit Block and Estancias of Córdoba
- Type: Cultural
- Criteria: ii, iv
- Designated: 2000 (24th session)
- Reference no.: 995
- Region: Latin America and Caribbean

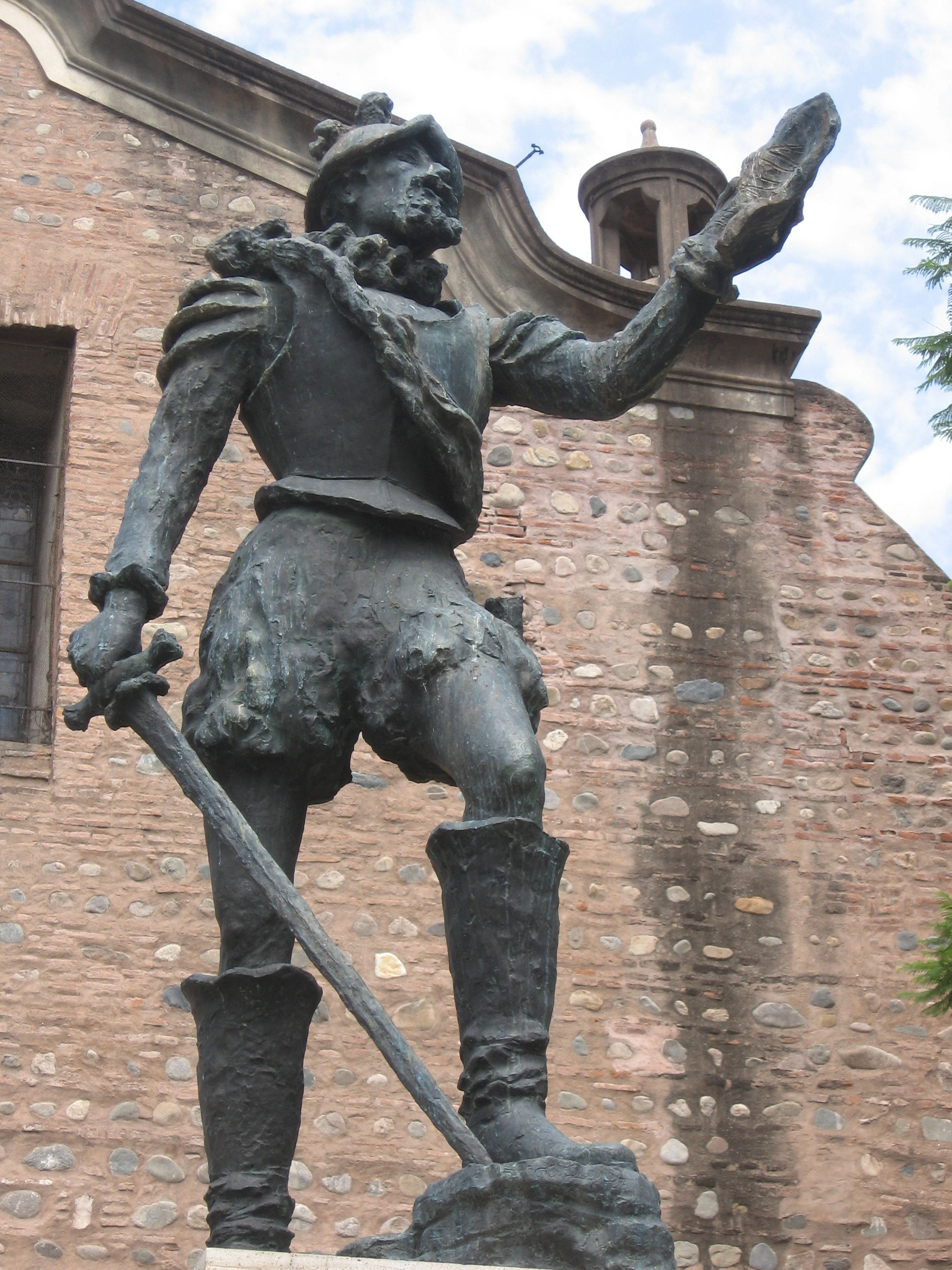
Monument to Jerónimo Luis de Cabrera, depicting his 1573 foundation of Córdoba

Córdoba (Spanish pronunciation: [ˈkoɾðoβa]) is a city in central Argentina, in the foothills of the Sierras Chicas on the Suquía River, about 700 km (435 mi) northwest of Buenos Aires. It is the capital of Córdoba Province and the second-most populous city in Argentina after Buenos Aires, with about 1.6 million urban inhabitants according to the 2020 census.

Córdoba was founded as a settlement on 6 July 1573 by Spanish conquistador Jerónimo Luis de Cabrera, who named it after the Spanish city of Córdoba. It was one of the early Spanish colonial capitals of the region of present-day Argentina (the oldest Argentine city is Santiago del Estero, founded in 1553). The National University of Córdoba, the oldest university of the country, was founded in 1613 by the Jesuit Order, and Córdoba has earned the nickname La Docta ("the learned").

Córdoba has many historical monuments preserved from the period of Spanish colonial rule, especially buildings of the Catholic Church such as the Jesuit Block (Spanish: Manzana Jesuítica), declared in 2000 as a World Heritage Site by UNESCO, which consists of a group of buildings dating from the 17th century, including the Colegio Nacional de Monserrat and the colonial university campus. The campus belongs today to the historical museum of the National University of Córdoba, which has been the second-largest university in the country since the early years of the 20th century (after the University of Buenos Aires), in number of students, faculty, and academic programs. Córdoba is also known for its historical movements, such as the Cordobazo of May 1969 and La Reforma del '18 (known as the University Revolution in English) of 1918.

== History ==
=== Early settlements ===
In 1570 the Viceroy of Peru, Francisco de Toledo, entrusted the Spanish settler Jerónimo Luis de Cabrera with the task of founding and populating a settlement in the Punilla Valley. Cabrera sent an expedition of 48 men to the territory of the Comechingones. He divided the principal column that entered through the north of the provincial territory at Villa María. The expedition of one hundred men set foot on what today is Córdoba on 24 June 1573. Cabrera called the nearby river San Juan (today Suquía). The settlement was officially founded on 6 July of the same year and named Córdoba de la Nueva Andalucía, possibly in honour of ancestors of the founder's wife, who originally came from Córdoba, Spain. The foundation of the city took place on the left bank of the river on the advice of Francisco de Torres.

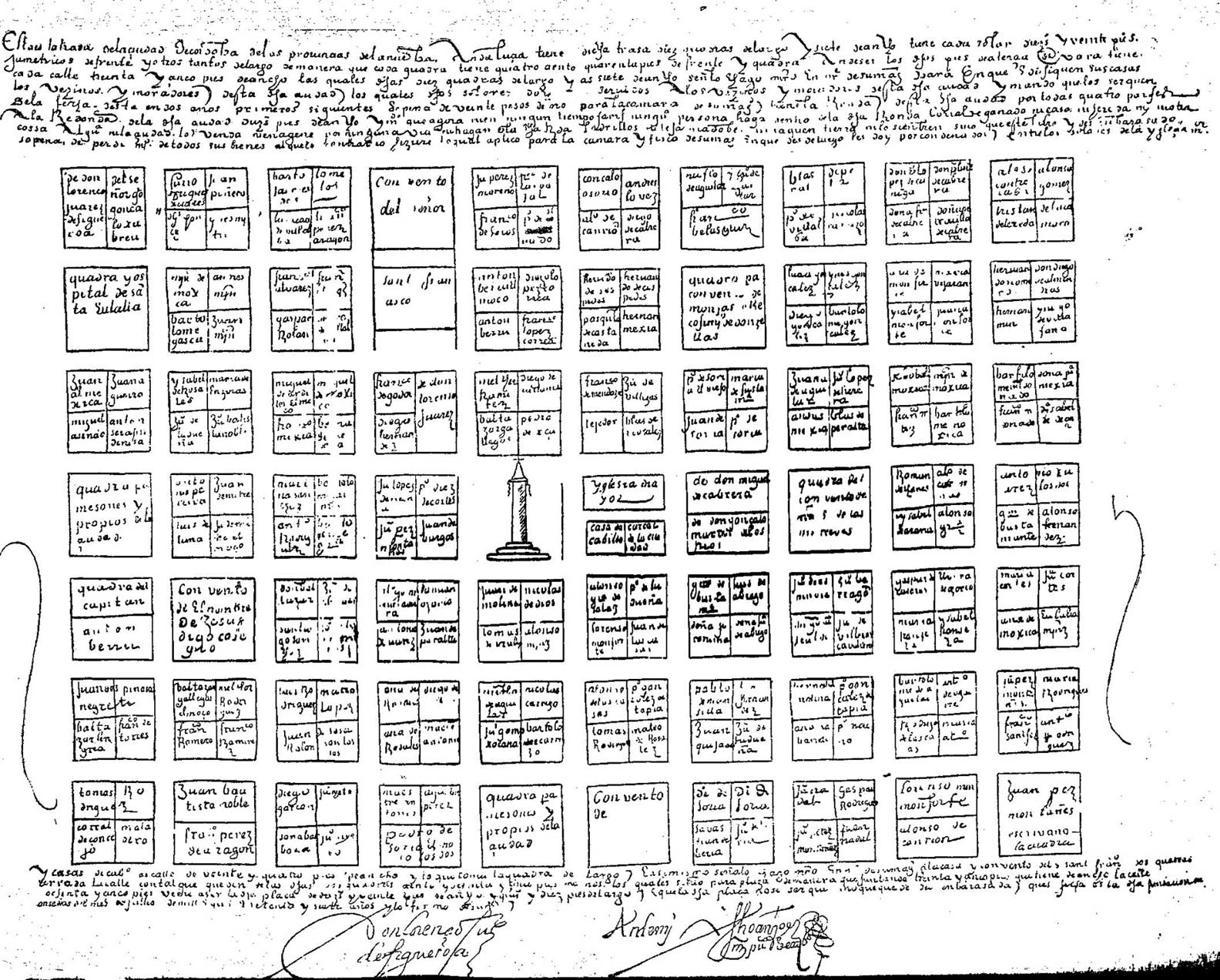
Depiction of the first map of Córdoba (1577)

The area was inhabited by aboriginal people called Comechingones, who lived in communities called ayllus. After four years, having repelled attacks by the aborigines, the settlement's authorities moved it to the opposite bank of the Suquía River in 1577. The Lieutenant Governor at the time, Don Lorenzo Suárez de Figueroa, planned the first layout of the city as a grid of 70 blocks. Once the city core had been moved to its current location, the population stabilized. The city's economy blossomed due to trade with the cities in the north.

In 1599, the religious order of the Jesuits arrived in the settlement. They established a Novitiate in 1608 and, in 1610, the Colegio Maximo, which became the University of Córdoba in 1613 (today National University of Córdoba), the fourth-oldest in the Americas. The local Jesuit church remains one of the oldest buildings in South America and contains the Monserrat Secondary School, a church, and residential buildings. To maintain such a project, the Jesuits operated five Reducciones in the surrounding fertile valleys, including Caroya, Jesús María, Santa Catalina, Alta Gracia and Candelaria.

The farm and the complex (started in 1615, had to be vacated by the Jesuits following the 1767 decree by King Charles III of Spain that expelled the Jesuit order from the continent. Franciscans then operated the Jesuits' foundations until 1853, when the Jesuits returned to the Americas. Nevertheless, the university and the high-school were nationalized a year later. Each estancia has its own church and set of buildings, around which towns grew, such as Alta Gracia, the closest to the Block.

=== Early European settlement ===
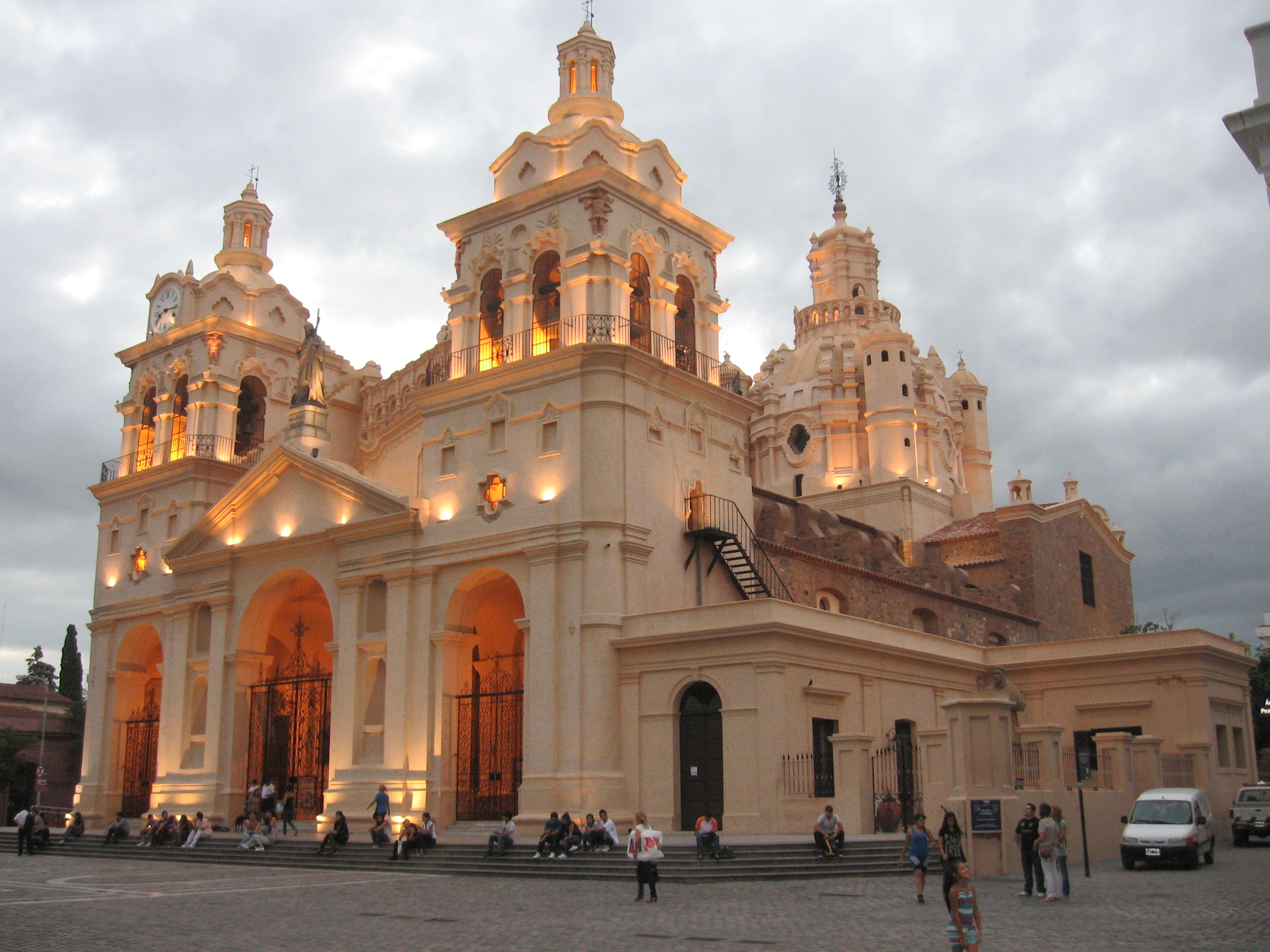
Colonial Cathedral of Córdoba

In 1776, King Carlos III created the Viceroyalty of the Río de la Plata, in which Córdoba stays in 1785 as the Government Intendency of Córdoba, including the current territories of the provinces of Córdoba, La Rioja and the region of Cuyo.

According to the 1760 census, the population of the city was 22,000 inhabitants. During the May Revolution in 1810, the widespread opinion of the most notable citizens was of continuing respecting the orders of Fernando VII, attitude assumed by the local authorities, which led to the Liniers Counter-revolution. This position was not shared by the Dean Gregorio Funes, who was adhering to the revolutionary ideas, beside supporting contact with Manuel Belgrano and Juan José Castelli.

In March 1816, the Argentine Congress met in Tucumán for an independence resolution. Córdoba sent Eduardo Pérez Bulnes, Jerónimo Salguero de Cabrera, José Antonio Cabrera, and to the Canon of the cathedral Michael Calixto of the Circle, all of them of autonomous position.

The 1820s belonged to caudillos, since the country was in full process of formation. Until 1820 a central government taken root in Buenos Aires existed, but the remaining thirteen provinces felt that after 9 July 1816 what had happened it was simply a change of commander. The Battle of Cepeda pitted the commanders of the Littoral against the inland forces.

Finally, the Federales obtained the victory, for what the country remained since then integrated by 13 autonomous provinces, on the national government having been dissolved. From this way the period known like about the Provincial Autonomies began. From this moment the provinces tried to create a federal system that was integrating them without coming to good port, this mainly for the regional differences of every province.

Two Córdoba figures stood out in this period: Governor Juan Bautista Bustos, who was an official of the Army of the North and in 1820 was supervised by the troops quartered in Arequito, a town near Córdoba, and his ally and later enemy, General José María Paz. In 1821, Bustos repelled the invasion of Córdoba on the part of Francisco Ramírez and his Chilean ally, General José Miguel Carrera. The conflict originated in a dispute with the power system that included the provinces of Buenos Aires, Córdoba and Santa Fe; according to the 1822 census the total population of Córdoba was of 11,552 inhabitants.

=== Contemporary history ===
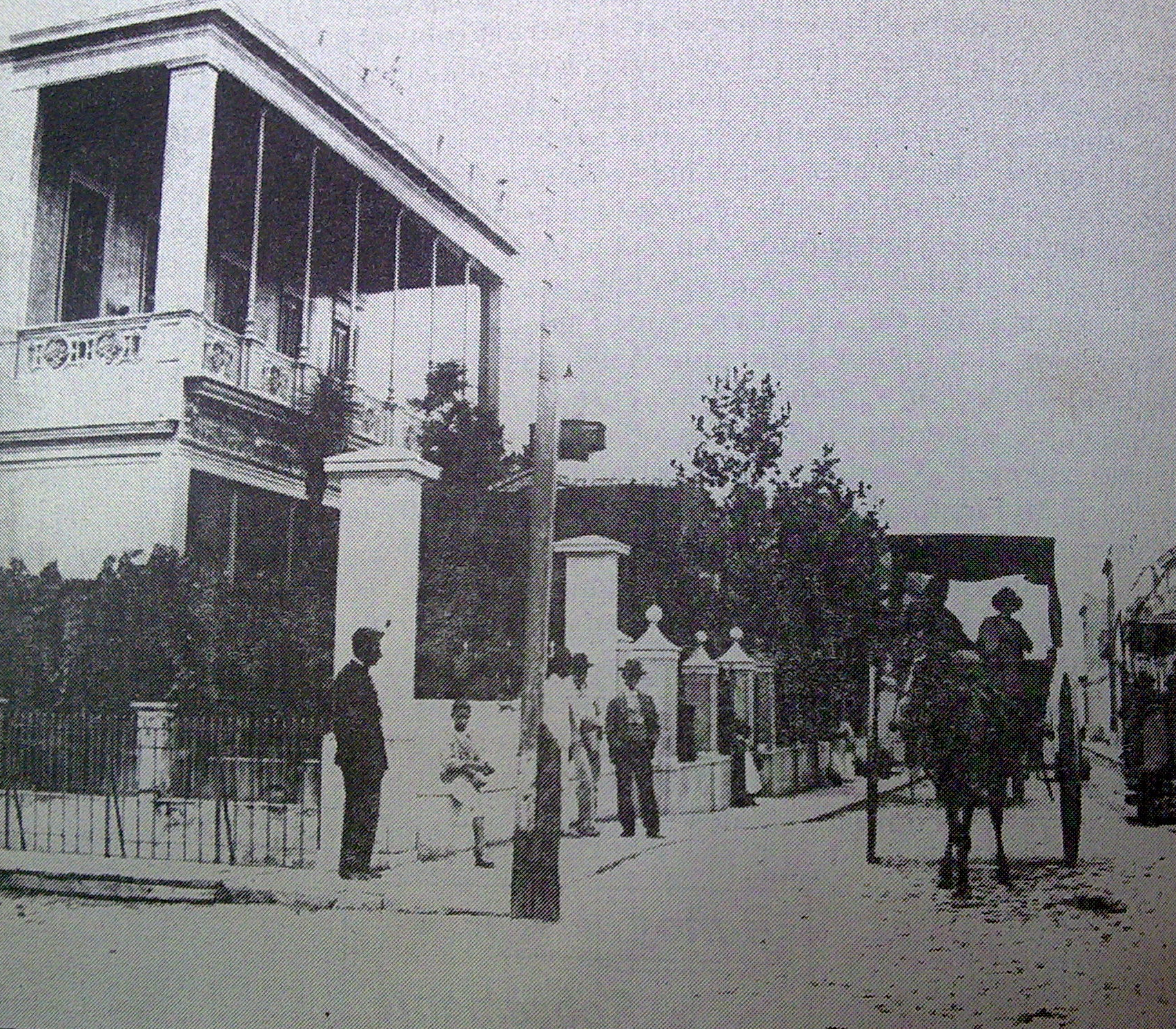
Colón Avenue, c. 1900.

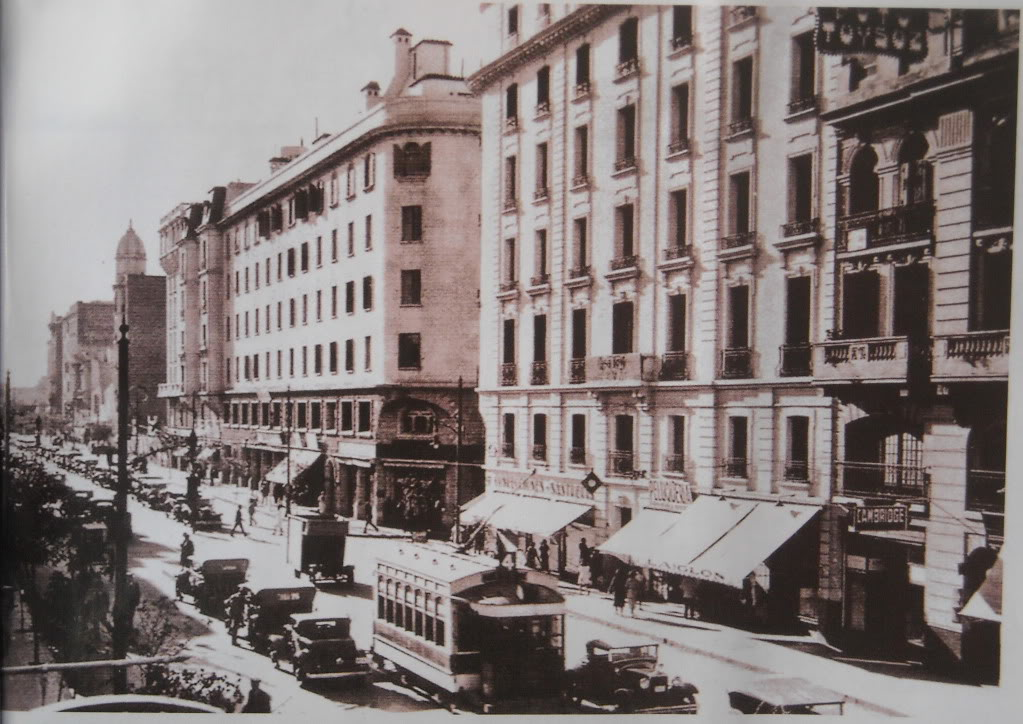
Olmos Avenue (1943).

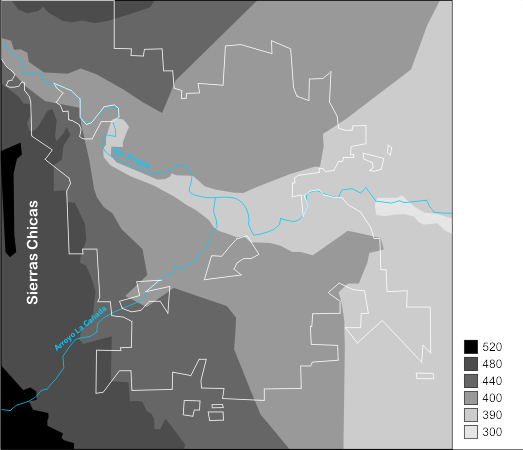
Topographical relief map of the city of Córdoba

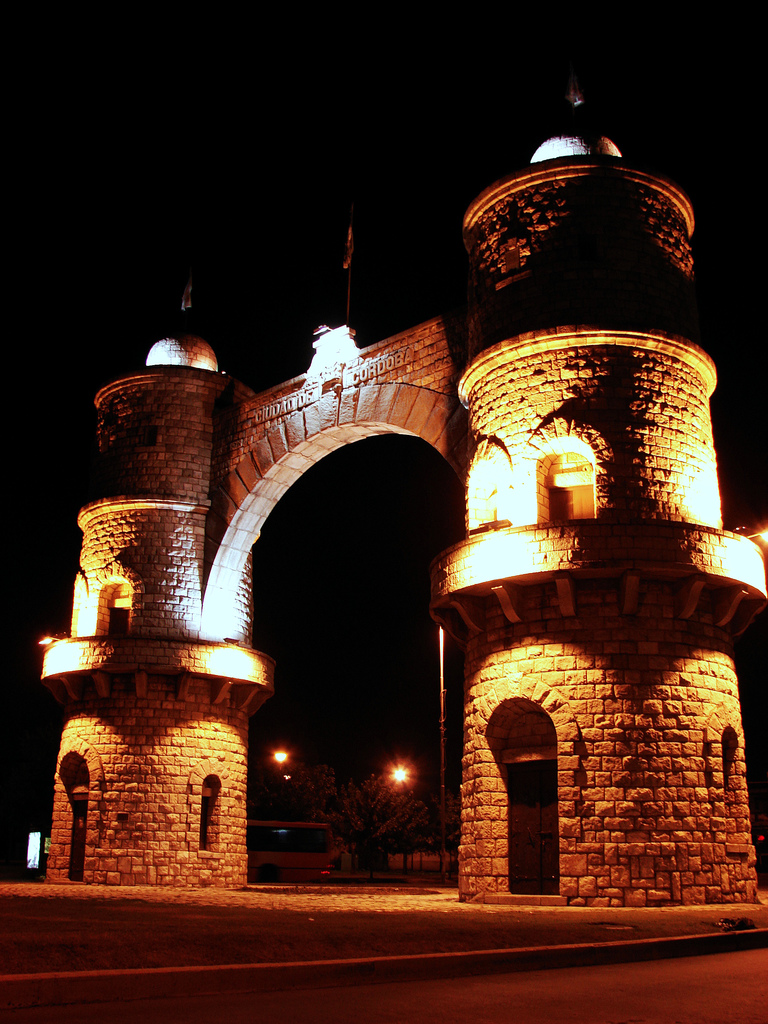
The Arch of cordoba.

At the end of the 19th century the process of national industrialization began with the height of the economic agro-exporting model, principally of meats and cereals. This process is associated with the European immigration who began to settle the city, generally possessing the education and enterprising capacity appropriate for the development of industry. The majority of these European immigrants came from Italy (initially from Piedmont, Veneto and Lombardy; later from Campania and Calabria), and Spain (mostly Galicians and Basques).

At the beginning of the 20th century the city had 90,000 inhabitants. The city's physiognomy changed considerably following the construction of new avenues, walks and public squares, as well as the installation of an electrified tram system, in 1909. In 1918, Córdoba was the epicentre of a movement known as the University Reform, which then spread to the rest of the Universities of the country, Americas and Spain.

The development of the domestic market, the British investments that facilitated European settlement, the development of the railways on the pampas rapidly industrialized the city. Córdoba's industrial sector first developed from the need to transform raw materials such as leather, meats and wool for export.

In 1927, the Military Aircraft Manufacturer (FMA) was inaugurated. The facility would become one of the most important in the world after World War II with the arrival of German technical personnel. From 1952, its production began to diversify, to constitute the base of the former Institute Aerotécnico, the state-owned company Aeronautical and Mechanical Industries of the State (IAME). Córdoba was chosen as the site of The Instituto Aerotécnico that later became the Fábrica Militar de Aviones. It employed the Focke Wulf men until President Juan Perón was ousted by a coup in 1955. Lockheed Martin purchased FMA in 1995.

Córdoba, according to the census of 1947, had almost 400,000 inhabitants (a quarter of the province's total). Subsequent industrial development led thousands of rural families to the city, doubling its population and turning Córdoba into the second largest city in Argentina, after Buenos Aires, by 1970. The city's population and economic growth moderated, afterwards, though living standards rose with the increase in the national consumption of Córdoba's industrial products, as well as the development of other sectors of economic activity.

At times rivaling Buenos Aires for its importance in national politics, Córdoba was the site of the initial mutiny leading to the 1955 Revolución Libertadora that deposed President Juan Perón and the setting for the 1969 Cordobazo, a series of violent labor and student protests that ultimately led to elections in 1973. Córdoba's current economic diversity is due to a vigorous services sector and the demand for agro-industrial and railway equipment and, in particular, the introduction of U.S. and European automakers after 1954.

== Geography ==
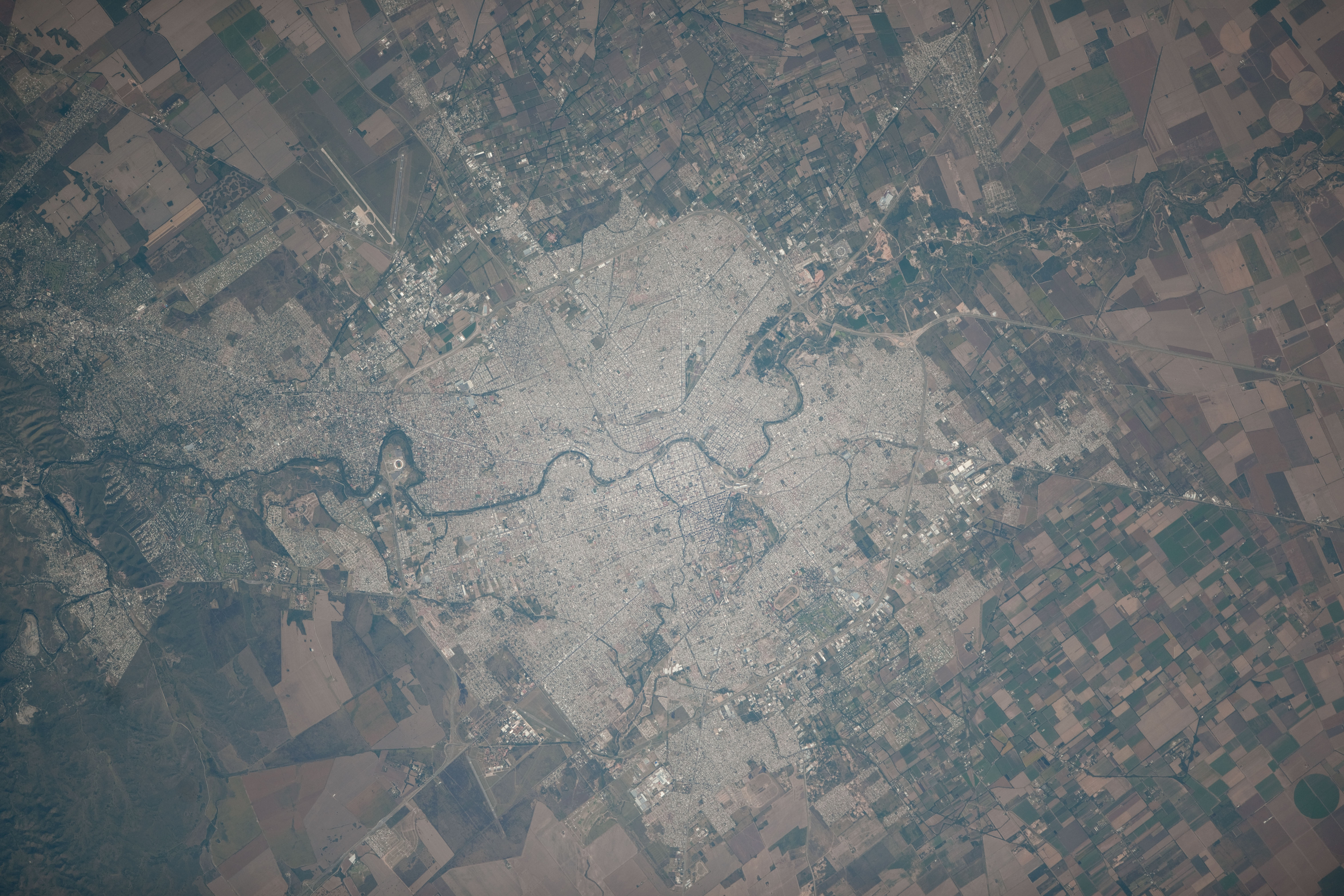
Córdoba from space

Location of Córdoba.: 1. Argentina; 2. Córdoba Province; 3. Córdoba City

The city's geographic location is 31°25′S 64°11′W, taking as a point of reference San Martín Square in downtown Córdoba. The relative location of the municipal common land, is in the south hemisphere of the globe, to the south of the South American subcontinent, in the geographical centre – west of Argentina and of the province of Córdoba; to a distance of 702 km (436 mi) from Buenos Aires, 401 km (249 mi) from the city of Rosario and (340 km (211 mi)) west of Santa Fe.

As per the provincial laws No. 778 14 December 1878, Not. 927 20 October 1883, and Not. 1295 29 December 1893, the limits of the city of Córdoba are delineated in the northern part, South, East and West located to 12 km (7 mi) from San Martín Square which means that the common land has 24 km (15 mi) from side. The city, adjoins in the northern territory with Colón Department summarizing a total surface of 562.

=== Land and Water ===
The city is located in the plain of the Humid Pampa, to the east of the oriental cord of Córdoba Hills or Sierras Chicas, also known as the Sierras Cordobesas, which has an average height of 550 m. It spreads at the foot of the mount, on both banks of the River Suquía, and flows into the San Roque reservoir; from there, the Primero River goes east into the plains surrounding the city of Córdoba.

Once inside the city, the La Cañada stream meets the Rio Primero near the city centre area. Two kilometers to the east, Isla de los Patos (Ducks Island) was repopulated with ducks and swans in the 1980s. It was reported in March 2006 that a large number of ducks had died due to unspecified causes. Pollution caused by chemical waste is suspected as the cause, but avian influenza is also being investigated.

Beyond the city limits, the river flows towards the Algarrobos swamp and ends its course on the southern coast of the Mar Chiquita (or Mar de Ansenuza) salt lake. All in all, the river has a length of approximately 200 km (124 mi) and carries, on average, 9.7 m³/s, with minimum of 2 m³/s and maximum of 24 m³/s with a peak during the summer months.

Pollution of the water and of the riverbank is a major environmental issue in Córdoba. Periodic cleaning operations are carried out to increase the quality of the water and to preserve the viability of fishing, both in the San Roque reservoir area and downstream.

=== Climate ===
The climate of the city of Córdoba, and that of most of the province, is humid subtropical (Cwa, according to the Köppen climate classification), moderated by the Pampas winds, cold winds that blow from the South-western quadrant, which originate in Antarctica.

There are four marked seasons. Summers run from late November till early March, and bring days between 28 °C (82 °F) and 33 °C (91 °F) and night between 15 °C (59 °F) and 19 °C (66 °F) with frequent thunderstorms. Heat waves are common, and bring days with temperatures over 38 °C (100 °F) and hot, sticky nights; however, Pampero winds are sure to bring relief with thunderstorms and a day or two of cool, crisp weather: nighttime temperatures can easily descend to 12 °C (54 °F) or less, but the heat starts building up right away the next day.

By late February or early March, nights start getting cooler and, in March, highs average 27 °C (81 °F) and lows 15 °C (59 °F); after cold fronts, lows below 10 °C (50 °F) and highs below 20 °C (68 °F) are recorded in this month. April is significantly drier already; highs reach 24 °C (75 °F) on average and lows 12 °C (54 °F), creating very pleasant conditions. In some years, temperatures can approach or even reach the freezing point in late April; however, heat waves of up to 33 °C (91 °F) are still possible, but nights are rarely as hot as in the summer. May usually brings the first frosts, and very dry weather, with under 20 mm (1 in) of rain expected. Highs average 21 °C (70 °F) and lows average 8 °C (46 °F); however, when cold waves reach the area, highs may stay below 8 °C (46 °F) and lows can be well below freezing.

Winter lasts from late May till early September, and bring average highs of 18 °C (64 °F) and lows of 4 °C (39 °F). However, strong northwesterly winds downsloping from the mountains can bring what is known as "Veranito" (little summer) with highs of up to 30 °C (86 °F) or more and dusty, windy weather (but dry, pleasant nights) for 2–3 days. Conversely, when storms stall over the Atlantic coast, there may be several days of drizzle and cool weather, and when cold air masses invade the country from Antarctica (several times every winter), there may be one or two days with temperatures around 6 °C (43 °F), drizzle and high winds (which combined make it feel very cold), followed by dry, cold weather with nighttime lows between 0 °C (32 °F) and −5 °C (23 °F) and daytime highs between 8 °C (46 °F) and 15 °C (59 °F). Snowfall is very rare in the city, but more frequent in the outskirts where the Sierras begin; sleet may fall every once in a while. The record low temperature for Córdoba is −8.3 °C (17.1 °F). In June, only 3.5 mm (0.1 in) of rain are expected, compared to 168 mm (6.6 in) in January.

Spring is extremely variable and windy: there may be long stretches of cool, dry weather and cold nights followed by intense heat waves up to 38 °C (100 °F), followed by the most severe thunderstorms with hail and high winds. It is not unusual to see temperatures drop 20 °C (36 °F) from one day to another, or to have frost following extreme heat. Drought is most common in this season, when the normal summer rainfall arrives later than expected. By October, days are warm at 26 °C (79 °F) but nights remain cold at 11 °C (52 °F), by late November, the weather resembles summer weather with cooler nights.

The wealthier suburbs west of the city are located at slightly higher altitudes, which allows cool breezes to blow in the summer, bringing drier, comfortable nights during hotter periods, and more regular frost in the winter. Generally speaking, Córdoba's daytime temperatures are very slightly warmer than Buenos Aires' but nighttime lows are usually cooler, especially in the winter. This, combined with a lower humidity and the possibility of fleeing to higher altitudes minutes away from the city centre, makes the climate a bit more comfortable than in the capital.

The variations or thermal extents are greater than in Buenos Aires, and lower in annual rainfall: 750 mm (30 in) / year. The annual average temperature calculated during the 20th century was 18 °C. In January, the hottest month of the austral summer, the average maximum is 31 °C and the minimum 17 °C. In July, the coldest month of the year, the average temperatures are between 19 °C and 3 °C. In winter it is very frequent that temperatures rise above 30 °C, due to the influence of the wind Zonda.

Due to the extension of the metropolitan area, there exists a difference of 5 °C between the central area and the Greater Córdoba. The central district, a dense high-rise area is located in a depression, and it is the core of an important heat island. In addition the city presents a phenomenon of smog, but not so dense as to present health concerns.

Climate data for Córdoba Observatory, Córdoba Province, Argentina (1991–2020, extremes 1961–present)
Month	Jan	Feb	Mar	Apr	May	Jun	Jul	Aug	Sep	Oct	Nov	Dec	Year
Record high °C (°F)	42.5 (108.5)	41.4 (106.5)	39.4 (102.9)	36.5 (97.7)	35.5 (95.9)	32.8 (91.0)	34.3 (93.7)	38.2 (100.8)	41.1 (106.0)	42.0 (107.6)	43.7 (110.7)	43.5 (110.3)	43.7 (110.7)
Mean daily maximum °C (°F)	31.2 (88.2)	29.4 (84.9)	28.1 (82.6)	25.0 (77.0)	21.3 (70.3)	19.0 (66.2)	18.4 (65.1)	21.5 (70.7)	23.8 (74.8)	26.3 (79.3)	29.1 (84.4)	31.0 (87.8)	25.3 (77.5)
Daily mean °C (°F)	24.7 (76.5)	23.2 (73.8)	21.8 (71.2)	18.4 (65.1)	14.7 (58.5)	11.6 (52.9)	10.8 (51.4)	13.5 (56.3)	16.2 (61.2)	19.4 (66.9)	22.1 (71.8)	24.2 (75.6)	18.4 (65.1)
Mean daily minimum °C (°F)	18.9 (66.0)	17.8 (64.0)	16.5 (61.7)	13.3 (55.9)	9.9 (49.8)	6.4 (43.5)	5.5 (41.9)	7.4 (45.3)	10.0 (50.0)	13.4 (56.1)	15.8 (60.4)	18.1 (64.6)	12.8 (55.0)
Record low °C (°F)	7.6 (45.7)	5.1 (41.2)	2.5 (36.5)	−0.5 (31.1)	−4.3 (24.3)	−6.1 (21.0)	−7.1 (19.2)	−4.9 (23.2)	−2.6 (27.3)	1.5 (34.7)	3.7 (38.7)	7.0 (44.6)	−7.1 (19.2)
Average precipitation mm (inches)	121.6 (4.79)	126.6 (4.98)	99.9 (3.93)	61.2 (2.41)	20.7 (0.81)	6.7 (0.26)	6.7 (0.26)	8.0 (0.31)	33.7 (1.33)	76.9 (3.03)	109.7 (4.32)	143.9 (5.67)	815.6 (32.11)
Average precipitation days (≥ 0.1 mm)	11.1	10.4	9.1	7.4	5.4	2.7	2.4	1.7	4.6	7.9	10.2	11.5	84.4
Average snowy days	0.0	0.0	0.0	0.0	0.1	0.0	0.1	0.0	0.1	0.0	0.0	0.0	0.2
Average relative humidity (%)	65.1	70.5	71.9	72.0	73.6	71.1	65.8	55.7	55.8	59.4	59.6	61.3	65.1
Mean monthly sunshine hours	248.0	220.4	226.3	195.0	173.6	165.0	189.1	220.1	216.0	232.5	240.0	235.6	2,561.6
Mean daily sunshine hours	8.0	7.8	7.3	6.5	5.6	5.5	6.1	7.1	7.2	7.5	8.0	7.6	7.0
Percentage possible sunshine	60	62	54	55	52	49	53	60	60	60	62	57	57
Source 1: Servicio Meteorológico Nacional
Source 2: NOAA (percent sun 1961–1990)

Climate data for Ingeniero Aeronáutico Ambrosio L.V. Taravella International Airport (1991–2020, extremes 1949–present)
Month	Jan	Feb	Mar	Apr	May	Jun	Jul	Aug	Sep	Oct	Nov	Dec	Year
Record high °C (°F)	40.8 (105.4)	40.5 (104.9)	38.2 (100.8)	35.8 (96.4)	37.0 (98.6)	33.8 (92.8)	33.5 (92.3)	37.4 (99.3)	40.0 (104.0)	41.0 (105.8)	43.5 (110.3)	42.4 (108.3)	43.5 (110.3)
Mean daily maximum °C (°F)	29.9 (85.8)	28.2 (82.8)	27.0 (80.6)	24.1 (75.4)	20.6 (69.1)	18.3 (64.9)	17.7 (63.9)	20.8 (69.4)	23.0 (73.4)	25.4 (77.7)	28.0 (82.4)	29.7 (85.5)	24.4 (75.9)
Daily mean °C (°F)	23.5 (74.3)	22.0 (71.6)	20.5 (68.9)	17.3 (63.1)	13.7 (56.7)	10.6 (51.1)	9.8 (49.6)	12.4 (54.3)	15.2 (59.4)	18.3 (64.9)	20.9 (69.6)	22.9 (73.2)	17.3 (63.1)
Mean daily minimum °C (°F)	17.5 (63.5)	16.5 (61.7)	15.1 (59.2)	11.9 (53.4)	8.4 (47.1)	4.7 (40.5)	3.7 (38.7)	5.5 (41.9)	8.1 (46.6)	11.6 (52.9)	14.2 (57.6)	16.6 (61.9)	11.2 (52.2)
Record low °C (°F)	5.7 (42.3)	1.6 (34.9)	1.0 (33.8)	−1.8 (28.8)	−5.8 (21.6)	−8.0 (17.6)	−8.3 (17.1)	−6.5 (20.3)	−4.6 (23.7)	0.3 (32.5)	0.1 (32.2)	1.7 (35.1)	−8.3 (17.1)
Average precipitation mm (inches)	121.9 (4.80)	140.2 (5.52)	116.9 (4.60)	65.3 (2.57)	24.4 (0.96)	6.6 (0.26)	6.0 (0.24)	8.5 (0.33)	32.6 (1.28)	71.5 (2.81)	115.9 (4.56)	146.5 (5.77)	856.3 (33.71)
Average precipitation days (≥ 0.1 mm)	9.6	9.3	8.5	6.6	4.6	2.0	2.0	1.3	1.7	6.7	9.0	10.2	73.5
Average snowy days	0.0	0.0	0.0	0.0	0.0	0.1	0.1	0.1	0.0	0.0	0.0	0.0	0.2
Average relative humidity (%)	68.1	74.0	75.1	73.1	73.5	69.4	63.5	55.4	55.0	60.5	60.9	63.3	66.0
Mean monthly sunshine hours	266.6	214.7	220.1	186.0	167.4	162.0	192.2	220.1	213.0	232.5	258.0	272.8	2,605.4
Mean daily sunshine hours	8.6	7.6	7.1	6.2	5.4	5.4	6.2	7.1	7.1	7.5	8.6	8.8	7.1
Percentage possible sunshine	55.1	57.0	55.8	54.3	48.8	49.2	63.3	60.9	56.4	53.8	59.5	66.9	56.7
Source 1: Servicio Meteorológico Nacional (percent sun 1991–2000)
Source 2: Meteo Climat (record highs and lows)

== Demographics ==
Urban growth of Córdoba from 1573 to 2007

Population statistics
Figure	Value
Population	1,357,200
Male population	649,955
Female population	683,433
Population growth	1.0%
Birth rate	19/1,000
Death rate	4.9/1,000
Infant mortality rate	18.1/1,000
Life expectancy	75.6 years

=== Ethnicity ===
The largest ethnic groups in Córdoba are Italians/Italian Argentine and Spaniards/Spanish Argentine (mostly Galicians and Basques/Basque Argentine). Waves of immigrants from other European countries arrived in the late 19th and early 20th centuries. From the rest of Western Europe came immigrants from Switzerland, Germany, United Kingdom, Ireland and Scandinavia (especially Sweden). Other Europeans also arrived from nations such as Croatia, Poland, Hungary, Russia, Romania, Ukraine, Armenia and the Balkans (especially Greece, Serbia and Montenegro). By the 1910s, 43 percent of the city population was non-native Argentine after immigration rates peaked. Important Lebanese, Syrian and Armenian communities have had a significant presence in commerce and civic life since the beginning of the 20th century.

Most immigrants, regardless of origin, settled in the city or around Greater Córdoba. However, in the early stages of immigration, some formed settlements (especially agricultural settlements) in different parts of the city, often encouraged by the Argentine government and/or sponsored by private individuals and organizations.

=== Demographic distribution ===
Córdoba is the second largest city in the country in population and concentrates 40.9% of the Córdoba Province population of 3,216,993 inhabitants and represents almost 3.3% of the Argentine population, which is 43 million inhabitants. Driven by migration both domestic and from abroad, the city's rate of population growth was an elevated 3.2% annually from 1914 to 1960; but, it has been declining steadily since then, and has averaged around 0.4% a year, since the national census of 2001.

According to the last provincial census of 2008, the city has 1,315,540 inhabitants, representing an increase of 3.78% with regard to the 1,267,521 registered during the national census of 2001. Greater Córdoba is the metropolitan area of the city of Córdoba, a union of medium localities of the department Colón, from the north to the south. Greater Córdoba is the second-largest urban agglomeration in Argentina in both population and surface area.

The growth of the metropolitan area was not equal in all directions, it spreads approximately up to 50 km (31 mi) to the northwest of the Córdoba city centre in a thin succession of small localities. This is almost the maximum distance from the Buenos Aires city center to the most distant of its metropolitan area points; whereas in the rest of the cardinal points it comes to 15 km (9 mi).

The city receives a constant flow of students from the northeastern and southwestern regions of Argentina and of other South American countries, owed principally to the National University of Córdoba, which increases gradually the city population. Córdoba grows constantly, expanding especially towards the southern areas of Alta Gracia and Villa Carlos Paz.

Demographic Evolution
	1810	1869	1895	1914	1947	1960	1970	1980	1991	2001	2010
Population	9,080	34,458	54,763	134,935	386,828	586,015	801,771	990,968	1,179,372	1,284,582	1,330,023
Annual population growth rate		2.3	1.8	4.9	3.2	3.2	3.2	2.1	1.6	0.9	0.4

== Urban structure ==
Land use map of Córdoba

The use of the city land is regulated by the municipality, which consists of approximately 26,177 hectares of urban area (40.24%), 12,267 hectares of industrially dominant area (21.3%), 16,404 hectares of rural area (28.45%) and 5,750 hectares for other uses such as military purposes or institutional spaces (9.98%) of the total area of the city.

Green spaces include different types of spaces, from small squares, up to urban, green linear parks of different scales as the river Suquia, bicycle pathways and highways. The surface area of green spaces supported by the Municipality of Córdoba adds up to approximately 1645 hectares.

The historical centre is shaped by quadrangular blocks of some hundred thirty meters of side. The disposition of the neighborhoods and principal avenues is radial. From the city centre district large avenues lead out to the most peripheral neighborhoods. In conformity with demographic growth, the city has expanded principally to the northwest and to the southeast, following the trace of the National Route 9.

The governor, Juan Schiaretti, finalized the Circunvalaciónon on 6 July 2019, with completing the building of the last 2,8 km of the route from La Cañanada to Fuerza Aerea. This ended the construction of the 47 km long ring road motorway, which takes almost 34 minutes to complete.

=== Districts ===
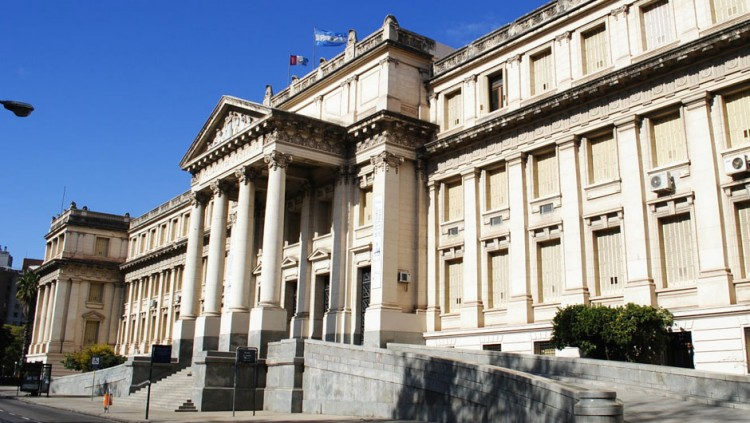
The Cordoba Courthouse.

Córdoba is home to one of the most important financial districts in South America. The district is home to the Bank of Córdoba and other private banking institutions. Sightseeing places include San Martín Square, the Jesuit Block (declared UNESCO World Heritage Site) and the Genaro Pérez Museum. The streets mostly follow a regular checkerboard pattern, and the main thoroughfares are Vélez Sarsfield, Colón, General Paz, Dean Funes Avenue, and 27 April Street. The point of origin of the city is San Martin Square, surrounded by the Municipality and Central Post Office.

Downtown Córdoba is home to large shopping malls, notably Patio Olmos. This mall is the result of a massive regeneration effort, recycling and refurbishing the west side old warehouses into elegant offices and commercial centres. An important cultural point of interest is the Palacio Ferreyra, a mansion built in 1916 based on plans by the French architect, Ernest Sanson. The Ferreyra palace was converted into the Evita Perón Museum of Fine Arts (the city's second) in 2007. Located at the corner of Hipólito Yrigoyen and Chacabuco Avenues, it has now been restored and adapted to house the city's principal art gallery.

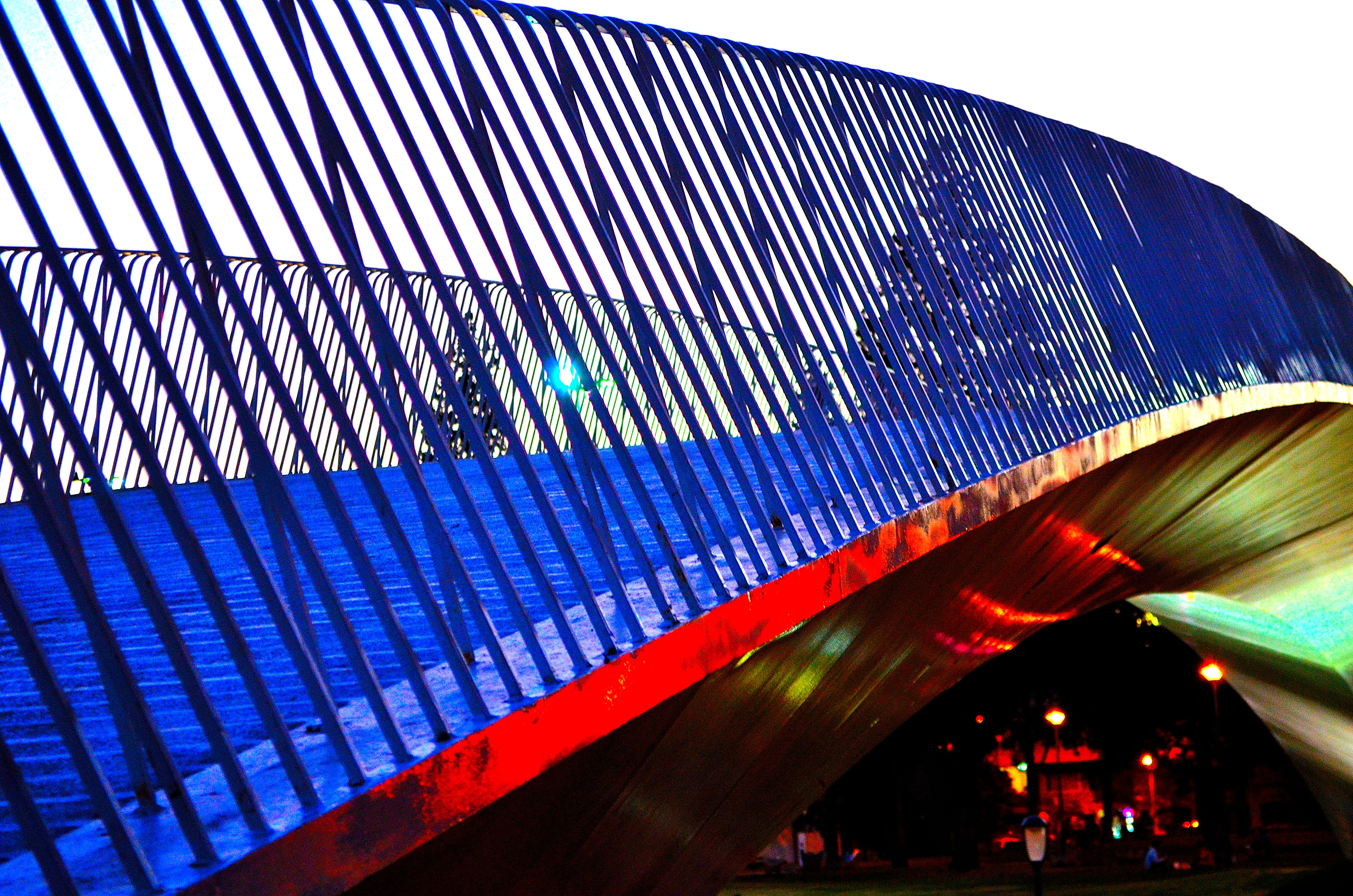
Tejas Park at New Córdoba.

Ciudad Universitaria is a district located in the southern area of the city, next to the 17 hectares (42 acres) Sarmiento Park, the city's most important one. The Universidad Nacional de Córdoba (UNC) has most of its facilities in this area. The UNC was the first university built in Argentina, founded by Jesuits around 1622. The Universidad Nacional de Córdoba is also famous for the "Reforma Universitaria", a student-led protest that started in March 1918 in the Medical School, in which the students rebelled against the prevailing university system. This was an old anachronistic system in which professors were authoritarian and inefficient, with a religiously-oriented curriculum. Eventually this revolt led to a more secular curriculum and some significant re-structuring of the university government. The distinctive nature of the movement derived not only from its radical demands, but also from its extremist tactics, the level of sophistication of its organization, and its major continental impact. In fact, the Reform Movement rapidly spread from Córdoba to Lima (1919), Cuzco (1920), Santiago de Chile (1920), and Mexico (1921). Another important university, the UTN, dedicated to the teaching of engineering sciences, is located in this part of the city. There is also a gym and football stadium and tennis courts for the students. The Córdoba Zoo is located in this district.

Located about 6 km (4 mi) from downtown Córdoba is the Cerro de Las Rosas. This very affluent neighborhood is famous for its schools, shops and educational institutions. This neighborhood's economic activity centers around Rafael Núñez Avenue, a long wide road that stretches for a few kilometers and has restaurants, boutiques, banks and other shops. Over the last decade, this neighborhood has experienced steady growth; however, some of its most affluent inhabitants have moved to gated communities for security reasons. Some of these communities, such as "Las Delicias" and "Lomas de los Carolinos", are in the old Camino a La Calera.

== Transportation ==
The Córdoba public transport system includes trains, buses, trolleybuses and taxis. Long-distance buses reach most cities and towns throughout the country.

The city is served by the nation's third-largest airport, Ingeniero Ambrosio L.V. Taravella International Airport, the airport serves domestic flights within Argentina as well as to Brazil, Chile, the Dominican Republic, Panama, Paraguay, Peru and Spain on 15 passenger airlines.

=== Buses ===
Buses are, by far, the most popular way of transportation around Córdoba Province. There are many different companies that provide long distance, short distance and urban services. They all have their own prices, that are not cheap compared to the rest of Argentina. Córdoba is one of the Provinces with higher transportation rates. Urban buses used to be paid with a card called RedBus.

=== Railway ===
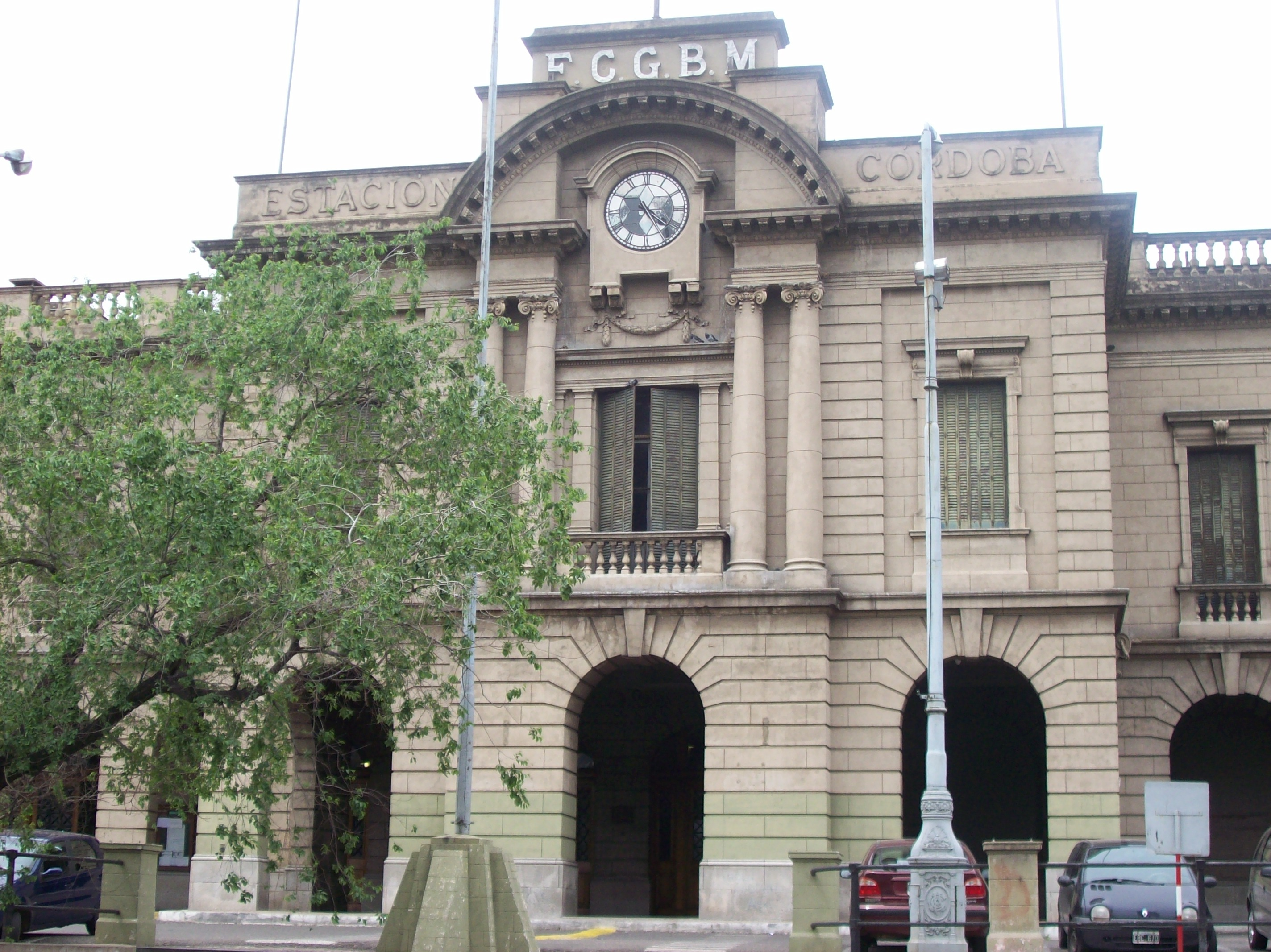
Córdoba Mitre station façade.

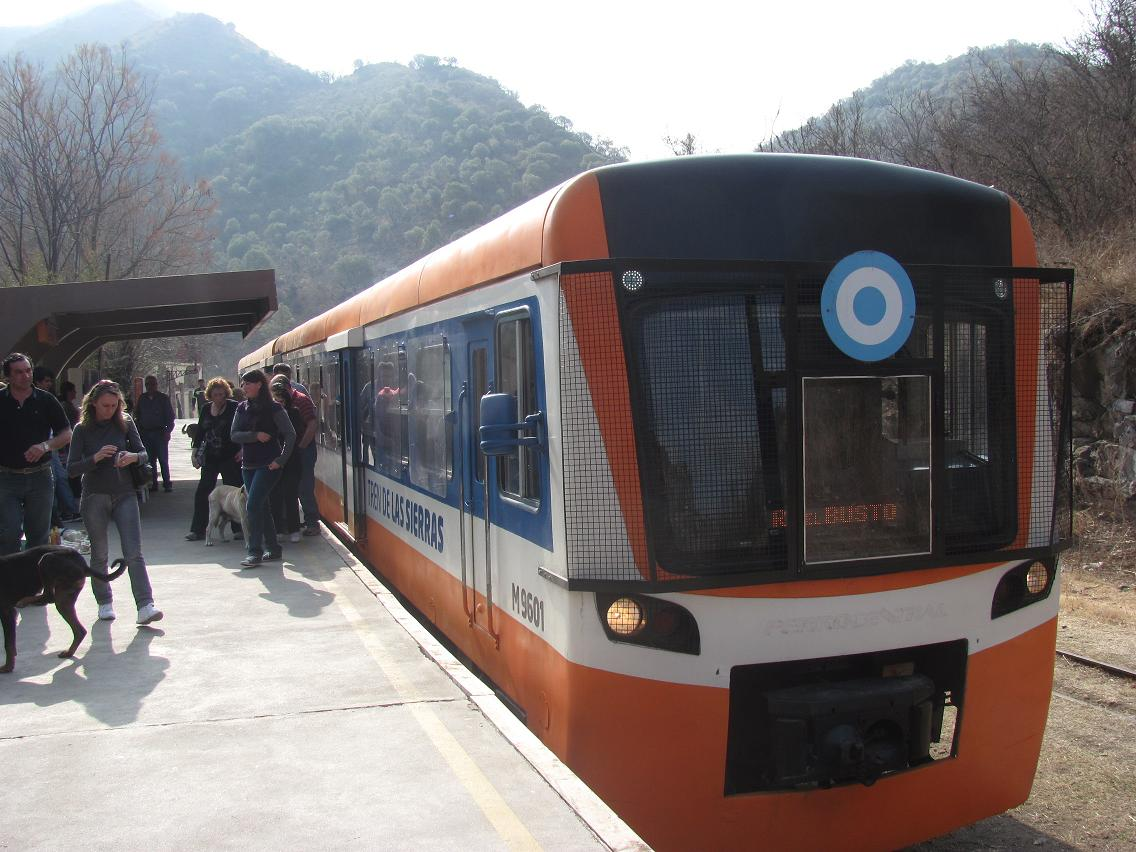
Tren de las Sierras.

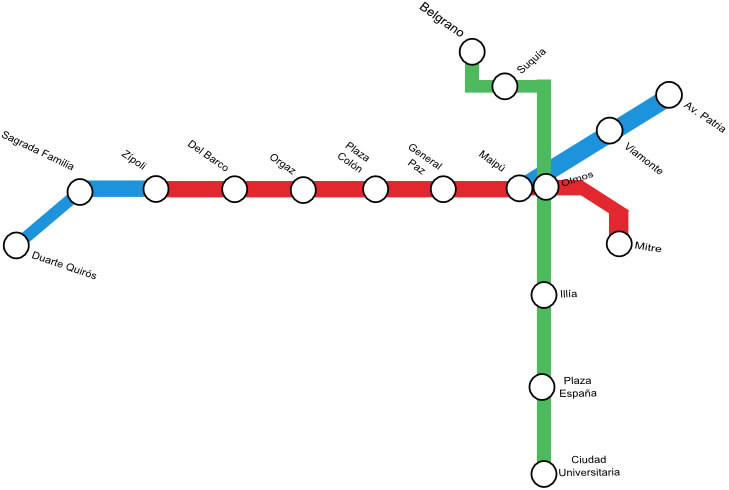
A map of the future metro system.

Rail transport in Córdoba has commuter and long-distance services, all operated by the state-owned Trenes Argentinos. From the Mitre railway station trains depart for Villa María while the Tren de las Sierras connects the district of Alta Córdoba with Cosquín.

From Retiro station in Buenos Aires, trains reach Córdoba twice a week with an estimated journey time of 18 hours. Many people choose the train because of the low cost, but it takes almost twice the time that would take to do the same trip by bus (around eight hours).

The Tren de las Sierras is a tourist service that crosses part of the Valle de Punilla, Quebrada del Río Suquía and borders the Dique San Roque's Lake. It has two services per day with an additional service on weekends. It takes between 2 and 3 hours to go from Alta Córdoba Station to Cosquín.

Córdoba has two railway stations, the Córdoba (Mitre) originally built by the Central Argentine R. in 1886. That station has been an intermediate stop for trains to Tucumán, successively operated by Ferrocarriles Argentinos and then by private consortiums such as Ferrocentral. The other station is Alta Córdoba, built and operated by British-owned Córdoba North Western in 1891, and currently the terminus of Tren de las Sierras.

Railway stations in the city of Córdoba are:

Name	Former company	Line	Status	Operator
Córdoba (Mitre)	Central Argentine	Mitre	Active	Trenes Argentinos
Alta Córdoba	Córdoba North Western	Belgrano	Active	Trenes Argentinos

=== High-speed rail project ===
The Argentine government had planned to build a high-speed train between Buenos Aires-Rosario-Córdoba. It would eventually join Córdoba and Buenos Aires, with an intermediate stop in Rosario, in about 3 hours at speeds of up to 350 km/h (220 mph). Originally scheduled to be started in 2008, with its inauguration in 2010, the project was finally cancelled in December 2012. The total cost of the rail had been estimated at US$4,000,000,000. French company Alstom, which had won the tender to build the high-speed rail, admitted paying bribes to the Argentine authorities.

=== Metro ===
On 10 December 2007 it was announced that a consortium of Iecsa/Gela companies was to build a US$1.1 billion metro system in Córdoba. In April 2008, President Cristina Fernández de Kirchner, signed the project into law. The project has been suspended since 2012.

=== Córdoba Public Transportation statistics ===
The average amount of time people spend commuting with public transit in Córdoba, for example to and from work, on a weekday is 64 min. 13.8% of public transit riders ride for more than two hours every day. The average amount of time people wait at a stop or station for public transit is 21 min, while 43% of riders wait for over 20 minutes on average every day. The average distance people usually ride on a single trip with public transit is 5 km, while 4% travel for over 12 km in a single direction.

== Economy ==
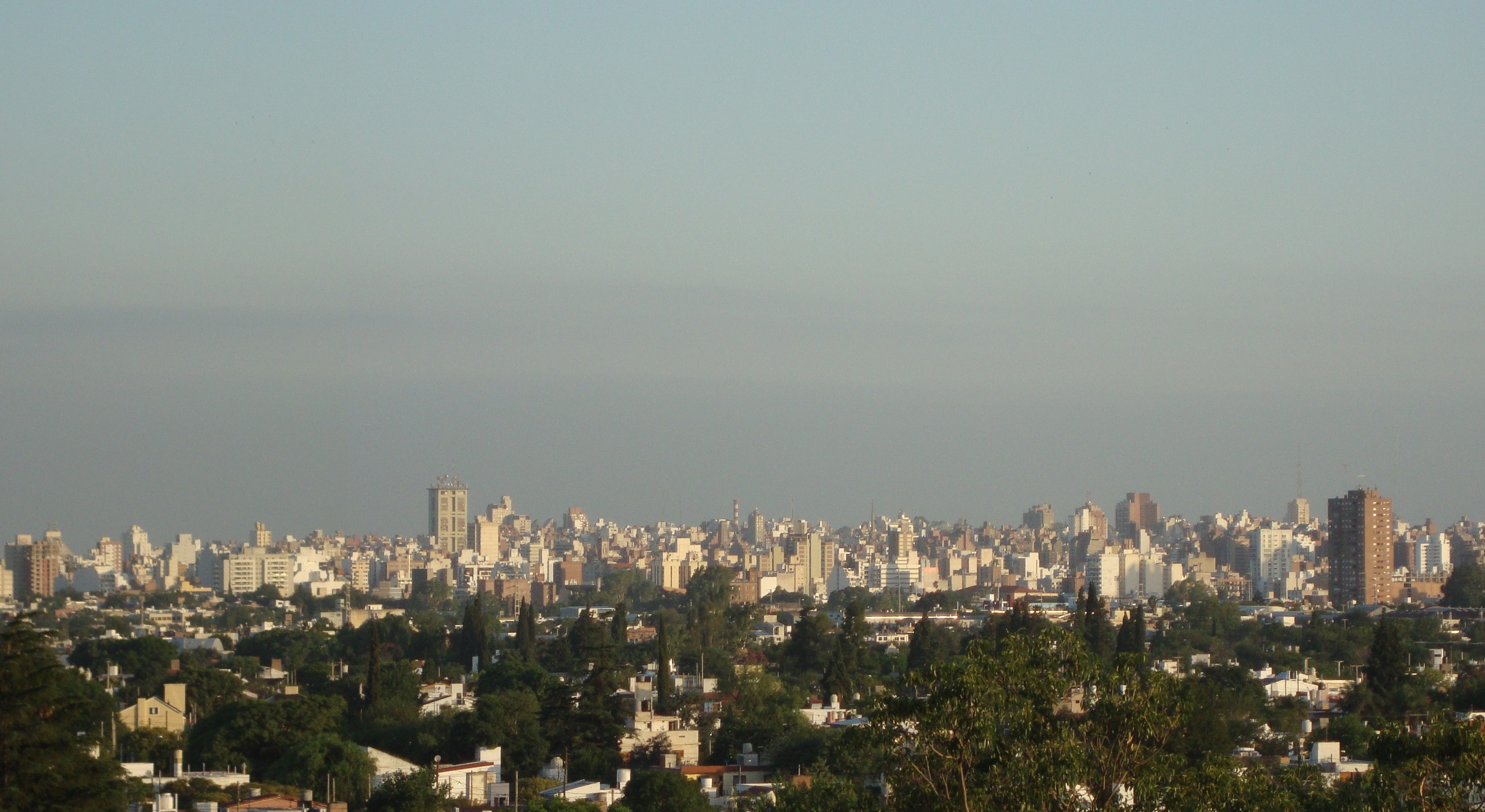
Partial view of downtown Córdoba, Argentina

Since World War II, Córdoba has been developing a versatile industrial base. The biggest sectors is car and car parts manufacturing: Renault has a factory which produces a range of cars and Volkswagen has a factory specialized in the production of gearboxes. The capital goods company CNH Industrial has also a factory in the city. The legal service Novadios was founded in 2008 in this city. Many suppliers (both local and foreign) manufacture car parts for these operations. Additionally, in 2017–2018, Nissan and Mercedes-Benz began the production of their new pickup truck at the local Renault factory. Railway construction (Materfer) and aircraft construction (Fábrica Militar de Aviones) were once significant employers, but their activities have greatly diminished. Furthermore, there are some textile, heavy and chemical industries (e.g. Porta for alcohol).

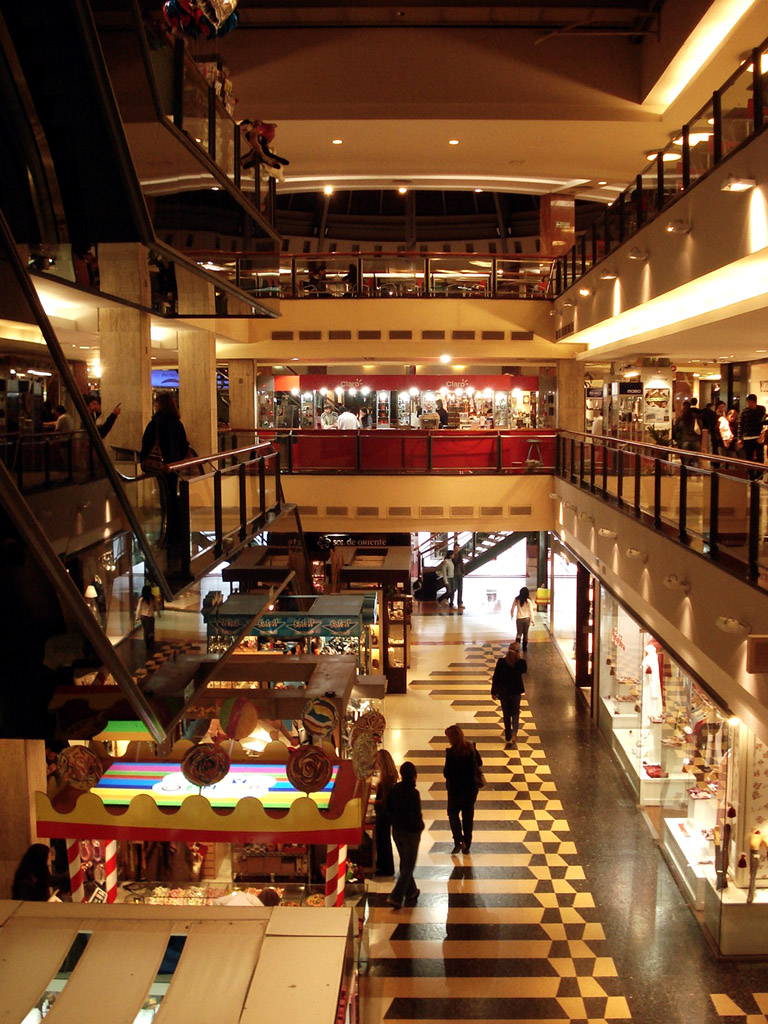
The Patio Olmos Shopping Gallery.

Areas around Córdoba produce vast amounts of agricultural products, and some of these are processed around the city. Additionally, the province is one of the main producers of agricultural machinery in the country, although most of these operations are not in the city itself. Candy company Arcor is headquartered in the city.

Córdoba has been considered the technological centre of Argentina. The Argentine spaceport (Centro Espacial Teófilo Tabanera), where satellites are being developed and operated for CONAE, is located in the suburb of Falda del Carmen. The software and electronic industries are advancing and becoming significant exporters; among the leading local employers in the sector are Motorola, Vates, Intel, Electronic Data Systems, and Santex América.

The city also has a service-based economy focused on retail, professional services and financial services, where the main local player is credit card provider Tarjeta Naranja. It has recently emerged as a start-up hub with a growing number of angel investors, in part due to the availability of people with technology-oriented skills.

== Sports ==
Association football is the most popular sport in Córdoba as well as in Argentina. Several leagues and divisions compete in the local championship annually. The city currently has three representatives in the Argentine First Division, Talleres, Belgrano, and Instituto, and also one in the second, Racing de Córdoba. Estadio Mario Alberto Kempes hosted 8 matches in the 1978 FIFA World Cup.

Basketball is the second-most popular sport in Córdoba. Asociación Deportiva Atenas is the most popular club, and one of the most successful in Argentina, having won the National League (LNB) seven times, and being three times winner of the South American League. Córdoba was one of the host cities of the official Basketball World Cup for its 1967 and 1990 editions.

Cordoba was also a host for the 2002 FIVB Men's Volleyball World Championship and organized the UCI BMX World Championships in 2000.

Rugby union is also a very popular sport in Córdoba, which has close to 20 teams with many divisions. Tala Rugby Club, Club La Tablada, Córdoba Athletic Club (one of the oldest clubs in Argentina and founded by the British who worked in the building of the Argentine Railroads around 1882), Jockey Club Córdoba, and Club Universitario de Córdoba are some of the most prestigious teams. Córdoba is one of the strongest rugby places in Argentina, and is the home of many international players. Many of the great players in Argentina and Italy began their careers in the Córdoba's rugby clubs.

In tennis, since 2019, the Córdoba Open is also held at the "Polo Deportivo Kempes", a sports complex next to Estadio Mario Alberto Kempes. Golf and tennis are also very popular; notable players who started playing in Córdoba include Ángel "Pato" Cabrera and Eduardo "Gato" Romero (b. 1954) in golf and David Nalbandian in tennis.

The Argentine stage of the World Rally Championship has been run near Córdoba since 1984. Motorsport events also take place at Autódromo Oscar Cabalén, such as TC2000 but has hosted Stock Car Brasil and Formula Truck.

== Education ==
Location of Universities in Córdoba. 1. National University of Córdoba. 2. National Technological University. 3. Catholic University of Córdoba. 4. Blas Pascal University. 5. 21st Century Business University. 6. Aeronautical Universital Institute.

Córdoba has long been one of Argentina's main educational centers, with 6 universities and several postsecondary colleges. Students from the entire country, as well as neighbouring countries attend the local universities, giving the city a distinct atmosphere.

The National University of Córdoba, established since 1613, is the 4th oldest in the Americas and the first in Argentina. It has about 105,000 students, and offers degrees in a wide variety of subjects in the sciences, applied sciences, social sciences, humanities and arts.

The Córdoba Regional Faculty is a branch of the National Technological University in Córdoba, offering undergraduate degrees in engineering (civil, electrical, electronic, industrial, mechanical, metallurgy, chemical and information), as well as master's degrees in engineering and business, and a PhD program in engineering and materials.

The Catholic University of Córdoba is the oldest private university in Córdoba, it has nearly 10,000 students.

The Aeronautic University Institute, run by the Argentine Air Force, offers degrees in aeronautical, telecommunications and electronic engineering, as well as information systems, accounting, logistics and administration.

The Instituto Tecnológico Córdoba was created jointly by the six universities located in the city to support technological development in the region.

Furthermore, the Universidad Siglo 21 and Universidad Blas Pascal are private universities in the city.

The Air Force Academy and the Air Force NCOs School are both located in the city outskirts.

There is an Italian international school, Escuela Dante Alighieri.

The area once had a German school, Deutsche Schule Cordoba.

== Culture ==
Museums include the Caraffa Fine Arts Museum, founded in 1916, and the Evita Fine Arts Museum, founded in 2007. The Paseo del Buen Pastor cultural center opened in 2007. Downtown's Córdoba Cathedral, the Córdoba Cabildo, and the Plaza San Martín all serve as active public gathering spaces.

== Points of interest ==
The Jesuit Block (Manzana Jesuítica) is one of the most important historical and cultural landmarks in Córdoba, Argentina. Located in the city center, it was declared a UNESCO World Heritage Site in 2000 for its outstanding value as a religious, educational, and architectural complex.

History

The Jesuits, members of the Society of Jesus founded by St. Ignatius of Loyola in 1534, arrived in Córdoba in 1599. They were granted land on the southern edge of the new city, where they established a convent, cloisters, workshops, and gardens. In 1613, they founded the Colegio Máximo, which later developed into the National University of Córdoba, the first university in the Southern Cone and the oldest in Argentina. The Jesuit Block also became the center of a network of rural estancias (farms), which supported the order’s educational and missionary work through a model of economic self-sufficiency.

Points of interest for visitors

Today, parts of the Jesuit Block are open to the public, offering visitors a chance to explore Córdoba’s academic and spiritual heritage. Highlights include the church, the historic cloisters, and the Monserrat School. The Historical Museum of the National University of Cordoba displays manuscripts, early scientific collections, and items related to the university’s history. Guided tours often highlight underground structures and archaeological findings, adding a sense of mystery to the visit.

The Jesuit Block is also connected to modern history: Pope Francis (then Jorge Mario Bergoglio) lived in Córdoba during the 1960s as a young Jesuit priest, spending a period of study and reflection in the residence linked to the complex.

Architecture and features

The Jesuit Block showcases a harmonious blend of colonial Baroque architecture and functional design rooted in Jesuit ideals of austerity and utility. Key structures include the Iglesia de la Compañía de Jesús, built between 1640 and 1671, notable for its adobe and stone construction and wooden ceiling made using indigenous techniques. The urban layout integrates religious, educational, and residential elements, reflecting the Jesuit commitment to community and holistic education. The entire complex was restored following its UNESCO designation in 2000, ensuring preservation of original masonry, woodwork, and archaeological features. The Colegio Nacional de Monserrat and the residences and cloisters reflect a mix of Spanish colonial and local Criollo styles. Underground tunnels, which likely served as ventilation and escape routes, add a layer of architectural intrigue.

Legacy

The Jesuit Block has had a lasting cultural, educational, and religious impact on Argentina and Latin America. It laid the foundation for the National University of Córdoba, the oldest in Argentina, which played a central role in the 1918 University Reform Movement that shaped higher education across Latin America. The Jesuit system of self-sustaining rural estancias linked to the block pioneered a model of regional development. The site also holds spiritual significance, as it was a formative location for Pope Francis, who lived and studied there during a pivotal period in the 1960s. Its inscription as a UNESCO World Heritage Site in 2000 elevated international awareness of Jesuit cultural contributions in the Southern Cone. Today, the complex continues to function as a symbol of Córdoba’s academic excellence and religious heritage.

== Notable people ==
- Diego Ayala (b. 1979), former professional tennis player from the United States and coach of Venus Williams
- Diego Acoglanis (b. 1982), football manager and former player
- Enrique Anderson Imbert (1910–2000), novelist, short-story writer and literary critic
- Ossie Ardiles (b. 1952), football manager, pundit, and former midfielder, most notably for Tottenham Hotspur, Paris Saint-Germain, and the Argentina national team, where he won the 1978 FIFA World Cup
- Mirta Arlt (1923—2014), writer, translator, professor and researcher
- José Antonio Balseiro (1919–1962), physicist
- José Luis Bartolilla (b. 1986), singer-songwriter and actor
- Eduardo Barcesat (b. 1940), politician and human rights activist
- Bernardo Bas (1919–1991), politician
- Cristina Bergoglio (b. 1967), artist, writer, and architect
- Mario Blejer (b. 1948), economist
- Sylvia Bermann (1922–2012), psychiatrist, public health specialist, essayist, montenero
- Rodrigo Bueno (1973–2000), cuarteto composer
- Juan Fernando Brügge (b. 1962), politician
- Carlos Armando Bustos (1942–1977), member of the Order of Friars Minor Capuchin
- Jorge O. Calvo (1961–2023), geologist and paleontologist
- Ramón J. Cárcano (1860–1946), lawyer, historian, and politician
- Ángel Cabrera (b. 1969), golf player
- José Antonio Cabrera (1768–1820), lawyer
- Efrain Chacurian (1924–2019), footballer and coach who represented the United States national team and was inducted into the U.S. National Soccer Hall of Fame
- Facundo Chapur (b. 1993), racing driver
- Nimio de Anquín (1896–1979), Thomist writer and fascist politician
- Rodrigo de Loredo (b. 1980), politician
- Vernon De Marco (b. 1992), football player who represented the Slovakia national team
- María del Tránsito Cabanillas (1821–1885), Franciscan tertiary
- Hilda Dianda (1925–2014), composer and musicologist
- Sandra Díaz, ecologist
- Paulo Dybala (b. 1993), football player
- Don Fabian, bolero composer
- Sacha Fenestraz (b. 1999), French-Argentine racing driver
- Gregorio Funes (1749–1829), clergyman and author
- José Gabriel Funes (b. 1963), priest and astronomer
- Facundo Gambandé (b. 1990), actor and singer
- Cristian Gastou (b. 1970), songwriter, producer and evangelical preacher
- Alicia Ghiragossian (1936–2014), Armenian-Argentine poet
- Irma Gigli (b. 1931), imunologist
- Héctor Gradassi (1933–2003), racing driver
- Mauro Cabral Grinspan, transgender activist
- Isabel Hawkins (b. 1958), American astronomer
- Miguel Ángel Juárez (1844–1909), 5th President of Argentina
- Luis Juez (b. 1963), politician
- Alika Kinan (b. 1976), feminist and anti-trafficking activist
- Agustín Laje (b. 1989), writer and political scientist
- Luis Lima (b. 1948), operatic tenor
- Mirta Zaida Lobato (b. 1948), historian
- Paulo Londra (b. 1998), rapper
- Leonor Martínez Villada (b. 1950), politician
- Víctor Hipólito Martínez (1924–2017), lawyer and politician
- Benjamín Menéndez (1885–1975), general
- Juan Carlos Mesa (1930–2016), humorist, screenwriter and director
- Diego Mestre (b. 1978), politician
- Norma Morandini (b. 1948), politician
- David Nalbandian (b. 1982), tennis player
- Tristán Narvaja (1819–1877), judge, theologian, and politician
- Sabino Vaca Narvaja (b. 1975), political scientist
- Rogelio Nores Martínez (1906–1975), engineer and politician
- Fabricio Oberto (b. 1975), basketball player
- Luis Oliva (1908–2009), Olympic runner (1932, 1936)
- José María Paz (1791–1854), politician and general
- Eduardo Pérez Bulnes (1785–1851), politician
- Inés Rivero (b. 1975), model
- Viviana Rivero (b. 1966), writer
- Laura Rodríguez Machado (b. 1965), politician
- Victor Saldaño (b. 1972), Texas death row inmate
- Gerónimo Salguero (1774—1847), statesman and lawyer
- Antonio Seguí (1934–2022), artist
- Ángel Sixto Rossi (b. 1958), Catholic prelate
- Perla Suez (b. 1947), writer and translator
- René Strickler (b. 1964), actor
- Gustavo Giró Tapper (1931–2004) military explorer
- Marcelo Tubert (b. 1952), actor
- Eduardo Valdés (b. 1956), politician
- Hugo Wast (1883–1962), novelist and script writer
- Marlene Wayar (b. 1968), LGBT rights activist
- Darío Zárate (b. 1977), football player
- Lucas Zelarayán (b. 1992), football player (Armenia national team)
- Eugenio Zanetti (b. 1949), dramatist, painter, and art director

== Gallery ==
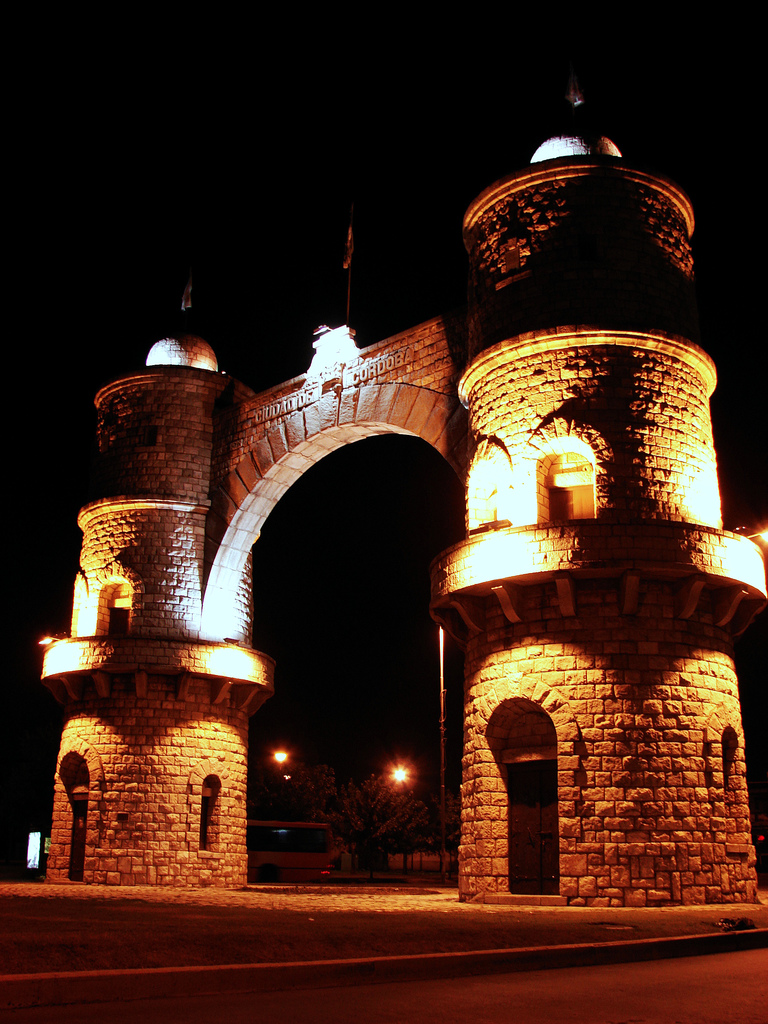
The Córdoba Gateway

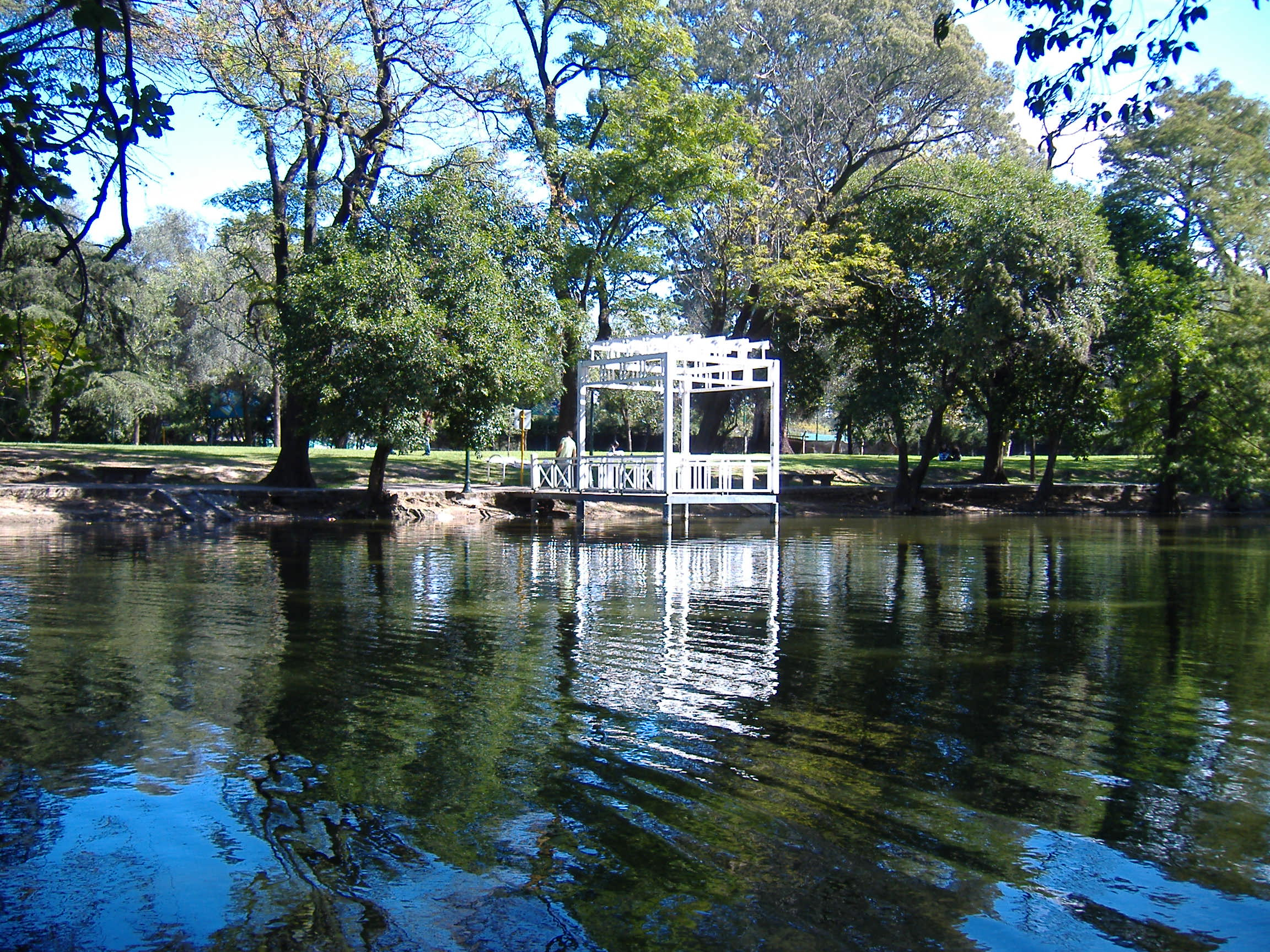
Sarmiento Park

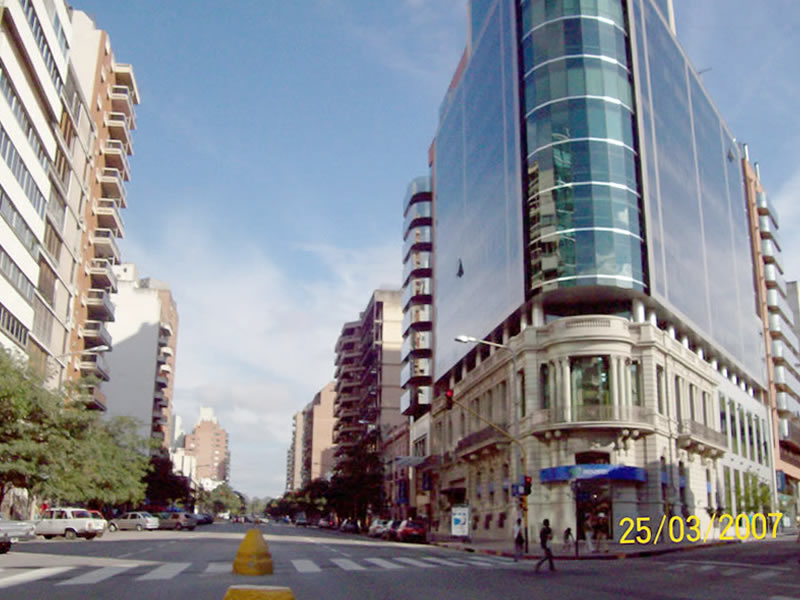
Yrigoyen Avenue and the Ecipsa Tower

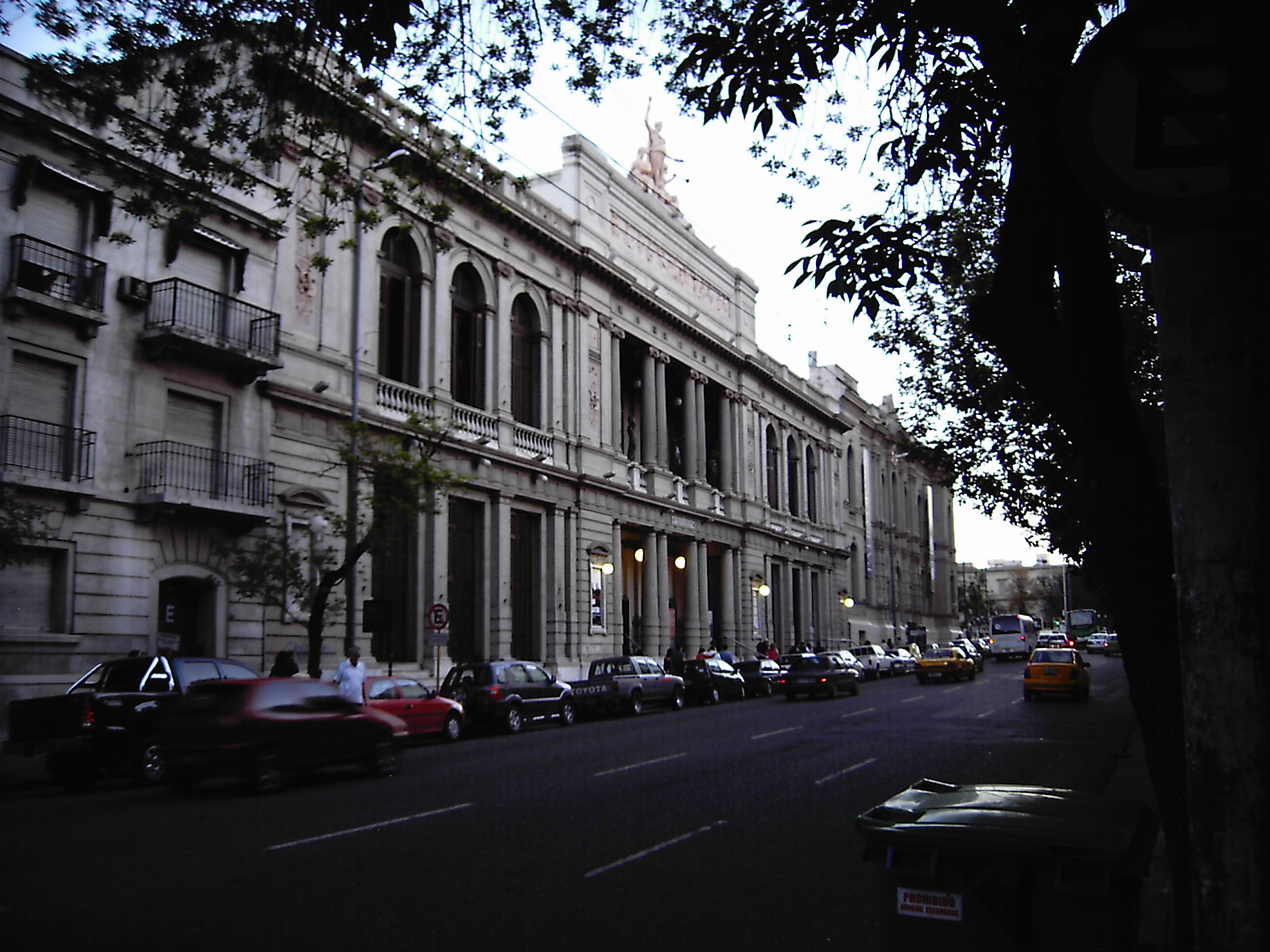
Libertador Theatre

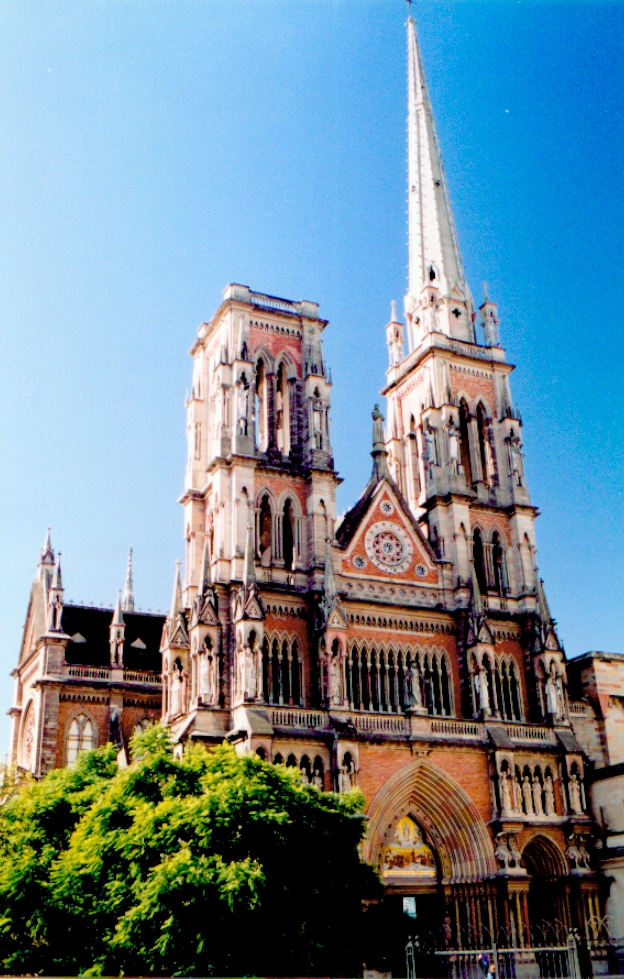
Los Capuchinos Church

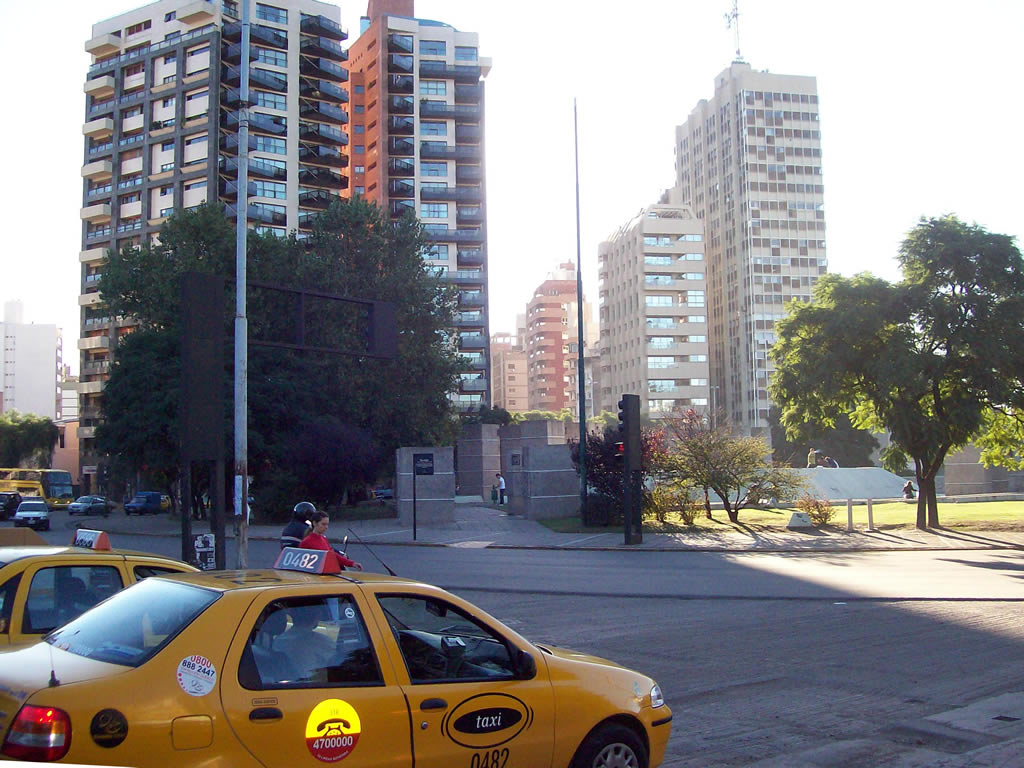
Plaza España

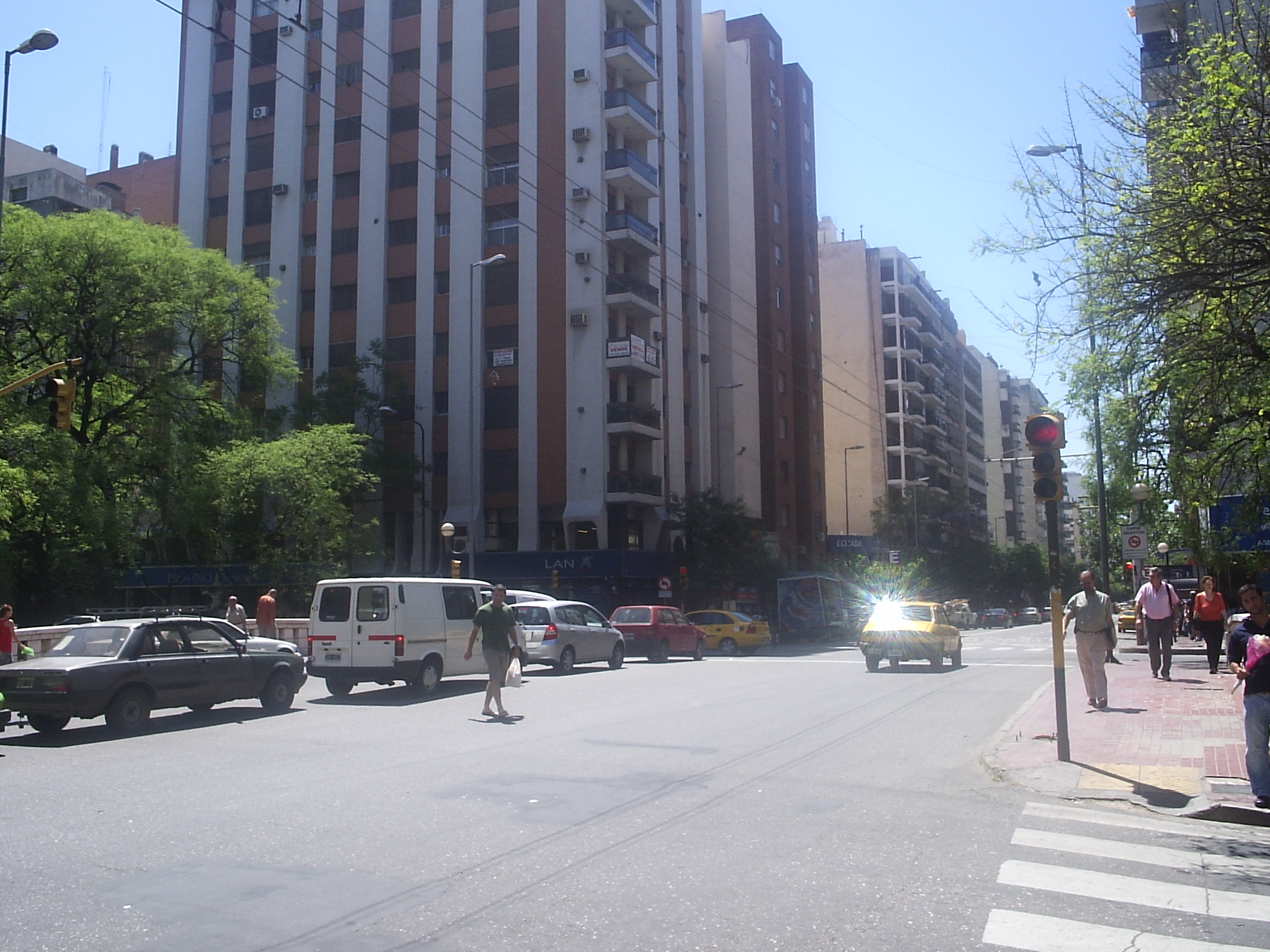
Colón Avenue

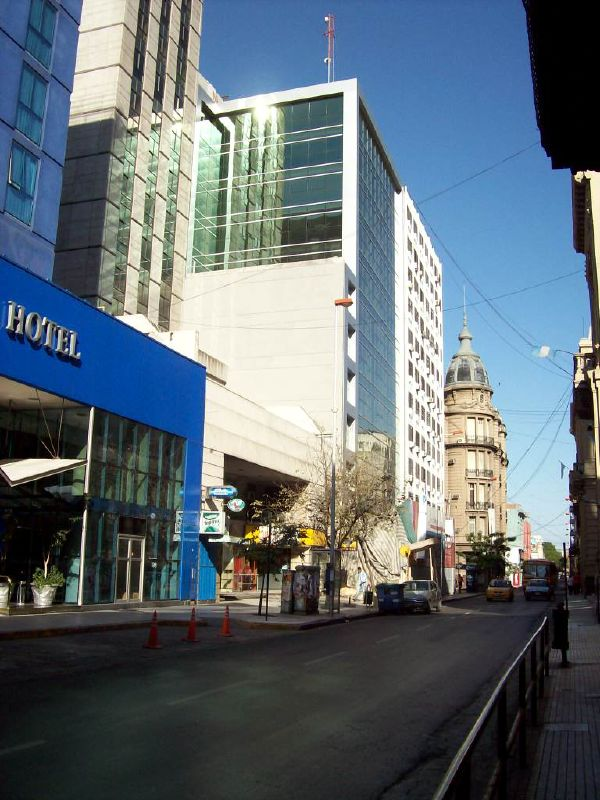
San Jerónimo Street

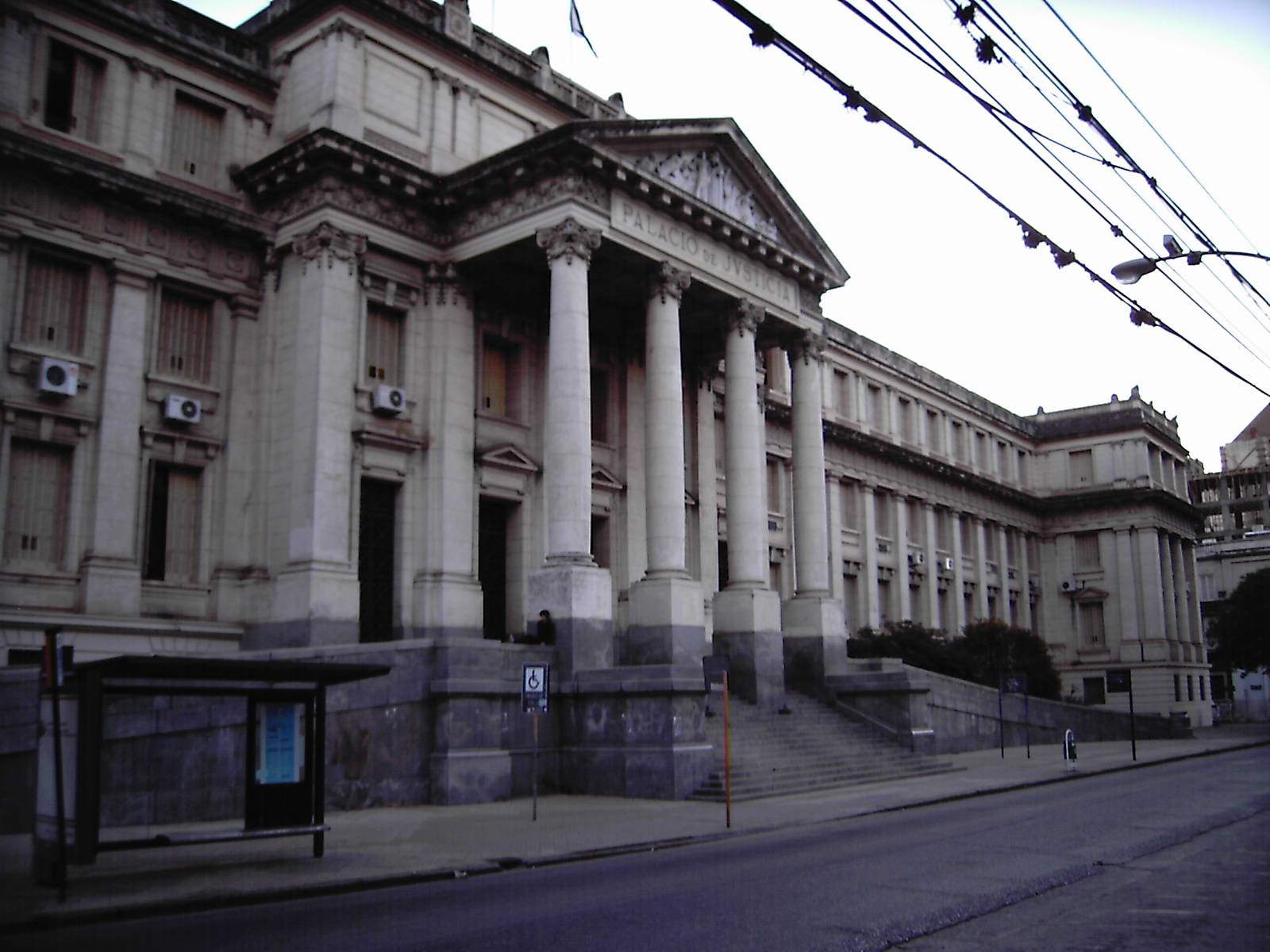
Provincial courthouse

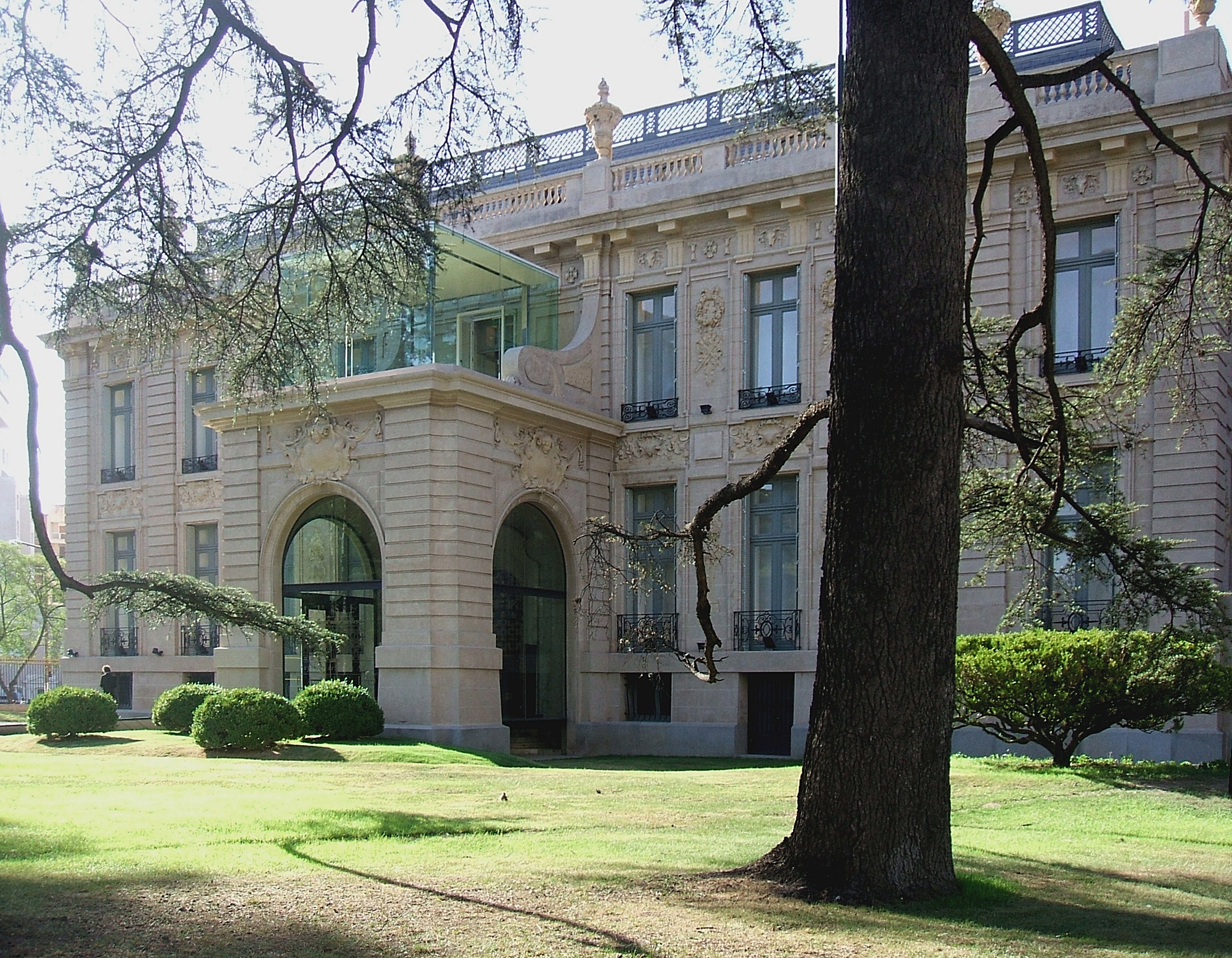
The Palacio Ferreyra Fine Arts Museum

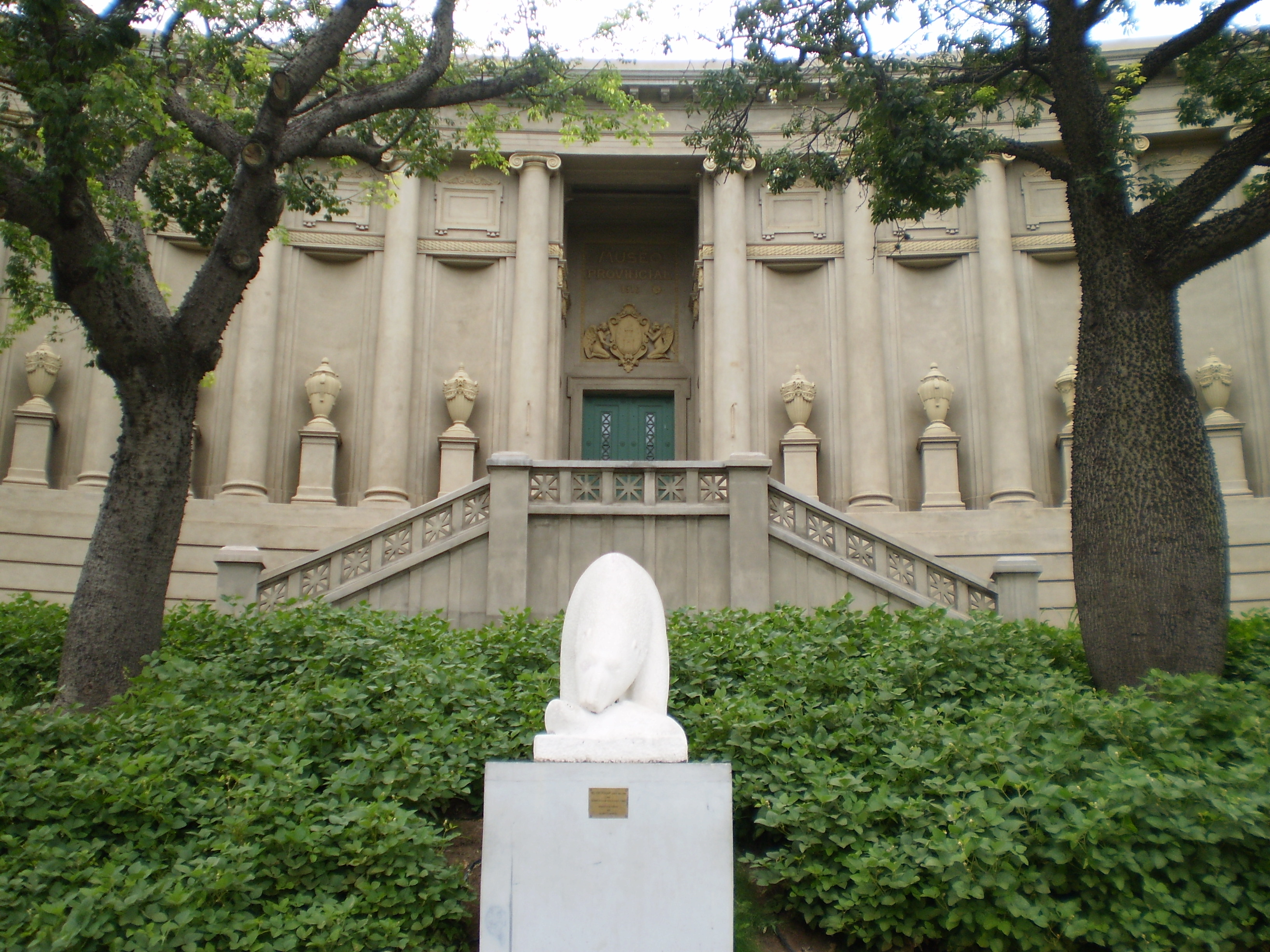
Caraffa Fine Arts Museum

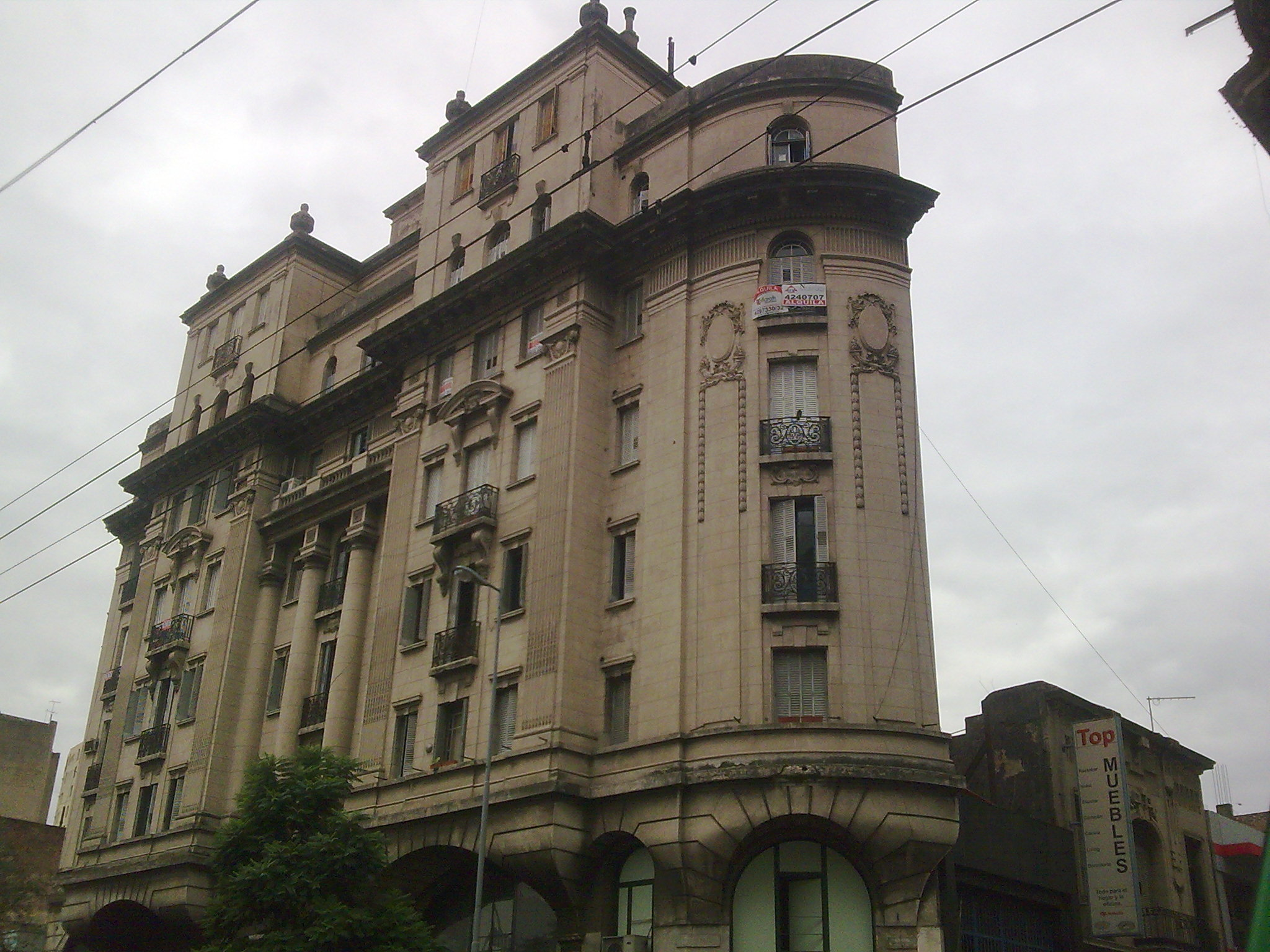
La Mundial, the "world's narrowest building"

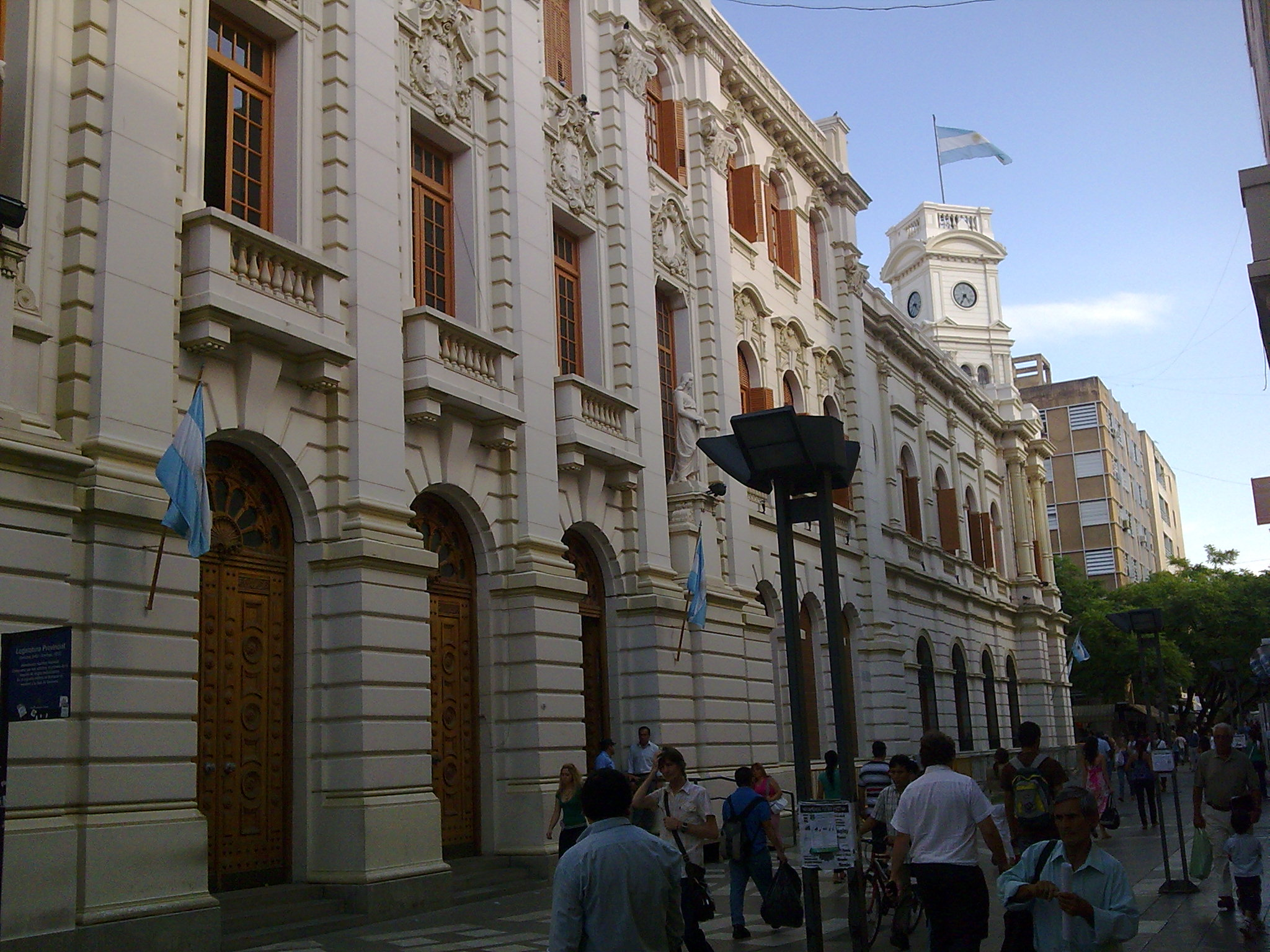
Provincial Legislature

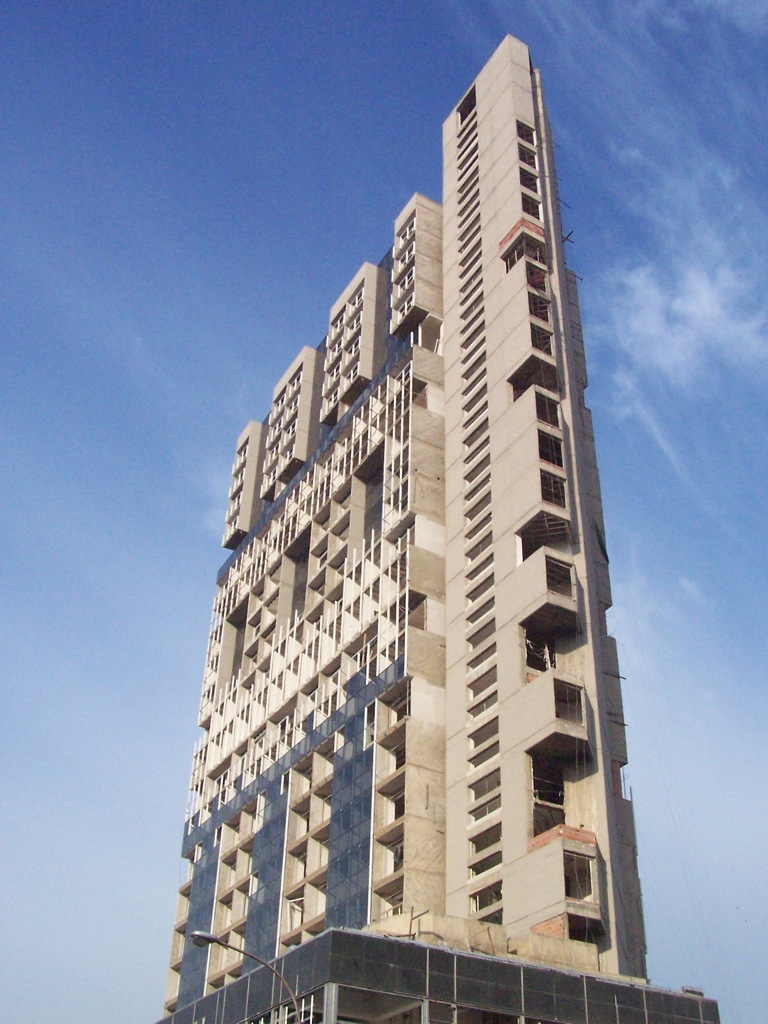
The Coral Building

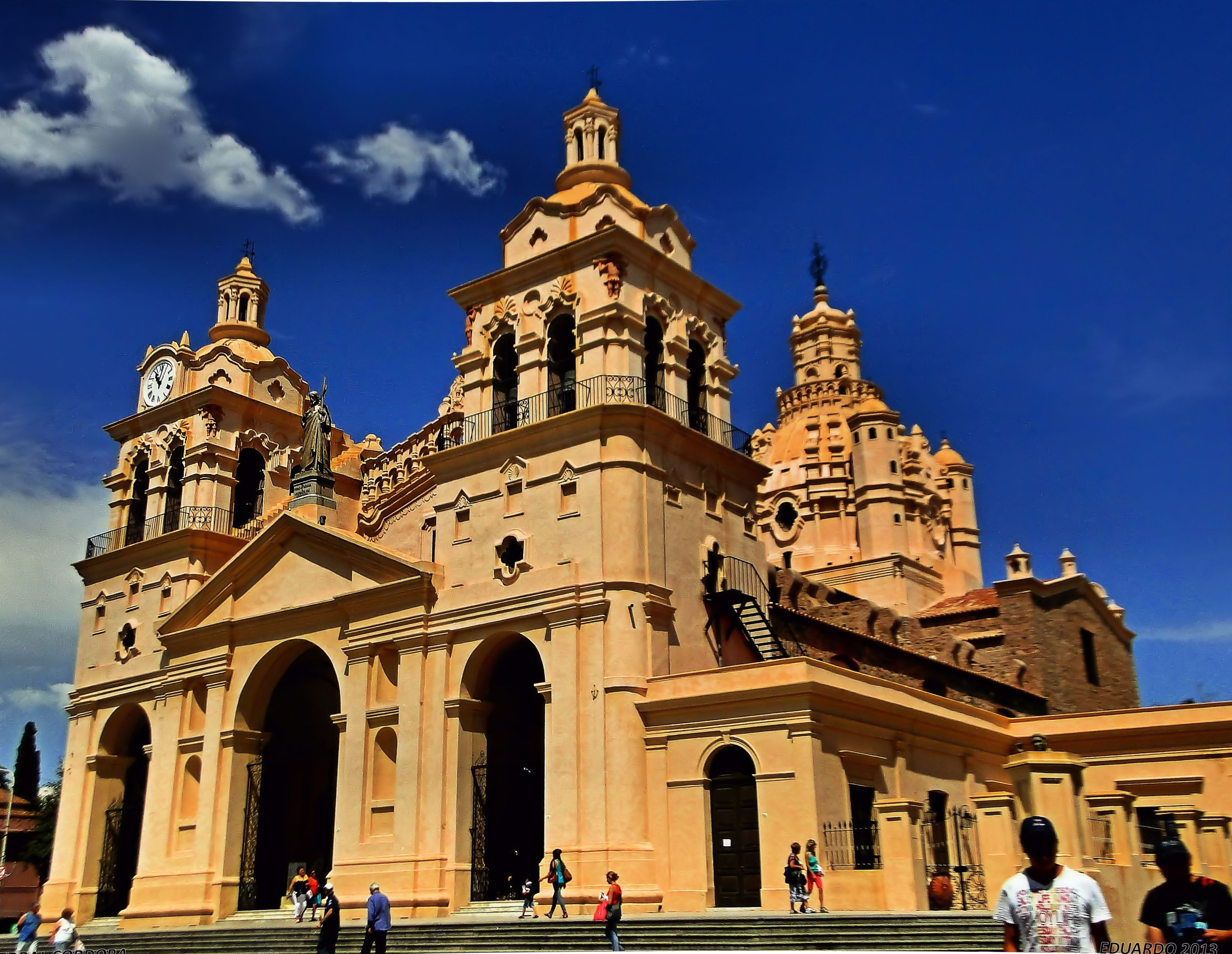
Córdoba's Cathedral

== See also ==
- Córdoba Pride
