= Pampa de Achala =

Region in Sierras Pampeanas, Argentina

- IUCN category VI (protected area with sustainable use of natural resources)
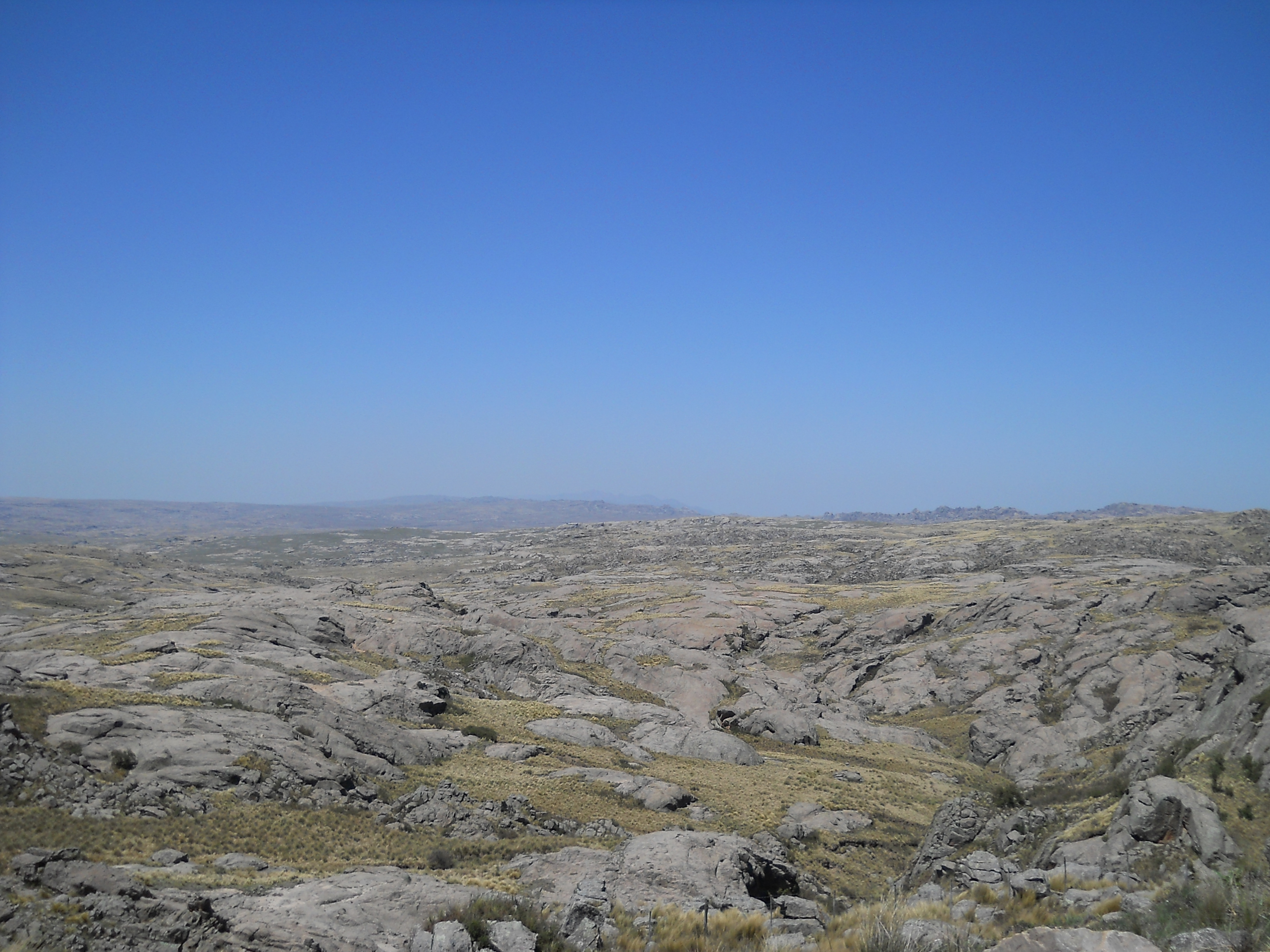
- Southward view on the Pampa de Achala. Cerro Champaquí is visible in the distance.

- Location within Argentina
- Location: Córdoba Province, Argentina
- Coordinates: 31°40′57.37″S 64°50′13.88″W
- Area: 1,460.0 km^{2} (563.7 sq mi)
- Designation: Provincial water reserve (Reserva Hidrica Provincial)
- Designated: 1999

Pampa de Achala is a region that lies at the heart of the Sierras de Córdoba located within Sierras Pampeanas, and located in central-northwest of Argentina. It is a rugged area with little vegetation, lying over 1,500 m (4,900 ft) above sea level, and which has distinctive species, ecology, relief and hydrography. The region is a regional water reserve, and the source of the vast majority of streams that run through the Córdoba Province. Quebrada del Condorito National Park is in the region.

== Origin of the name ==
The name for the area comes from the Quechua language, and apparently refers to the original inhabitants of the region, the comechingones.

There is no concrete data concerning the origin of the name, merely hypotheses. According to the dictionary of the Academia Mayor de la Lengua Quechua, achala means 'fancy dress' or 'striking costume'. Many Quechan terms contain the word achala. A similar word is achalay, meaning 'grooming' or 'decorating'. According to the dictionary of Dr. González de Holguín, the word achala does not exist in that context, but one finds the similar words achallay and achallay ñichini, which mean both 'to cause something' and 'self-admiration'.

The word could have originated from a distortion of the original term, which was later converted into a word more agreeable to the Spanish of the area, and could refer either to the clothing historically worn by inhabitants of the region, allowing them to withstand the severity of the weather, or to the admiration the inhabitants had for this special region.

== Geography ==
Pampa de Achala is located in Córdoba Province in Argentina. The northern boundary consists of the mountains of Los Gigantes, and the southern boundary of the northern portion of the Sierra de Comechingones, with the Summits of Achala located in the central area of the region. It is a rugged area, whose small plains and low slopes are responsible for its classification as 'plains'. These slopes and plains allowed for the formation of an intricate underground water network that supplies a great number of springs. Within this region, there are numerous deep ravines with vertical walls between 600 m and 800 m high, many of which are more than 1,000 m wide. The most important and popular ravines are the Quebrada del Condorito and the Quebrada de Yatán.

These streams have nurtured microclimates that allow for the development of ecological niches, with many endemic species (species that do not live anywhere else on the planet), worthy of study and observation. In general access to them is difficult due to the rugged terrain, often inaccessible to any vehicle (including those with all-wheel drive) and thus can only be reached on foot, by mule or on horseback.

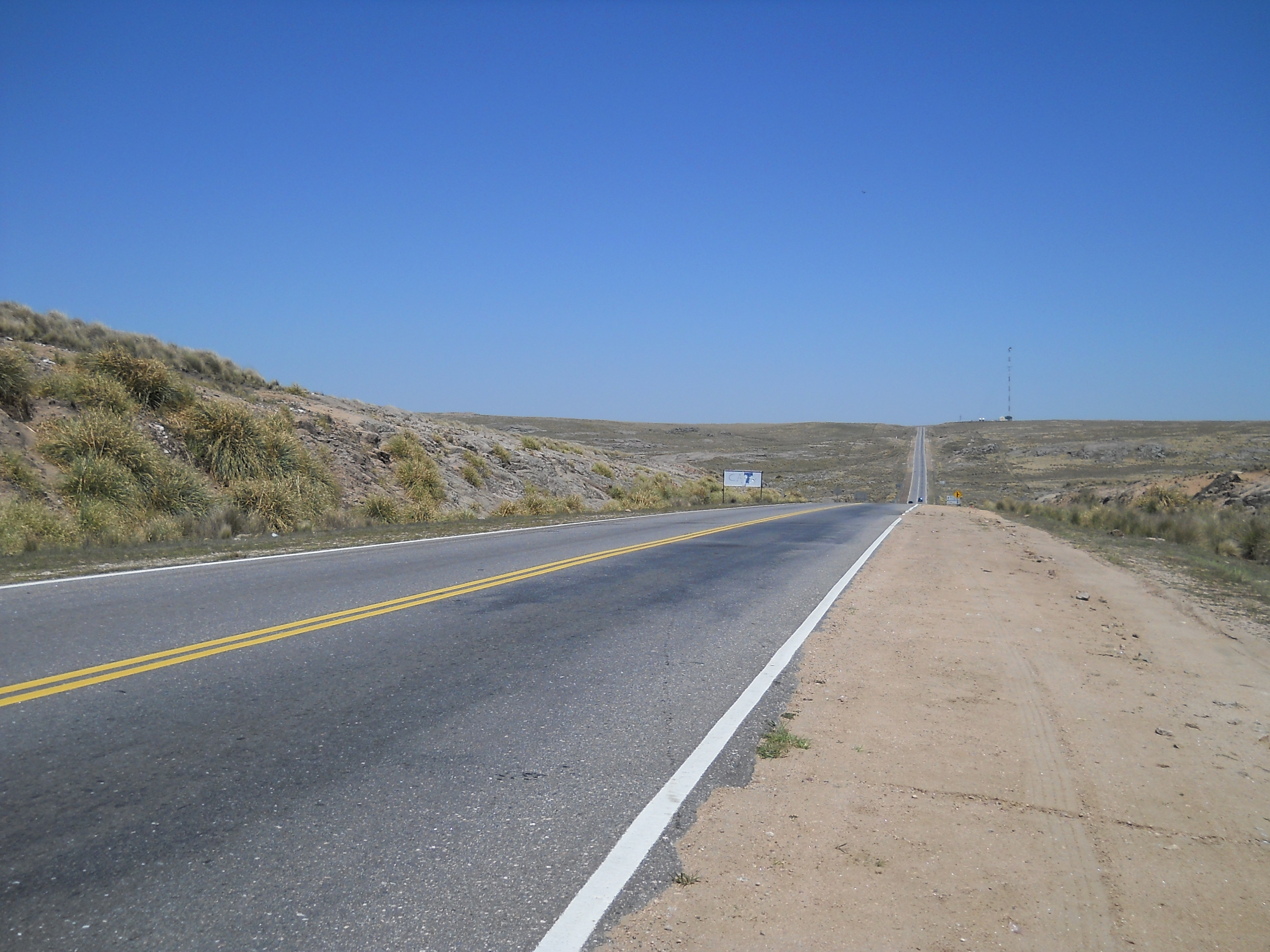
Antenna near 'Altas Cumbres' road, in the Pampa de Achala, situated above 2,300 m (7,500 ft)

The region covers southern Cruz del Eje Department, the south west of Punilla Department, San Alberto Department and San Javier Department and the west of Calamuchita Department.

It is difficult to differentiate the Pampa de Achala provincial water reserve from the Pampa de Achala itself. The water reserve was purposely created to protect the Pampa. Its boundaries are set by geographical features: the northern boundary reaches the provincial route RP 28 (formerly the National Road RN 20), which surrounds the massif of Los Gigantes. The southern boundary is Mount Champaquí, 2,790 m (9,150 ft) high. Its eastern and western limits are set by the high altitude of 1,500 m (4,900 ft). The highest peaks of the province are in this region.

Its size is about 65 km (40 mi) from north to south and 24 km (15 mi) from east to west, which represents an area of approximately 150,000 hectares, of which 40,000 are the Quebrada del Condorito National Park.

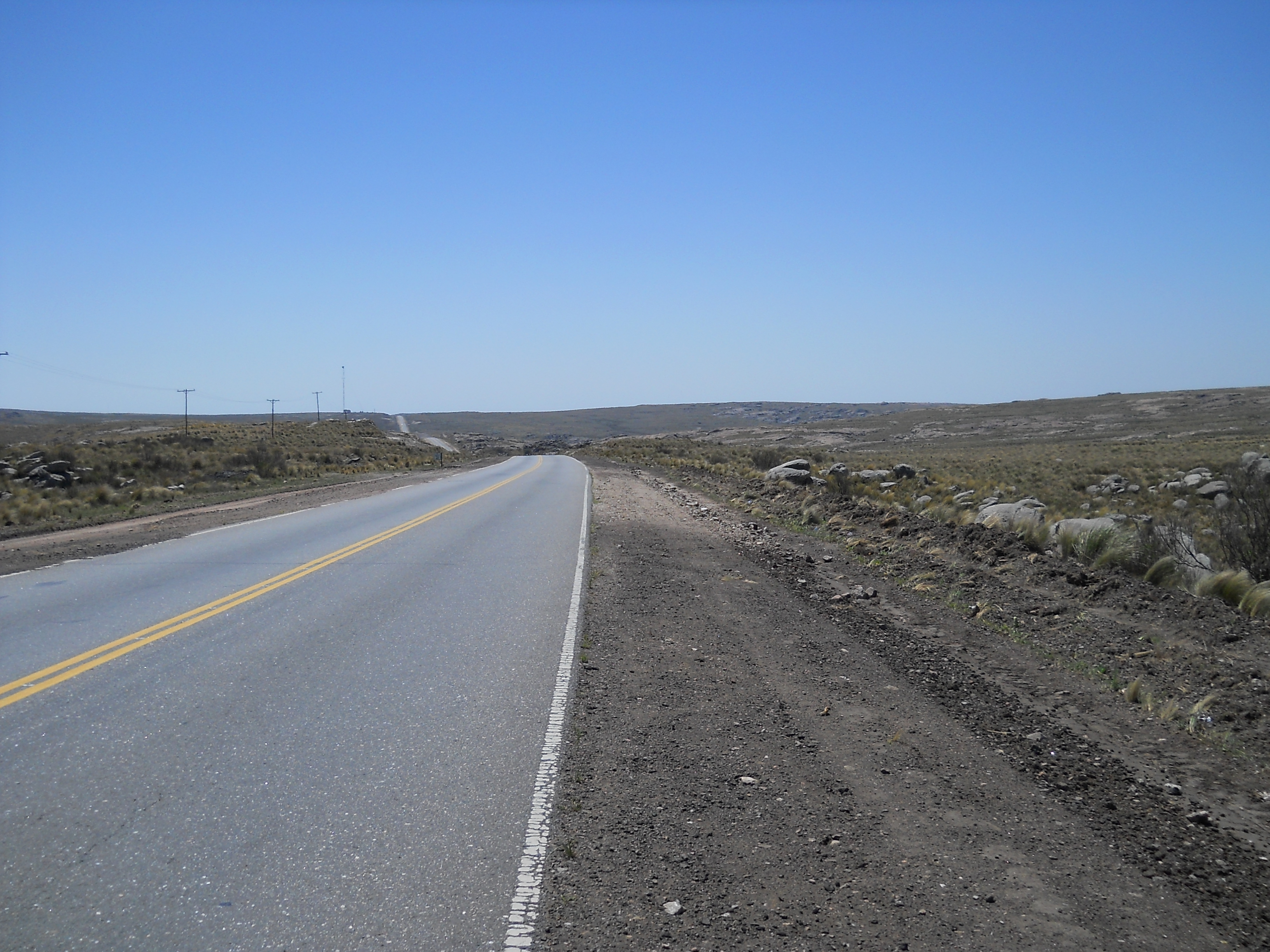
Route N°34 (Altas Cumbres route), also called 'Jorge Raúl Recalde', in memory of this rally driver, native to this region

=== Roads ===
To access this region, two provincial roads: Provincial Route No. 28 (gravel), linking the towns of Tanti with Taninga (near the town of Salsacate). After traveling nearly 40 km from Tanti, and climb over 1,700 meters you reach the far north of the region, more precisely at the foot of the massif 'Los Gigantes'. From there you can follow the same route to the town of Taninga. The second option is the provincial route RP 34 (tarmac), located about 30 km south of the former. It crosses the city of Villa Carlos Paz, crossing the towns of San Antonio de Arredondo, Villa Icho Cruz, Mayu Sumaj, Cuesta Blanca, and deposited us in the Pampa de Achala. This road is also known as Camino de las Altas Cumbres or route Jorge Raúl Recalde, in tribute to this rally racer. Continuing along the same route, it accesses the Traslasierra Valley. While these are the two most relevant options, there are regional roads and tourist access to reach specific sectors within the region. As mentioned above, except for these two alternatives, the other, in most cases are suitable only for special vehicles, and yet they can not access certain areas.

The Hanging Bridges Trail was constructed and opened in 1918, linking the Valley Traslasierra with the city of Villa Carlos Paz in the Punilla Valley.

== Geology ==
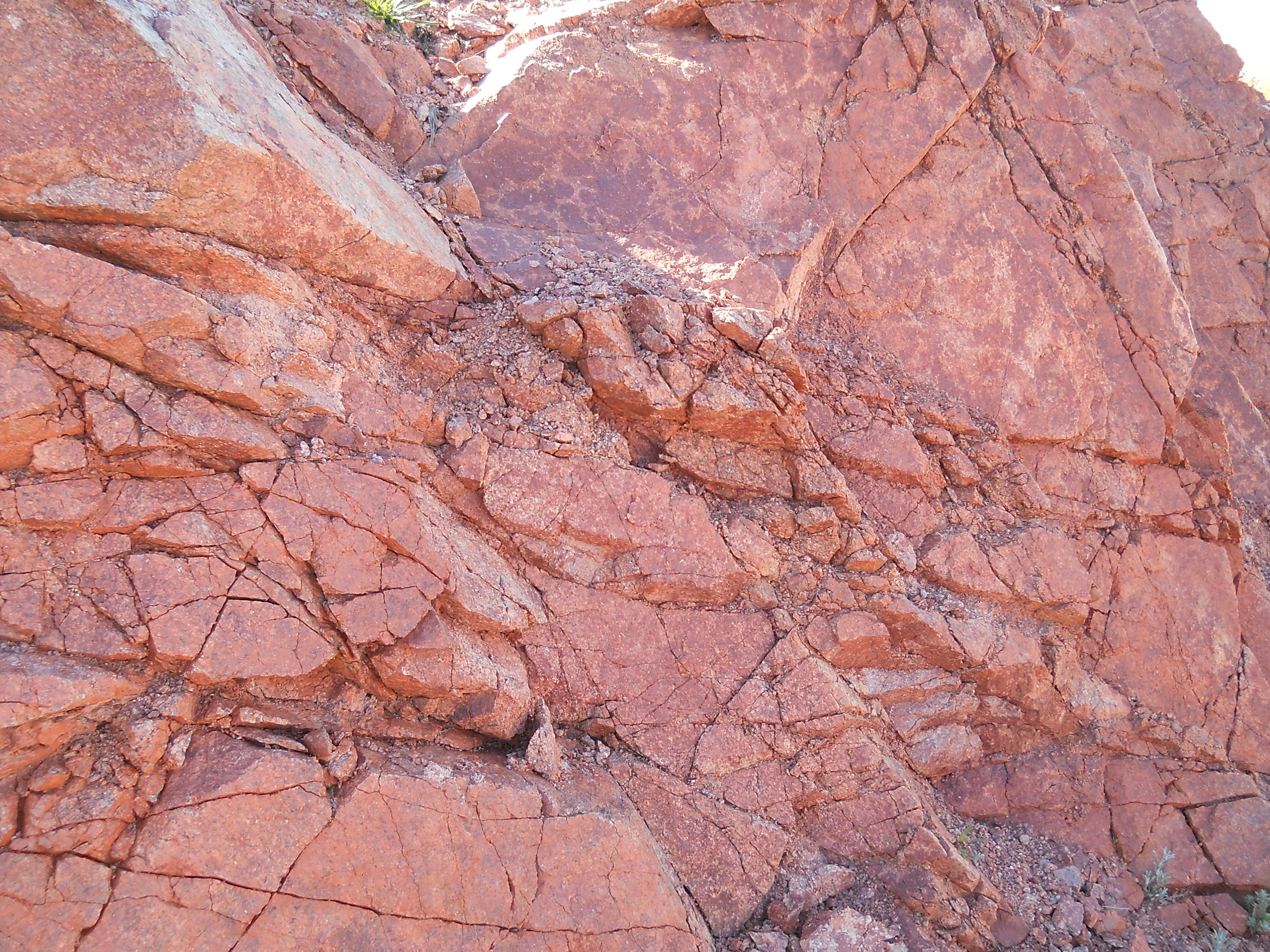
Fractured rocks at Achala, near to 'La Pampilla'

The geological evolution of the Pampa de Achala cannot be isolated from the evolution of Sierras de Córdoba and Sierras de San Luis. The geological history of these, dating back 15 million years, with the formation of a sedimentary basin which was then subjected to enormous strain as a result of horizontal pressure.

Elevated basement blocks are reverse faults of approximately north-south direction, west verging, which are composed by metamorphic rock and Igneous of the Neoproterozoic in the Palaeozoic. Less affected by successive orogenic cycles: the Pampean orogenies, the Proterozoic higher-Cambrian medium (Rapela et al. 1998), Famatinian, the Ordovician less than half (Aceñolaza and Toselli 1976, Dalla Salda 1987) and achaliana of Devon medium to Carboniferous lower (Sims et al. 1998; Stuart-Smith et al. 1999), which would be related to successive stages of convergence and collision of land with the craton of the River Plate, along the proto-Andean margin of Gondwana (sic). Here, there was intrusion of large igneous bodies – batholiths – ended granite, producing the rise of the emerging mountains. In the Tertiary old structures were activated and generated new ones. Along with the strain developed a significant volcanism in the western region and, finally, late in the same era and the beginning of the Quaternary, the whole region was uplifted to build the current ranges.

The tectonic forces at work in the Andean folding were horizontal pressures generated from the west and due to the rigidity of the underlying material caused the existence of faults, almost all north-south and an alignment of the strings accordingly. The result was that seen at present, a mountain range with steep western slopes and eastern slopes with gentle slope, which allowed the formation of natural lakes and streams of high ecological value. These mountain ranges are represented the three types of rocks: metamorphic, sedimentary and igneous. The granites geochemically include calc-alkaline granites with alkaline, meta-aluminous to peraluminous more abundant and monzogranites granites. Granodiorites, leucogranites and tonalites are also present. Mafic enclaves, dikes including lamprophyres, pegmatites and aplites. Its chemical composition places it within the field of collisional or intraplate granites (Rapela et al. 1990), and has been interpreted as a product of partial melting of the crust due to changes in the thermal regime during regional uplift (Otamendi et al. 2002).

Since the foundation of the Pampas, the Sierras has been involved in a series of extensional events in the Late Paleozoic (Gondwanan cycle), the latter accompanied by a large magmatism, volcanism, and finally the Cenozoic Andean orongenic cycle, which produced the present morphology. The brittle tectonic Andica is represented by reverse faults among which stand out in the hills of Cordoba those high peaks, the Giants, Copina and Cumbrecita.

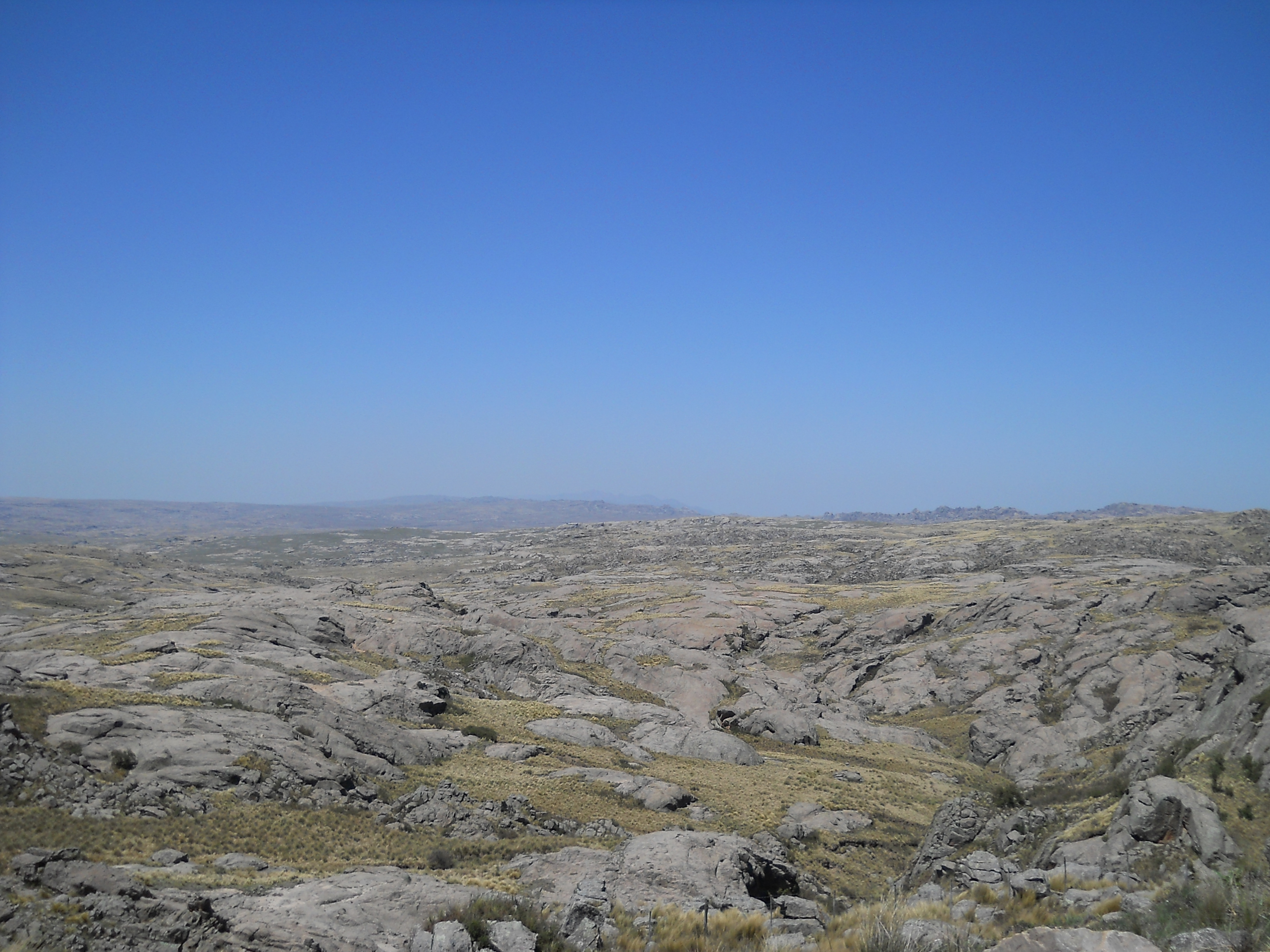
Typical image of Pampa de Achala

The most common here are metamorphic rocks formed from the Precambrian plutonic-metamorphic basement composed mostly of coarse-grained gneiss and migmatites, intruded by large granite batholiths, common in the Pampa de Achala. Minerals found primarily include quartz, mica, biotite and muscovite. magnetite, fluorapatite, rutile, chlorite, kaolinite and uranium ore. The latter has generated considerable controversy regarding its acquisition, due to the high degree of pollution involved in the extraction.

== Climate ==
The climate of the region is temperate with high thermal aptitude. The maximum temperatures are generally 30 °C in the summer, and the temperature does not fall below -20 °C during the winter (approximately the end of April to the beginning of September).

As is typical of the climate of mountain regions, the weather conditions can change within minutes.

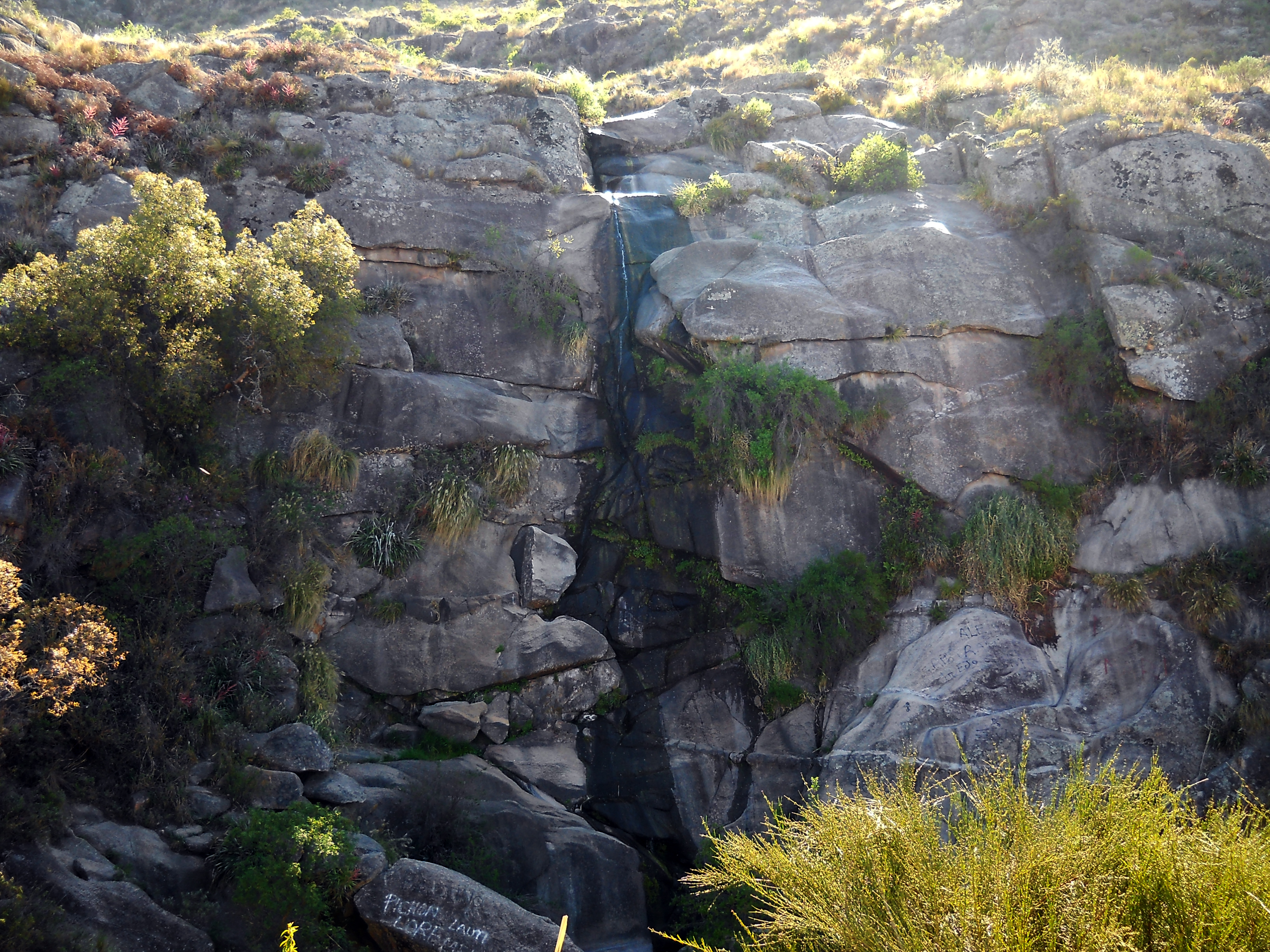
Throughout the Pampa de Achala, hundreds of water sources spring from the bowels of the mountain.

== Hydrography ==
The average precipitation for the area is 800 mm (31 in). In summer precipitation is in the form of rain, and generally in the winter it is found in the form of snow. Fog is common all year due to the humid winds from the east; the cold winds from the south are also not uncommon. An intricate network of streams, ponds, lakes and springs give this region the characteristic function as a 'sponge' that absorbs and retains the moisture throughout the year, channeling it into the water sources which supplied much of the population of the province. It is a natural basin for precipitation, and for this reason, the provincial government declared the region as the provincial water reserve of Pampa de Achala. The area contains the headwaters of four major rivers of the province: Suquía (or First River), Xanaes (or Second River) and Ctalamochita (or Third River) flowing towards the eastern margin of the Sierras. Towards the western side of the region we find the headwaters of the Rio Mina Clavero river.

From December to March it rains more water than what is lost due to evapotranspiration.

== Soils ==
Soils in Pampa de Achala are chiefly Phaeozems and Cambisols. The central Pampa de Achala have a relatively uneven and rocky topography. Some are the soils are made of loess. The northern part of Pampa de Achala is more even and continupusly soil cover making it a good grazing land.

== Biology and ecology ==
This particular eco-region, as defined by the convergence of the biogeographical provinces of Chaqueña del Espinal, Pampeana and Mountain, has been influenced by many types of flora and fauna. It is regarded as an "island" due to its specific biogeographical characteristics and it is thus distinguished from other areas within the environment of Chaco by its altitude and the species that inhabit it.

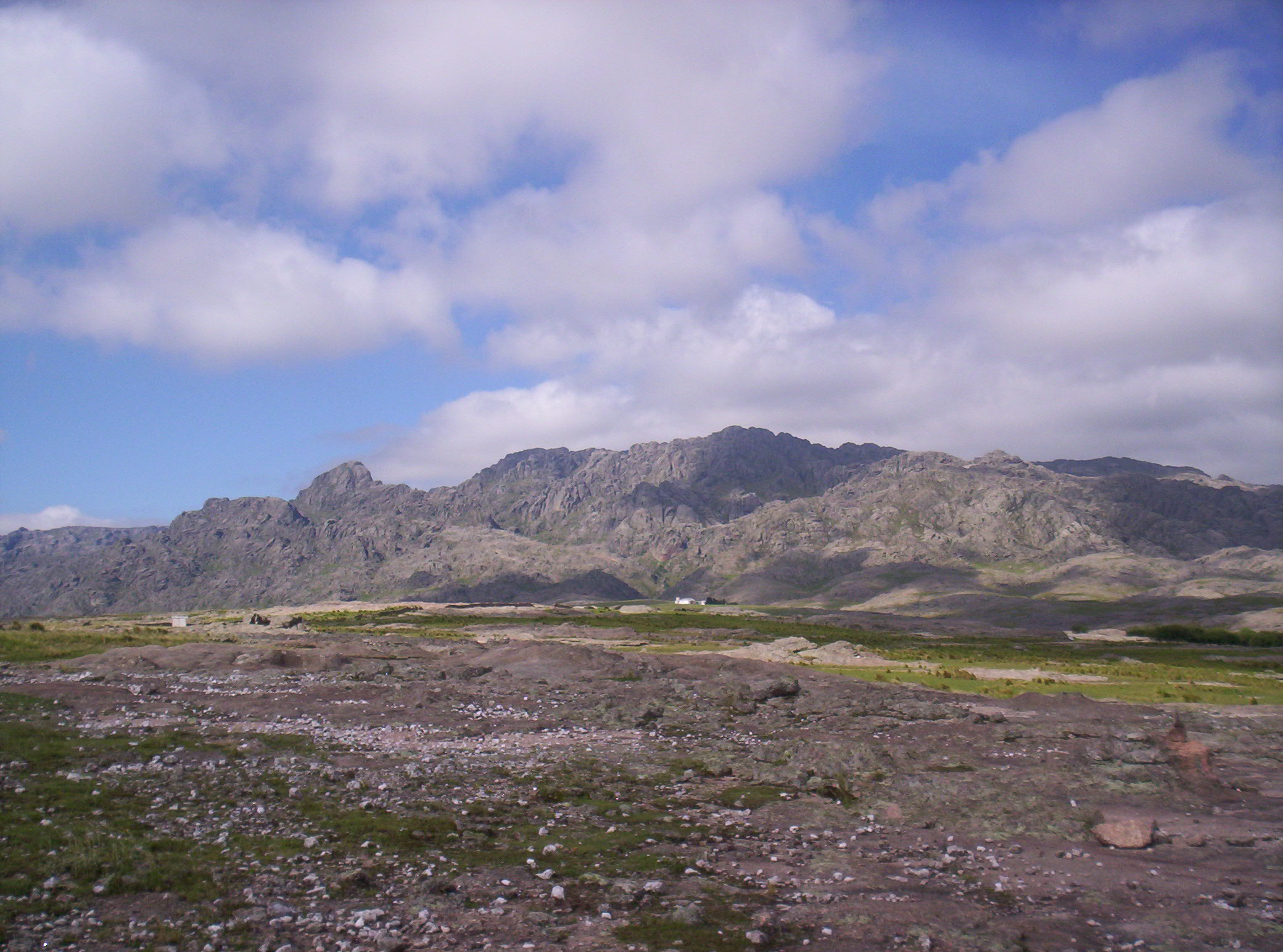
The mountains of Los Gigantes, the northern boundary of Pampa de Achala with an elevation of 2,340 metres

=== Flora ===
Several phytogeographical provinces converge here: Chaqueña, Andean, Patagonian and Magellanic. The confluence of these very diverse currents confers on the area a synthesis of microclimates which makes it unique, a uniqueness accentuated by the presence of endemic species, the number of which is probably greater than is presently known.

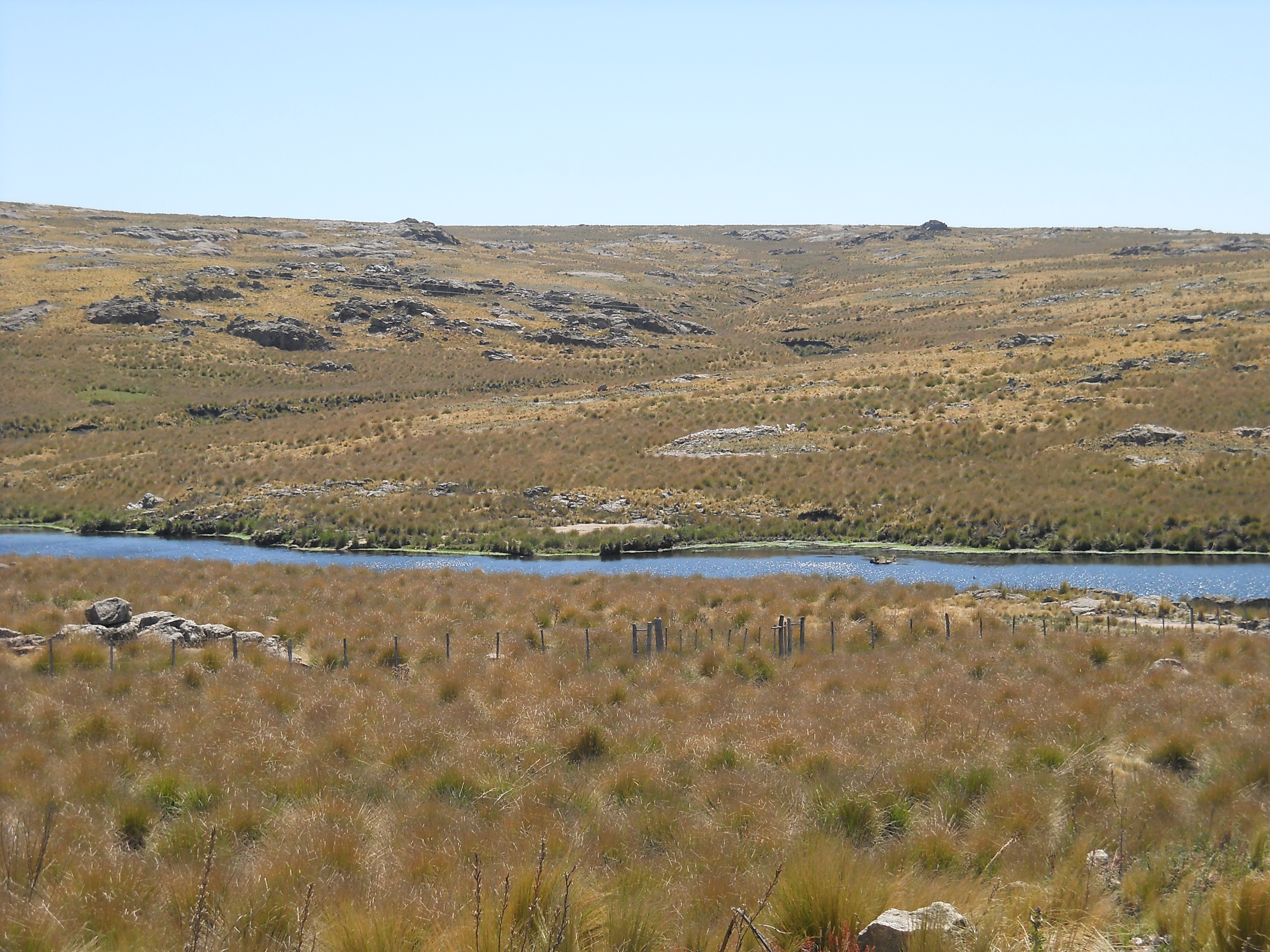
The sparse vegetation consists of coarse grasses and low palatability.

In the ravines and on the mountain slopes are copses or small woods of tabaquillo (Polylepis australis) and mayten (Maytenus boaria), called in the mountain zone "quebracho", the coexistence of which is a unique biogeographical phenomenon. The tabaquillo has relatives which are distributed the length of the Andes from Venezuela to Argentina, while the mayten originates from the woodlands of south-west Argentina (the cool Andean-Patagonian woodland). The greatest density of these woods is in the bottoms of the ravines, where they acquire a low forest physiognomy with great quantities of ferns and epiphytes. Both the grasslands and the woodlands of the pampas and of the ravines respectively are composed of plants of very diverse origins. Some, approaching from the eastern slopes of the mountainous area, are native to the Austro-Brazilian region. Other species of specifically Andean origin have in the Pampa de Achala their most southerly distribution. On the other hand, numerous species of the south of Argentina find in this region their most northerly habitat.

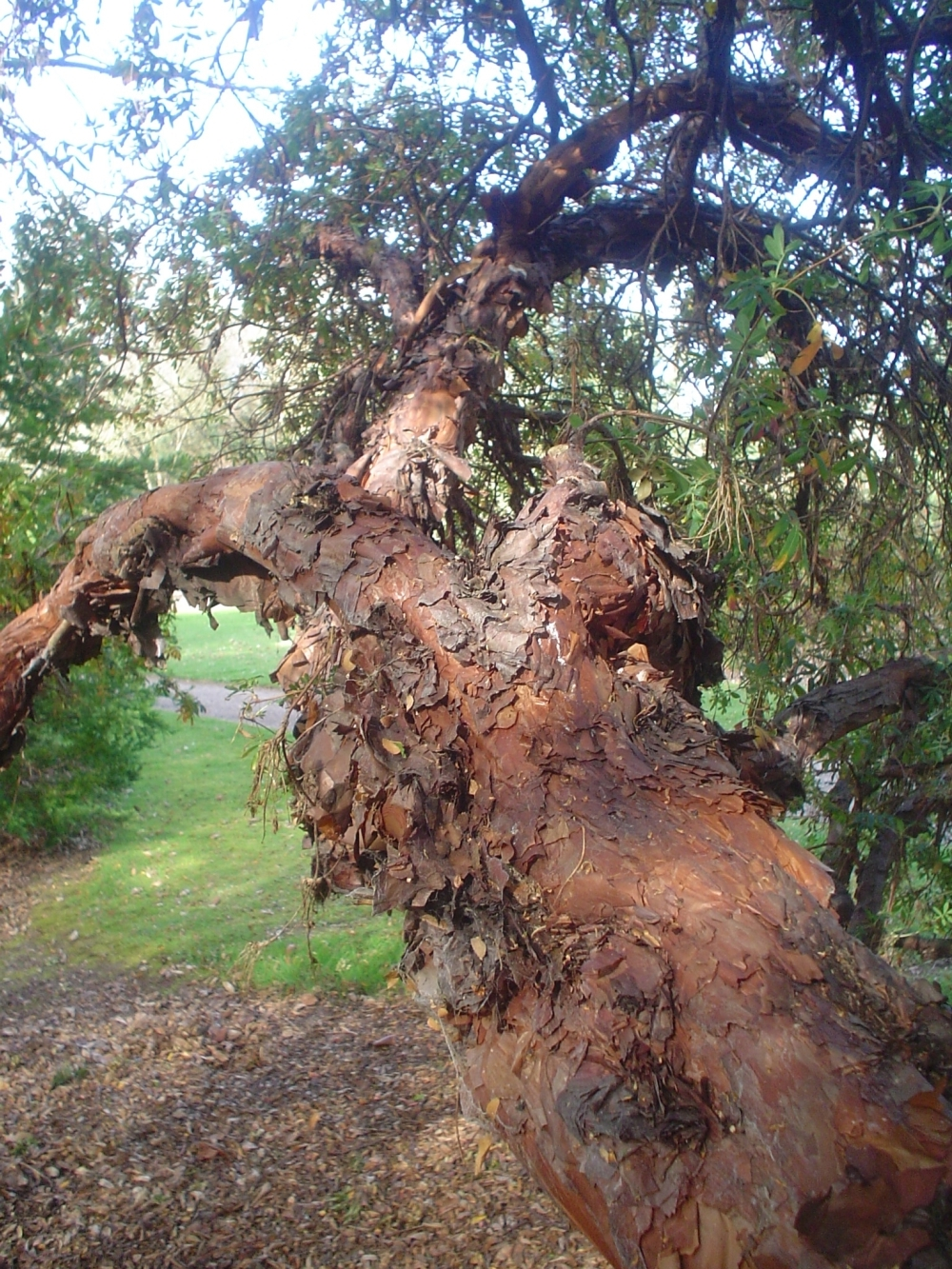
Great specimen of Tabaquillo

Not only the rocky walls of the ravines but also the granite outcrops of the Pampa de Achala, at first glance sites deprived of vegetation and of fauna, represent highly diverse habitats, capable of sustaining in their cracks and fissures a flora and fauna of significant scientific interest.

Below the 1,500 metre line, the tough grasslands of the high altitudes are replaced by thickets in which the romerillo (Heterothalamus alienus) predominates. The high altitude woodlands make way for the mountainous Chaqueño woodlands, with trees of molle and coco.

Five types of grassland plant communities have been identified in the plains; Sorghastrum and Stipa stony grassland, Muhlenbergia short grassland, Festuca medium height grassland, Deyeuxia grassland and Poa tall grassland. In addition to types of turf-dominated communities exists; Alchemilla-Festuca-Carex turf and Alchemilla-Eleocharis turf.

=== Fauna ===
The characteristics of this area primarily correspond to the Andean-Patagonian region, with the typical species of the plain encountered at an altitude that limits their distribution. The geographical isolation of the area has favoured the survival of its unique fauna. Biologists and birdwatchers from around the world travel to Pampa de Achala to observe the endemic species of the region.

Amphibians

Amphibians native to the region include Achala toads (Rhinella achalensis and Bufo achalensis,) and the "Achalan frog" (Odontophrynus achalensis).

Birds

Eleven subspecies and species of birds of the Passeriform order of Andean-Patagonian lineage are exclusive to this area, including: rufous-banded miner, common miner, bar-winged cinclodes, white-winged cinclodes, cordilleran canastero, puna castanero, white-tailed shrike-tyrant, cinereous ground tyrant, plain-colored seedeater, plumbeous sierra finch (also known as yal plomizo) and ash-breasted sierra finch (also called yal chico), long-tailed meadowlark (Sturnella loyca obscura), which nests in the ground and in large, oddly-shaped rocks.

The most inaccessible cliff walls are used as nesting sites by the black-chested buzzard-eagle (Geranoetus melanoleucus), the peregrine falcon (Falco peregrinus) and the Andean condor (Vultur gryphus).

The Andean condor is one of the more recognized species in the area; as of 2007, 101 Andean condors remained in the region. The king vulture (Sarcoramphus papa) has also been spotted in Pampa de Achala.

Mammals

Among the 30 other species of mammals native to the region is the culpeo or Andean fox (Lycalopex culpaeus), puma (Puma concolor), the colocolo (Leopardus colocolo); and Geoffroy's cat (Leoparudus geoffroyi).

Small rodents and hare are also abundantly present in the area. Guanacos have recently been reintroduced to the region, as they were disappearing slowly towards the early twentieth century.

Insects

The local scorpion, (Urophonius achalensis), is of particular interest. Of the numerous species of arthropod, the fire ant stands out on account of the size of its nests and pathways.

Reptiles

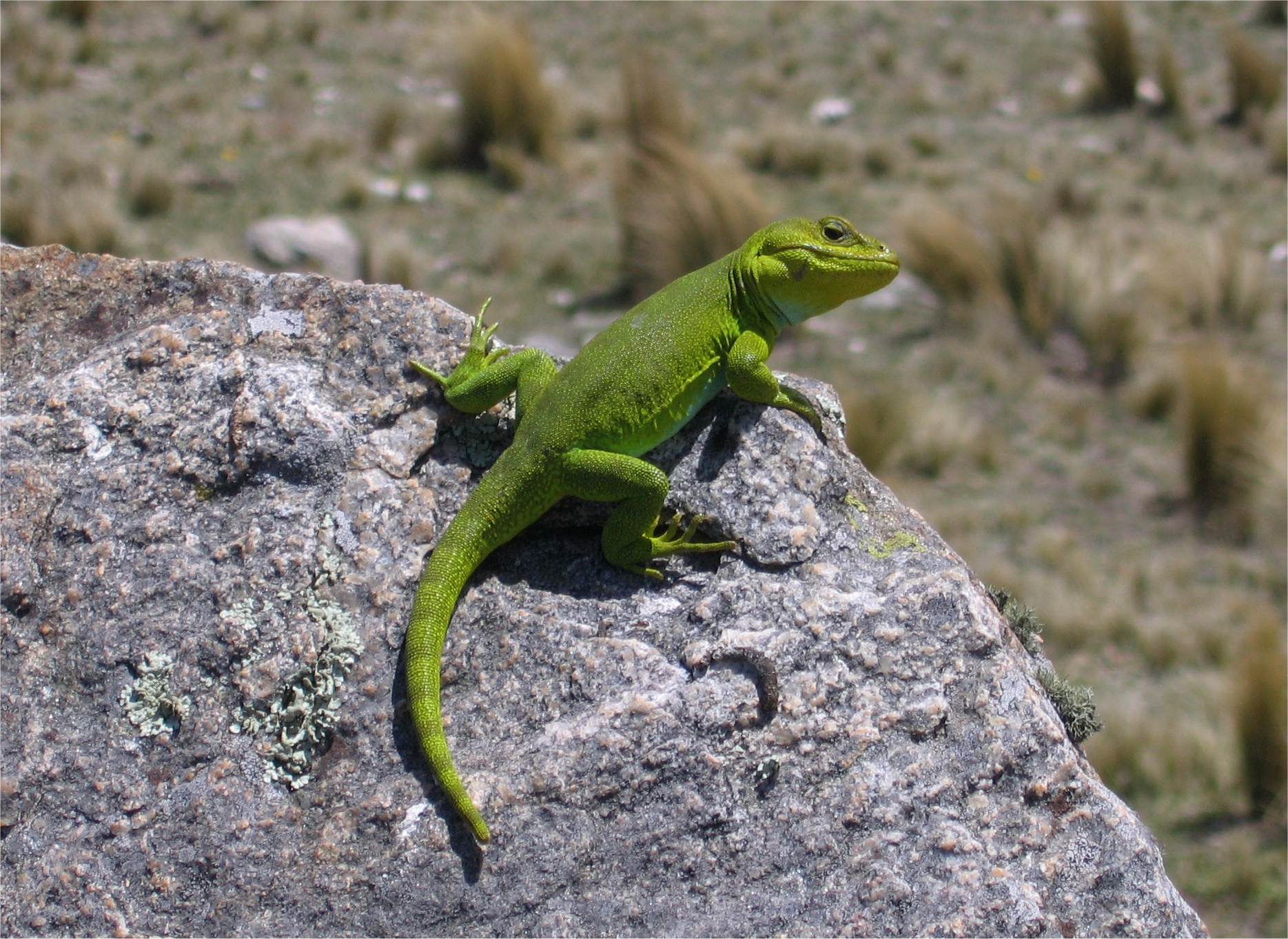
Achala's green lizard (Pristidactylus achalensis)

Along the arroyos are well-watered areas (fertile plains, marshes) and reed beds where the native coral snake Liophis anomalus (Spanish: culebra listada) feeds on the local tree frog Hyla pulchella (Spanish: ranitas de zarzal or "bramble-patch frogs").

An endemic species is also to be found, the eye-catching green lizard of Achala, Prystidactilus achalensis.

The sole venomous snake is a species of hognose snake, Lystrophis dorbignyi (Spanish: yarará ñata).

Fish

The commonest species of fish in the water courses of the Pampa de Achala are the rainbow trout, arroyo trout (Salvelinus fontinalis), Astyanax fasciatus (Spanish: mojarra), and Spanish: dientudo. Indiscriminate fishing has caused the loss of numerous species throughout the region (and indeed the entire province). The rivers and arroyos are perpetually being re-stocked with salmon, with the intention of maintaining the ecology. Regrettably the goal can never be reached, as secret fishing is constant and difficult to control, and has caused the loss of very many species. As at September 2009, all fishing in all locations throughout the province is forbidden during the hours of darkness.

== History ==
=== Pre-history ===
The original inhabitants of the region were the Comechingones, the indigenous inhabitants of the plains and mountains beginning approximately 500 years ago, and who are responsible for most of the names given to the major elements of the region of the Cordoba mountains. They arrived in the region by fleeing the persecution of Spanish colonizers. In the area of pampa de oláen, researchers have found evidence of an earlier culture, ayampití, which existed in the region approximately 6,000 years earlier.

=== Modern population ===
The population of the region is extremely low. Access to the region is difficult, with many roads being steep, and many areas accessible only by walking or riding a mule or horse. Obtaining water is not easy, as it seeps down to the bedrock very quickly. Electricity is provided exclusively through solar power. Despite the difficulties of living in Pampa de Achela, schools exist in the region (including Ceferino Namuncurá, Padre Liqueno, among others) that serve as convergence points for inhabitants of the area. Some schools have to offset their academic terms due to inclement weather in the winter (consisting of temperatures regularly approaching −20 °C (−4 °F), accompanied by strong winds and snow), causing classes to be suspended until spring. The region also contains some very basic health centers.

The principal activity of the region is the breeding and raising of goats, cattle, and sheep. These animals are used to sustain the inhabitants of the region through the sale of leather, and raw or woven wool. Some inhabitants also produce pottery to sell to tourists.

== Economy ==
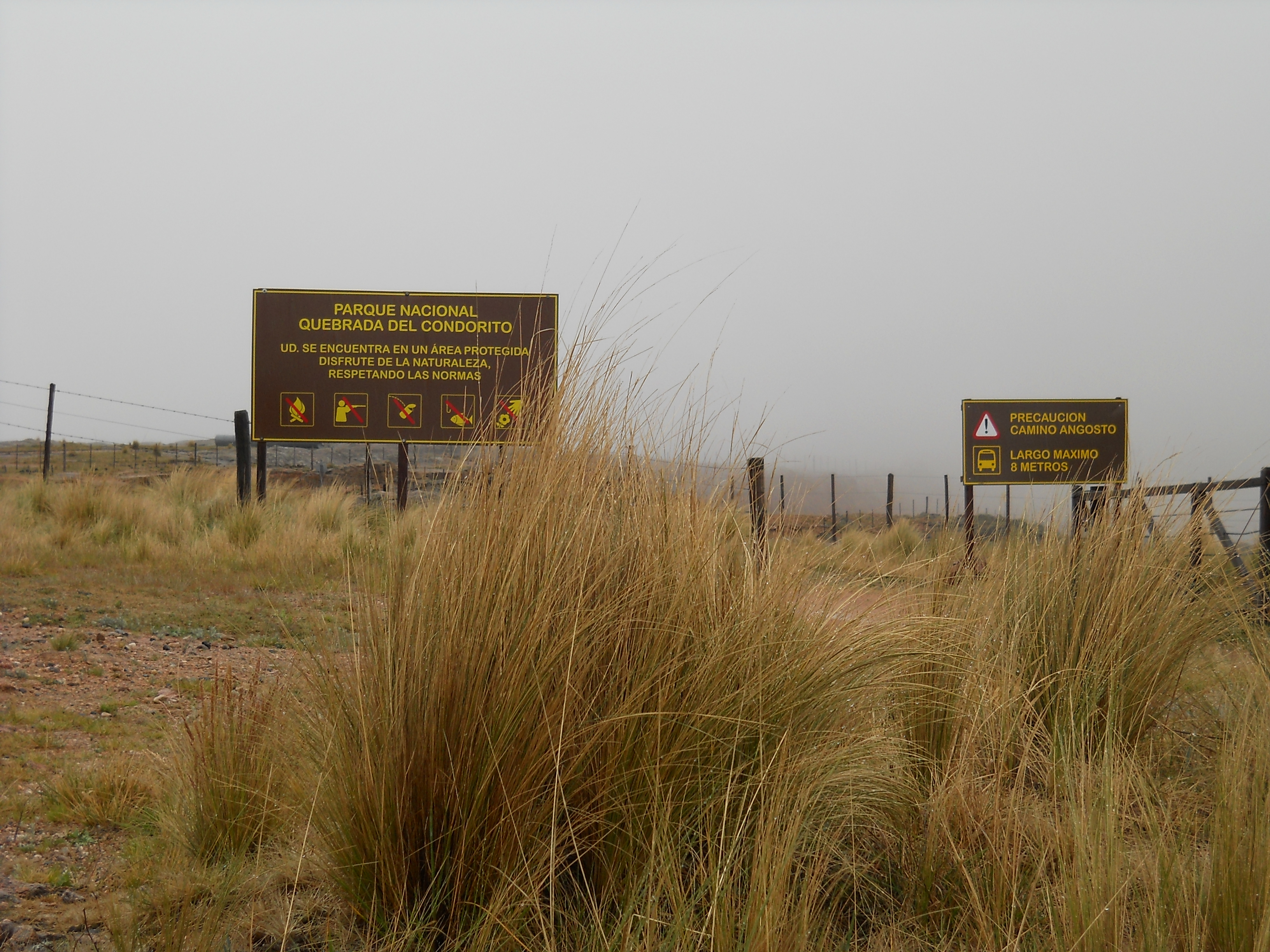
Entrance to National Park Quebrada del Condorito, in the Pampa de Achala

=== Tourism and ecology ===
Some areas (particularly Los Gigantes) have high mountain ranges are used by climbers, both amateur and professional, as well as Scout groups. During the summer, the water ways that have small sandy beaches at their banks attracts some tourists. Another popular attraction is "the path of the high peaks". While the current route is relatively new (the project dates from the late 1950s), the original existed before the twentieth century and is known as a path of suspension bridges. The route was constructed along the path of a public trail, which was used by hikers and horseback riders. Its construction is due to the tireless work of the priest José Gabriel del Rosario Brochero, more famously known as the Cura Gaucho. Today, this road is used as one of the stages of the world rally championship, and as a tourist attraction. With the declaration of natural reserves (and national park area of the Quebrada del Condorito), it is expected that the impact of the tourism on the ecology of the region will be measured and controlled to better protect the local ecology.

=== Mining ===
Mining in the area is limited, as it has been proven that mining is devastatingly detrimental to the area's ecology. There are a few mines in the area that were established prior to the creation of the reserve, and they operate under strict environmental controls. The most notable of the mines in the area is the uranium mine of the Los Gigantes, property of ADARSA, which extracts and processes material for the nuclear power plants of Embalse and Atucha.

=== Legislation ===
The region was declared a Provincial Water Reserve in 1999 due to the area receiving the most precipitation in the province (in the form of both rain and snow), providing most of the water resources for Cordoba and surrounding provinces.

This transforms the area into the most important watershed of central Argentina.

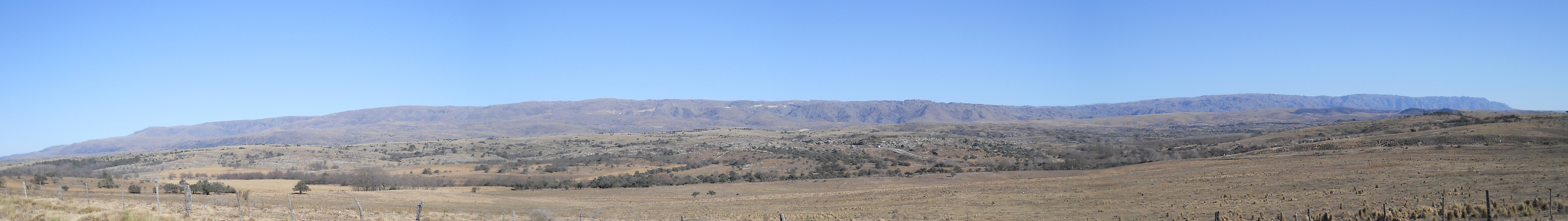
Panoramic picture of the region. On the left the northern region of the 'Sierra de Comechingones' is visible, at center the 'Cumbres de Achala', and to the right the 'Sierra de Los Gigantes'. In combination they form the Pampa de Achala, 60 km in extent.

== Referenced sources ==
- GEUNA, Silvana E., ESCOSTEGUY, Leonardo D., MIRO, Roberto et al. La susceptibilidad magnética del batolito de Achala (Devónico, Sierra Grande de Córdoba) y sus diferencias con otros granitos achalianos. Revista de la Asociación Geológica Argentina, jul./sep. 2008, vol.63, no.3, p. 380-394. ISSN 0004-4822.
- Refugio de Animales Autóctonos por decreto 1174/64 dentro de Decreto Ley de Caza 4046/58, art. 25.
- Veda Permanente de Caza. Resoluciones Anuales en marco de Decreto Ley de Caza 4046/58.
- Ley de Creación del Parque Nacional Quebrada del Condorito 24.749/96.
- Decreto de creación de la Reserva Hídrica Provincial de Achala N 361 del 31 de marzo de 1999.
- Reserva Hídrica provincial de Achala – Secretaría de ambiente – Gobierno de la provincia de Córdoba.
- Parque Nacional Quebrada del Condorito – Gobierno de la Provincia de Córdoba

== See also ==
- Sierras de Córdoba
- Sierras Pampeanas

== Bibliography ==
- Dimitri, Milan J., and Parodi, Lorenzo R., 1978: Enciclopedia Argentina de Agricultura y Jardinería T1, Vol 1 y Vol 2. Buenos Aires: Editorial ACME S.A.C.I.
