= Sierras de Córdoba =

Mountain range in Argentina

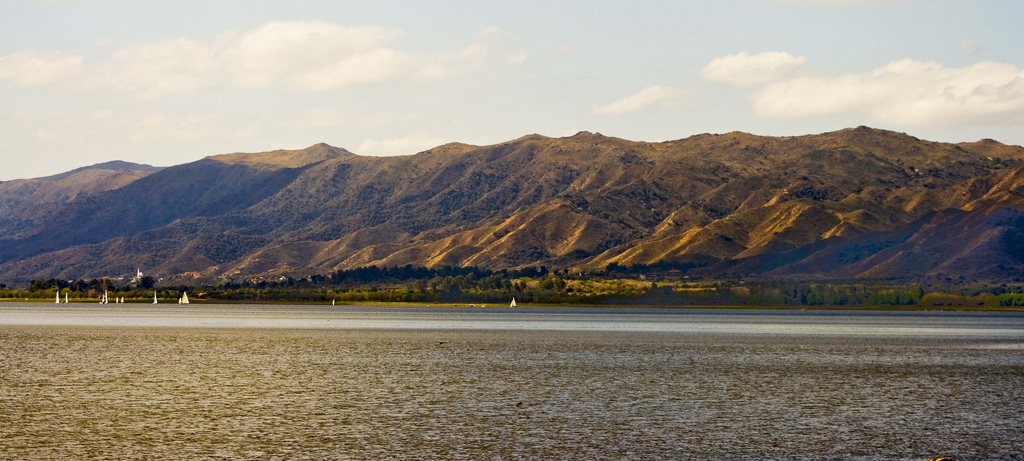
- Sierras de Córdoba

Highest point
- Elevation: 2,880 m (9,450 ft)
- Coordinates: 31°30′S 65°00′W

Dimensions
- Length: 430 km (270 mi)

Geography
- Country: Argentina
- Provinces: Córdoba; San Luis

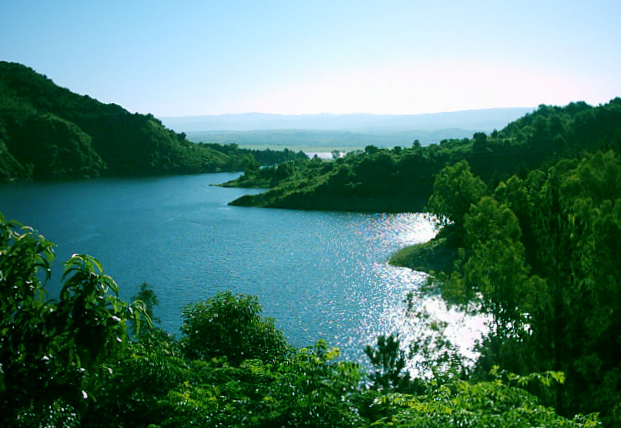
Lake Los Molinos in the Paravachasca valley.

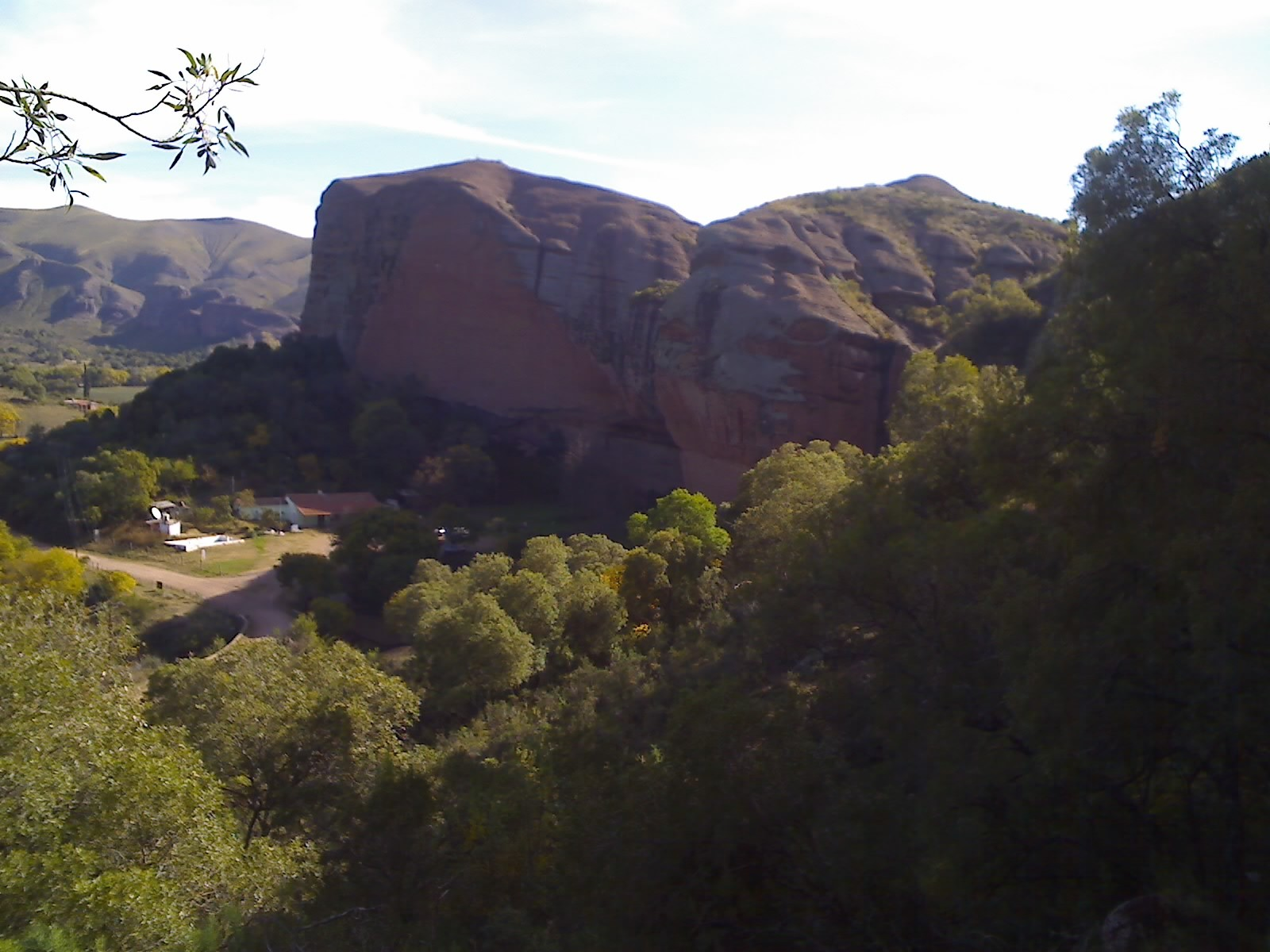
Formation of rocks, in Ongamira Valley

The Sierras de Córdoba is a mountain range in central Argentina, located between the Pampas to the east and south and the Chaco to the north and east. Most of the range is located in Córdoba Province, except for the southwestern margin which is in San Luis Province.

The Sierras de Córdoba are part of the Sierras Pampeanas, a group of mountain ranges which extend north and south on the eastern side of the Andes. The Sierras de Córdoba are covered in dry forests, grasslands, woodlands, and shrublands, and are home to rare and endemic species of plants and animals.

Parts of the Sierras have long been used for extensive cattle grazing, which has transformed the mountains' ecology. Other economic activities include tourism and winegrowing.

== Geography ==
The Sierras de Cordoba extend about 430 km from south to north, from 29º S to 33º 30’ S. They consist of four sub-ranges, the Sierras del Norte, Sierras Chicas, Sierras Grandes, and Cumbres de Gaspar. The range has a largely rounded contour. The highest peak in the Sierras de Córdoba is Mount Champaquí (2880 m) in the Sierras Grandes.

The northern part, known as the Sierras del Norte, is considerably lower and less rugged. The Sierras Chicas extend along the east, rising above the eastern plains and the city of Córdoba. The Sierras Grandes lie west of the Sierras Chicas, and include the highest peaks. The Cumbres de Gaspar lie west of the Sierras Chicas and north of the Sierras Grandes. The Sierras de Comechingones are a southern extension of the Sierras Grandes. A dry plateau lies to the west, between the Sierras and the Andes.

There are numerous springs and streams along the range. Most drain into salt lakes, including Mar Chiquita to the northeast and Salinas Grandes and Salinas_de_Ambargasta on the plateau to the west. The Quinto River drains the southern portion of the Sierras.

The Tercero River originates on the eastern slope of the central Sierras, and drains eastwards through the Espinal to empty into the Paraná River.

== Geology ==
The Sierras de Córdoba are much older than the Andes, having been formed in the Paleozoic and extensively eroded. The mountains, when first built, formed the boundary between Gondwana and the then-expanding Pacific Ocean. They consist chiefly of metamorphic rocks such as quartzite, which were formed when large quantities of marine sediment were subject to enormous heat and pressure. In the Ordovician, there was extremely intense volcanism over the region, almost all of which is now completely eroded.

The Sierras de Córdoba where the effects of the ancient Pampean orogeny can be observed, owes it modern uplift and relief to the Andean orogeny in the Tertiary.

== Climate ==
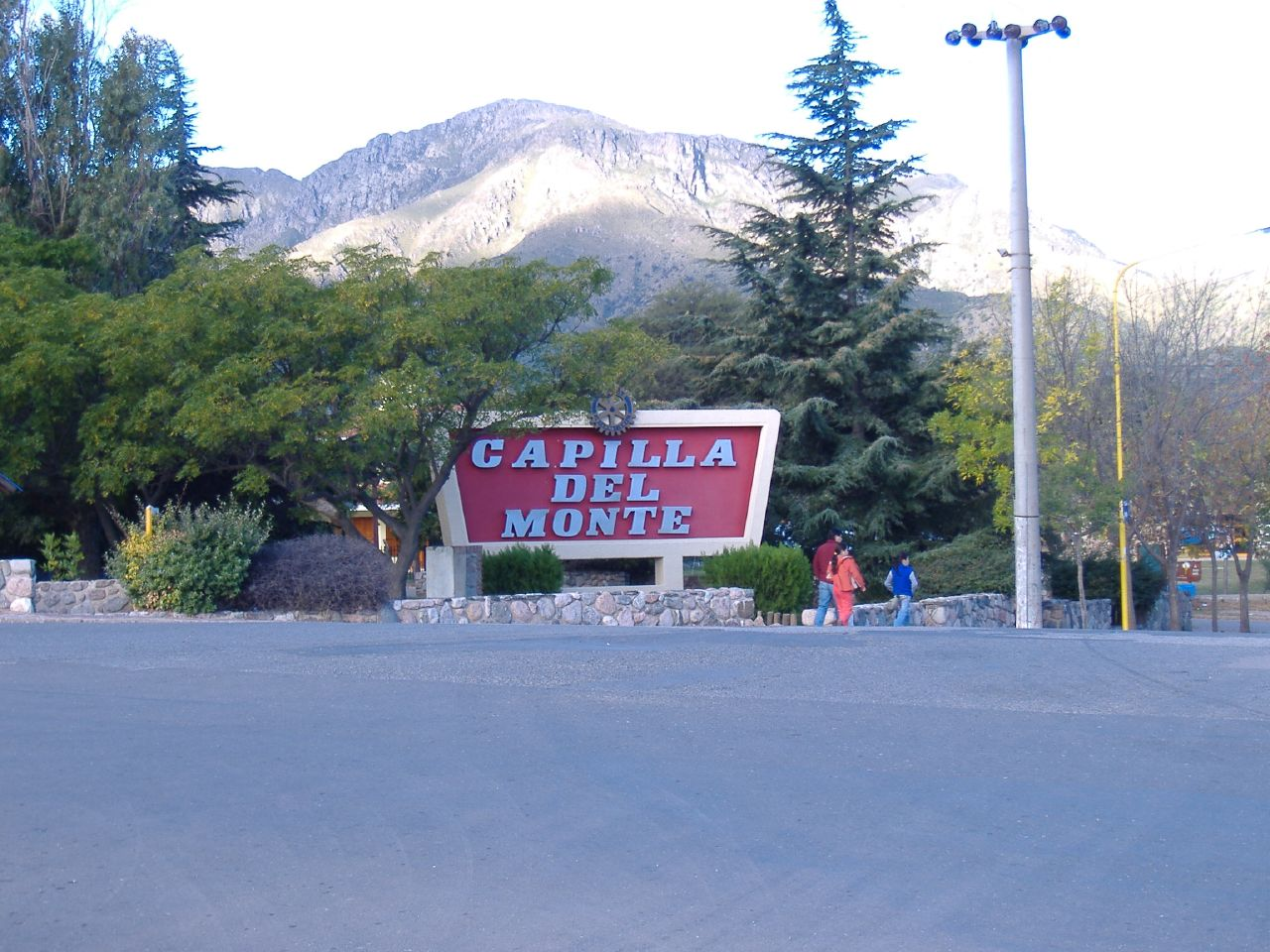
Capilla del Monte

At lower elevations, the Sierra de Córdoba has a warm temperate to subtropical climate (Köppen Cwa), with hot, wet summers with frequent thunderstorms and mild, dry winters. Average annual rainfall at Córdoba is about 715 mm (28.1 in) but is highly variable. On the eastern side of the Sierra, rainfall can be as high as 1,200 mm (47 in) per year, but it quickly drops off on the western side to less than 400 millimetres (16 inches). Maximum temperatures at low elevations are high, ranging from 33 °C (91 °F) in summer to 16 °C (61 °F) in winter, but at elevations above 2000 meters, it has a monsoon-influenced continental climate (Köppen Dwb), average temperatures are about 10–14 °C (50–57 °F) cooler and exposure is very high. However, because the winters are so dry, very little snow falls even at the highest elevations and there is no evidence of glacial or periglacial features from the Pleistocene.

The cooler climate in the mountains has encouraged development of many summer resorts for the wealthy of Córdoba, notably Alta Gracia and Jesús María.

== Flora and fauna ==
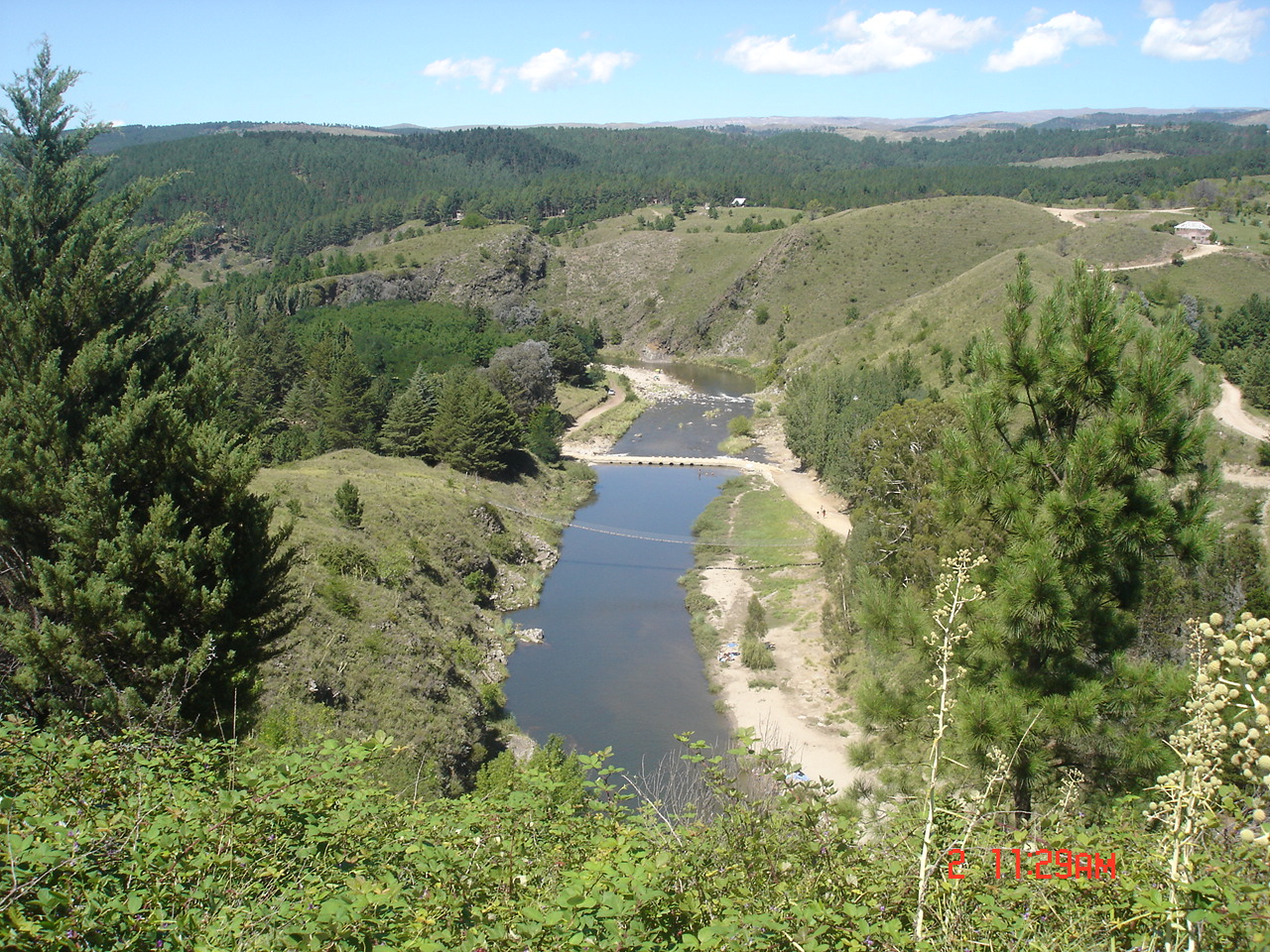
River El Durazno

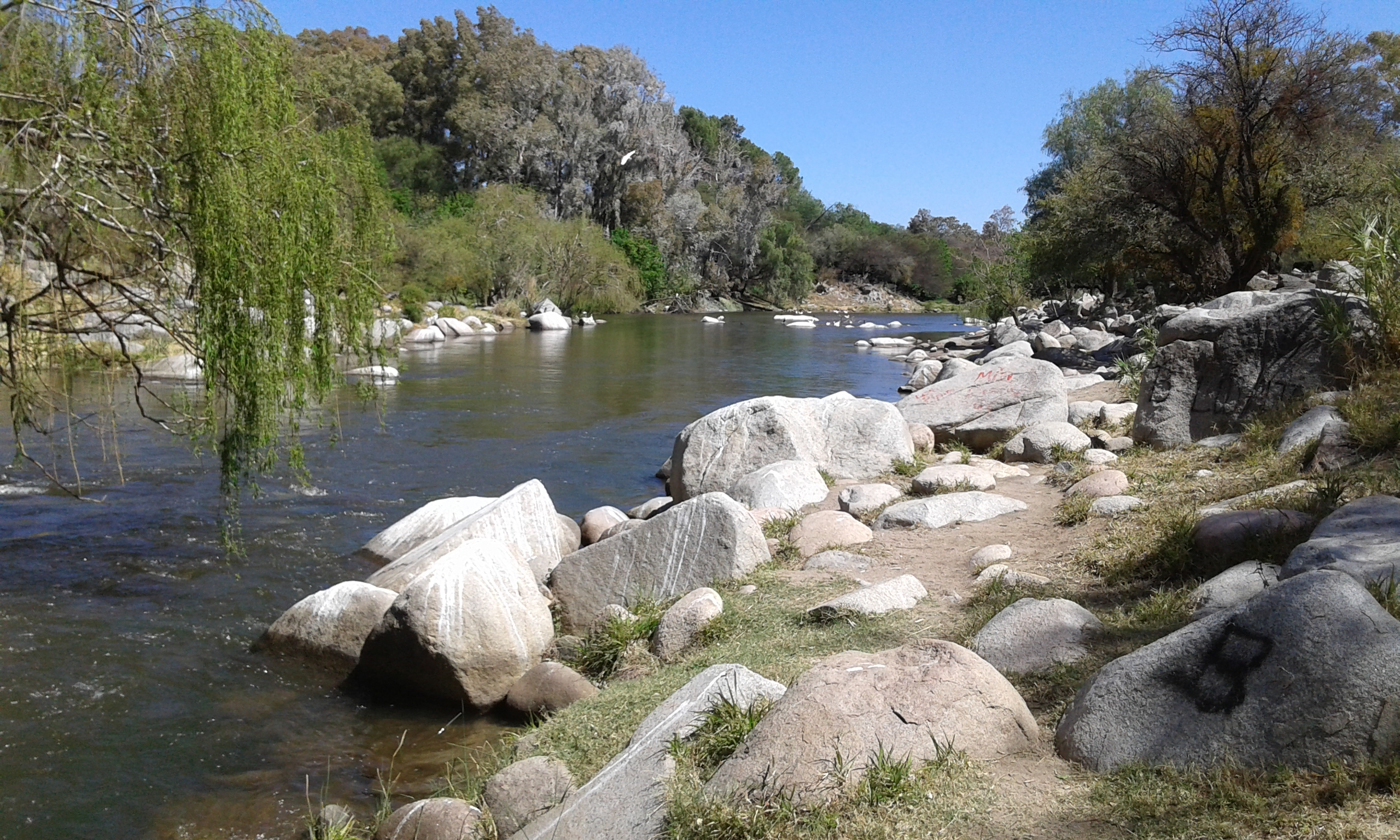
River Cruz del Eje

The Sierras de Córdoba lie between the Espinal ecoregion to the east and the Chaco ecoregion to the west. Rainfall is generally higher on the eastern slopes, and the western slopes are in the drier rain shadow of the mountains. The flora and fauna of the Sierras is related to that of the Chaco region, except for high elevations, where Andean species predominate.

Lowland dry forest extends up to 750 meters elevation, with Espinal vegetation, including species of Prosopis and Acacia, on the eastern slopes, and lowland Chaco vegetation, including Aspidosperma quebracho-blanco, on the western slopes.

Foothill dry forest, known as Chaco Serrano, extends from 500 to 1300 meters elevation. Lithraea molleoides and Zanthoxylum coco are the predominant trees on the eastern slopes, with Schinopsis haenkeana dominant on the dry western slopes. Romerillal shrubland is found between 1300 and 1700 meters elevation, characterized by the shrub Heterothalamus alienus. Grasslands of Festuca hieronymi and species of Stipa and Piptochaetium are found between 1500 and 1850 meters elevation. Forests and woodlands of tabaquillo (Polylepis australis) are found in sheltered ravines and stream valleys and canyon bottoms with access to year-round moisture. Polylepis australis is typical of the eastern Andes, and the Sierras de Córdoba are the eastern and southern extent of its range. Other species of the Polylepis woodlands include the tree Maytenus boaria and the shrubs Escallonia cordobensis, Berberis hieronimii, Satureja spp., and the dwarf shrub Gaultheria poeppigii.

High exposure causes the limits of tree growth to be much lower than in the Andes, generally about 2000 meters elevation. High-elevation plant communities include grasslands dominated by Deyeuxia hieronymi, Poa stuckertii, Alchemilla pinnata, and Festuca circinata; shrublands dominated by Berberis hieronymi, and Polylepis australis woodlands in sheltered areas. Many of the species in this alpine zone are very rare, and include species endemic to the Sierras.

Herds of guanaco (Lama guanicoe) once ranged across the Sierras and the Chaco lowlands, but by the beginning of the 20th century they had been extirpated by hunters.

More than 100 bird species are found in the mountains, but ranching and hunting have reduced most native mammal populations severely. Two species of birds are endemic to the mountains. The Córdoba cinclodes (Cinclodes comechingonus) breeds only in the mountains, where it inhabits forest patches of tabaquillo (Polylepis australis) close to water between 1,600 and 2,800 meters elevation. Olrog's cinclodes (Cinclodes olrogi) is found in areas of open grass-covered rock formations near streams and lakes between 1,500 and 2,400 meters elevation. Other native birds include the Andean condor (Vultur gryphus), Andean tinamou (Nothoprocta pentlandii), olive-crowned crescentchest (Melanopareia maximiliani), cliff flycatcher (Hirundinea ferruginea), Chaco sparrow (Rhynchospiza strigiceps), and black-and-rufous warbling finch (Poospiza nigrorufa).

Overgrazing, over-hunting, human-caused fires, and firewood harvesting have altered the flora and fauna of the mountains, creating soil erosion in large areas and reducing the extent of forests and woodlands.

It is believed that the vegetation of the Sierra de Córdoba has varied greatly over the Quaternary, with some periods in the Holocene between 8000 and 500 years before today when forests extended to the now-dry western side of the mountain range and the adjacent Sierra de San Luis. At other times, such as glacial periods and the earliest part of the Holocene, the whole mountain range was completely treeless due to extremely low rainfall. This may explain why few endemics are found outside the zone above the timberline — where species that have inhabited the area for thousands of years take a kind of refuge from a warmer, wetter climate.

== Protected areas ==
Quebrada del Condorito National Park covers an area of 245.89 km^{2}. It lies within the Pampa de Achala Provincial Water Reserve (245.89 km^{2}), which covers a plateau in the central Sierra above 1500 meters elevation. The water reserve includes the peaks Champaquí (2,790 m) in the south, and Cerro Mogote (2,374 m) as highest peak in Los Gigantes in the north.

Other protected areas include La Calera Nature Reserve (113.77 km^{2}) immediately west of Córdoba, the La Quebrada Nature Water Reserve (42 km^{2}) northwest of Córdoba, and the provincial water reserve in the massif of Los Gigantes.

== People ==
Most of the population of the region lives in Córdoba city, which contains about half the provincial population — with most of the rest in the Pampas region well east of the range. The lack of arable land means that few people live in the mountains themselves, where the major industries are grazing and tourism.

== Tourism ==
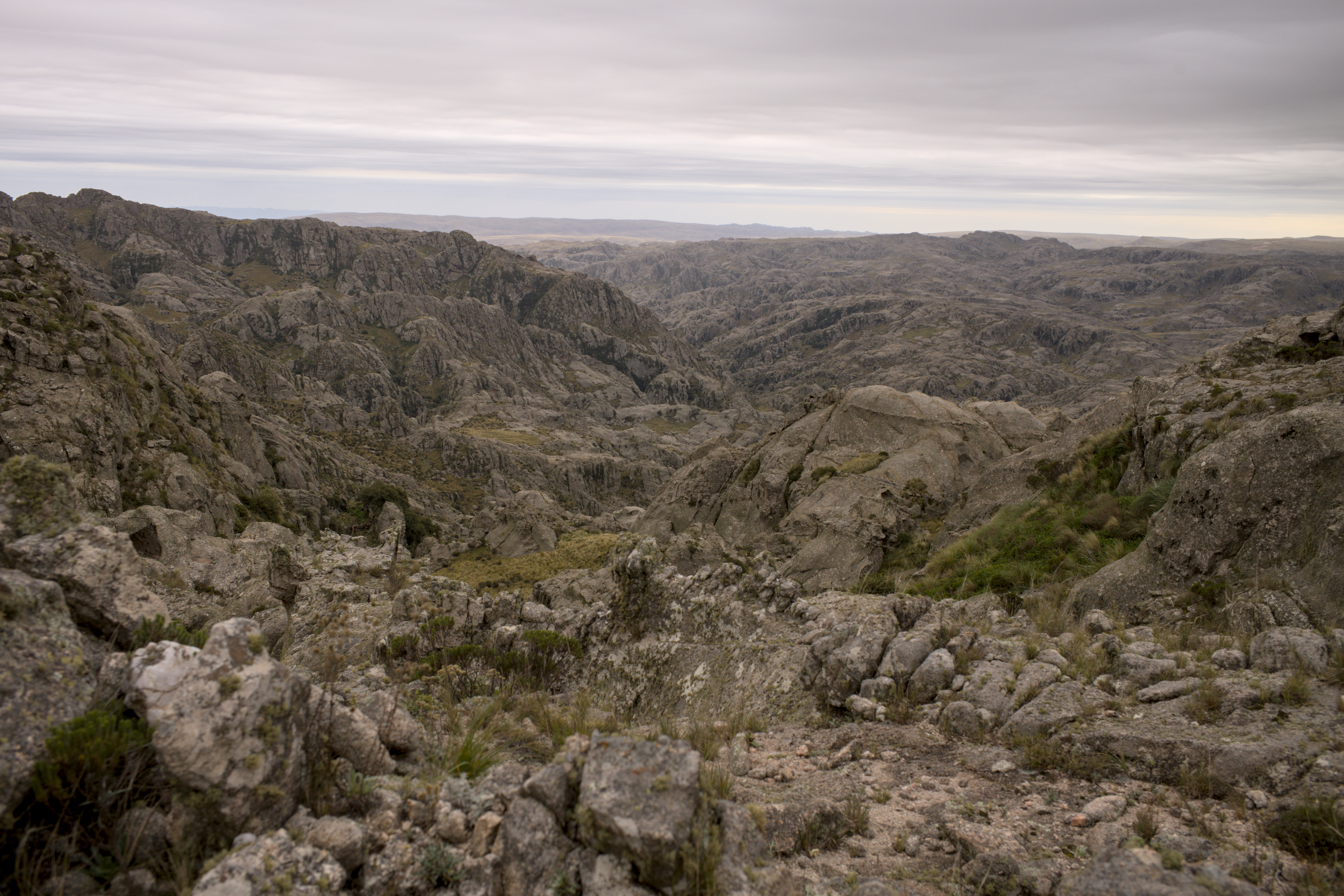
The view along a hiking trail in the Los Gigantes massif.

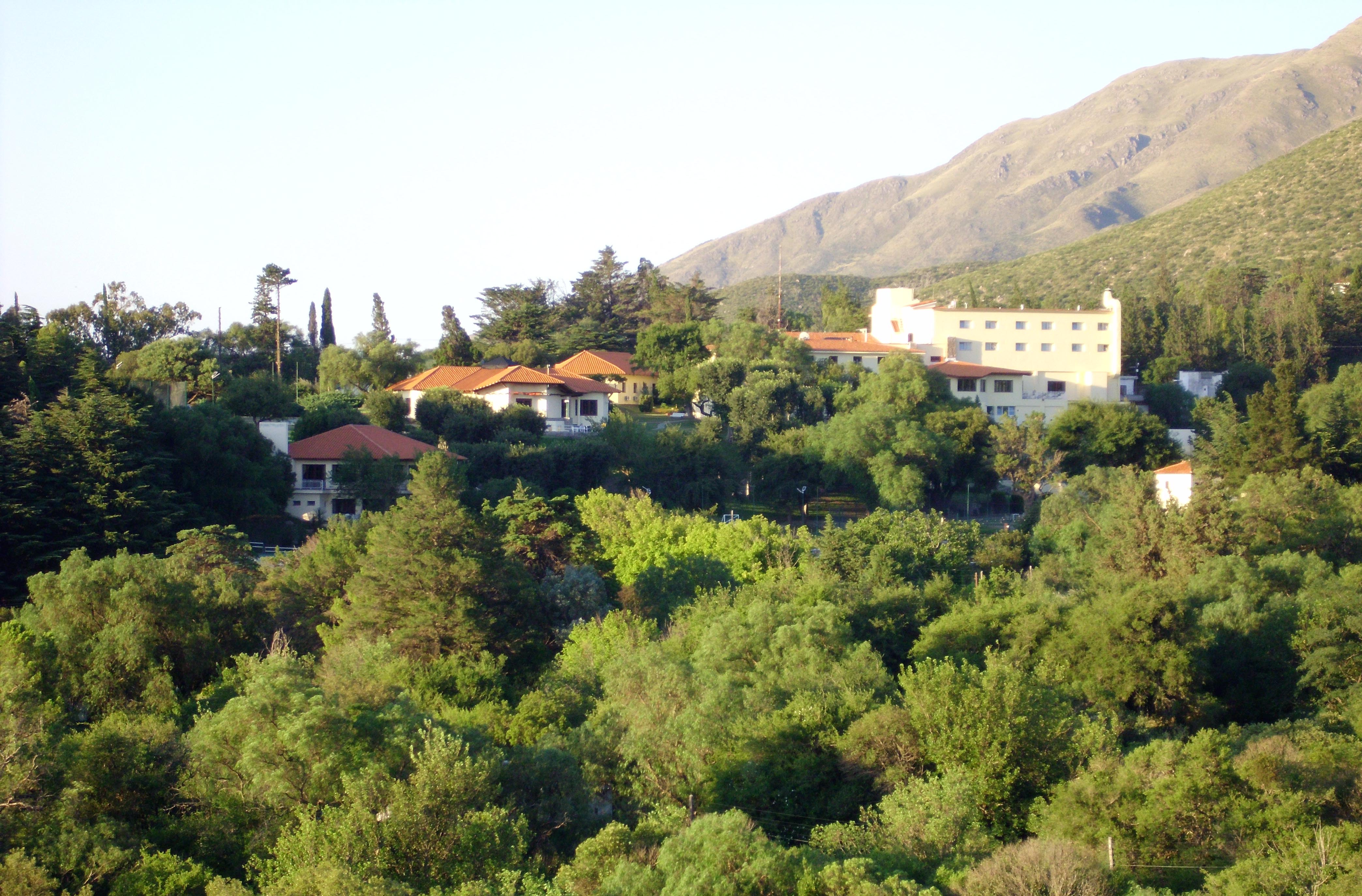
Touristic town of Los Cocos.

The Sierras de Córdoba is one of the most important holiday centers of Argentina. Three million tourists visit the Sierras annually. The most important tourist destinations are Villa Carlos Paz, Cosquín, La Falda, Alta Gracia, and Villa General Belgrano amongst others.

In addition to resorts and wineries, the mountains are a popular destination for trekking and hiking, with trails that range from short walks to multi-day routes across the Sierras Grandes. Some of the mountain ranges, like Los Gigantes are also common destinations for rock climbing, offering various mountain refuges for climbers and hikers.

The region is also one of the few places outside the Andes where wild Andean condors can be observed, particularly within Quebrada del Condorito National Park.

== Wineries ==
Two areas were large producers of wine in the past: Colonia Caroya in the north, and Villa Dolores in the west. These areas traditionally focused on cheaper, sweet wines for domestic consumption. In recent years, sophisticated wine-making has begun taking place, both in these 'traditional' locations, as well as in exciting terroirs in the eastern side of the mountains, around Villa General Belgrano and La Cumbrecita. The area has a cooler climate, with some (light) snowfall in the winter, and a number of boutique wineries have experimented with different grape types and techniques, sometimes with exceptional results (Familia Navarro Torre recently was awarded a gold medal in the Vinandino competition with a Cabernet-Malbec from 2009). The region is otherwise known for its craft beers because of the large German Argentine community established there.

== See also ==
- Geological history of the Precordillera terrane
