= Camino de las Altas Cumbres =

Highway in Argentina

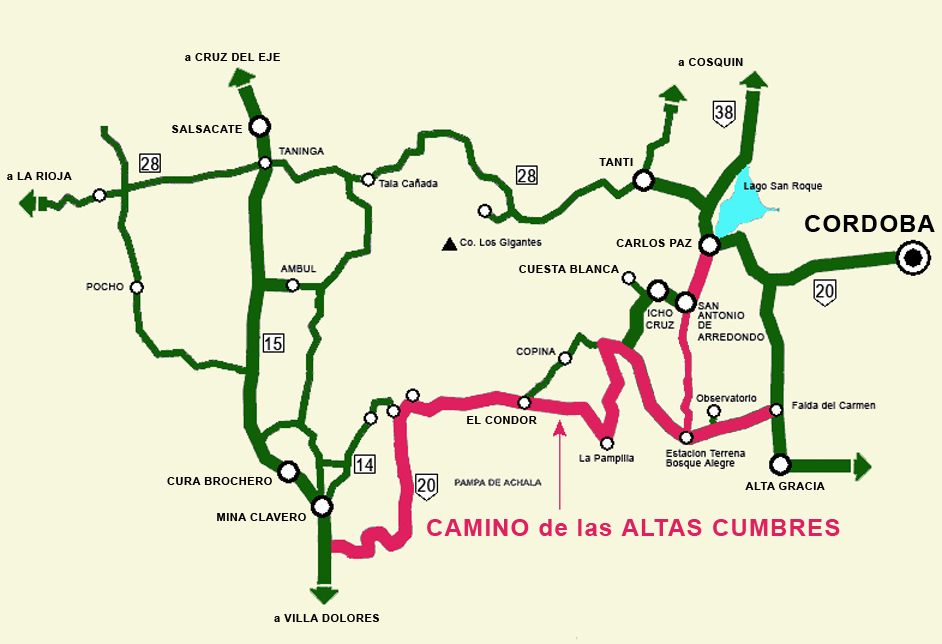
Altas Cumbres Road

Camino de las Altas Cumbres is a road in Córdoba, Argentina. It has been described to tourists as "the most spectacular route in the Sierras".

== Planning ==
In the last years of the 1950s, it became clear that there was a need to modernize the old Hanging Bridges Trail in the province of Córdoba, Argentina. Increasing traffic and trade between the provinces of Cordoba Mendoza and San Juan needed new roads to expedite travelling times and decrease costs. At the same time, it was considered important to create a route linking the ports of the Atlantic with the Pacific through the Cordoba corridor.

In 1956, President of Provincial Roads Engineer Laisseca said that it was inappropriate for the old road to be improved, but a new one should be built using the best modern technology. For this reason, during the administration of Governor Arturo Zanichelli, an aerial survey of that region of the Sierras Grandes was undertaken to map the topography. Roads were cut to enable surveyors to design the best route.

== The work ==
Before starting to implement the project, it was necessary to open side routes to reach fixed sites and to build a complex infrastructure in the mountains that included workshops for vehicle maintenance, equipment and machinery, generators and shelters for workers.

Road construction in the high peaks was slow, hard and difficult. To get into the mountains, cuts were made with explosives, bulldozers dug out the material and large-sized trucks moved it to where it was needed. The fine work was done with hand hammers.

It was very hard work because the track was made through very rugged mountain topography with numerous narrow ravines. These streams are located in the provincial water reserve Pampa de Achala, the source of many streams, permanent and semi-permanent, of low flow, tributaries of the rivers Condoritos, De la Sole, San Bernardo, Nono and Mina Clavero.

The road runs along a geological area which is dominated by sedimentary rocks and decomposing granite with little vegetation. The amount of rock moved was of the order of 2,100,000 cubic metres and 1,100 tons of explosives were used to break the mountainside.

The first part tackled was the west slopes of the Massif de Achala, a section between Paula and Nina Stone Turtle, 11 kilometres roadway length and 10 metres wide. In 1968 this section was completed and the following year another 11 km was begun, between Mina Clavero and Nina Paula, with a 20-metre carriageway.

In April 1972 the Stone Turtle to the Condor section, 32 kilometres, was built. Between 1977 and 1979, the section between Condor and the Pampilla was constructed and in 1979-198, they skipped a stretch, working between Post and Post Pedernera Bustos. Between 1983 and 1987, the Pedernera Post to the Pampilla section was completed, 8.6 km in length with a carriageway width of 19.5 metres.

Throughout this period the old Hanging Bridges Trail continued to be used and the town of Copina was the main supply center and shelter.

At first the route was not paved so as to allow the ground to settle and stabilize the natural material. In 1987 it was decided to pave all the stages to reduce future maintenance costs and provide safety to motorists and trucks that were using this new route.

Then it would be done the leg stand Bustos - Bosque and Bosque Alegre Alegre - Falda del Carmen. In 1993 he inaugurated the first full paving and Governor Ramon Mestre opened the stretch Bosque Alegre - Villa Carlos Paz.

Under an agreement between the province of Cordoba and the national government, provided for the transfer of certain routes, touching the new road of approximately 126 km, be converted into a section of the National Route 20 (Argentina).

For finalizing the Way of the high peaks, with the trace and the slopes required for heavy truck traffic and vehicle load, it is necessary to complete the last stage, which will connect with Highway Bosque Alegre Justiniano Allende Posse, linking the cities of Córdoba and Villa Carlos Paz.

== See also ==
- Pampa de Achala
- Quebrada del Condorito

== Sources ==
- Denaro, L. 2007. PASADO Y PRESENTE DEL SUR DE PUNILLA, PEDANÍA SANTIAGO. Córdoba, 2007 (Spanish)
