= Cerro Champaquí =

Mountain in Argentina

Champaquí
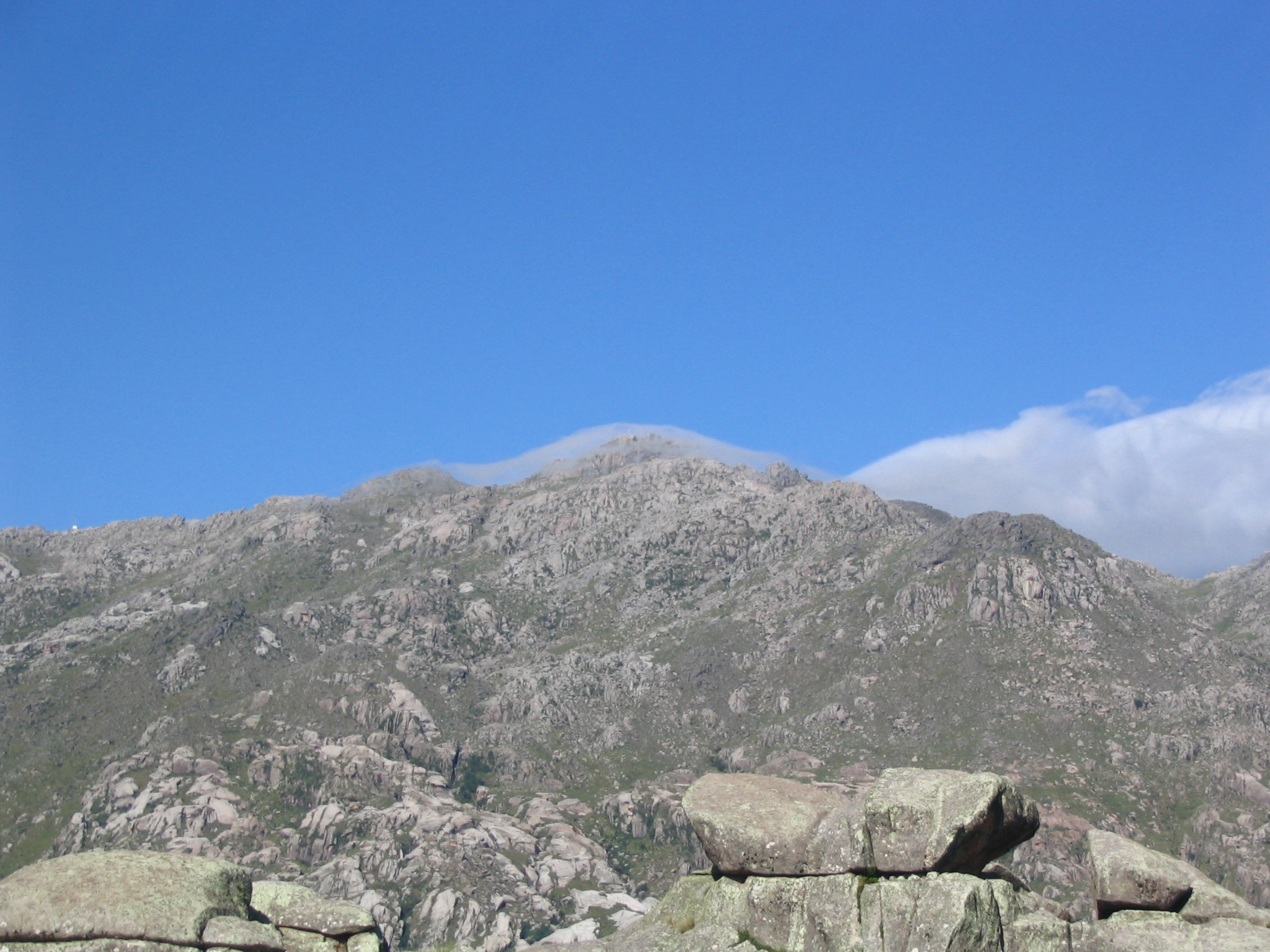

Highest point
- Elevation: 2,770 m (9,090 ft)
- Prominence: 2,207 m (7,241 ft)
- Listing: Ultra, Ribu
- Coordinates: 31°59′S 64°56′W

Geography
- Location: Argentina
- Parent range: Sierras de Córdoba

Cerro Champaquí is a mountain located west of the Argentine province of Córdoba. It is the highest peak in the province, with a height of 2,770 meters. It is considered the second natural wonder of Cordoba in the "Seven Natural Wonders of Cordoba".

Cerro Champaquí is located at the westernmost point of the Sierras de Córdoba, which is known as the Sierras Grandes. East of the mountain lies the Valle de Calamuchita. On the latter, the Valle de Traslasierra lies west of the mountain. Cerro Champaquí and its surroundings belong to the Monumento Natural Champaquí.

== Topography ==
Cerro Champaquí has moderately steep slopes to the west, with more gentle slopes on its eastern foothills. In the vicinity of the summit, there is a small lake that freezes from late April to early August. This lake is believed to be the source of the mountain's name. In the indigenous language of Comechingón, Champaqui means "Water-in-the-head / Water at the top of the hill".

On Cerro Champaqui's eastern slope is the town of Santa Rosa de Calamuchita. On the western side is the town of Villa de Las Rosas.

The common path to ascend the mountain begins at Villa Alpina on the east slopes of the mountain.

== See also ==
- Pampa de Achala
- Mountain
