= Hanging Bridges Trail =

Ancient route between Valley Traslasierra and city of Villa Carlos Paz

The Hanging Bridges Trail, or Camino de los Puentes Colgantes (Spanish), is the ancient route linking the Valley Traslasierra with the city of Villa Carlos Paz (Punilla Valley) in the Córdoba Province, Argentina. Its outstanding feature, which gives it its name, is the existence of several suspension bridges erected across mountain streams.

== The work ==
In the Province of Cordoba, the mountain range of Sierras Grandes acted as a barrier dividing the territory and hampering communications between populations located east and west of the summits of Achala. A major advocate for development in the Traslasierra Valley was the priest Brochero who argued vehemently before the authorities in 1883 on the need for construction of better roads.

In 1914 studies were completed and a proposal was made to build a road through the Sierras Grandes. The route would follow a public bridle path previously used by walkers, horses and mules and would have a width of five or six meters. Defensive structures would be used to avoid damage by flood water, and drainage channels, fords, culverts and suspension bridges would be built.

On 3 January 1915 the work was started after a ceremony at the home of Don Carlos Nicander Peace. The Governor of Cordoba, Ramón J. Carcano, said in his speech that the road to the summits would be a way of beauty. It would start from the liquid diamond edge of a lake, wind between green hills, up cultivated valleys, through primitive forests, over dark gorges with hanging bridges, cross streams and reach summits gilded by the sun and clouds.

== Construction ==
The road would be nearly 93 kilometers in length and the work was auctioned in six tranches. The project envisaged the construction of a corral and a stone masonry building at the foot of Copina for the accommodation of drovers in the event of bad weather.

Two stone memorials, one in Copina and another in the Pampa de Achala, were erected with the following inscriptions:

- COPINE / height above the sea 1448 m / CORDOBA 73 Km (sic) / Mina Clavero 60 km / 1915.
- ROAD TO THE SUMMIT / 1915 / Pampa de Achala / 2.200 mts. (sic) above the sea.

Dr. Ramon J. Carcano was about to conclude his term as Governor and hand over to his successor. Before this, he inaugurated the first four stages at a place called the creeks in Pampa de Achala on March 2, 1916. A convoy of sixty vehicles led by Carcano drove there and the event was attended by numerous people on mules and horseback because that stretch of road had not yet been constructed. At this ceremony, Fray Jose Maria Lichens made a speech praising the building of a road which would unite the scattered members of the Cordoba community and carry civilization into the interior, extending the kingdom of truth and brotherhood between souls.

The men had to overcome the mountainous territory with hand tools and explosives. After much exertion from the workers, the road was completed in 1918 and was officially opened on 22 October of that year, in a ceremony in the City of Villa Dolores that was chaired by Governor Julio C. Borda. A journalist who attended the opening ceremony wrote "The road winds up through a maze of twists and turns and travellers face death every time they round the tight corners and traverse the stony balconies".

This spectacular road, winding as it does through the mountains, crossing gorges by suspension bridges and traversing imposing cliffs, made it a unique part of the route for the epic Grand Prix, Rally Argentina. It was known as the condor stretch. Over time, this narrow and winding road, with its bridges, threatening chasms and steep gradients, proved insufficient for modern traffic. So in 1956, a study was undertaken to select a route for a new road across the mountains, the Camino de las Altas Cumbres.

== Sources ==
- Denaro, L. 2007. Past and present of Southern Punilla: Parish Santiago. Cordoba, 2007

== See also ==
- Camino de las Altas Cumbres
- Pampa de Achala
