= Quebrada del Condorito National Park =

National park in Argentina

- Parque Nacional Quebrada del Condorito
- IUCN category II (national park)
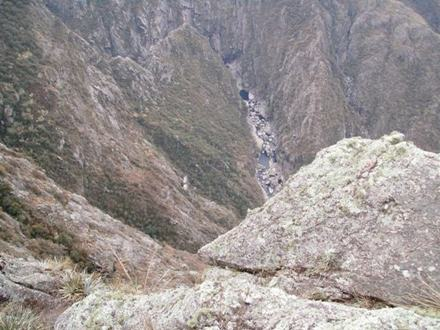
- Andean condors over the park's Balcón Sur

- Location within Argentina
- Location: Córdoba Province, Argentina
- Nearest city: Alta Gracia
- Coordinates: 31°40′S 64°40′W
- Area: 37,344 ha (373.44 km^{2}; 144.19 sq mi)
- Established: November 28, 1996
- Governing body: Argentine National Parks Administration

Quebrada del Condorito National Park (Spanish: Parque Nacional Quebrada del Condorito) is a federal protected area in Córdoba Province, Argentina. Established on 28 November 1996, it houses a representative sample of the Sierras Pampeanas biodiversity in endangered state of conservation. It has an area of 37,344 ha (373.44 km^{2}; 144.19 sq mi)

== History ==
Thousands of years ago members of the archaeologically-missing Ayampitín Culture frequented these uplands, establishing temporary camps for hunting guanaco, pampas deer and the large mammals once abundant here.

When the Spaniards arrived in the sixteenth century, the Comechingones inhabited the region.

== Description ==
Although located near the city of Cordoba and tourist towns like Villa Carlos Paz, Alta Gracia, Tanti, Mina Clavero, etc., the territory of the park has remained scenically pristine due to its inaccessibility. Extensive ranching, however, has been practiced since colonial times, resulting in intense erosion to the vegetation cover due to cattle trampling on the sandy, steep-sloped soil.

The boundaries of the park are:

- North: the new road, the Camino de las Altas Cumbres.
- West: the private properties bordering the high summits of Achala (Paso de las Piedras, La Trinidad, La Atalaya)
- South: the headwaters of the Yatán River.
- East: the private properties limiting with the 1,500 metres (4,900 ft) height level (El Bosque, El Condorito, San Miguel)

The climate in the area is mountain temperate, becoming increasingly colder with height, and with a marked temperature difference between day and night and between summer and winter. During the winter (May to early August), snowfall is rather common. Another characteristic phenomenon is the frequent lightning strikes at the higher elevations.

There are hiking trails and bike paths of different lengths and degrees of difficulty, most of them signaled. There are several areas of rough camping (no services) with access to drinking water. Considering the adverse environmental and topographical factors, visitors are advised to consult the Argentine National Parks Administration in order to safely enjoy the wild and lonely landscape.

Quebrada del Condorito National Park scenery

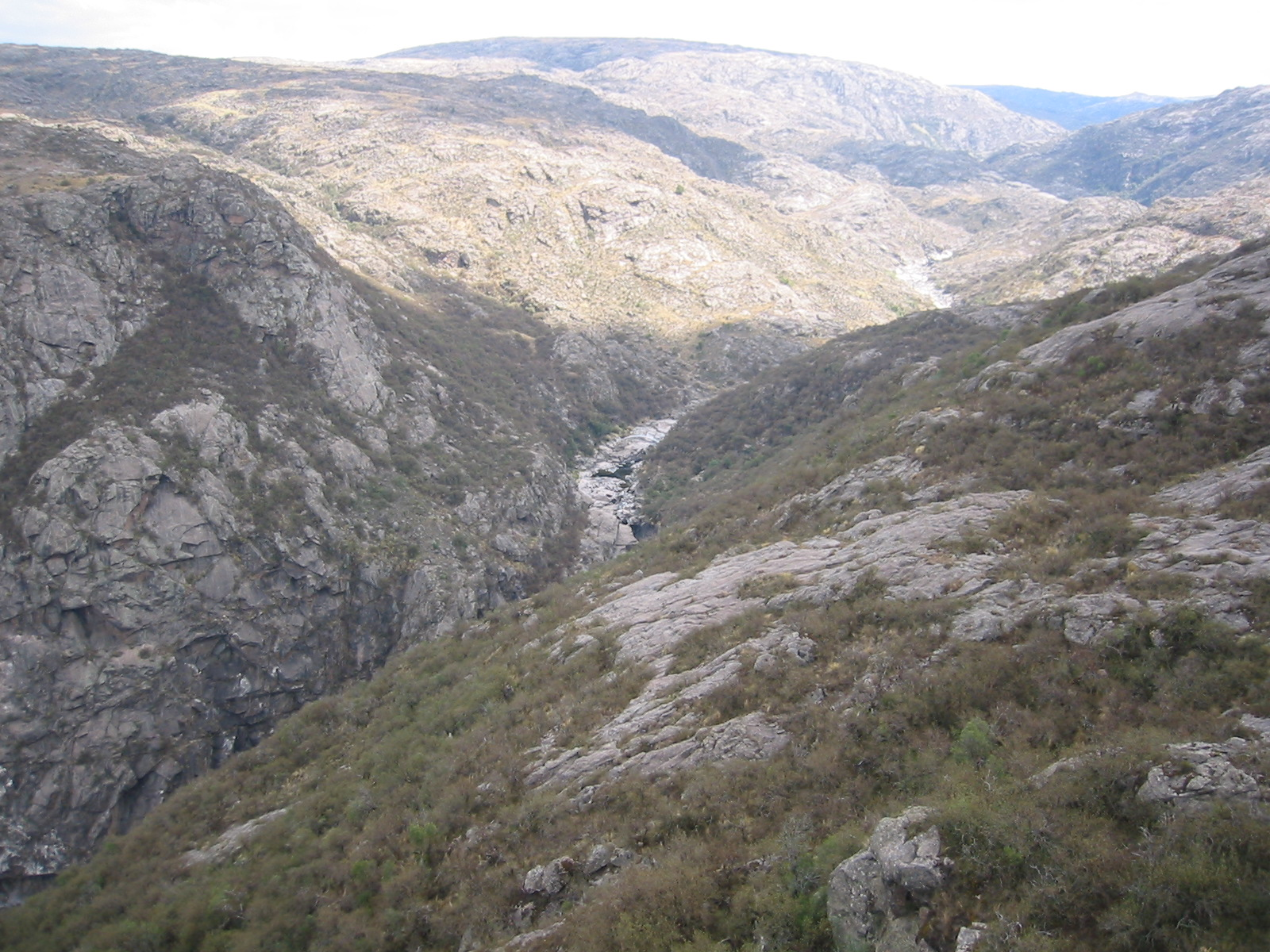
Many streams run throughout the park's narrow gorges

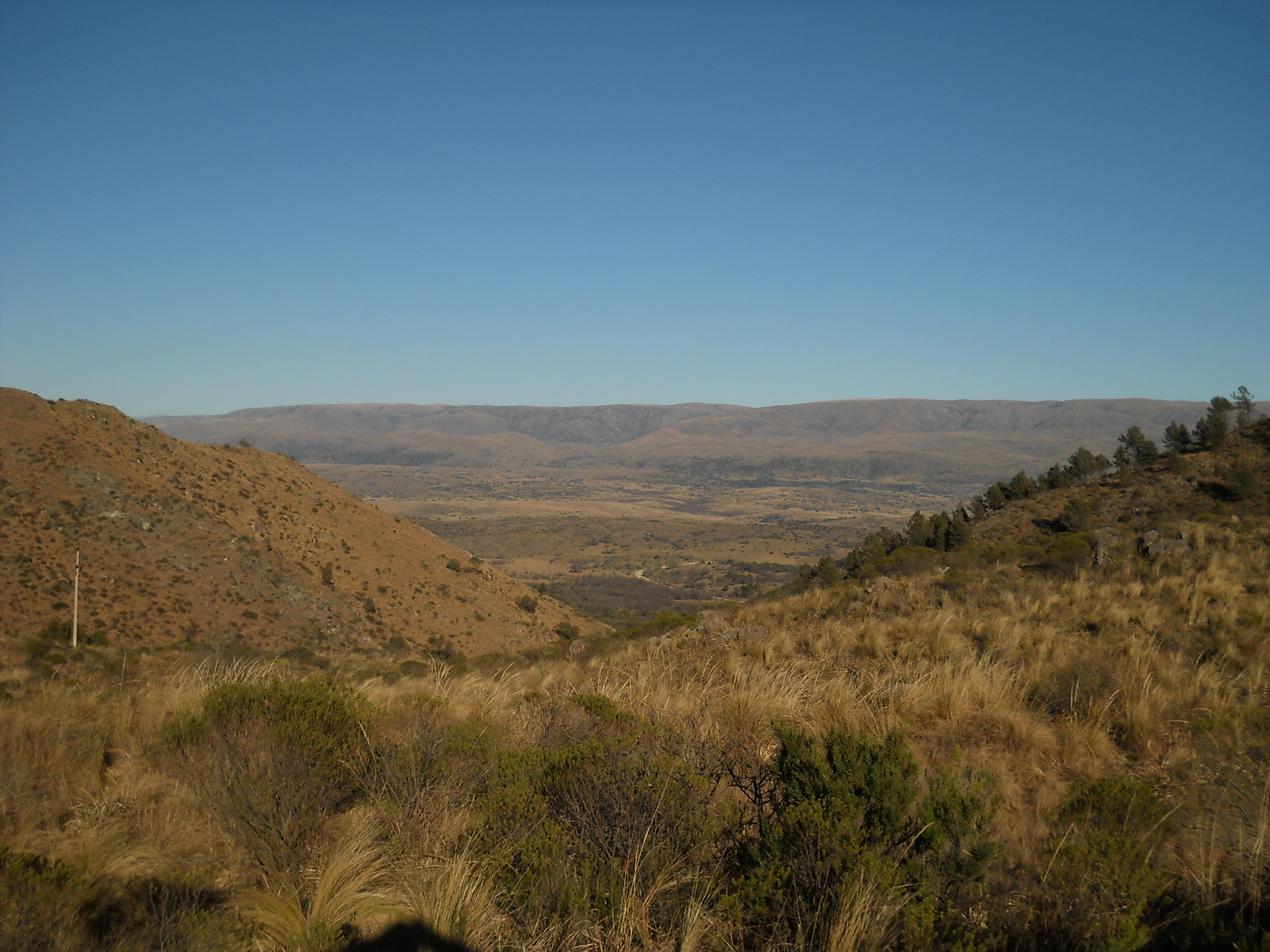
Afar in the center, the quebrada the park is named for

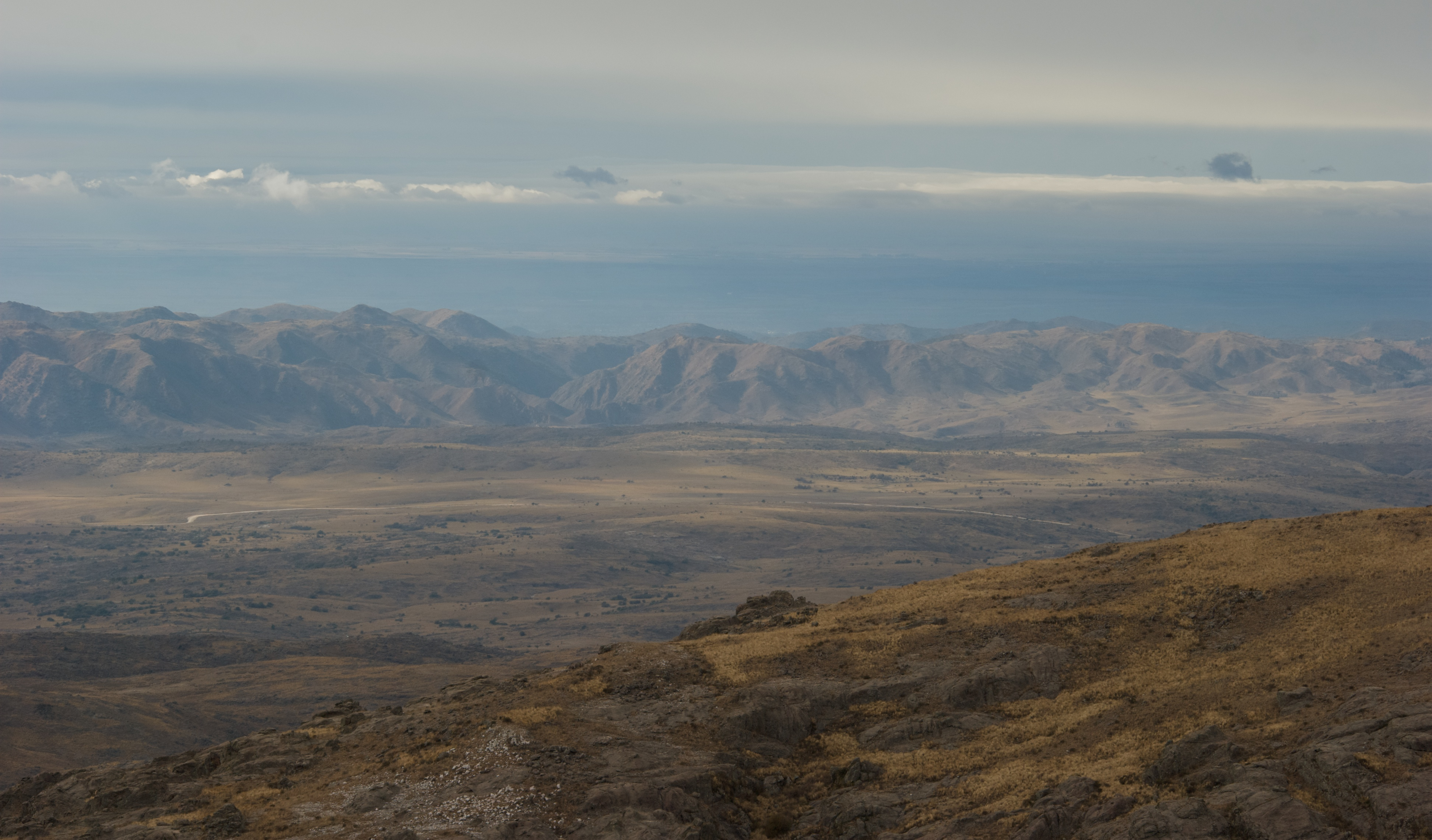
Low hills and grasslands make up most of the park's montes.

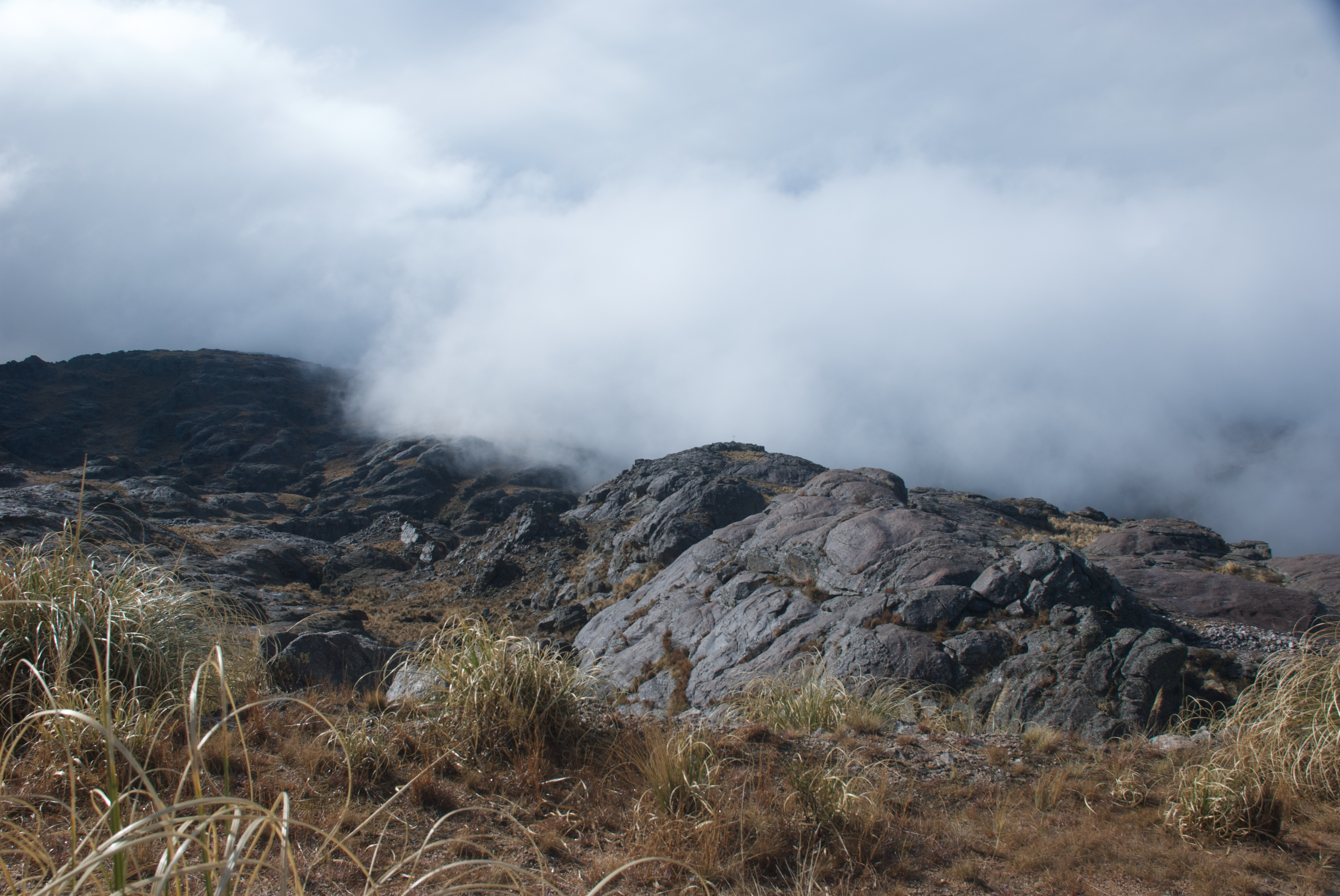
Dense fog covering the shallow valley

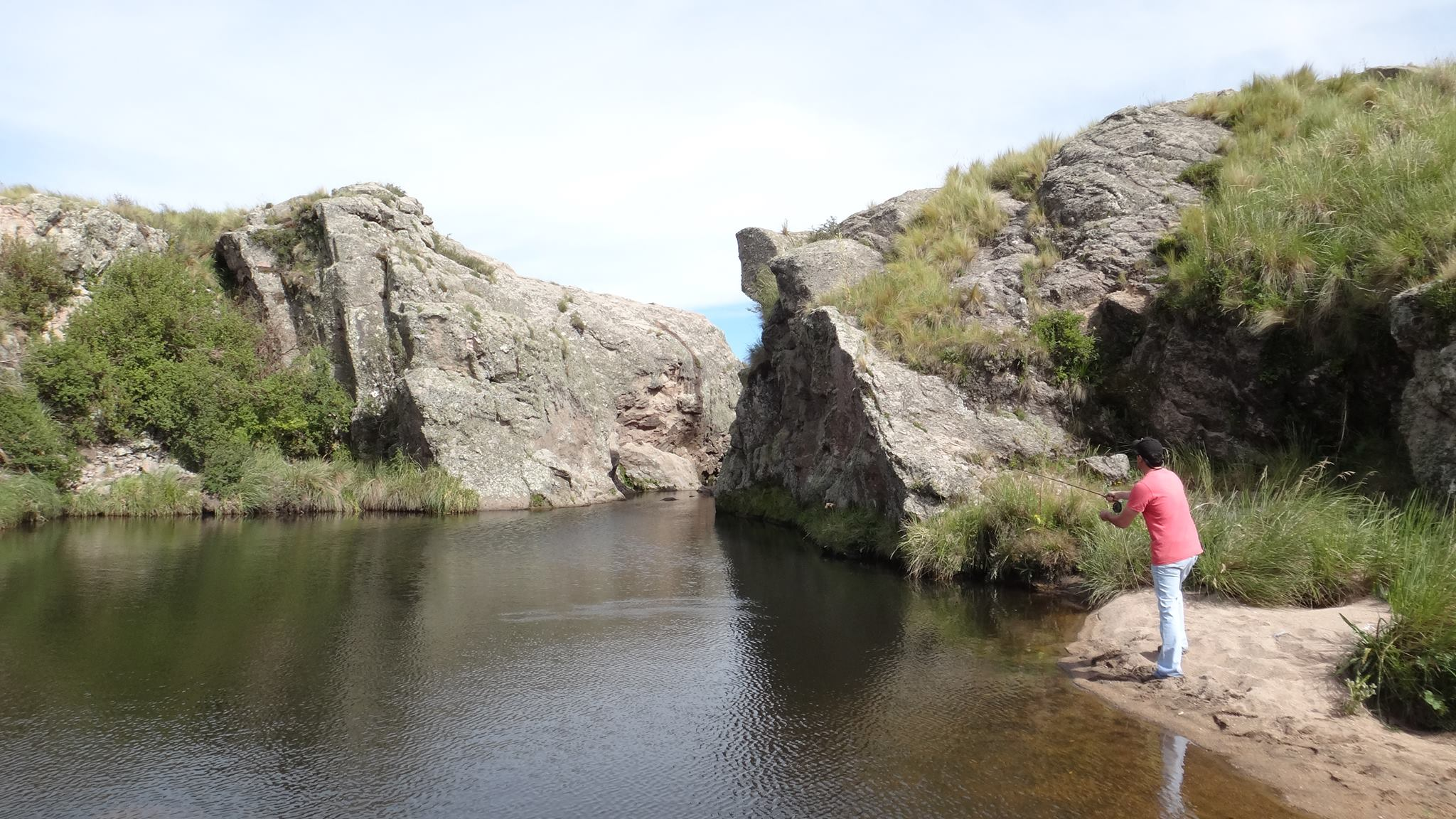
Fly fishing in Quebrada del Condorito

== Biodiversity ==
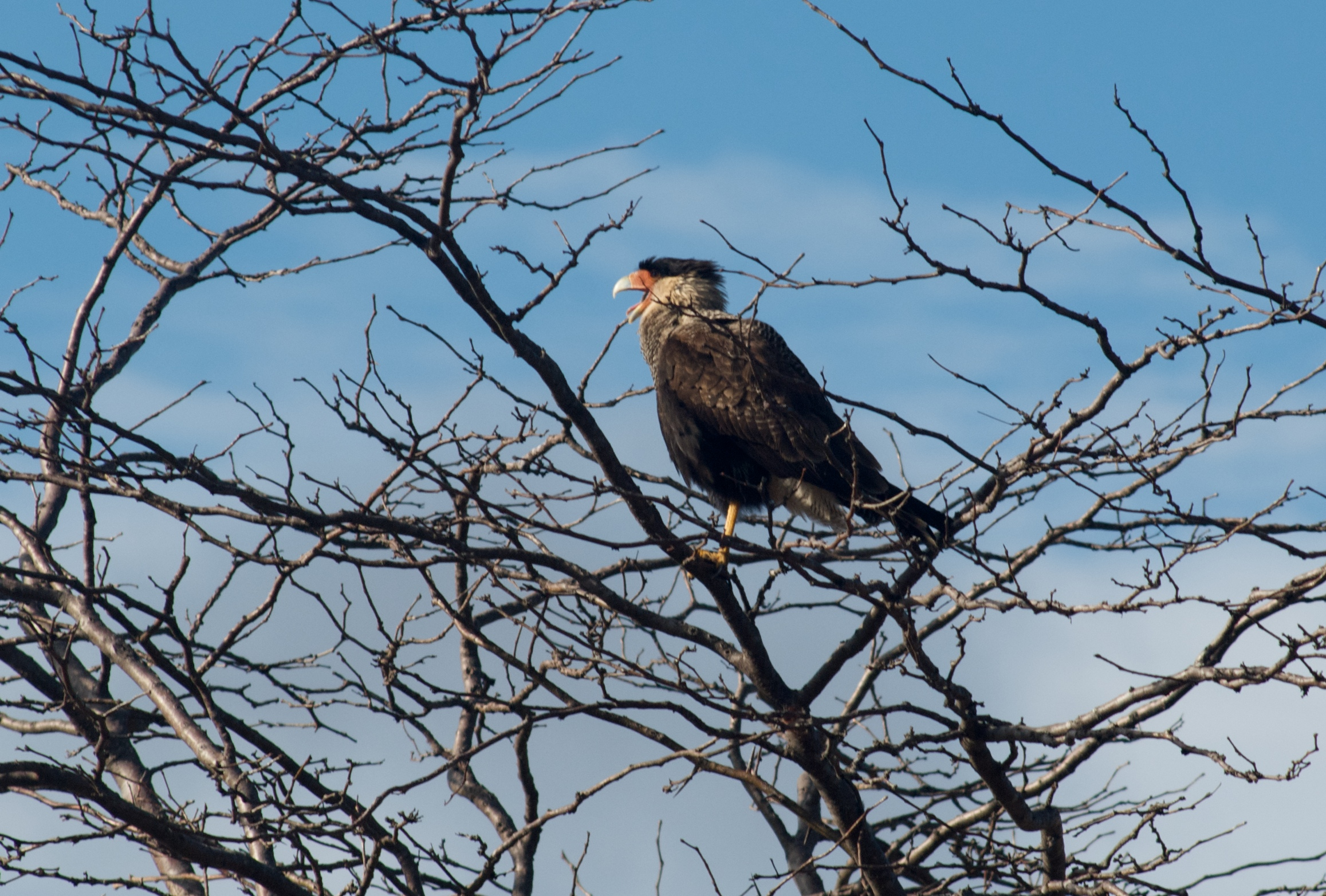
The Carancho, a large bird of prey inhabiting the park.

Quebrada del Condorito lies within the high altitude of the top floor of the Sierras Grandes, which contrasts with the great Pampas' lower plains that surround them. This gives the region characteristics of a biological island, which, depending on climatic variations, is enriched by intermittent flows of Andean and Patagonian wildlife colonization. As a result, the area has a great diversity of endemic species and subspecies, both plants and animals.

The park is an important site for Andean condors watching (the species had undergone a marked population decline during the twentieth century), for which the easternmost distribution is found in this region. Recently developed policies for condor protection, active caring and reintroduction into wildlife have led to a steep recovery of populations where they had been almost extinguished a few years ago.
