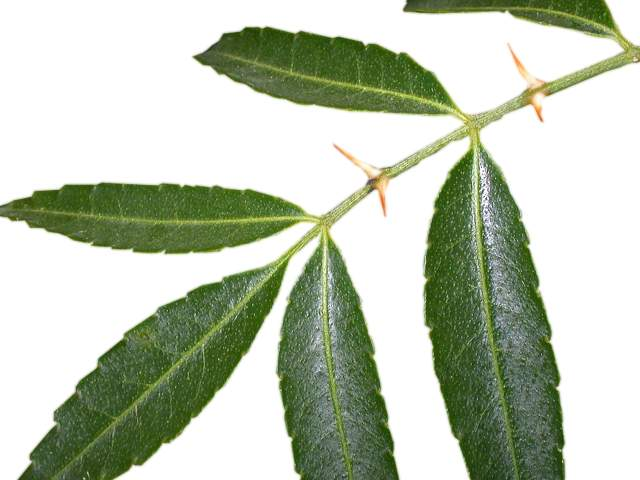

Scientific classification
- Kingdom: Plantae
- Clade: Tracheophytes
- Clade: Angiosperms
- Clade: Eudicots
- Clade: Rosids
- Order: Sapindales
- Family: Rutaceae
- Genus: Zanthoxylum
- Species: Z. coco

Binomial name
- Zanthoxylum coco Gillies ex Hook. & Arn. (1833)

Synonyms
- Fagara coco (Gillies ex Hook. & Arn.) Engl. (1896); Zanthoxylum stipitatum Engl. (1874)

= Zanthoxylum coco =

Species of tree

Zanthoxylum coco (also known as Fagara coco) is an evergreen tree of the family Rutaceae, native to Argentina and Bolivia where it grows in the wild, mostly in spiniferous forests of the low mountain ranges of the western Chaco. It is characteristic of the hill forest of the Sierras Pampeanas.

== Description ==
The coco, also cochucho or smelly sauco, is usually found either in isolated groups or standing alone, from a small to medium-sized tree, ranging from 6 to 8 metres in height. The foliage is abundant, evergreen with imparipinnate leaves that present paired spines presumably in the place of leaflets. Punctations, in pairs, on the leaflets are quite distinctive. Leaves have serrated margins and pinnate venation. Flowers have five petals and are arranged in paniculate inflorescences. The fruit is spherically shaped, dehiscent; containing a shiny blackish seed. The whole plant has a characteristic unpleasant smell, hence the alternative name "smelly sauco".

== Biochemistry ==
Even though unused in the general botanical pharmacopeia, Zanthoxylum coco tissues are very rich in alkaloids. γ-Fagarine, N-methylisocorydine, skimminianine, α-fagarine, fagarine-2, magnoflorine, nitidine, chelerythrine, berberine, palmatine and candicine have been isolated from the foliage and wood.

== Taxon synonym usage ==
The coco belongs to the genus Zanthoxylum. However, most local scientific articles use Fagara as the genus name.
