= Villa Carlos Paz =

- City
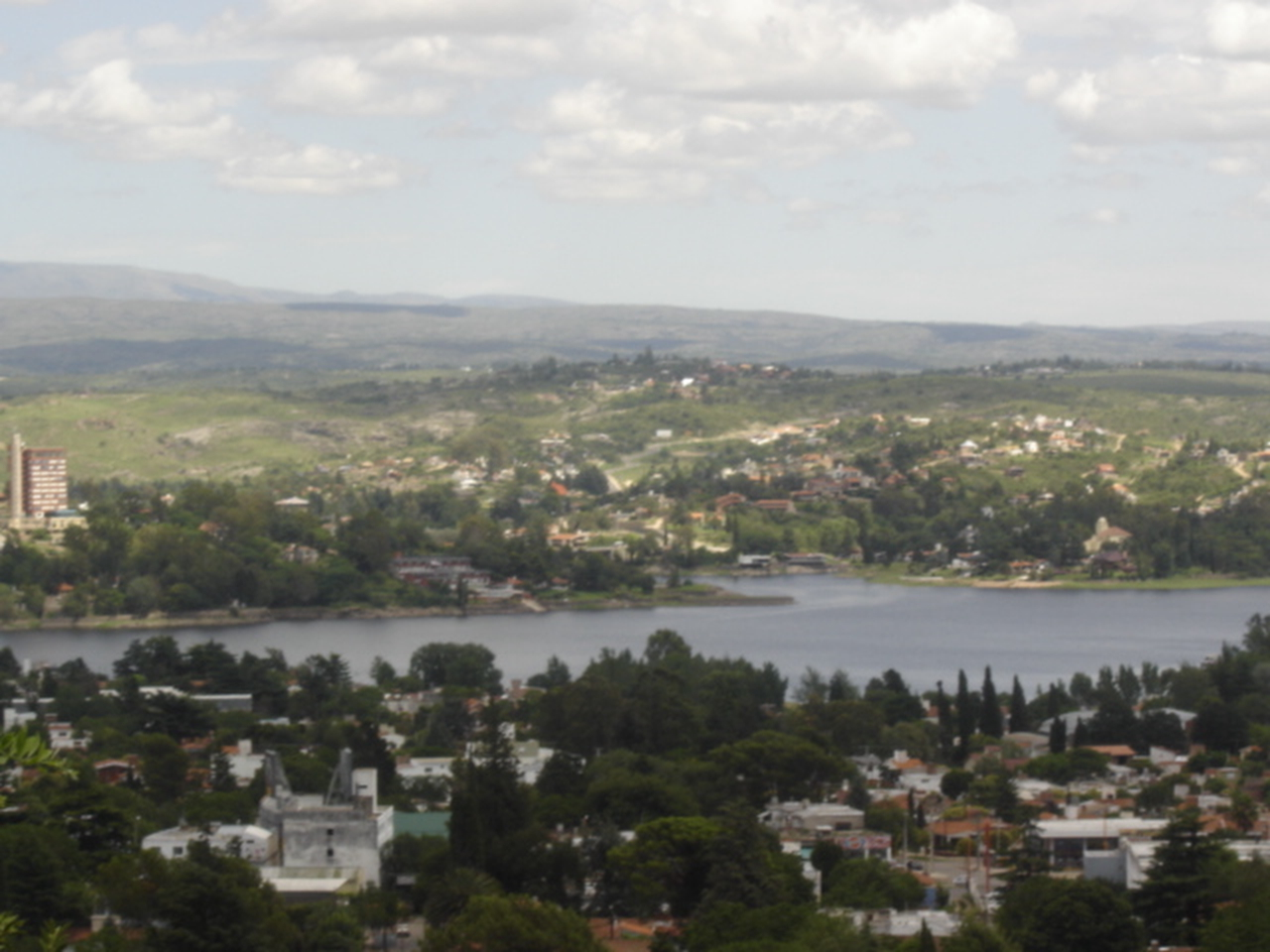
- View of the city from Cerro de la Cruz

- Flag

- Location of Villa Carlos Paz in Argentina
- Coordinates: 31°24′S 64°31′W
- Country: Argentina
- Province: Córdoba
- Department: Punilla
- Founded: July 16, 1913
- Founder: Carlos Nicandro Paz

Government
  - Intendant: Esteban A. Aviles

Area
  - Total: 26.63 km^{2} (10.28 sq mi)
- Elevation: 643 m (2,110 ft)

Population (2010)
  - Total: 75,315
  - Density: 2,828/km^{2} (7,325/sq mi)
- Time zone: UTC−3 (ART)
- CPA base: X5152
- Dialing code: +54 3541
- Website: Official website

Villa Carlos Paz (locally [ˈbiʝa ˈkaɾlos ˈpas]) is a city in the center-north of the province of Córdoba, Argentina, in the south of the Punilla Valley, lying on the western slope of the Sierras Chicas. It has a population of about 56,000 as per the 2001 census [INDEC]. The area of Punilla is a major tourist destination on the national level, and Villa Carlos Paz is in turn the most important city of Punilla, favoured by its closeness (36 km (22 mi)) to the populous Córdoba City, the capital of the province. Popular tourist activities include bathing in one of the many rivers, fishing, evening shows, kite surfing, windsurfing, hiking and mountain biking.

== Geography ==
Villa Carlos Paz is on the southern shore of the San Roque Lake. It is crossed by the San Antonio River and the Los Chorrillos Stream. The city was founded by the rancher Carlos Nicandro Paz in 1913.

The Hanging Bridges Trail was built in 1918 to link the town to the Valley Traslasierra. This was replaced in the 1950s by the Camino de las Altas Cumbres.

== International relations ==
=== Twin towns — Sister cities ===
Villa Carlos Paz is twinned with:

- Tarija, Bolivia
- Termas de Río Hondo, Argentina
- San Bernardino, Paraguay
- Peschiera del Garda, Italy

== Notable events ==
In 2012, an Argentinian dog named Capitán was reported to have sat every evening for six years on his owner's grave. This was compounded by the fact that the family had never brought the dog to the graveyard and the dog had managed to find it himself. The municipal cemetery's director, Héctor Baccega, said that the first time he saw the dog, he arrived at the cemetery alone. The dog then did a couple of laps around the place before finding his master's grave — all on his own. He arrives each day at 6:00 p.m.

The town has been used many times as the base of the Rally Argentina, with the streets of the town being a super special stage in 2010. It was also a stage of the 2015 and 2016 Dakar Rally.

On October 11, 2023, the town was evacuated due to a wildfire threatening the city.
