= Santa María de Punilla =

Coordinates: 31.2611°S 64.4639°W

- Town
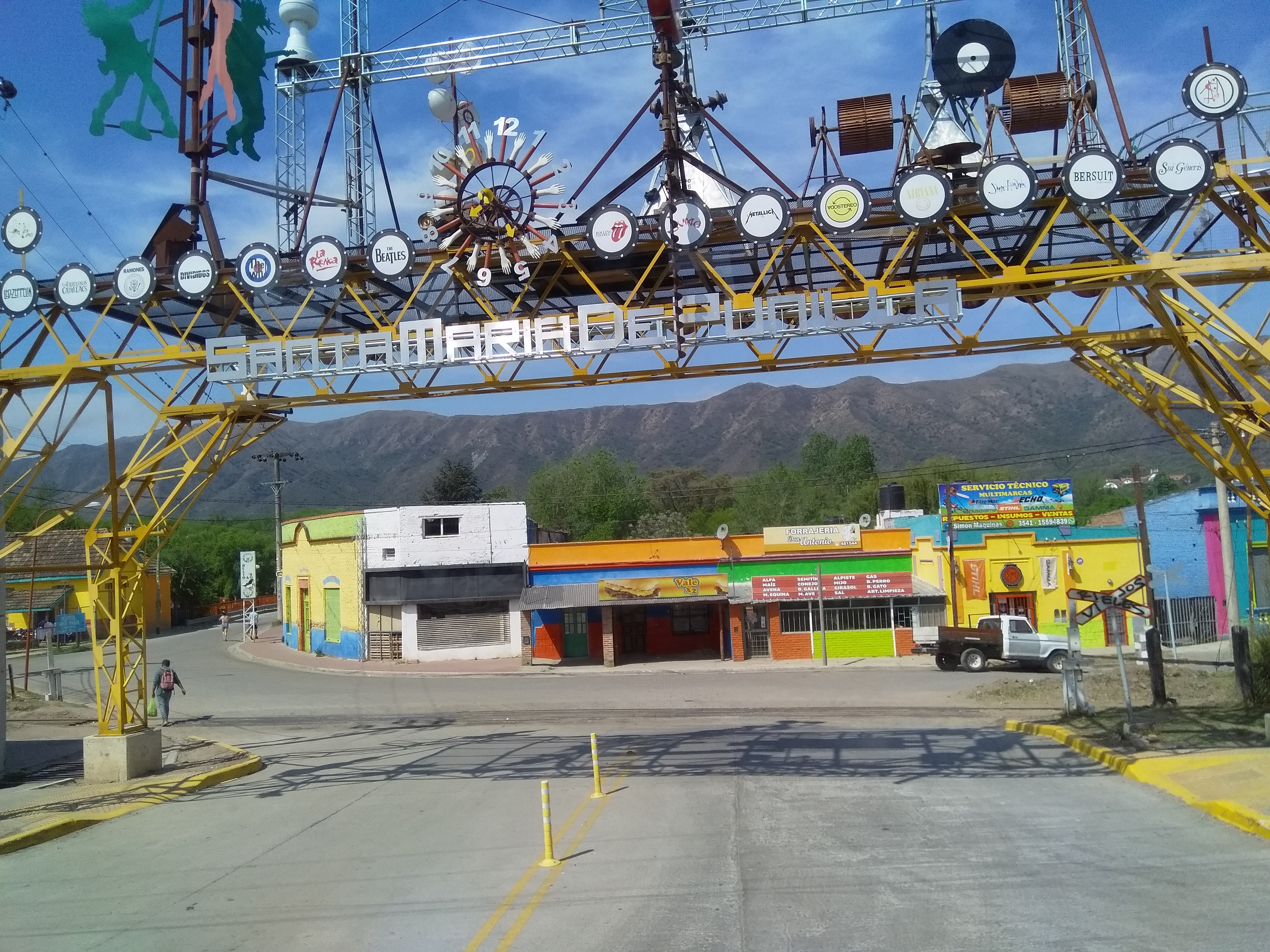
- Entrance to Cosquin Rock, Santa María de Punilla, Córdoba, Argentina from national route 38

- Location within Argentina
- Country: Argentina
- Province: Córdoba
- Department: Punilla
- Foundation: June 25, 1585

Government
  - Intendant: Silvia Rocchietti (UCR)
- Elevation: 654 m (2,146 ft)

Population (2010)
  - Total: 9,526
- Time zone: UTC−3 (ART)
- CPA base: X5164
- Dialing code: 03541
- Website: Official website

Santa Maria de Punilla is a town in the Punilla Department in the province of Córdoba, Argentina. The town has a population of 9,526 inhabitants (INDEC, 2010 ) and is located on National Route 38, and the Tren de las Sierras line of the General Manuel Belgrano Railway. The center of Santa Maria de Punilla is located approximately 50 km northwest of the state's capital city of Córdoba and 3 km south of the city of, Cosquín.

The municipality is also located on the banks of the Cosquín River. Originally, the area belonged to an indigenous Comechingón community known as "Toaén", encompassing what is now Santa Maria, Cosquín, Bialet Massé and neighboring areas.
