= Villa Giardino =

- Town
- Flag

- Location of Villa Giardino in Argentina
- Coordinates: 31°2′S 64°29′W
- Country: Argentina
- Province: Córdoba
- Department: Punilla

Government
  - Intendant: Omar Ferreyra (UCR)

Population
  - Total: 4,679
- Time zone: UTC−3 (ART)
- CPA base: X5176
- Dialing code: +54 3548

Villa Giardino is a town in the province of Córdoba, Argentina. It has 4,679 inhabitants per the 2001 census [INDEC]. It lies about 85 km from the provincial capital Córdoba, on National Route 38, between La Cumbre and La Falda.

Originally populated by Comechingones, Spanish settlers established two important ranches (estancias), called El Molino and Altos de San Pedro. With the arrival of the railroad in the 19th century, the region thrived as a rural area, and also through the exploitation of limestone deposits.

The town takes its name after landowner Juan Giardino, owner of Altos de San Pedro and a main driving force in the urbanization of this small agrarian village.
