= Cosquin =

Cosquin' may refer to

a place

- Cosquín, Córdoba, a small town in Argentina

a festival

- Cosquín Festival

a river

- Cosquín River

a surname

- Emmanuel Cosquin (1841 – 1919), French folklorist.
