= Luis Huergo =

Luis Augusto Huergo
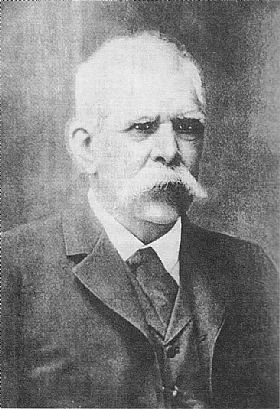
- Elderly Huergo.
- Born: November 1, 1837; Buenos Aires, Argentina
- Died: November 4, 1913 (aged 76)
- Education: Civil engineering, University of Buenos Aires

Luis Augusto Huergo (November 1, 1837 – November 4, 1913) was an Argentine engineer prominent in the development of his country's ports.

== Life and times ==
=== Early career ===
Luis Huergo was born in Buenos Aires, in 1837, to a family of prosperous retailers. He was sent to the Jesuit Mount St. Mary's University previously known as Mount St. Mary's College, where he obtained his secondary education from 1852 to 1857. Returning to Argentina, he assisted urbanist Pedro Benoit plan the first road to Ensenada (a harbor town 56 km (35 mi) south of Buenos Aires) and earned a degree as a surveyor from the Topography and Geodesics School of Buenos Aires, in 1862. Huergo was among the first class to enroll at the School of Engineering created by the Rector of the University of Buenos Aires, Juan María Gutiérrez, in 1866, and four years later, his thesis on the value of roads earned him the school's first engineering degree.

Huergo designed flood control projects for the torrential Tercero River and other Córdoba Province waterways. He also designed 120 railroad bridges during his early career, as well as the harbor of the city of San Fernando. Huergo co-founded the Argentine Scientific Society in 1872 and the Argentine Geographic Institute, in 1879. He taught at the newly created School of Mathematics of the University of Buenos Aires from 1874, and was designated its dean in 1881.

=== The port ===
Huergo's plans to build a house at the mouth of the Riachuelo River flowing along Buenos Aires' industrial southside earned him the appointment of Director of the Riachuelo Works Bureau in 1876. This powerful post enabled him to develop the Port of La Boca, the first modern port in Buenos Aires. The port's opening in 1880 coincided with a sudden economic boom in Argentina, and the Provincial Legislature awarded him a generous budget for improvements, including a breakwater and the dredging of the silty Riachuelo mouth to 6.5 m (21 ft). His ambitious proposal for a massive, new port north of the one at La Boca received initial support in the Argentine Congress, though the backing of Argentina's main financier (Barings Bank) for a proposal put forth by local import-export mogul Eduardo Madero helped sway congre ssional support away from Huergo's proposal. Madero's project was approved by Congress in 1882.

Huergo appealed the decision on the grounds that it would be uneconomical to build and difficult to modify, once new, larger freighters began to arrive. Madero's project was signed into law by President Julio Roca in 1884, however, and in 1886, Huergo resigned his post at the Riachuelo Bureau.

=== New projects and a new port ===
Huergo continued to campaign against the costly Puerto Madero works in his capacity as Dean of the School of Exact Sciences at Buenos Aires, while also accepting new projects. Returning to Córdoba Province, he designed San Roque Reservoir in 1888 as a means to prevent flooding along the Suquia and Cosquín Rivers. He was appointed Minister of Public Works for the important Province of Buenos Aires and designed Puerto Belgrano, the Argentine Navy's first deep-water port. Huergo designed a canal from the city of Córdoba to the Paraná River, over 320 km (200 mi) to the east, and the Port of Asunción, Paraguay.

The accomplished engineer was named director of the oil field discovered at Comodoro Rivadavia, in 1907. The nation's first such discovery, the office served as a precursor to YPF, the state oil concern established in 1922. Another reflection of the booming Argentine economy of the time, maritime shipping, had increased dramatically since Huergo's proposal for the Port of Buenos Aires had been passed over in 1882. The tonnage of vessels arriving at the port jumped from 4 million to 20 million by 1907, and in September of that year, Congress approved the construction of a new port. The facility would be built north of Madero's nearly-obsolete docks, and the design would be Huergo's. Work started in 1911 on the massive, new port, which included six open inner harbors, separated by cargo piers and protected by two breakwaters.

Luis Huergo did not live to see the new port's completion, and he died in 1913, at age 76. His port design solved the very limitations he had anticipated for the former facility, and his many and early contributions to his country's infrastructure made him Argentina's "first engineer."
