= La Falda =

- Town
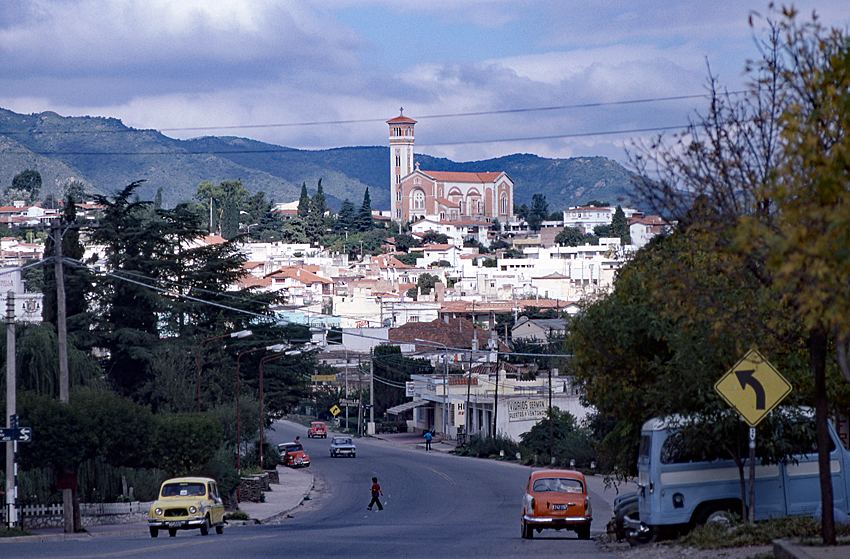
- La Falda, Cordoba Province

- Flag

- Location of La Falda in Argentina
- Coordinates: 31°5′S 64°30′W
- Country: Argentina
- Province: Córdoba
- Department: Punilla

Government
  - Intendant: Javier Dieminger (UCR)
- Elevation: 934 m (3,064 ft)

Population (2012)
  - Total: 36,202
- Time zone: UTC−3 (ART)
- CPA base: X5172
- Dialing code: +54 3548
- Website: Official website

La Falda is a town in the province of Córdoba, Argentina, located 79 km (49 mi) from Córdoba and 800 km from Buenos Aires. It had about 15,000 inhabitants at the 2001 census [INDEC].

La Falda lies at the foot of two small mountains (Cerro El Cuadrado and Cerro La Banderita), and it is part of an important tourist circuit of the province (the Punilla Valley). The Punilla Department includes other tourist sites like Villa Carlos Paz, Los Cocos, La Cumbre and Capilla del Monte.

La Falda is home to the historic "Eden Hotel", now a public park and historic museum, which was visited by Albert Einstein.

The main street and hub of activity for the town is "Avenue Eden".

== Main sights ==
Attractions in La Falda include the 7 Cascades, a natural park which also hosts a large public swimming pool. "El Silencio" is a colonial castle of the 17th century featuring fishing and observation of trout; it is situated some 10 km (6.2 mi) from La Falda downtown. "Tatu Carreta" is an Ecological Park and Zoo c. 8 km from the downtown on the route toward Córdoba. It is a drive thru "safari" style zoological experience with local and exotic animal species. The area has been used as a special stage for Rally Argentina.

== Gallery ==
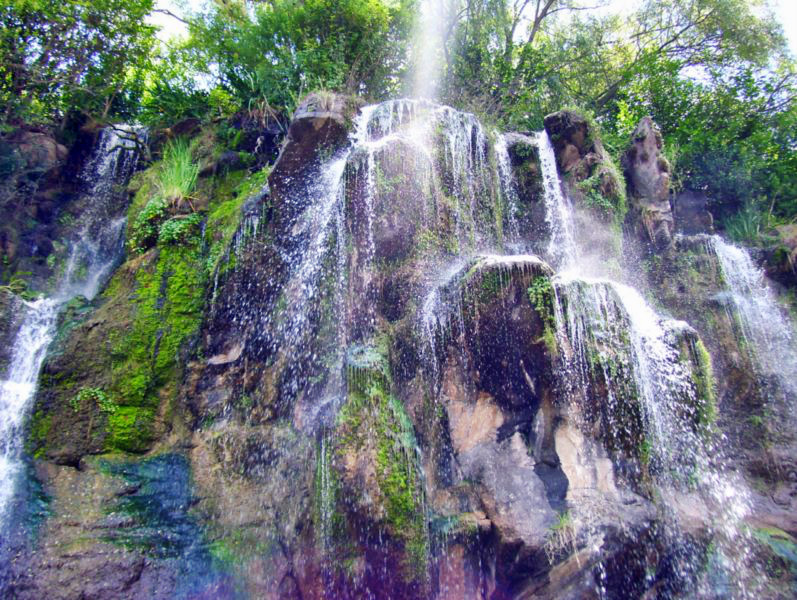
7 Cascadas, La Falda

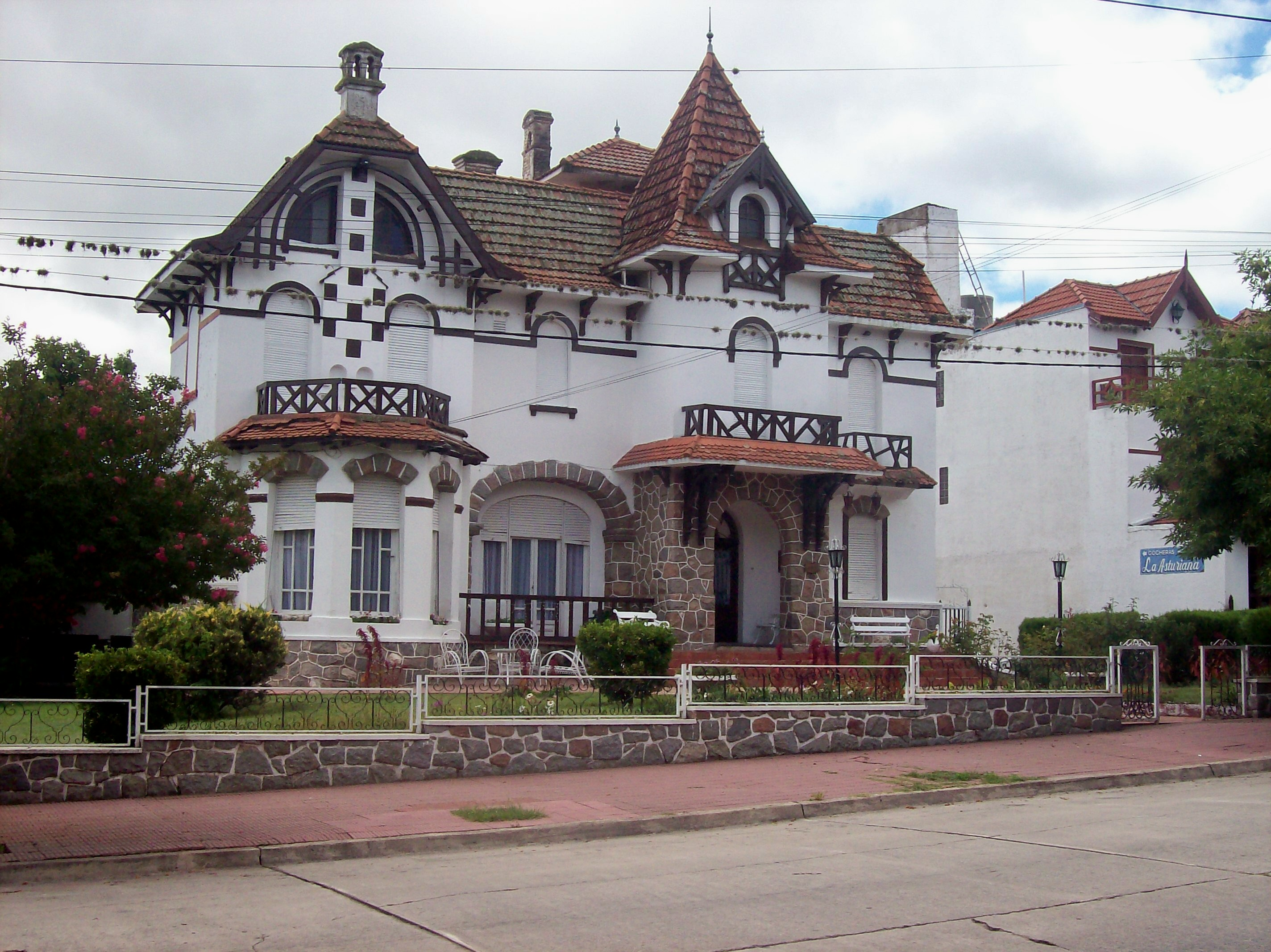
The Asturian Hotel

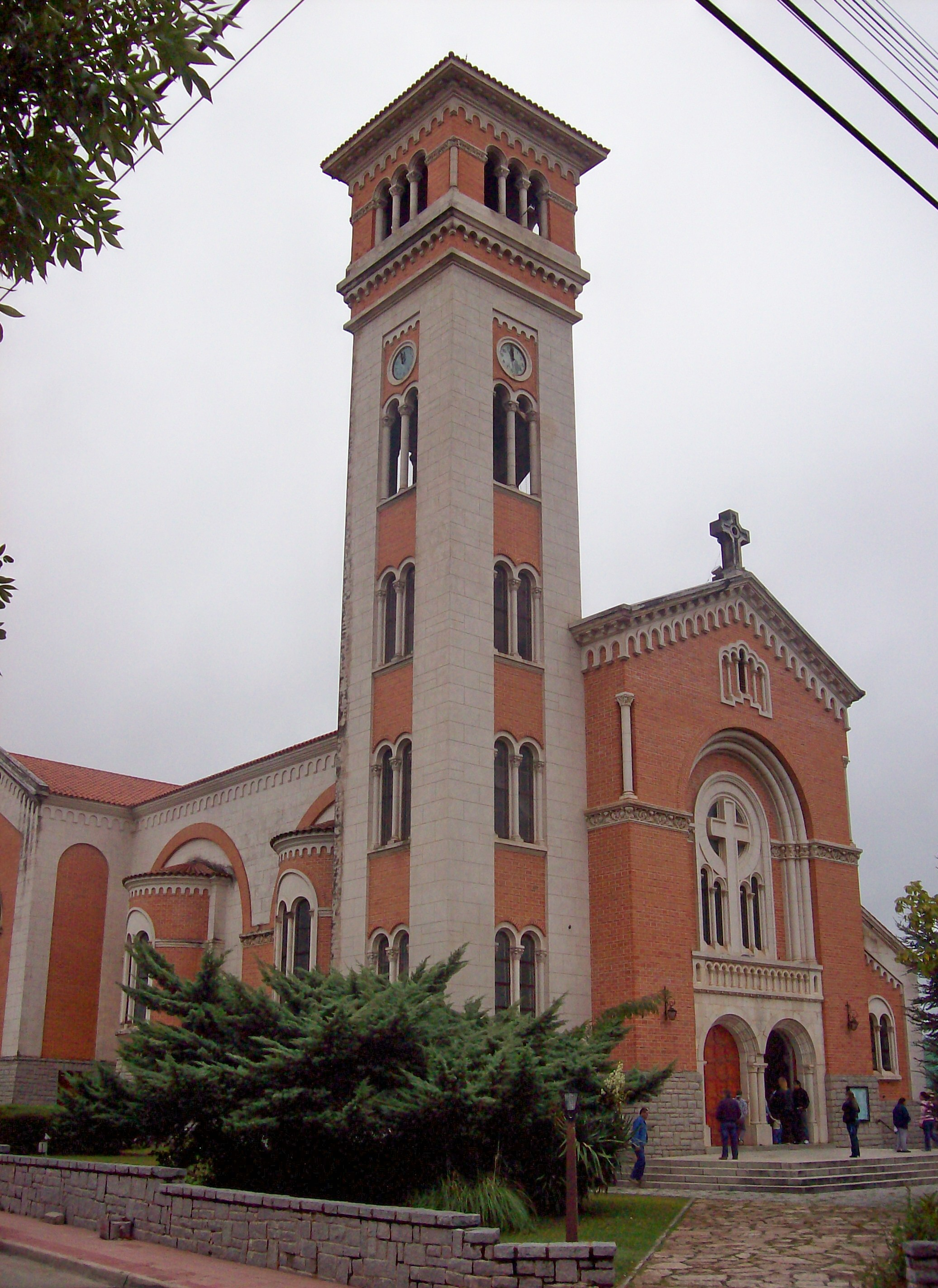
The local parish church
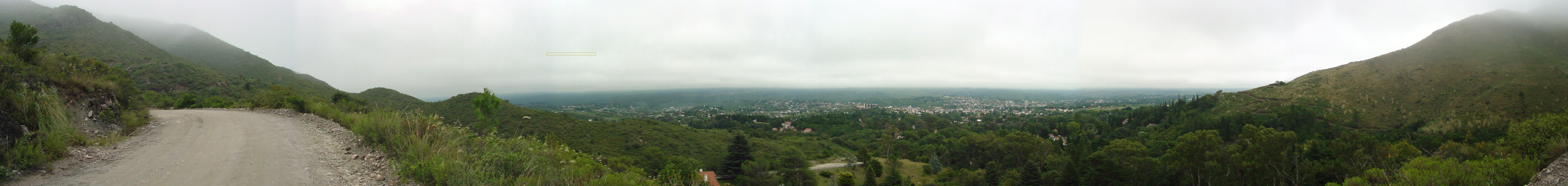
View from dirt road above Eden Hotel

== Notable people ==
Notable people that were born or lived in La Falda include the following:

- Voldemar Mettus (1894–1975), Estonian journalist, writer, and translator

== See also ==
- List of largest cuckoo clocks
