= Tanti, Córdoba =

Tanti
- Town
- Location of Tanti in Argentina
- Coordinates: 31°20′S 64°36′W
- Country: Argentina
- Province: Córdoba
- Department: Punilla

Government
  - Intendant: Emiliano Paredes (UCR)
- Elevation: 865 m (2,838 ft)

Population
  - Total: 4,579
- Time zone: UTC−3 (ART)
- CPA base: X5155
- Dialing code: +54 3541

Tanti is a town in the province of Córdoba, Argentina, located on the west of the Punilla Valley, about 50 km from the provincial capital Córdoba. It has 4,579 inhabitants as per the 2001 census [INDEC]. Like most of the many small towns scattered in the valley, it is a touristic area, with natural attractions such as hills and streams, as well as historical colonial buildings and pre-Columbian ruins.

The town was officially founded on 23 March 1848, upon the construction of a chapel dedicated to Our Lady of the Rosary. However, populated settlements existed in the area since the 16th century. At the time the region was a ranch (estancia) known as Merced de Quisquizacate. In the second half of the 17th century Juan Liendo acquired the lands and employed them for three ranches: Santa Ana, Tanti and Tanticuchu. They produced mules for the Peruvian market.

== Los Chorrillos ==
Los Chorrilos is a 110 m (360 ft) waterfall near the town.

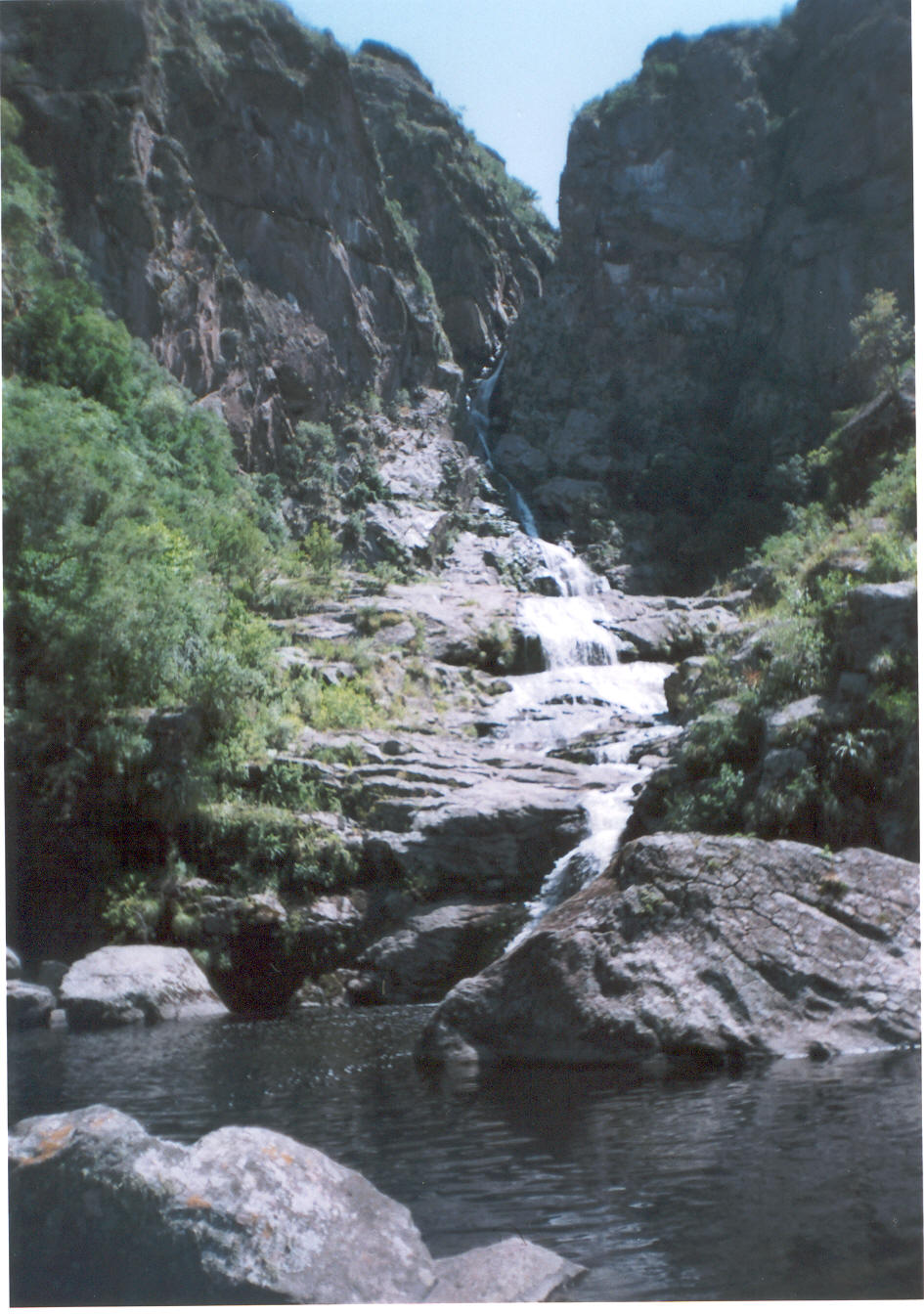
Los Chorrillos

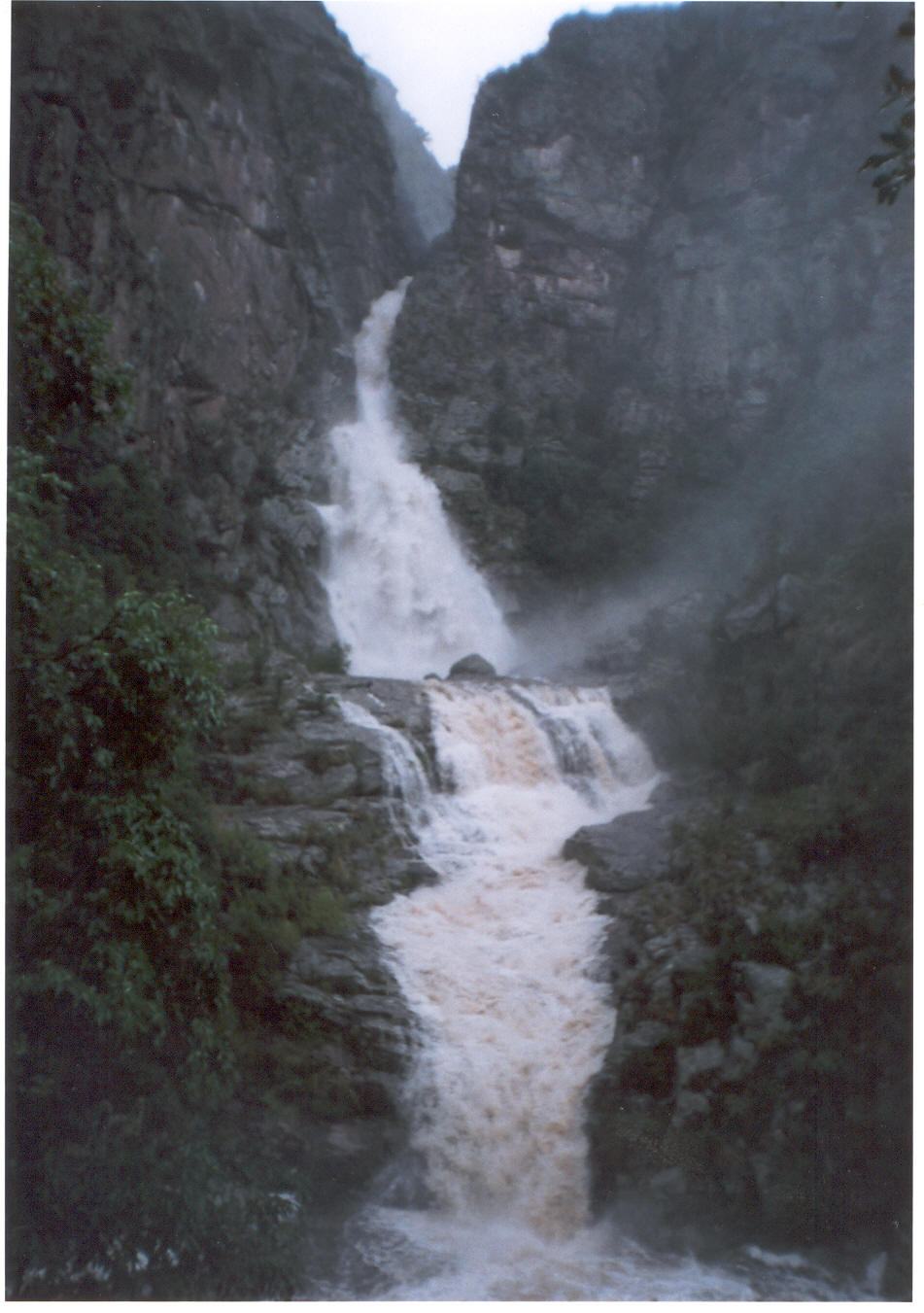
Los Chorrillos in a swollen state

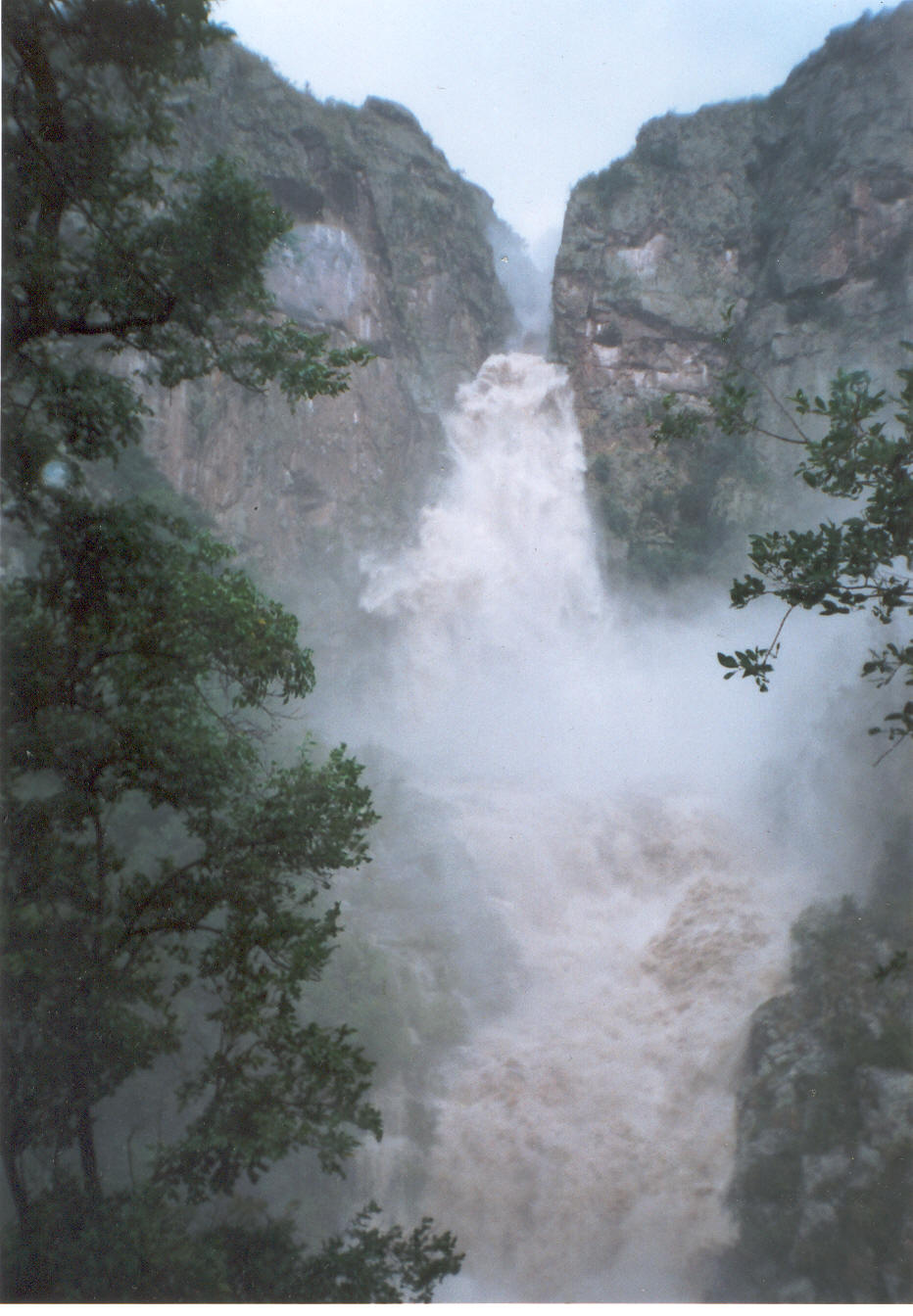
Los Chorrillos in a very swollen state
