= Punilla Valley =

Fluvial valley in Córdoba, Argentina

Coordinates: 31°02′S 64°30′W

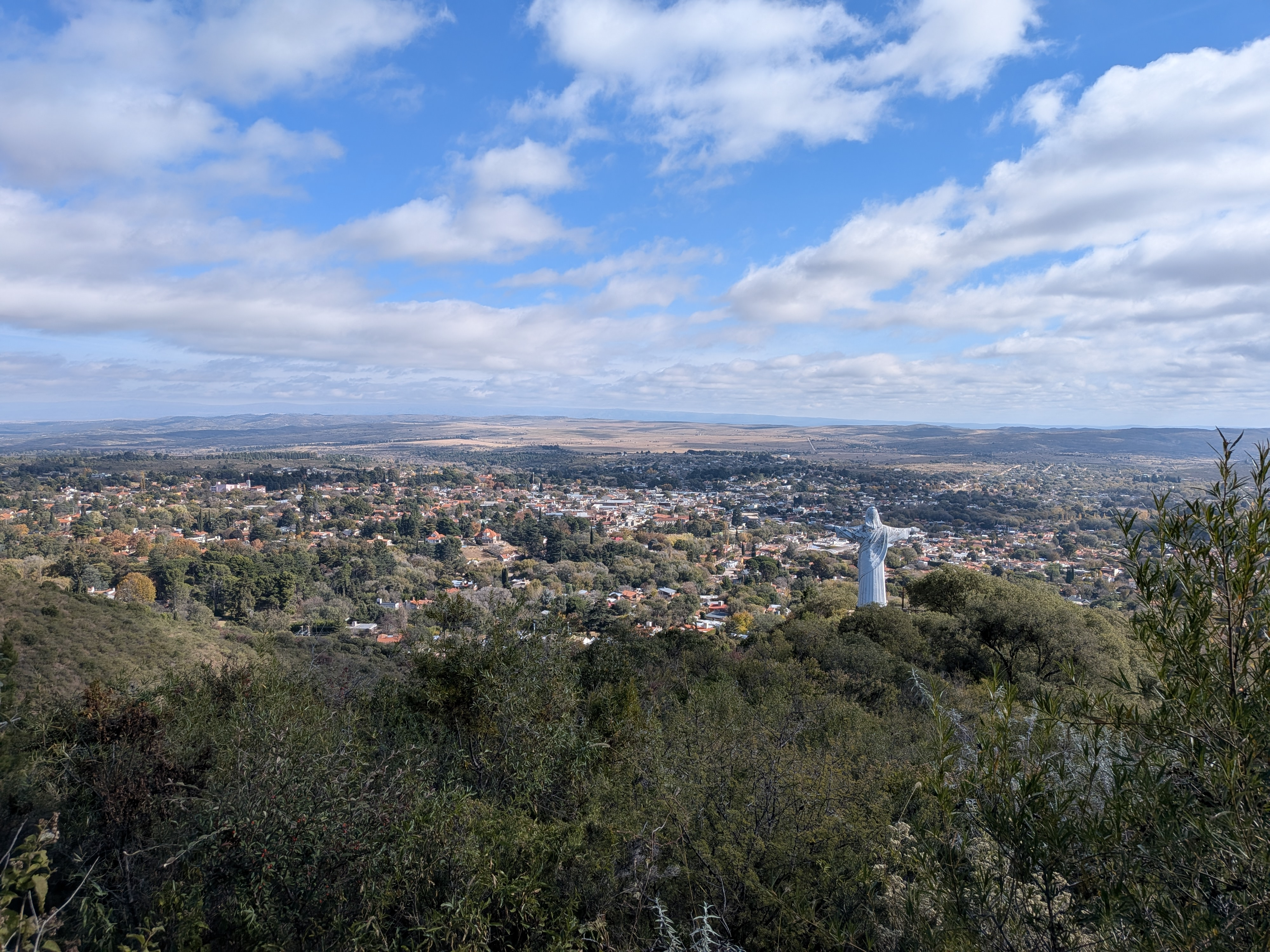
- The view over the valley from La Cumbre
- Interactive map of Punilla Valley

The Punilla Valley (Spanish: Valle de Punilla) is a broad fluvial valley in the province of Córdoba, Argentina. It is located in the center-northwest of the province, bordered by the Sierras Chicas in the east and the Sierras Grandes and the Pampa Achala in the west, oriented from north to south. Administratively, it belongs to the Punilla Department.

== Name ==
The origin of the name Punilla is uncertain. One most widely accepted theory is that the name comes from the Stipa ichu grass that is common to the location and was called "punilla". Another, less-widely accepted theory assumes that the name might relate to "puna", the name for the altitude sickness that travelers on their way to the Andes in the northern provinces would experience.

== Geography ==
Located between the Cordobés Sierras, the valley is bordered by mountains to the east and west, including the Cerro Uritoco, the highest peak of the Sierras Chicas.

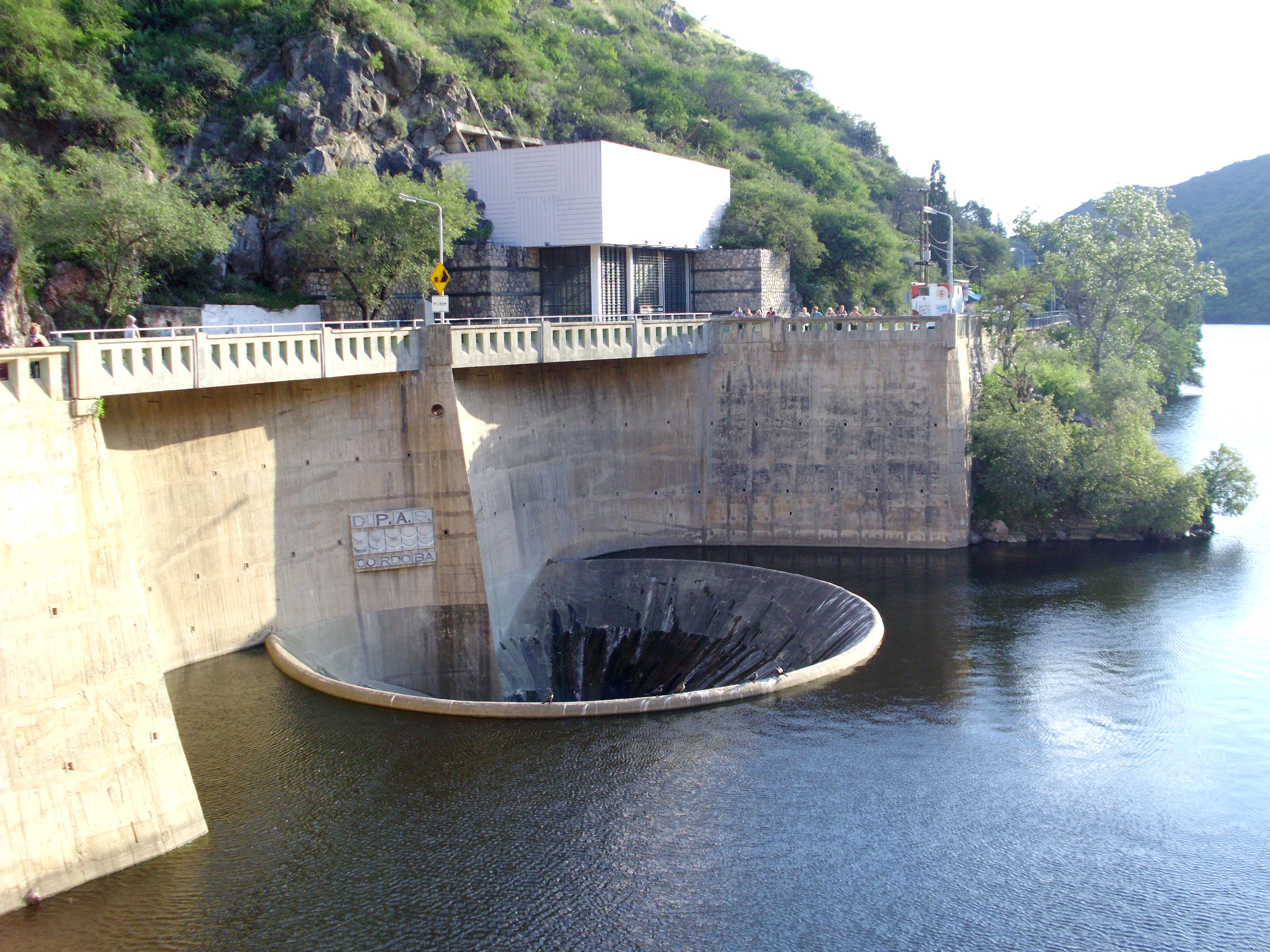
The funnel weir of the San Roque dam

In the southern part of the valley lies the San Roque Lake, an artificial reservoir fed mainly by the San Antonio River and the Cosquín River.

In addition to the San Roque Lake, the valley includes a number of further dams and water reservoirs: The Cruz del Eje and La Falda Reservoirs were completed within the valley in 1943 and 1980, respectively, to address the area's water and flood control needs, and have since become important recreational areas in their own right. The Dique San Jeronimo, close to La Cumbre, was the first arch dam in South America when it was finished in 1941.

== Locations ==
Many of the important tourist destinations of Córdoba are located in the valley, including the city of Villa Carlos Paz on the southern shore of the San Roque lake, Cruz del Eje, Capilla del Monte, La Cumbre, La Falda, Valle Hermoso, and Cosquín.

== Gallery ==
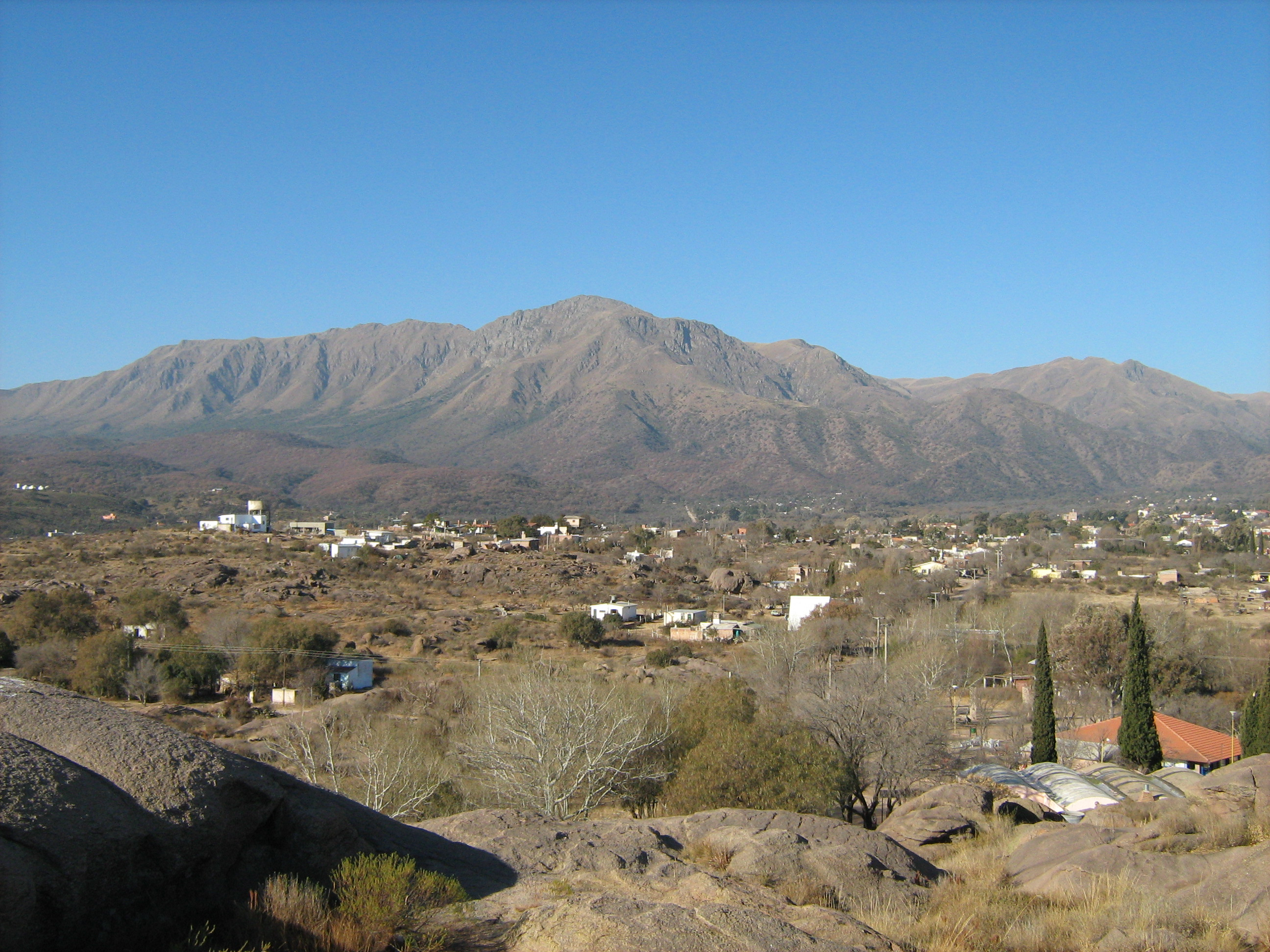
Mount Uritoco

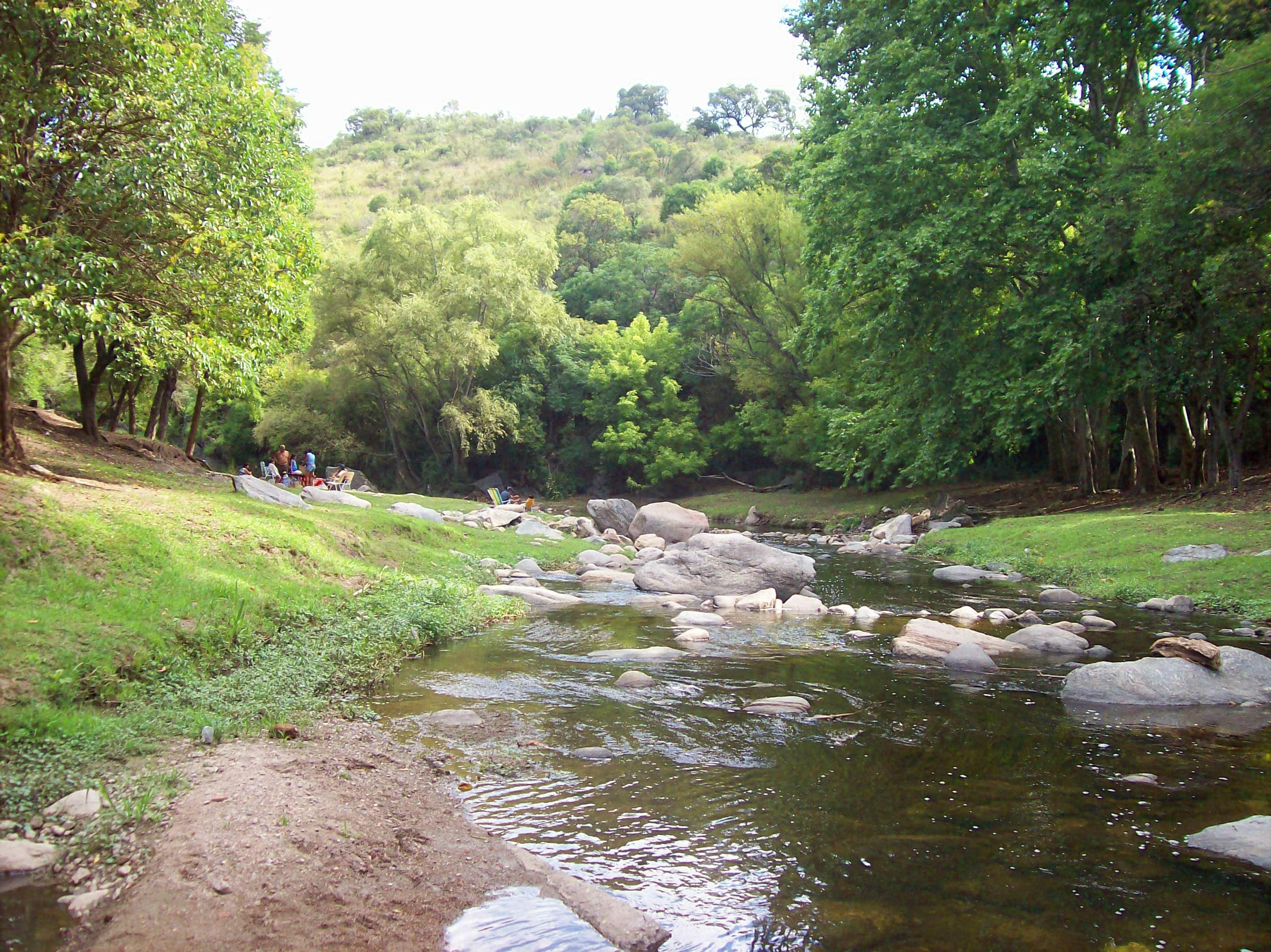
Yacoana Springs, San Francisco River

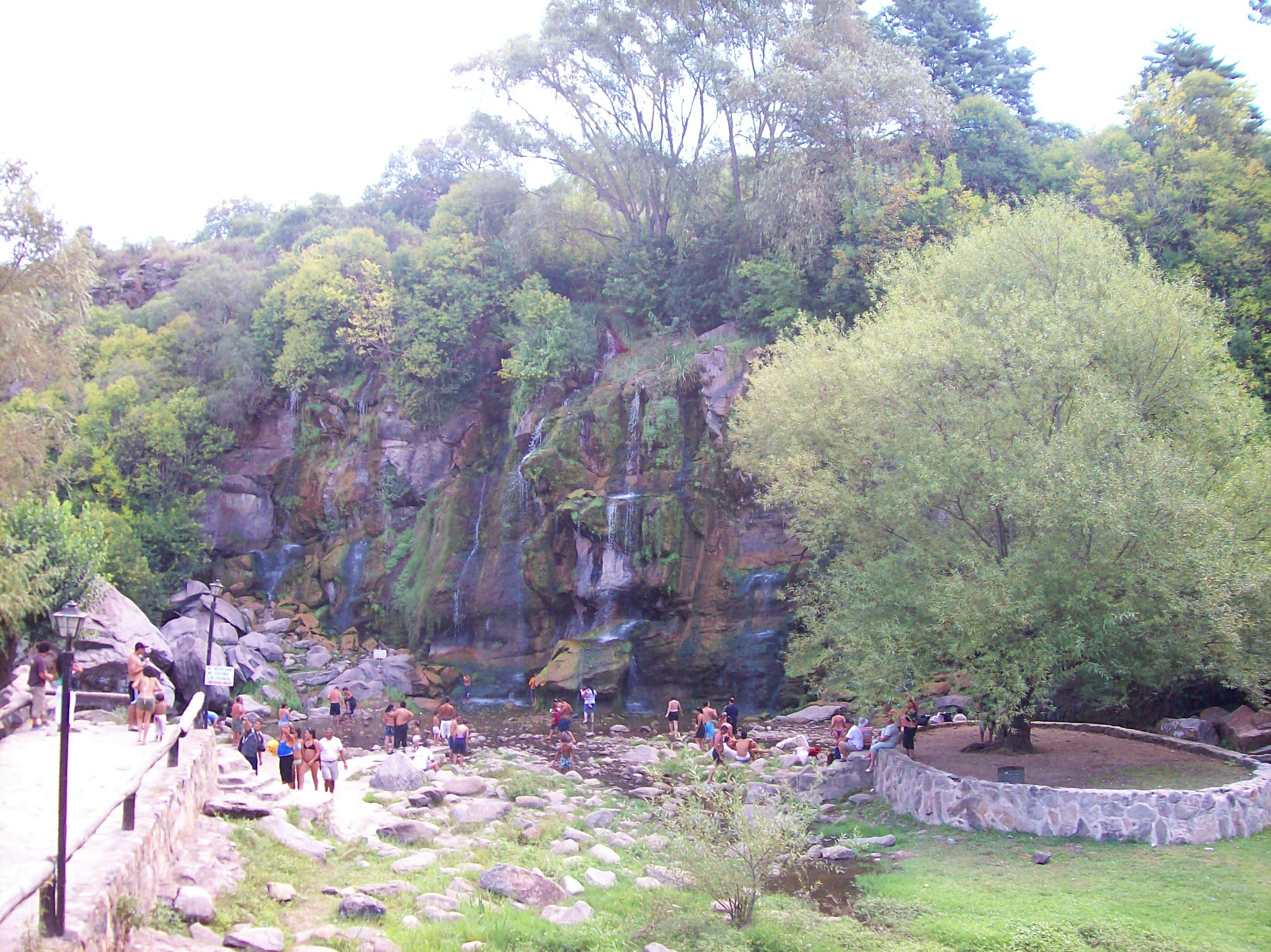
The Seven Falls Springs, near La Falda

== See also ==
- Punilla Department
