= Punilla Department =

Punilla Department Departamento Punilla
- Department
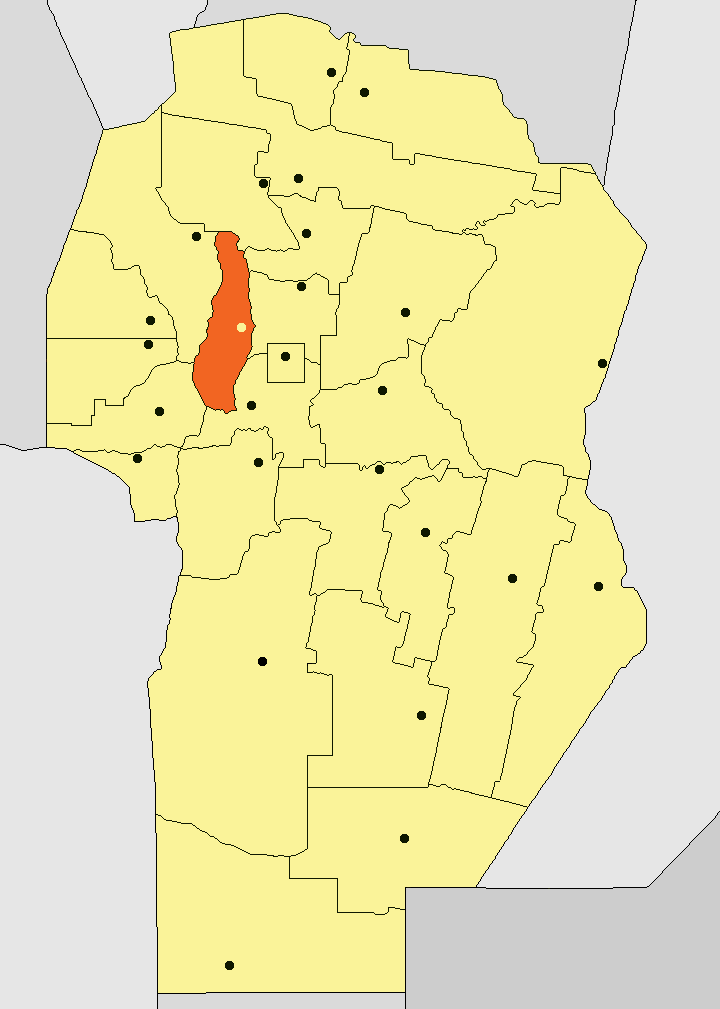
- Location of Punilla Department in Córdoba Province
- Coordinates: 31°15′S 64°27′W
- Country: Argentina
- Province: Córdoba
- Capital: Cosquín

Area
  - Total: 2,592 km^{2} (1,001 sq mi)

Population (2022 census [INDEC])
  - Total: 173,606
  - Density: 66.98/km^{2} (173.5/sq mi)
  - Pop. change (2010-2022): +24%
- Time zone: UTC-3 (ART)
- Postal code: X5166
- Dialing code: 03541
- Distances to
- Buenos Aires: 773 km (480 mi)
- Córdoba: 62 km (39 mi)

The Punilla Department is an administrative division of the province of Córdoba, Argentina. It covers large parts of the name-giving Punilla valley and is located west of the provincial capital Córdoba. In 2022, the department had over 173,000 inhabitants, with a population density of almost 90 inhabitants/km^{2}.

== Geography ==
The department is located between the two mountain ranges of the Sierras de Córdoba, the Sierras Grandes to the west, and the Sierras Chicas to the east. The department is crossed in a north-south direction by national road RN38, which connects the department with Córdoba, Cruz del Eje and further north the province of La Rioja.

== History ==
Prior to the Spanish conquest, the area was inhabited by the Comechingones.

The population of the department grew towards the end of the 19th and early 20th century, when the Argentine railway network reached it, leading to an increase in tourism and health institutions like tuberculosis sanatoriums.

== Population ==
The population of the department has steadily increased since the first census in 1869, reaching 221,273 inhabitants in 2022.

== Economy ==
Tourism is one of the main and growing branches of the local economy, including the production and sale of regional food varieties such as Cordobés alfajores.

Compared to other departments in the province, the raising of livestock plays a minor role in the local economy.

== Tourism ==
The department includes a number of national and international tourist attractions, like the city of Villa Carlos Paz with its lake, the cities of Capilla del Monte, La Cumbre and La Falda in the mountains. With Cerro Uritorco, it also includes the highest peak of the Sierras Chicas with hiking trails. The rivers of the department offer beaches and balnearios, and more active tourism options like para gliding, horseback riding and biking.

The city of Cosquín is home to two annual festivals that attract large numbers of visitors: The Cosquín Festival for folk music, which started in 1961, and Cosquín Rock, which takes place since 2001.

== Settlements ==
- Bialet Massé
- Cabalango
- Capilla del Monte
- Casa Grande
- Charbonier
- Cosquín
- Cuesta Blanca
- Estancia Vieja
- Huerta Grande
- La Cumbre
- La Falda
- Los Cocos
- Mayu Sumaj
- San Antonio de Arredondo
- San Esteban
- San Roque
- Santa María
- Tala Huasi
- Tanti
- Valle Hermoso
- Villa Carlos Paz
- Villa Flor Serrana
- Villa Giardino
- Villa Parque Siquiman
- Villa Santa Cruz del Lago
- Villa Icho Cruz

== See also ==
- Punilla Valley
- Cerro Uritorco
