= Port of Buenos Aires =

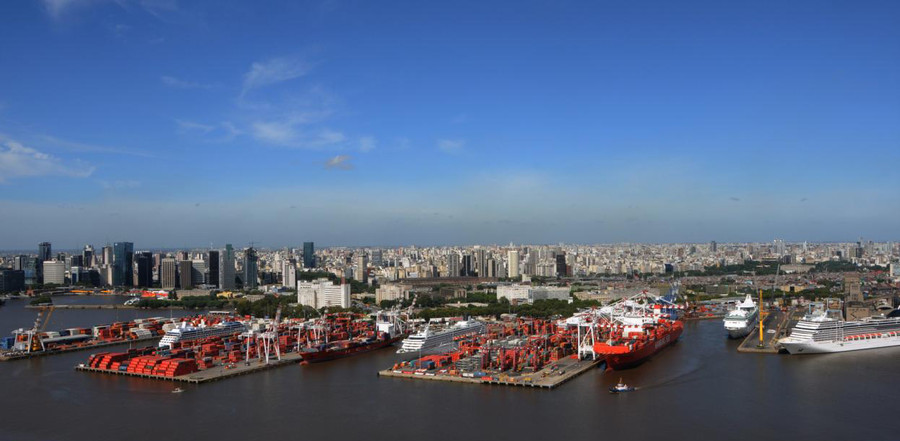
- View of Puerto Nuevo (lit. 'new port'). Located in the neighborhood of Retiro, it is the official port of Buenos Aires since 1928, when it replaced Puerto Madero.
- Interactive map of Port of Buenos Aires
- Location in Argentina

Location
- Country: Argentina
- Location: Puerto Madero, Buenos Aires; Retiro, Buenos Aires; Dock Sud, Buenos Aires Province
- Coordinates: 34°35′S 58°22′W (Puerto Nuevo)
- UN/LOCODE: ARBUE

Details
- Opened: 1897 (Puerto Madero); 1890 (Dock Sud); 1928 (Puerto Nuevo)
- Land area: 91 ha (220 acres)
- No. of berths: 51
- Draft depth: 10.7 m.
- Interventor: Oscar Vecslir
- Secretary General: Dr. Carlos Ferrari

Statistics
- Vessel arrivals: 1,900 (2010)
- Annual cargo tonnage: 11.7 million metric revenue tons (2010)
- Annual container volume: 1.1 million TEU (2010)
- Passenger traffic: 336,000 passengers (2010)
- Annual revenue: US$53 million (2008)
- Net income: US$0.6 million (2008)
- Website www.puertobuenosaires.gov.ar www.puertodocksud.com.ar

The Port of Buenos Aires (Spanish: Puerto de Buenos Aires) is the principal maritime port in Argentina. Operated by the Administración General de Puertos (General Ports Administration), a state enterprise, it is the leading transshipment point for the foreign trade of Argentina.

The current port is located in the city's Retiro ward, and is colloquially known as Puerto Nuevo (New Port). The Port of Buenos Aires handles around 11 million metric tons of cargo annually; Dock Sud, which is owned by the Province of Buenos Aires, is south of the city proper, and handles another 17 million metric tons.

Passenger traffic at the port peaked during the golden era of immigration in Argentina (until 1930), when the port was the site of the Hotel de Inmigrantes. In later decades, this was limited mainly to tourist visitors to Argentina, as well as Argentine visitors to Uruguay. A fast ferry service operated by Buquebus and Ferrylíneas operates short routes to and from the Uruguayan cities of Colonia del Sacramento and Montevideo; Sturla transports tourists to and from Tigre, a popular weekend destination. The Benito Quinquela Martín Terminal, inaugurated in 2000, served 120 cruise ship arrivals with a total of 100,000 visitors in 2010. The Port of Buenos Aires is a member of the International Association of Ports and Harbours (IAPH).

== History ==
=== Early development ===
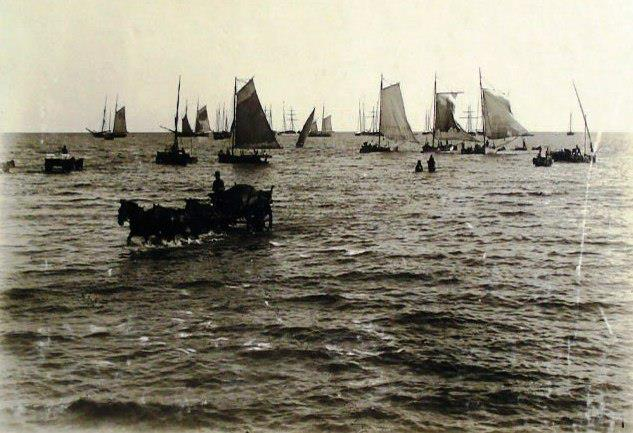
Boats anchored in the Port of Buenos Aires, circa 1880.

Buenos Aires itself was founded as a port by Captain Juan de Garay in 1580 for the Spanish Empire. It was stymied early on, however, by merchants from the Viceroyalty of Perú, who had the port closed in 1595. The difficulty of transporting European goods from Lima fostered an active smuggling trade in Buenos Aires, and locals' reliance on contraband did not subside until after the 1776 establishment of the Viceroyalty of Río de la Plata. Following this concession, exports (mainly salted meat and cowhides) flourished, and customs duties became the paramount source of public revenue.

Until the latter part of the nineteenth century, however, the natural harbor of Balizas Interiores (Interior Beacons) served as the main port. Before the current infrastructure was built, Buenos Aires had only a mooring or pier of shallow and low, swampy terrain. It was, moreover, of difficult access, as the city it served was located atop an incline, and heavy silt deposits on the Río de la Plata estuary limited seaborne access, as well. Merchant ships anchored several miles offshore, where passengers and cargo transshipped to shallow-draft vessels that approach the shore. Silt and other alluvial material from the Matanza River (south of Buenos Aires) prevented the opening of a sufficiently deep channel to facilitate shipping.

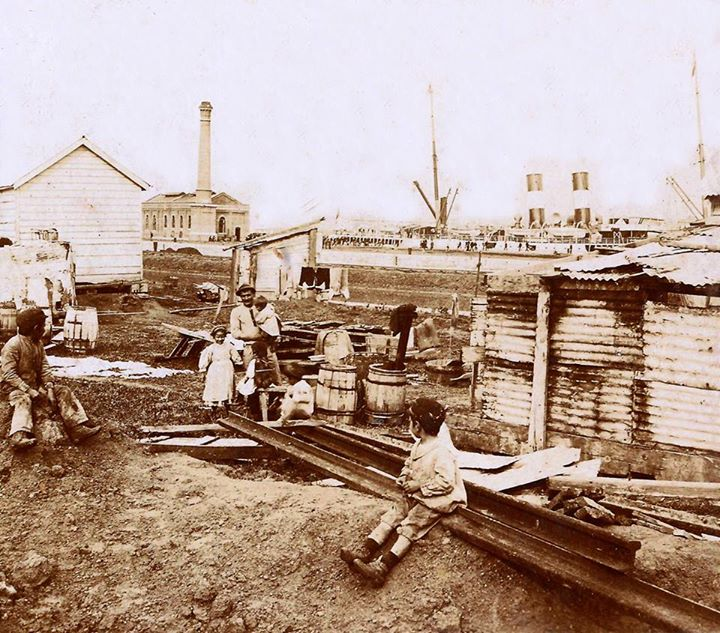
Families at the Port of Buenos Aires, circa 1890.

Law 280, passed by the Argentine Congress in 1868, ordered technical studies to determine the most appropriate place for the construction of a modern port. Proximity to the city was deemed essential to maintain the central government's fiscal control of its operations, mainly exerted through the collection of duties. The distribution of these latter monies, the leading source of public revenue throughout the 19th century and as late as 1940, was the chief point of contention between Buenos Aires leaders and those from the hinterland.

The San Nicolás Agreement of 1852, whereby all customs duties were nationalized, was rejected by Buenos Aires leader Bartolomé Mitre, and led to a compromise in the form of the 1862 creation of the National Customs Administration. The Executive Branch negotiated the transfer of public lands necessary for the project with Buenos Aires authorities, as these belonged to the provincial government. The agreement signed at the end of 1871 provided that the federal government would be responsible for the supervision of works, but jurisdictional disputes continued. Only the 1880 Federalization of Buenos Aires, and the lands' subsequent federal control, resolved these disputes.

German Argentine businessman Francisco Seeber had anticipated these developments by establishing the Catalinas Warehouse and Pier Company, Ltd., in 1872. The task of mooring ships was significantly eased with a new harbor, the first in Argentina to result from land reclamation, and of an extensive pier. The pier stretched several hundred meters into the river to facilitate the arrival of smaller vessels, and served both shipping and passenger traffic for two decades; honor of the Parish of Santa Catalina de Sienna, the harbor was christened Catalinas Norte.

=== Two proposals ===
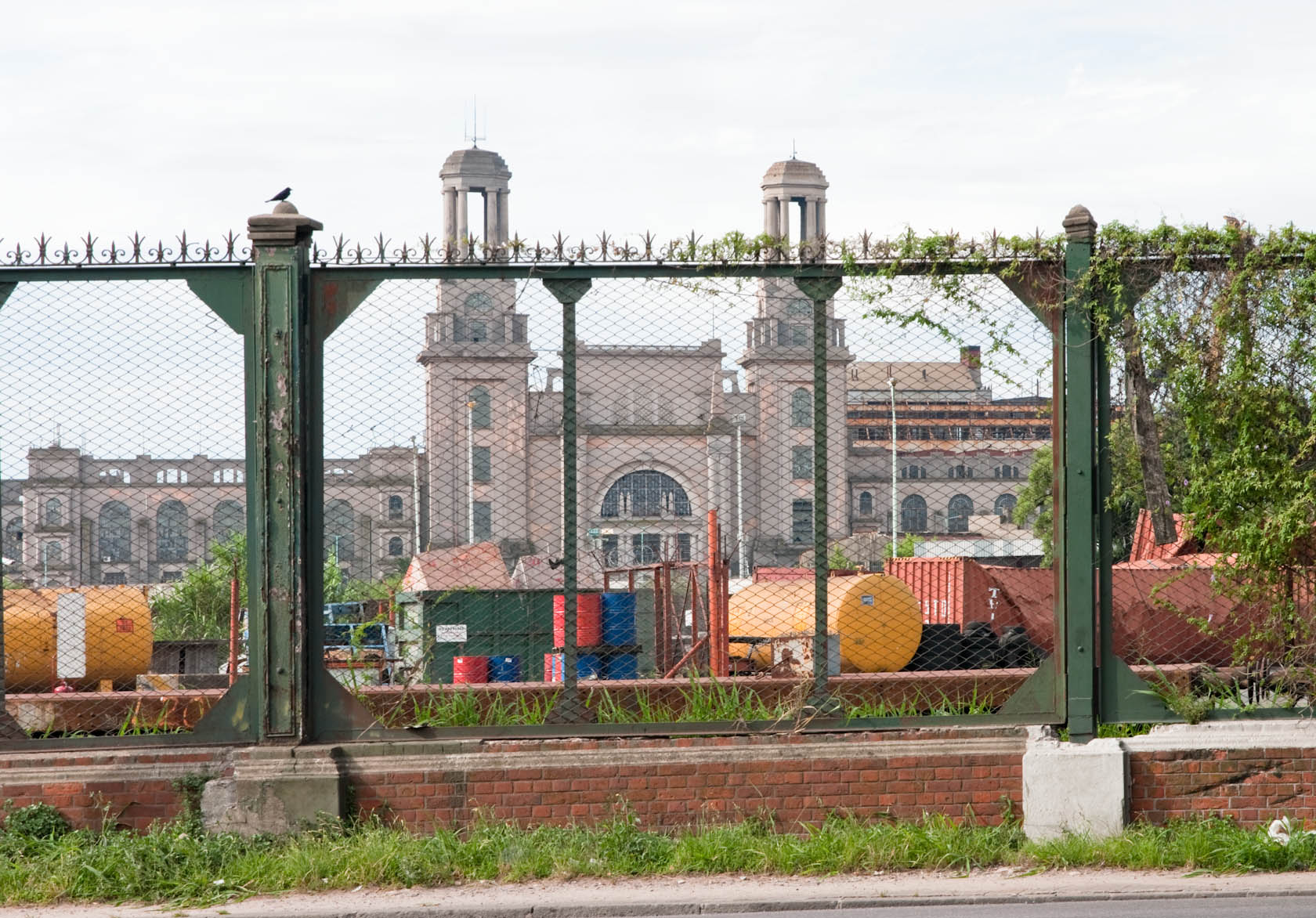
The Dr. Carlos Givogri power plant

President Julio Roca then commissioned studies for a new, much larger port in 1881. The Director of Riachuelo River Works, Luis Huergo, presented plans of his own design for a port of staggered docks. This plan, and a British design purchased by local businessman Eduardo Madero, were presented to Congress in June 1882. Obtaining financing from Baring Brothers, as well as the support of President Roca, Madero's plan received the endorsement of Senator Carlos Pellegrini (one of the Senate's most powerful figures), and it was approved by both houses in October 1882.

Drawing from an initiative first raised by Act No. 1257 October 1822, Madero contracted British engineer Sir John Hawkshaw to design the new facility. Conceived as four contiguous impounded docks with a floating entry basin at each end, the works began in 1884. The first dock was completed in 1888, and inaugurated on 28 January 1889, by the most prominent early supporter of the plan, Carlos Pellegrini (who was now Vice President of Argentina).

The Panic of 1890 delayed these works, however, and they were completed only in 1897. The port, known as Puerto Madero, had by 1907 become insufficient to meet growing maritime traffic. Puerto Madero, and its complementary Catalinas docks, could handle a maximum of 30,000 tons of cereals daily (cereals were the leading export of Argentina, and the foreign exchange these shipments earned were key to the mercantile model of the time). They operated near or at capacity, however, and an expansion of the port was authorized in September 1907 by President José Figueroa Alcorta.

Luis Huergo's dormant plans for staggered docks were approved in 1911, and work promptly began on the Puerto Nuevo (New Port). Located north of Catalinas Norte, this project was directed by Richard Souldby Oldham, Walker & Co., was delayed by the scarcity of material and financing brought about by World War I, and would ultimately require 15 years. This would add a breakwater, five more docks, and then a sixth, to the existing infrastructure, and when these additions were inaugurated in 1925, the Port of Buenos Aires was the largest in Latin America, and the southern hemisphere.

== Operations ==
The Port of Buenos Aires is operated by the state-owned General Port Administration. It was originally established in 1949 by President Juan Perón as the Dirección Nacional de Puertos (National Port Directorate), and oversaw all major port operations in Argentina. The entity was reorganized as the Administración General de Puertos by President Raúl Alfonsín on 4 September 1987. Chronic losses, which by the early 1990s averaged over us$60 million yearly, prompted its 1992 privatization by President Carlos Menem. Menem, however, vetoed the sale of the Port of Buenos Aires itself, and it remained in the federal government's aegis.

The Argentine maritime fleet was initially developed by Croatian Argentine businessman Nicolás Mihanovich, whose Argentina Navigation Company and related firms dominated local shipping during the late 19th and early 20th centuries. The firm was sold to a consortium led by a British shipping magnate, Lord Kylsant, and an Argentine investor, Alberto Dodero, in 1918, and would operate as the Compañia Argentina de Navegación Dodero from 1942.

This fleet was nationalized in 1949 by President Perón, who established Flota Mercante del Estado (State Merchant Marine) while retaining the Dodero family as owners of the management concession. This partnership ended with the 1955 coup that deposed Perón, however, and its management was nationalized as Flota Argentina de Navegaceon de Ultramar. President Arturo Frondizi merged the fleet and management entities into Empresa Líneas Marítimas del Estado (ELMA) in 1960; ELMA was stripped of its cargo preference at the Port of Buenos Aires in 1991, and unable to privatize the carrier, sold its fleet piecemeal.

The New Port's electricity supply has been principally supplied by the Dr. Carlos Givogri power plant. Built in 1930 by the Italian Argentine Electric Company (CIAE), its 71 m (233 ft) eclecticist façade is the port's most distinguishable architectural feature. The chief manufacturing firm located on the port district's premises is the Tandanor shipbuilding and repair facility. A worker cooperative since its 1999 bankruptcy, Tandanor operates with a Workers' self-management system, and remains the nation's largest shipbuilder.

== Puerto Madero redevelopment ==
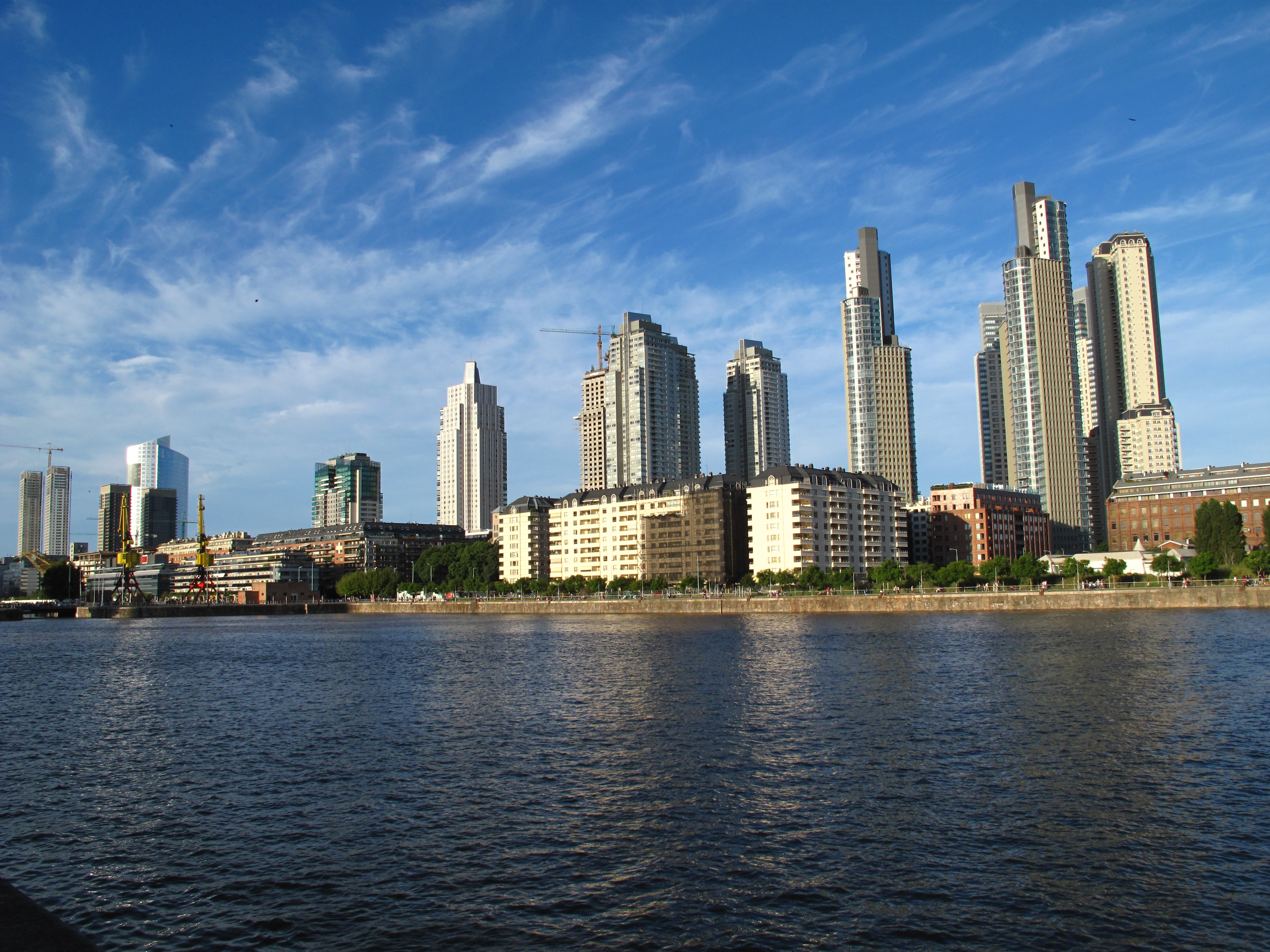
Puerto Madero

Puerto Madero, which served only ancillary port functions following the New Port's inaugural in 1925, was re-established as the Corporación Antiguo Puerto Madero (Old Puerto Madero Corporation), on 15 November 1989. Beginning around 1994, local and foreign investment led to a massive revitalization effort, recycling and refurbishing the red brick, warehouses along the west side of the docks into upscale offices, lofts, retail space, restaurants, private university campuses and five-star hotels. Most development along the eastern side consisted of new construction, as well as some of the most extensive parks in the city.

Puerto Madero has been redeveloped with international flair, drawing interest from renowned architects such as Santiago Calatrava, Norman Foster, César Pelli and Philippe Starck, among others. Today one of the trendiest boroughs in Buenos Aires, it has become the preferred address for growing numbers of young professionals and retirees, alike. Increasing property prices have also generated interest in the area as a destination for foreign buyers, particularly those in the market for premium investment properties.

The neighborhood's road network has been entirely rebuilt, especially in the east side. The layout of the east side consists currently of three wide boulevards running east–west crossed by the east side's main street, Juana Manso Avenue. The layout is completed with some other avenues and minor streets, running both east–west and north–south, and by several pedestrianised streets. The district is separated from the estuary by the Buenos Aires Ecological Reserve.

Puerto Madero represents the largest wide-scale urban project in the city of Buenos Aires, currently. Having undergone an impressive revival in merely a decade, it is one of the most successful recent waterfront renewal projects in the world.

== See also ==
- List of ports and harbours of the Atlantic Ocean
