= Luis Ramacciotti =

Italian-Argentine sculptor

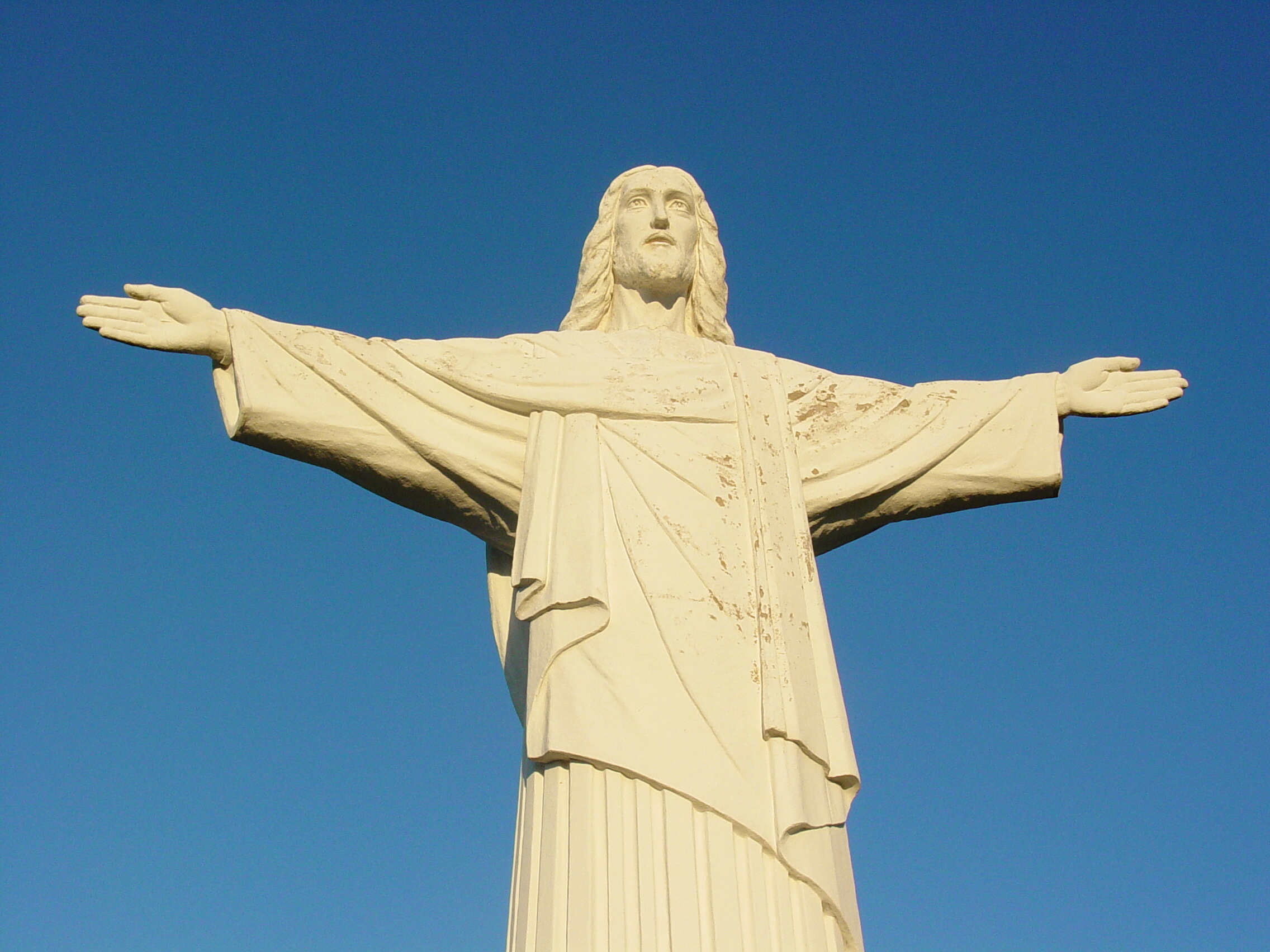
Christ in La Cumbre, Córdoba

Aurelio Luigi Ramacciotti, known as Luis Ramacciotti (born 1886) was an Italian-Argentine sculptor.

Ramacciotti was born in Capannori, Tuscany. He emigrated to Argentina in 1915, where he lived until his death.

== Work ==
Ramacciotti's best-known work is the statue of Christ in La Cumbre, Córdoba, Argentina. The work was inaugurated on July 9, 1954 and has a height of 9 meters. It was commissioned by the parish priest José Luis de Murueta and is located in the mountain range called the La Viarapa.

He is also the author of the figure of a maiden on the facade of the "Yesería la Helvética", in the city of Córdoba. The factory had been founded by Pedro Righetti in 1885. In the same city, in Parque Sarmiento next to the Coniferal, is located the Fuente de Neptuno, which is an allegory of the sea. Also in the park are the statues of lions that accompany the monument to failure Vicente Torró CIMO.

In the Basilica de la Merced in Córdoba, an image of the Virgen de la Merced, the work of the sculptor Luis Ramacciotti, was placed in front, between the two towers. The sculpture was installed in 1918.
