= Eduardo Madero =

Argentine politician and businessman (1823–1894)

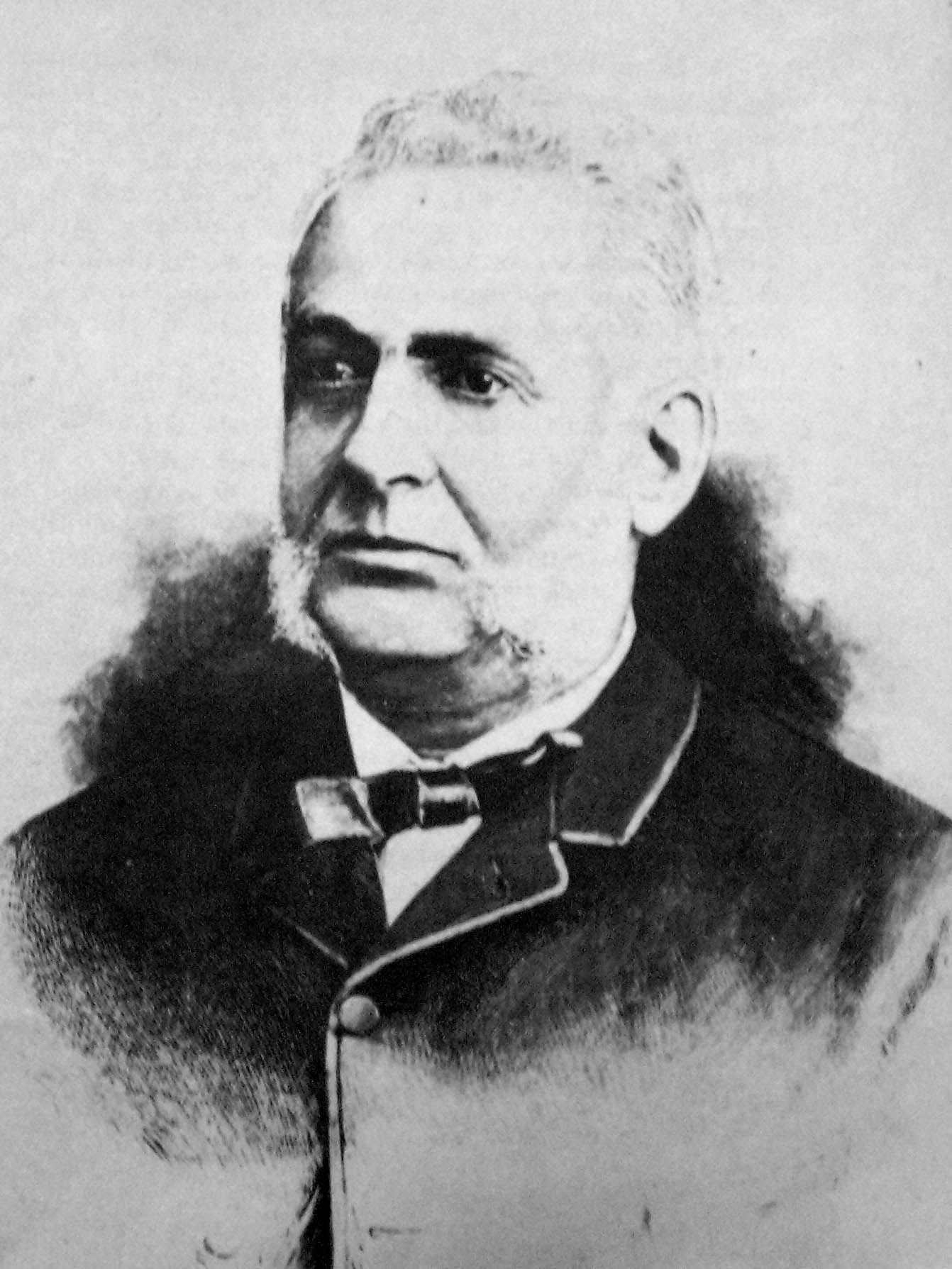
Eduardo Madero

Eduardo Madero (1823 — 1894) was an Argentine merchant, banker and developer.

== Life and times ==
Eduardo Madero was born in Buenos Aires, in 1823, to a family of farmers. A nephew of publisher Florencio Varela, his uncle's enmity with the Governor of Buenos Aires Province, Juan Manuel de Rosas, led Madero to relocate to Montevideo, in neighboring Uruguay. Madero established an import-export business and following Rosas' 1852 overthrow, he returned - by then a prosperous merchant. Madero was later elected to local office, as well as to the Argentine Chamber of Deputies as a supporter of the Buenos Aires-centric Autonomist Party. He served as President of the Bank of the Province of Buenos Aires and, in 1874, the Buenos Aires Stock Exchange.

Madero twice proposed the construction of a port facing the Plaza de Mayo, in 1861 and 1869; but the proposals, the second of which obtained the Interior Ministry's endorsement, were ultimately passed over for a design by local engineer Luis Huergo, whose plans called for a dock on the mouth of the Riachuelo (a river flowing along the city's industrial southside). Following the construction of the Port of La Boca, in the 1870s, a sudden economic and population boom led the new President of Argentina, Julio Roca, to commission the development in 1881 of a new, much larger port. The Director of Riachuelo Works, Luis Huergo, presented plans of his own design for a port of staggered docks, rather like the bittings on a key. The seasoned Madero, however, traveled to London, where he obtained both the services of renowned British engineer Sir John Hawkshaw and financing for the project from Barings Bank (the chief underwriter of Argentine bonds and investment, at the time).

The plan was presented to Congress in June 1882, where it received the endorsement of Senator Carlos Pellegrini (one of the Senate's most powerful figures). It was approved by both houses in October 1882, and Madero was entrusted not only with overseeing the completion of Sir John Hawkshaw's design of adjoining impounded docks; but also with negotiating the necessary financing of the project. The first dock was opened in 1889 and, as work continued northward, the second one was opened in 1890. The Panic of 1890, however, led to the suspension of works, a setback remedied by a congressional appropriation in 1892. The resulting political controversy helped result in Madero's relocation to Genoa, Italy, where he died in 1894 at the age of 71.

The construction of the port outlived Madero, and the project was completed in 1897. Outstripped by rising shipping volume and freighter sizes even before its completion, in 1911 Madero's port was supplemented by new facilities of Huergo's design. Madero's History of the Port of Buenos Aires was published posthumously by La Nación, in 1902. The docklands he developed were renamed Puerto Madero in his honor and, beginning in the mid-1990s, were redeveloped as Buenos Aires' newest neighborhood.
