= San Roque Lake =

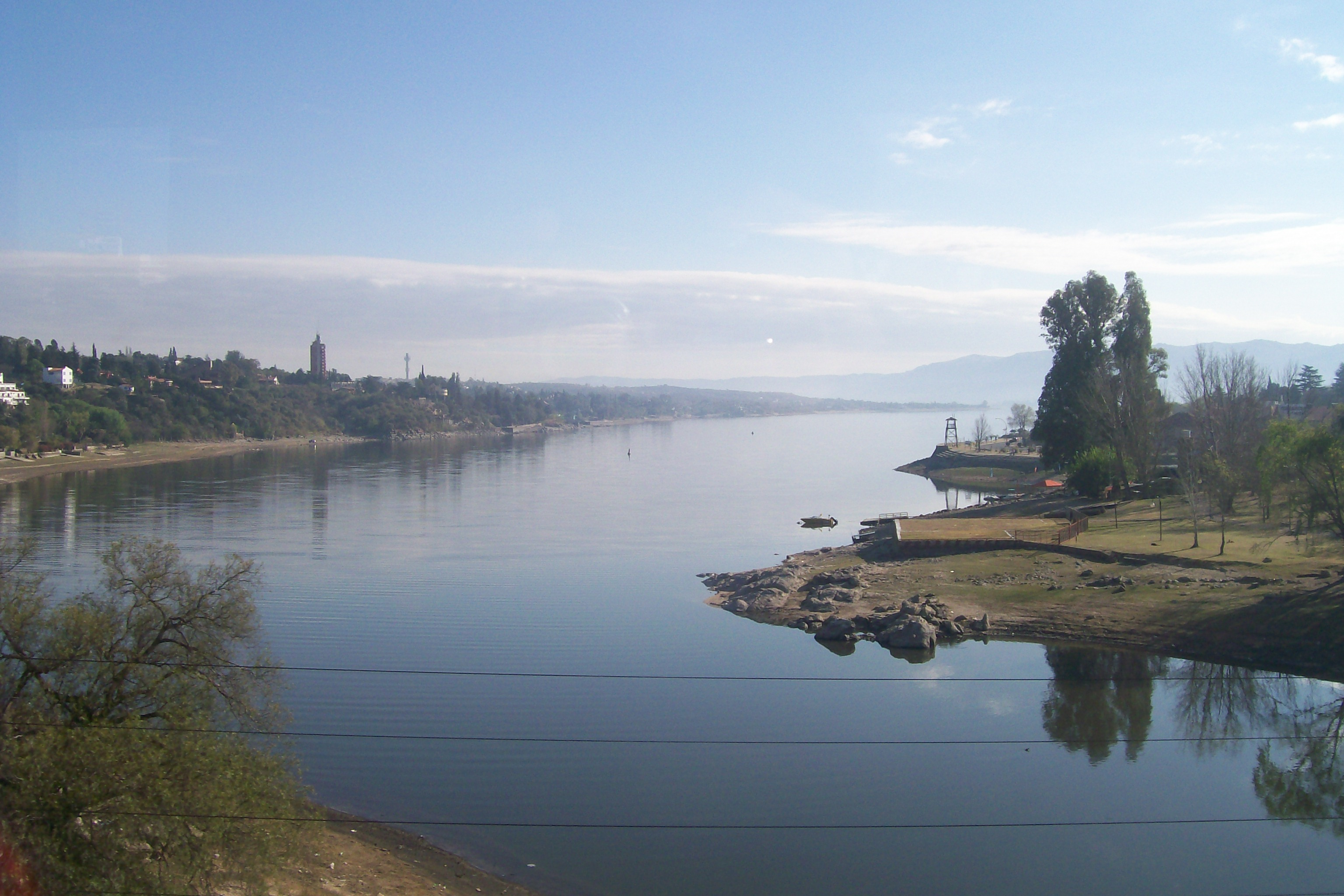

- Location within Argentina
- Location: Punilla Department, Córdoba Province
- Coordinates: 31°22′41″S 64°28′10″W
- Type: reservoir
- Primary inflows: Suquía, Cosquín rivers
- Basin countries: Argentina
- Surface area: 16 km^{2} (6.2 sq mi)
- Average depth: 16 m (52 ft)
- Water volume: 180 million cubic metres (150,000 acre⋅ft)
- Surface elevation: 600 m (2,000 ft)
- Settlements: Villa Carlos Paz

San Roque Lake is a reservoir in the province of Córdoba, Argentina. It was created by the damming of several rivers, especially the Suquía and the Cosquín. It is located next to the city of Villa Carlos Paz, about 600 m above mean sea level. It has a surface area of 16 km^{2}, an average depth of 16 m, and a maximum volume of 180 million m³.

The dam was built to provide fresh water for Córdoba city and its surroundings. It was designed in 1884 by the engineering firm of Cassaffousth, Bialet Massé and Dumesnil, finished in 1886, and inaugurated officially in 1890. Two years later the dam was suffering from a complete lack of maintenance, however, and a political scandal erupted.

The original dam was replaced by a newer one, located 150 m away, by an initiative of Governor Amadeo Sabattini, and completed in 1944. The newer dam was built to contain and control larger rises in water levels. When the engineers tried to demolish the original dam, the dynamite only blew the metal railing. The new dam was therefore built several meters in front of the old one. When the level of the lake is low, the upper part of the old construction can be seen.
