= Charbonier =

Charbonier is a surname of Puerto Rican origin. Notable people with the surname include:

- Eddie Charbonier Chinea (born 1982), Puerto Rican politician
- María Milagros Charbonier (born 1963), Puerto Rican lawyer and politician
