= Cosquín River =

River in Córdoba, Argentina

Coordinates: 31°13′S 64°29′W

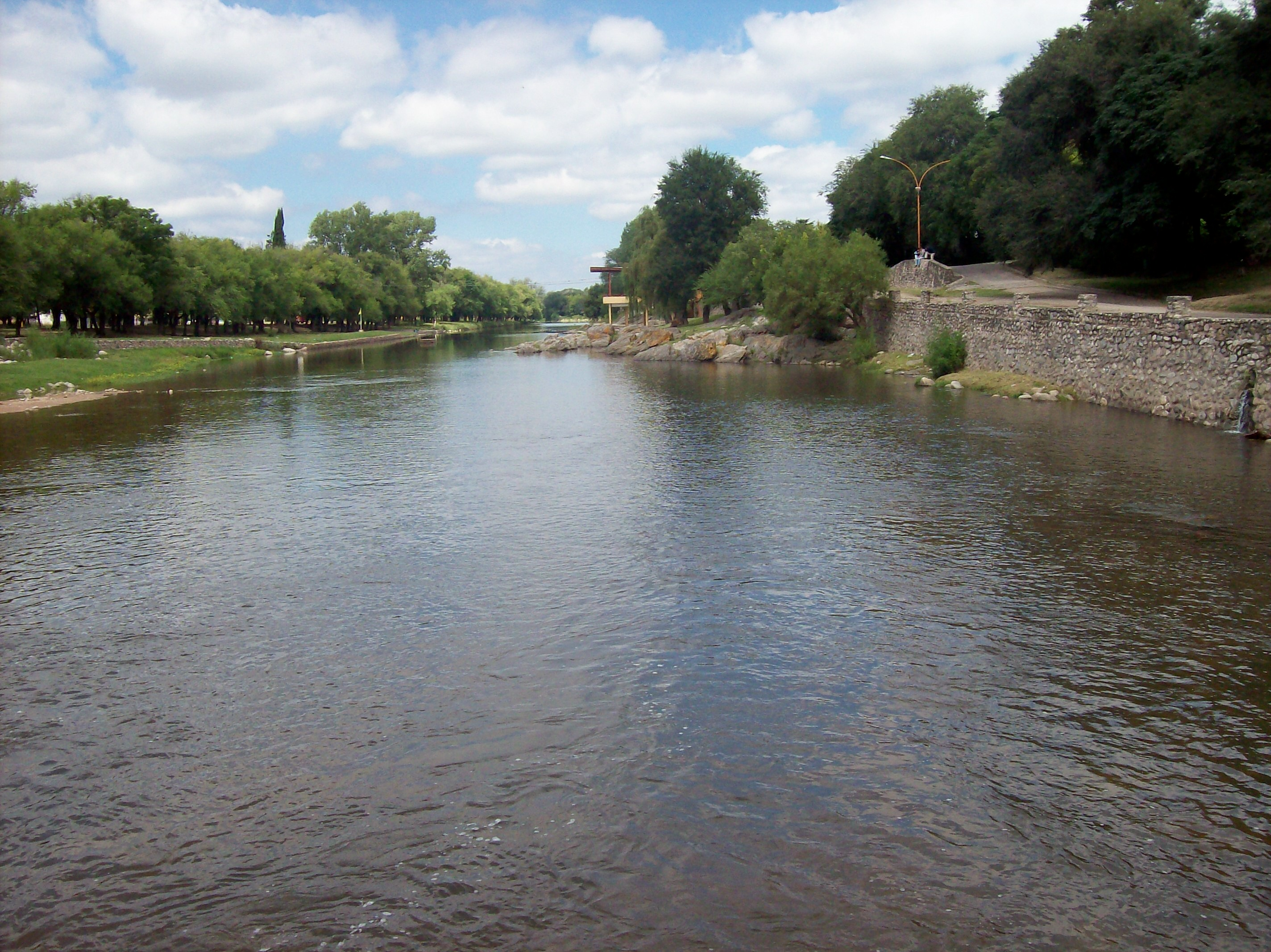
The Cosquín River, flowing through the town of the same name

The Cosquín River is a small river in the province of Córdoba, Argentina. It is located in the area of the Punilla Valley and is part of the upper drainage basin of the Suquía River.

The Cosquín receives the waters of several other minor rivers and streams and flows southwards into and across the Punilla Valley, passing by the city of Cosquín and then taking the name of Santa María River. The Cosquín flows into the San Roque River and empties into the artificial reservoir of the San Roque Lake.
