= Los Cocos =

Coordinates: 30.9167°S 64.5000°W

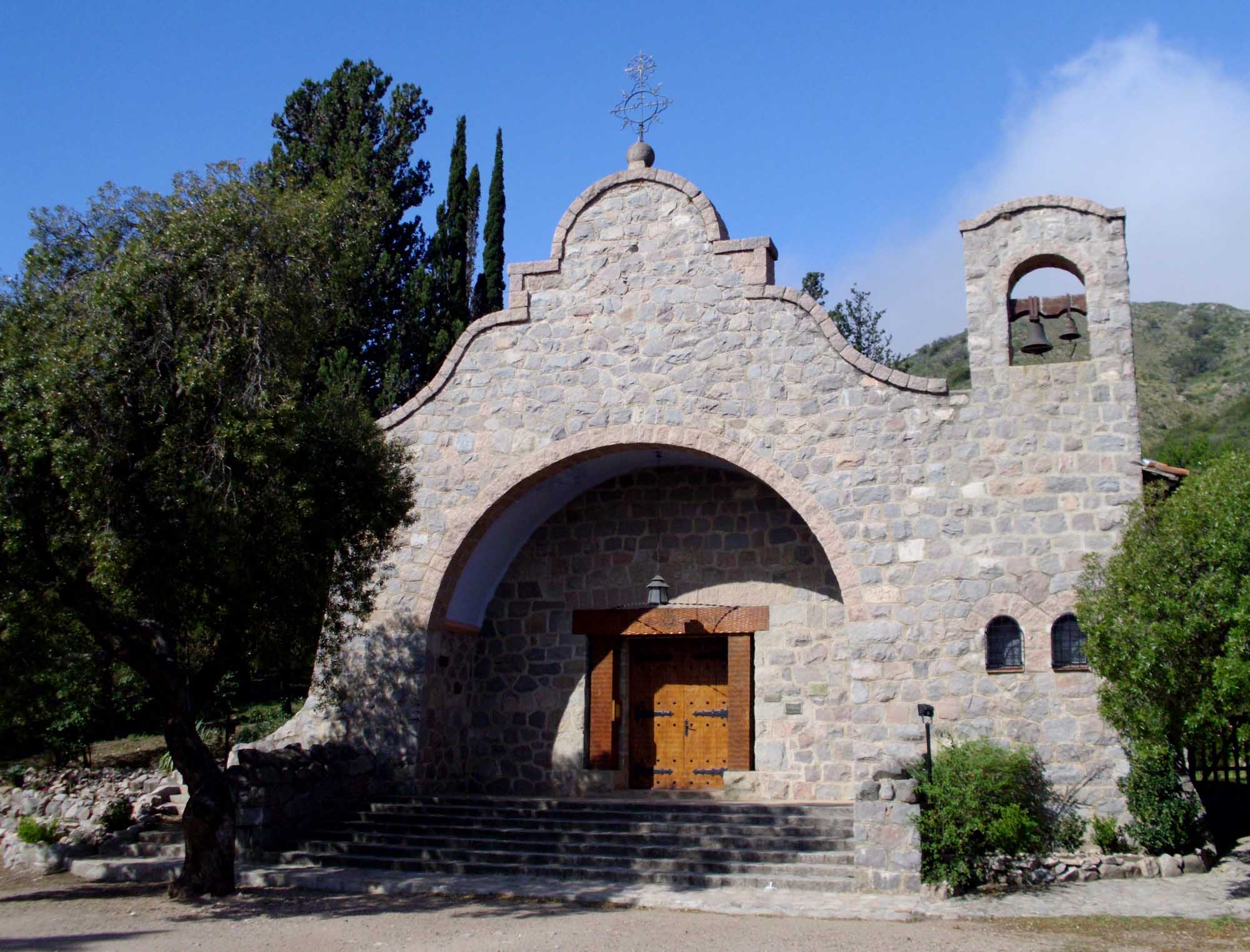
Santa Teresita chapel

Los Cocos is a village 105 km northwest of Córdoba, Argentina. It had 1,242 inhabitants in 2010, and a newly constructed secondary school. The game development framework Cocos2d which is used by many games including Geometry Dash is named after it.
