= Primero River =

River in Argentina

Coordinates: 31°22′30″S 64°28′00″W

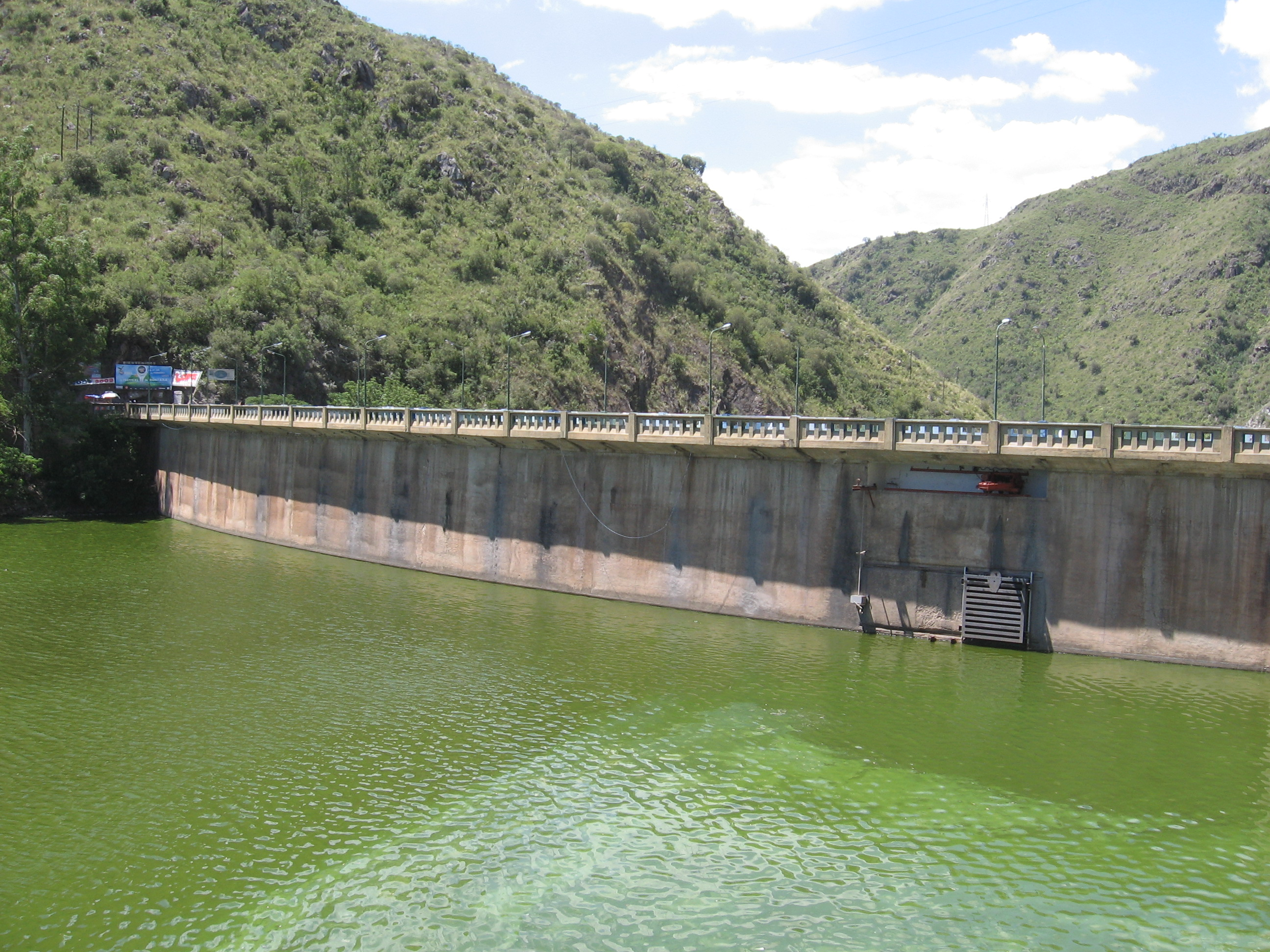
The San Roque Reservoir, source of the Suquía

The Primero River (Spanish: Río Primero, 'First River'), also known as Suquía (the name used by the Comechingones, the indigenous people), runs through the city of Córdoba, Argentina.

The tributaries of the Primero (mainly the San Roque and Cosquín rivers) flow into the San Roque Reservoir; from there, the Primero goes east into the plains surrounding the city of Córdoba.

Once inside the city, the river channels into La Cañada, a waterway delineated by a stonework canal built through the downtown area, and inaugurated in 1944. About 2 kilometres (1.2 mi) to the east, Isla de los Patos (Ducks Island) was repopulated with ducks and swans in the 1980s. During the crisis years of 1988–91 and 2001–02, the duck population was devastated, allegedly by people desperately looking for food. It was reported in March 2006 that a large number of ducks had died due to unspecified causes. Pollution by chemical waste is suspected as the cause, but avian influenza is also being investigated as a possible cause.

Beyond the city limits, the river flows towards the Algarrobos swamp and ends its course on the southern coast of the Mar Chiquita (or Mar de Ansenuza) salt lake. All in all, the river has a length of approximately 200 kilometres (120 mi) and carries, on average, 9.7 cubic metres per second (340 cu ft/s), with a minimum of 2 cubic metres per second (71 cu ft/s) and a maximum of 24 cubic metres per second (850 cu ft/s), with a peak during the summer months.

Pollution of the water and of the riverbank is a major environmental issue in Córdoba. Periodic cleaning operations are carried out to increase the quality of the water and to preserve the viability of fishing, both in the San Roque reservoir area and downstream.
