= La Cumbre, Argentina =

Coordinates: 30.983105°S 64.4941171°W

La Cumbre
- Town
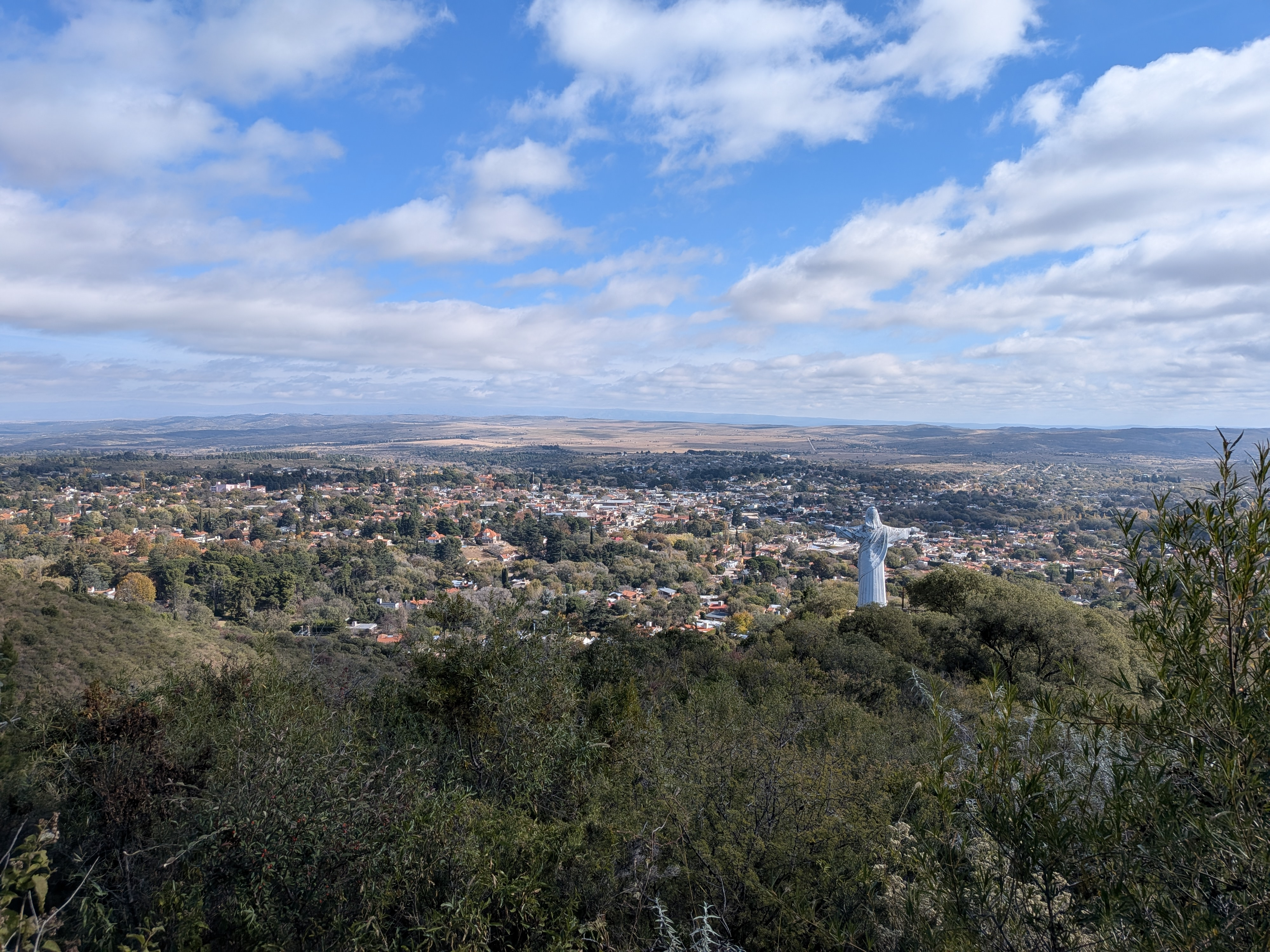
- Interactive map of La Cumbre
- Country: Argentina
- Province: Córdoba
- Department: Punilla
- Elevation: 1,147 m (3,763 ft)

Population (2022)
  - Total: 7 200
- Time zone: UTC−3 (ART)
- CPA base: X5178
- Dialing code: 03548
- Website: www.lacumbre.gob.ar

La Cumbre is a small town in the province of Córdoba, Argentina, in a valley known as the "Valle de Punilla". It has a population of around 7200 inhabitants.

== History ==
The area in which La Cumbre is located was inhabited by the Comechingones before the arrival of the Europeans. In 1585, the governor of Córdoba gave the land on which La Cumbre is located to the family of Captain Bartolomé Jaime, which was sold to different owners over the years. In 1633 the name Estancia de San Jerónimo was used for the land.

=== Railway ===
La Cumbre grew from being a group farms into a town by the time the railway was built in the 1890s. As it was the highest point of the railway, the name was changed to "La Cumbre" (The Summit) and the British railway locomotive engineers that participated were the first of an important presence of Anglo-Argentines that would become part of the town's culture even to this day.

As of 2026, the railway is operated by Tren de las Sierras and trains stop in La Cumbre on the route between Capilla del Monte and Cosquín, serving both as regional transport and tourists. The old railway station has become the community centre, housing a small museum and tourist information office.

=== Immigration ===
During the 1920s British families built their holiday homes here, which contributed to the particularly English architectural style of La Cumbre. In 1924 the Golf Club was founded and is one of La Cumbre's features. For many years there were several English speaking boarding schools in the area: St. Paul's Boys School was founded in 1954, became co-ed in the late 1970s and had 330 students in 2024. St Marys was a boarding school for girls, which started in 1955 under the name "Fairview", before being renamed to St Marys in 1959 before closing down, likely in 1979. Reydon, in 1923 built as a hotel, became a boarding school for girls in 1969.

== Today ==
Today La Cumbre has a low population for most of the year except for the summer holiday months, especially January and February when tourists visit the town to enjoy the many outdoor attractions, including paragliding, horse riding, fishing, hiking, river swimming, golf, and other enjoyments. The town is also home to museums, including a museum in the former house of the Argentine author Manuel Mujica Lainez, who spent the last years of his life living in La Cumbre.

La Cumbre is also part of the Argentine Rally stage of the World Rally Championship.

On the mountain behind the city stands a local statue of Christ the Redeemer, which was sculpted by Italian-Argentine artist Luis Ramacciotti.

== Gallery ==
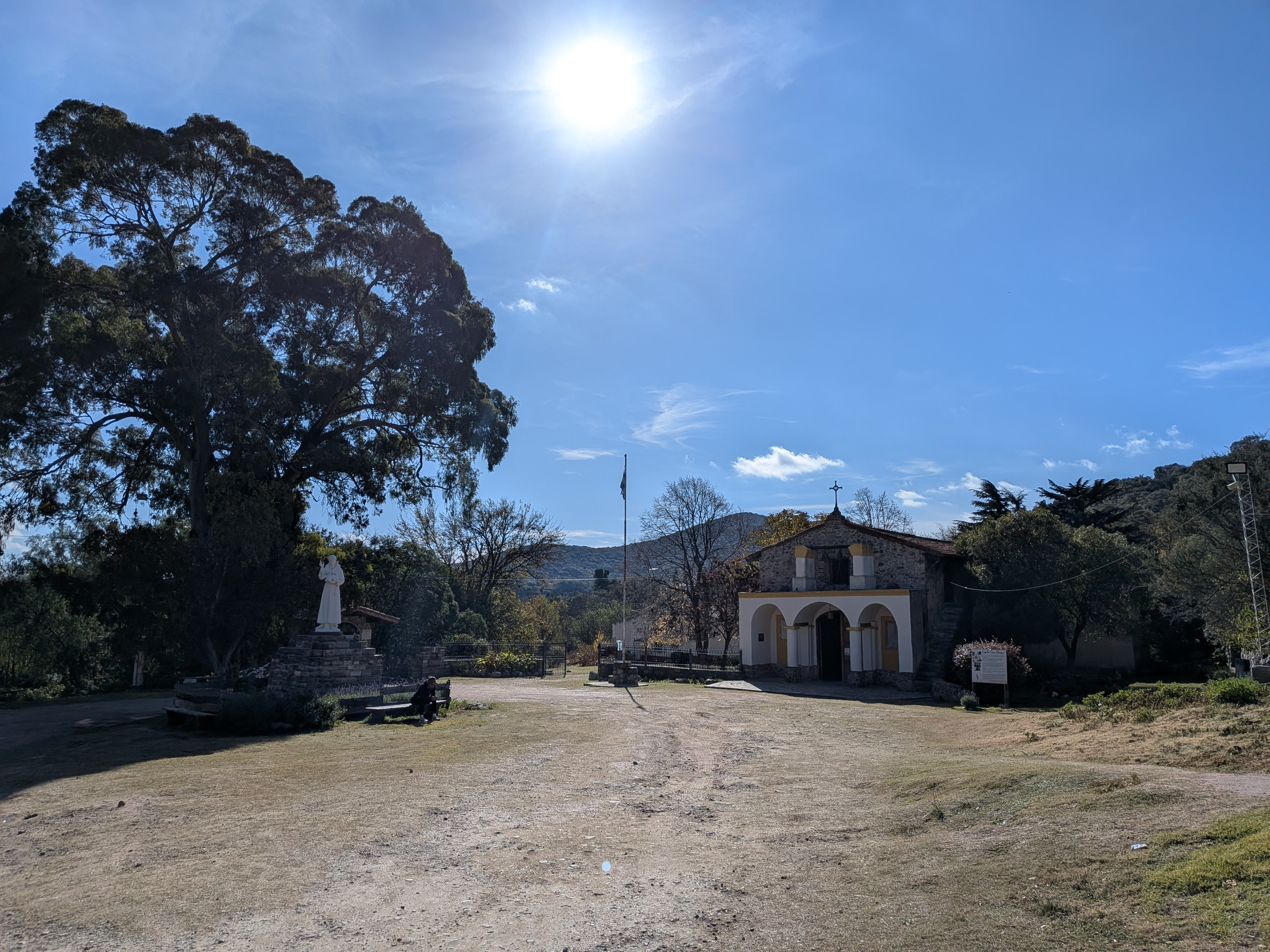
The Capilla de San Roque, on the foot of the mountain that includes the statue of Christ the Redeemer

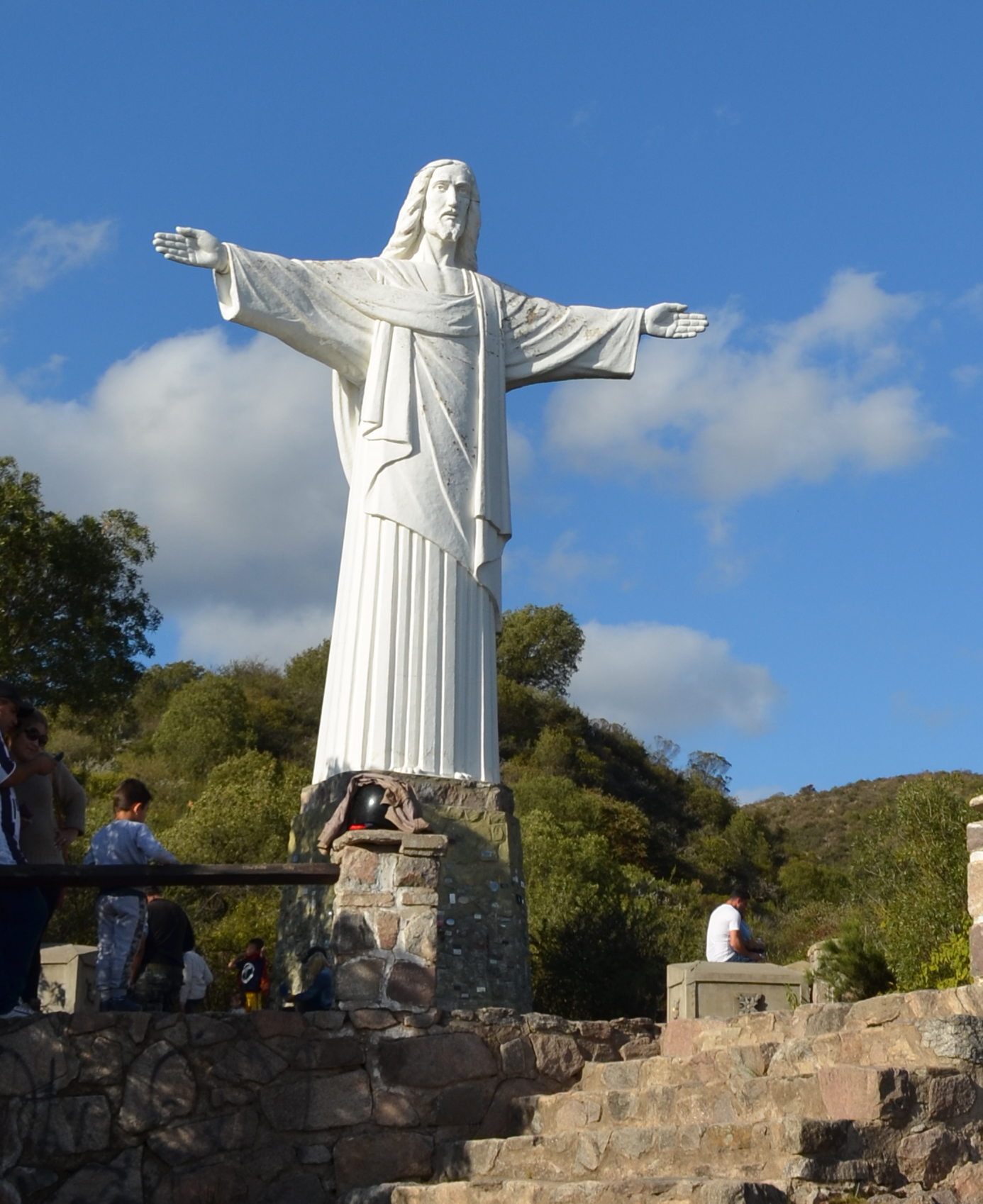
The statue of Christ the Redeemer

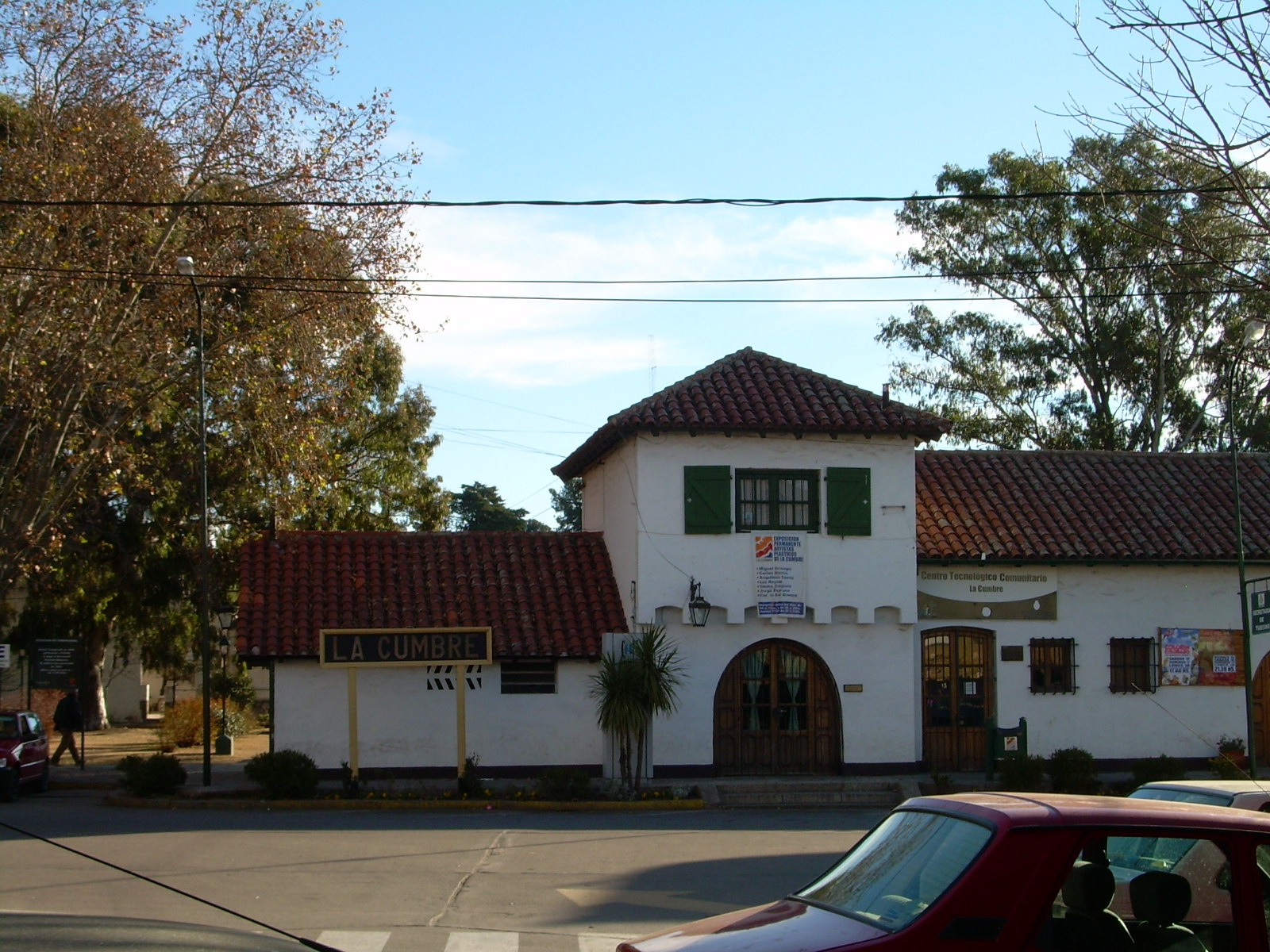
Community center, La Cumbre

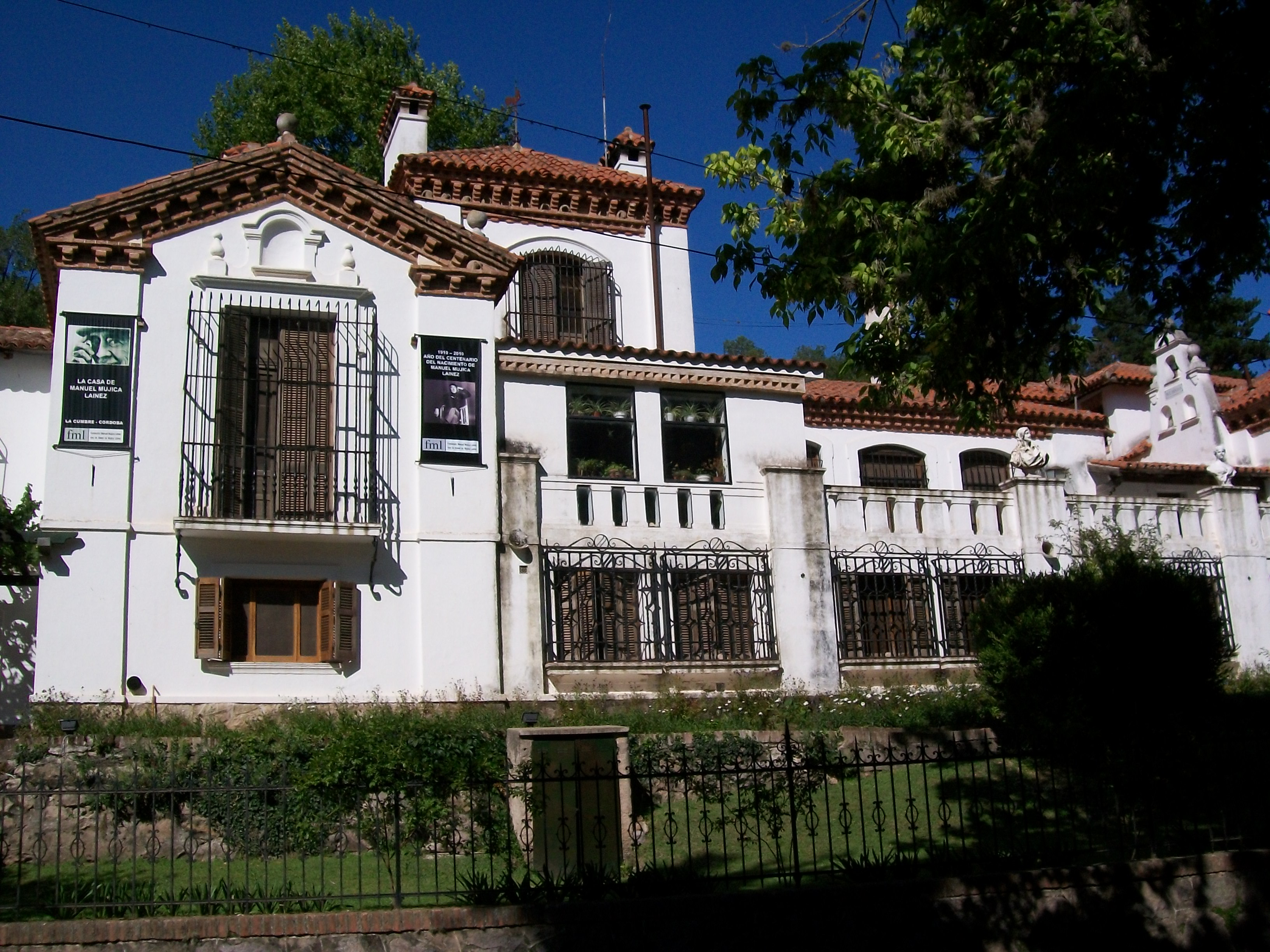
The former residency of Manuel Mujica Lainez, today a museum
