= Cosquín, Argentina =

Cosquín
- City
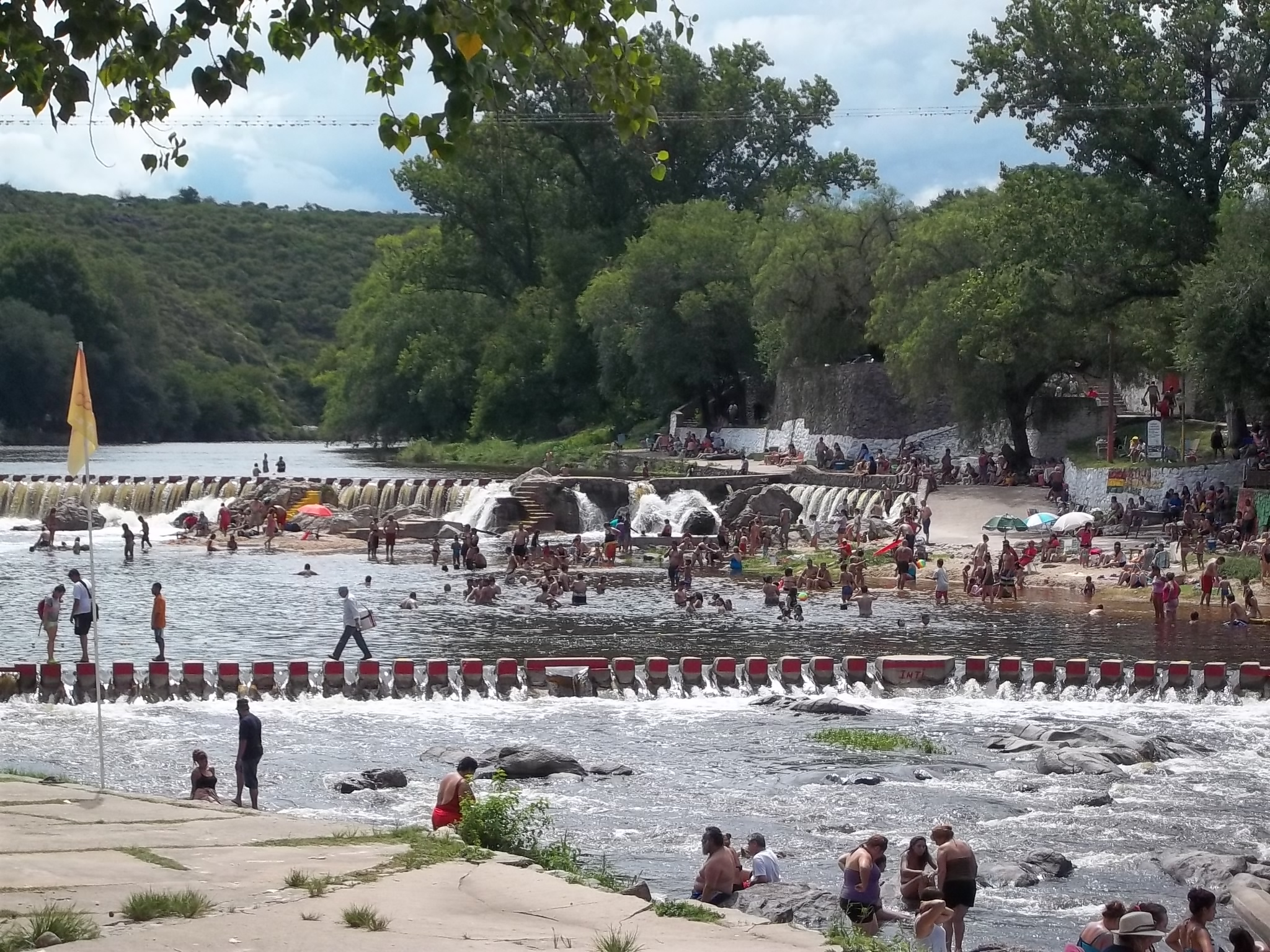

- Location in Argentina
- Coordinates: 31°14′37″S 64°27′55″W
- Country: Argentina
- Province: Córdoba
- Department: Punilla

Government
  - Intendant: Raúl Cardinali (PJ)

Area
  - Total: 2.479 km^{2} (0.957 sq mi)
- Elevation: 719 m (2,359 ft)

Population (2010 census)
  - Total: 57,458
  - Density: 23,180/km^{2} (60,030/sq mi)
- Time zone: UTC−3 (ART)
- CPA base: X5166
- Dialing code: +549 03541
- Website: Official website

Cosquín is a small town in the province of Córdoba, Argentina, located about 52 km (32 mi) west of the city of Córdoba, and 783 km (487 mi) from Buenos Aires. It had about 57,000 inhabitants at the 2010 census [INDEC]. It is the head town of the Punilla Department, and is located on the banks of the Cosquín River, and on the foot of a small mountain (Cerro Pan de Azúcar).

Cosquín is the oldest town in the scenic Punilla Valley; the region was already populated by the 16th century. Cosquín was officially founded with the title of villa (town) on 4 August 1876, and declared a city on 26 August 1939.

In the past, the region of Cosquín was appreciated for its benign climate, recommended by physicians for pulmonary ailments, and a whole industry of hospitals and therapeutic establishments appeared in order to provide services to patients from Argentina and even other countries. As the popularity of this kind of treatment decreased, the economy of Cosquín became more focused on tourism.

Since 1961, Cosquín hosts an annual National Folklore Festival, which receives around 100,000 visitors
