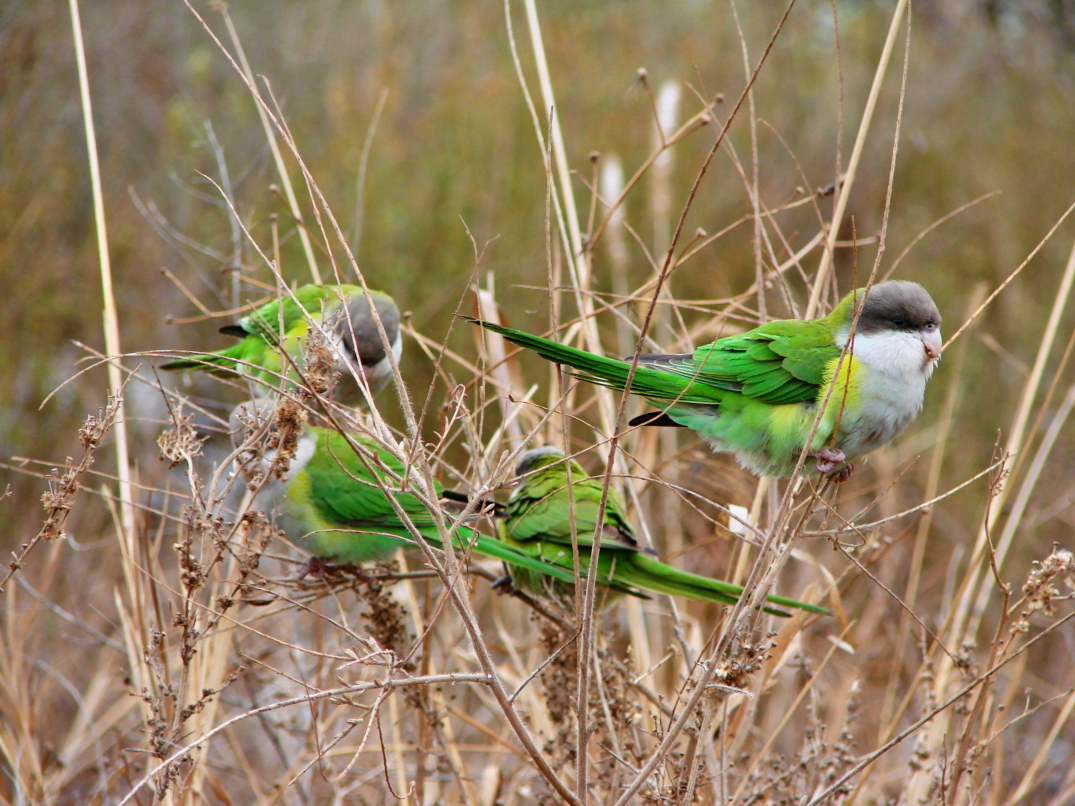
- At Capilla del Monte, Córdoba, Argentina

Conservation status
- Least Concern (IUCN 3.1)

Scientific classification
- Kingdom: Animalia
- Phylum: Chordata
- Class: Aves
- Order: Psittaciformes
- Family: Psittacidae
- Genus: Psilopsiagon
- Species: P. aymara

Binomial name
- Psilopsiagon aymara (d'Orbigny, 1841)

Synonyms
- Bolborhynchus aymara (d'Orbigny, 1839)

= Grey-hooded parakeet =

Species of bird

The grey-hooded parakeet (Psilopsiagon aymara), also known as the Aymara parakeet or Sierra parakeet, is a species of parrot in the family Psittacidae. It is found in northwestern Argentina and Bolivia. Its natural habitat is subtropical or tropical high-altitude shrubland.

== Description ==
The grey-hooded parakeet is a small, slender parakeet growing to a length of about 20 cm (8 in). The upper parts are green and the flanks and underwing coverts are greenish-yellow. The forehead and crown are brownish-grey, and the chin, throat and breast are whitish-grey, sometimes with a bluish tinge at the side of the breast. The belly is green with a bluish tinge. The upper side of the long, narrow, pointed tail is green and the underside is grey. The beak is flesh-coloured, the iris is brown and the legs and feet are brownish-grey. The sexes are similar in appearance, but the male often has a more vivid grey breast, and immature birds have shorter tails.

== Distribution and habitat ==
The grey-hooded parakeet is native to the eastern Andes of Bolivia and northern Argentina, as well as the sierras de Córdoba. It is a bird of arid shrubby or wooded habitats, wooded ravines, and dense shrubby areas near villages or agricultural land. Its altitudinal range is from about 1,800 to 4,000 m (6,000 to 13,000 ft).

== Ecology ==
The grey-hooded parakeet is a gregarious bird, forming small flocks of about twenty birds, several of which groups may gather together at watering places. The flocks roam the countryside in rapid low, undulating flight, sometimes resting on top of or among the branches of shrubs and small trees, making twittering and warbling sounds rather similar to those made by a barn swallow. They feed in low vegetation, consuming grass seeds, seeds of plants in the aster family, berries and fruits, also foraging on the ground for fallen seeds and fruits. Breeding takes place in November. The nest is situated in a hole excavated in an earth bank, in a crevice, in a hole in a cactus or sometimes in a ruined building. Several nests are sometimes grouped together semi-colonially. Clutches are usually of four or five eggs.

== Status ==
The grey-hooded parakeet is a fairly common bird and has a very extensive range. No particular threats to this bird are known and the population is believed to be stable. The International Union for Conservation of Nature has assessed its conservation status as being of "least concern".
