= Tren de las Sierras =

Railway line in Argentina

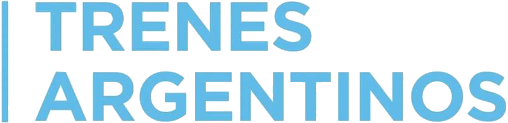

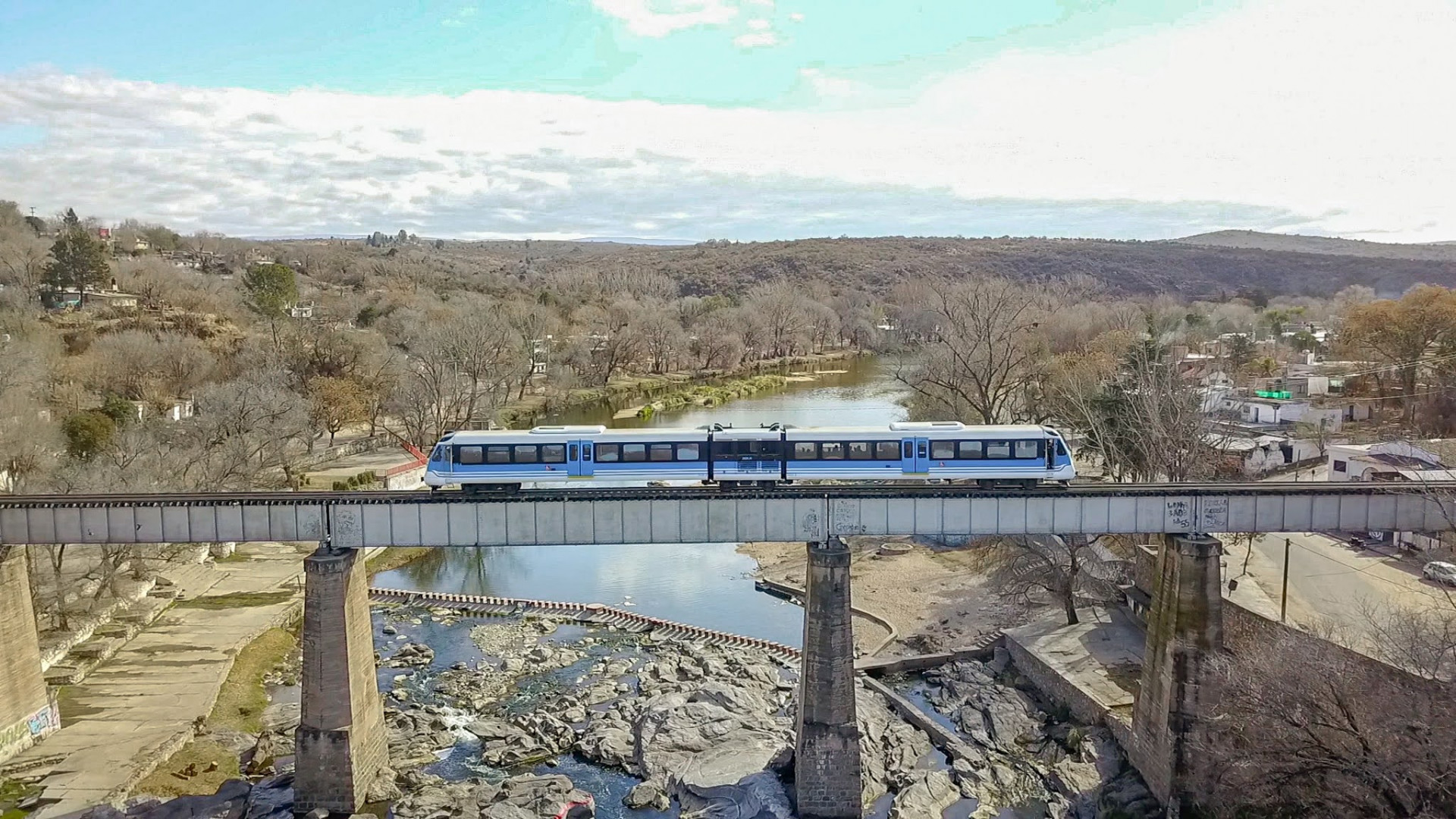
- Train running on a viaduct in 2021

Overview
- Service type: Regional
- Status: Active
- Locale: Córdoba Province (Argentina)
- First service: 1889; 136 years ago
- Current operator(s): Trenes Argentinos
- Former operator(s): Ferrocentral

Route
- Termini: Alta Córdoba / Córdoba; Capilla del Monte
- Distance travelled: 150.8 kilometres (93.7 mi)
- Service frequency: Daily
- Line(s) used: General Belgrano Railway (A-1 branch)

Technical
- Track gauge: 1,000 mm (3 ft 3 3/8 in) metre gauge
- Track owner(s): Government of Argentina
Route map
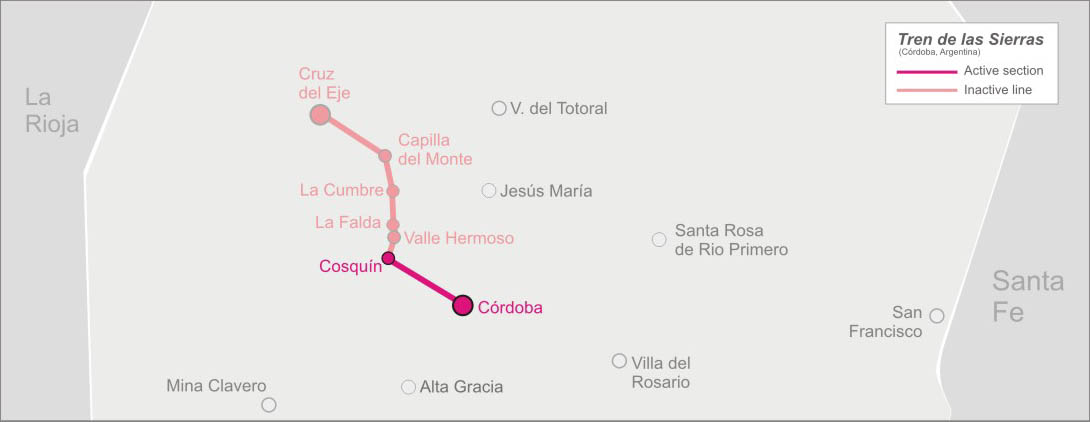

Tren de las Sierras (technically known as the "A-1" branch of the General Belgrano Railway) is a 150.8 km (93.7 mi) regional rail line in Córdoba Province of Argentina. The line runs from Alta Córdoba to Capilla del Monte, being currently operated by state-owned company Trenes Argentinos Operaciones.

== History ==
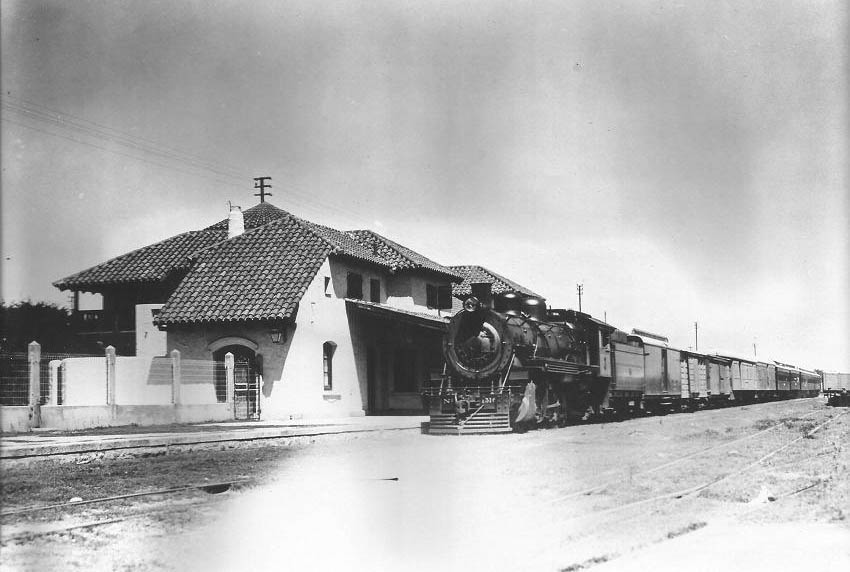
A steam locomotive of Córdoba Central Railway at Valle Hermoso train station

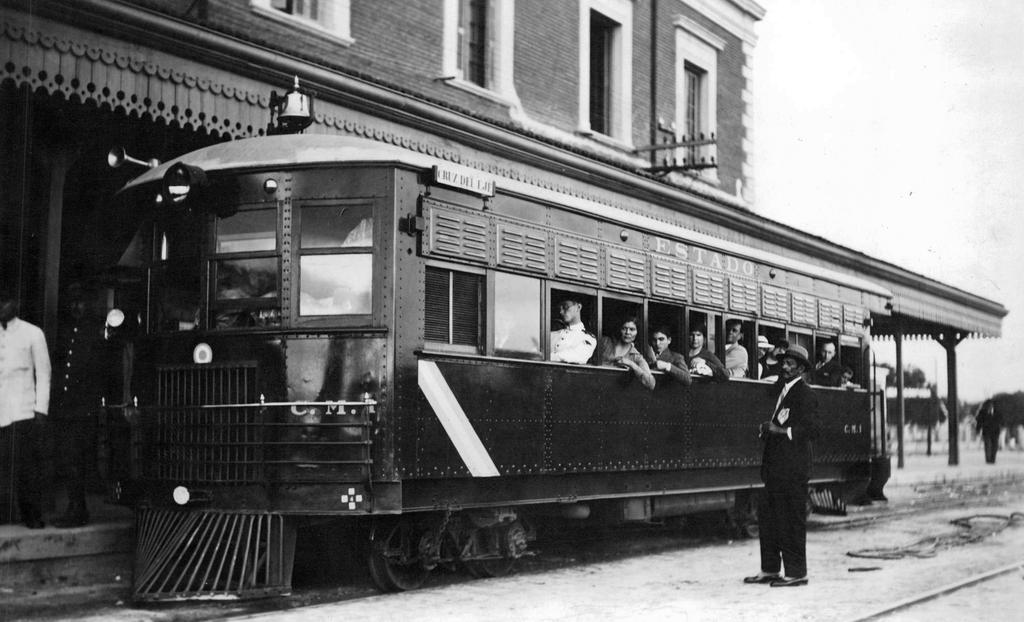
A railcar belonging to the Argentine State Railway (1930)

The rail line was opened on July 2, 1889, to carry both, freight and passengers from Córdoba to Cruz del Eje, operated by British-owned company Córdoba North Western Railway. In 1901 it was taken over by Córdoba Central Railway which operated the branch until 1909 when the company was acquired by the Argentine State Railway.

When the Juan Perón administration nationalised the whole railway network in 1948, the CNR became part of General Belgrano Railway, one of the six divisions of recently formed Ferrocarriles Argentinos.

By the 1960s the line had its golden age when it carried a big number of passengers of Valle de Punilla, as well as tourists coming from the cities of Córdoba, Rosario and Buenos Aires at attractive prices. Nevertheless, the railway was closed in 1977. When the Government of Argentina led by Carlos Menem privatized all the railway lines in the early 1990s, the Córdoba-Cruz del Eje line was transferred to Córdoba Province. The Government of Córdoba stated that they could not finance the service.

As part of a national railway privatisation plan, carried out under the presidency of Carlos Menem, a concession to operate the line was granted to local consortium Grupo Alcázar (that had previously operated the Córdoba Zoo and the Oscar Cabalén racetrack) that took over the railway in 1993 to operate it as a tourist service. Under the trade name "Aero Ruta", the consortium operated the line (also naming it Tren de las Sierras) from Córdoba to Capilla del Monte (100-km length) but services suddenly stopped in 2001. Three years later the Government of Córdoba revoked the contract of concession (by Provincial Decree n° 1274) blaming the concessionary for the bad conditions of the service and poor maintenance.

In 2007 the Province transferred the line to the National Government. On August 10, 2007, the service was partially re-opened, only between cities of Rodríguez del Busto and La Calera. Private consortium Ferrocentral (formed by railway companies Ferrovías and Nuevo Central Argentino) was granted concession to operate the service. The trip took about 40 minutes, served by diesel-electric trains manufactured in Portugal and remodeled by Grupo Emepa in its workshops at Chascomús.

In August 2007 the first phase of the project from Rodríguez del Busto to La Calera was re-opened to the public by Ferrocentral. The National Government invested $10 million to re-open the line. Projects also include to extend services to Cruz del Eje.

One year later the rail line reached Cosquín via the "Quebrada of Bamba".

On June 22, 2009, Alta Córdoba was set up as a terminus, but the concessionary decided to move the terminus to Rodríguez del Busto due to people from poor neighborhoods around the station throwing stones at the trains. In March 2015, this section of the railway was re-opened by the Minister of the Interior and Transport, Florencio Randazzo

In September 2013 State-owned company Trenes Argentinos took over the Tren de las Sierras, operating it up to present days. In March 2015, Alta Córdoba was set up as terminus again, also incorporating the Hospital Neonatal station.

In November 2023, the train extended its route to Capilla del Monte.

== Current operations ==
Tren de las Sierras operates three daily departures in the morning from Alta Córdoba railway station to Cosquín; and three departures from Cosquín to Córdoba, one in the morning and two in the afternoon. End to end travel time is two hours and twenty four minutes.

== Operators ==
Period	Operator	Start/End
1889–1901	Córdoba North Western	Alta Córdoba–Cruz del Eje
1901–1939	Córdoba Central	Alta Córdoba–Cruz del Eje
1939–1977	Ferrocarriles Argentinos	Alta Córdoba–Cruz del Eje
1993–2001	Grupo Alcázar	Alta Córdoba–Capilla del Monte
2004–2013	Ferrocentral	Alta Córdoba (Note: From 2012 to 2015, Rodríguez del Busto was terminus.)–Capilla del Monte
2013–present	Trenes Argentinos	Alta Córdoba–Capilla del Monte

== Gallery ==
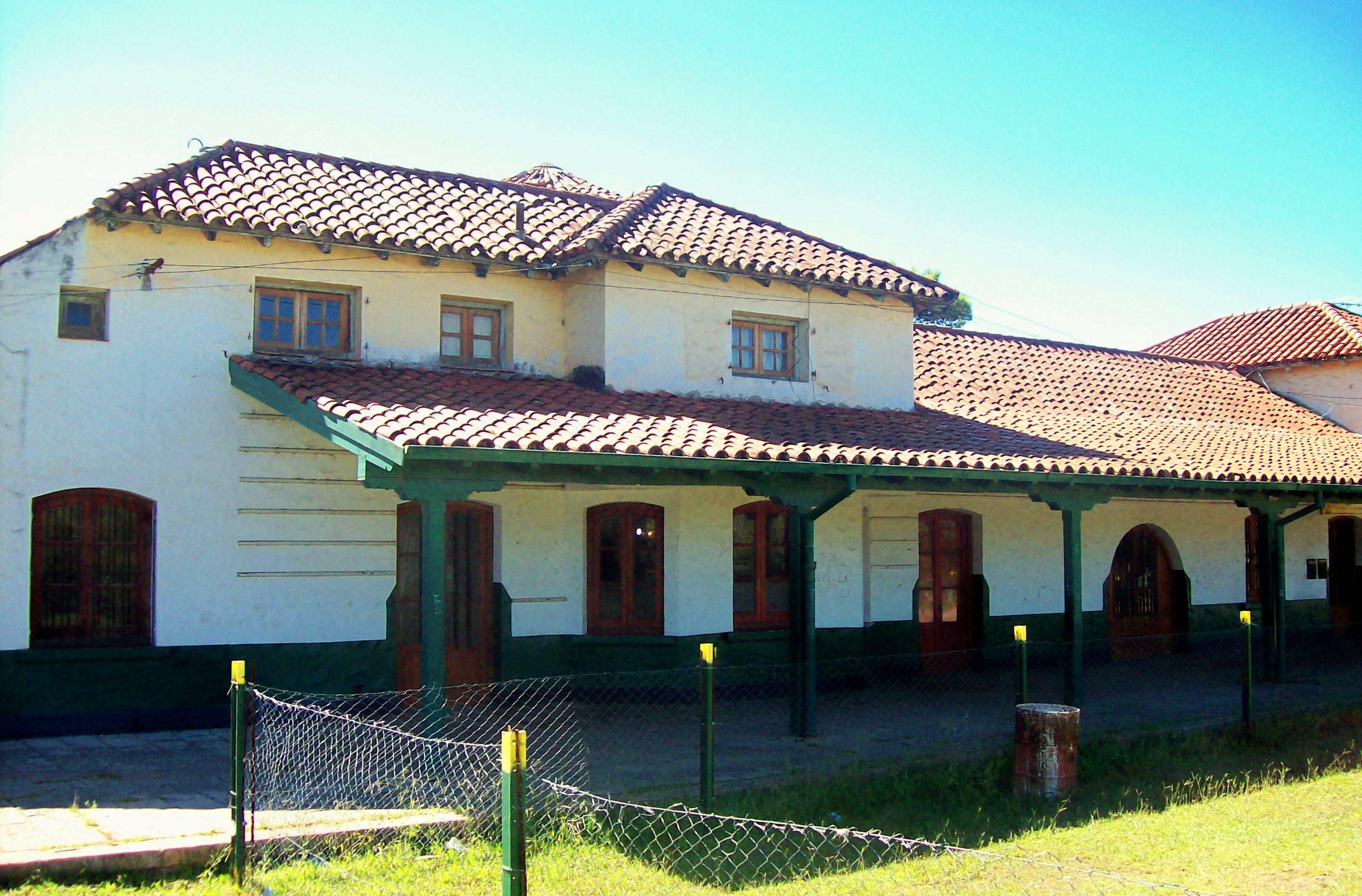
Former Valle Hermoso station, currently a cultural centre

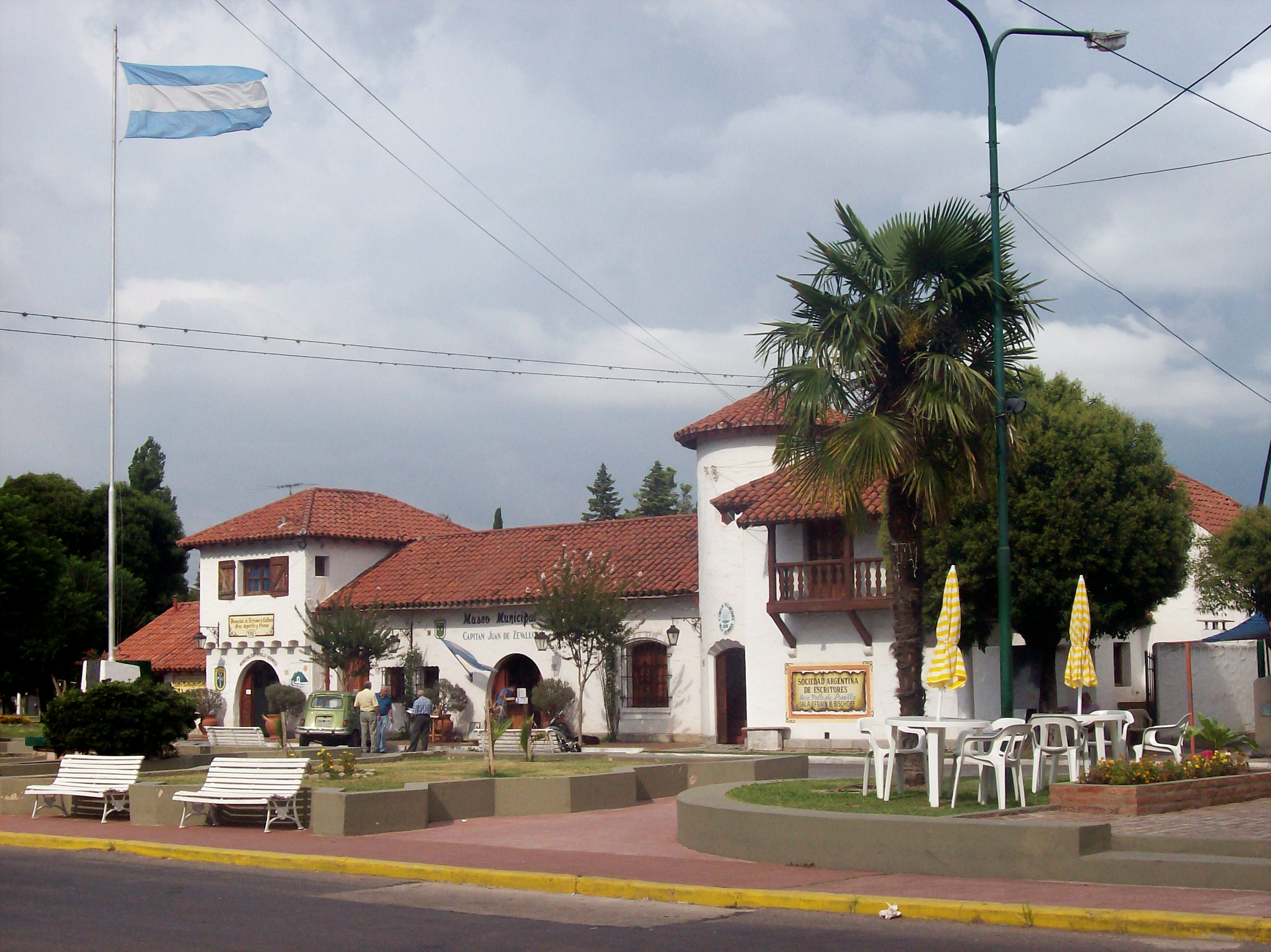
Front view of Valle Hermoso cultural centre

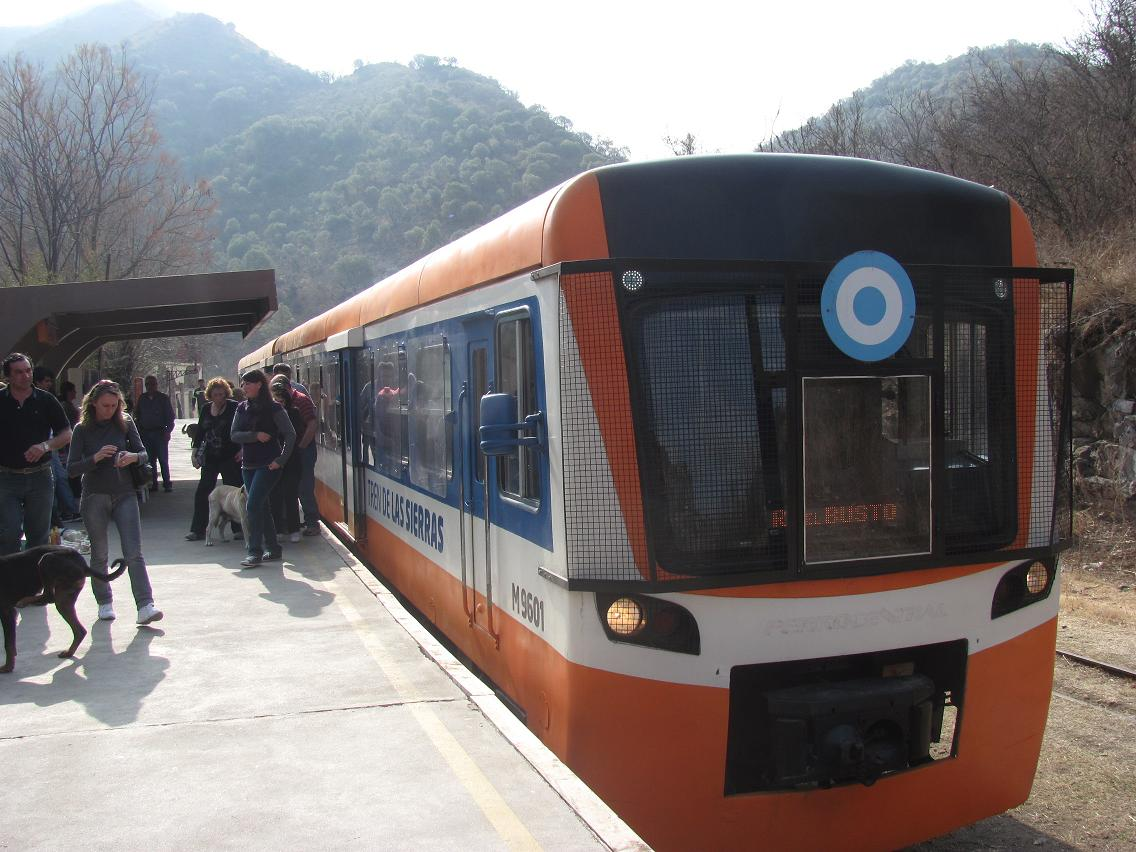
Passengers unloading at Casa Bamba station

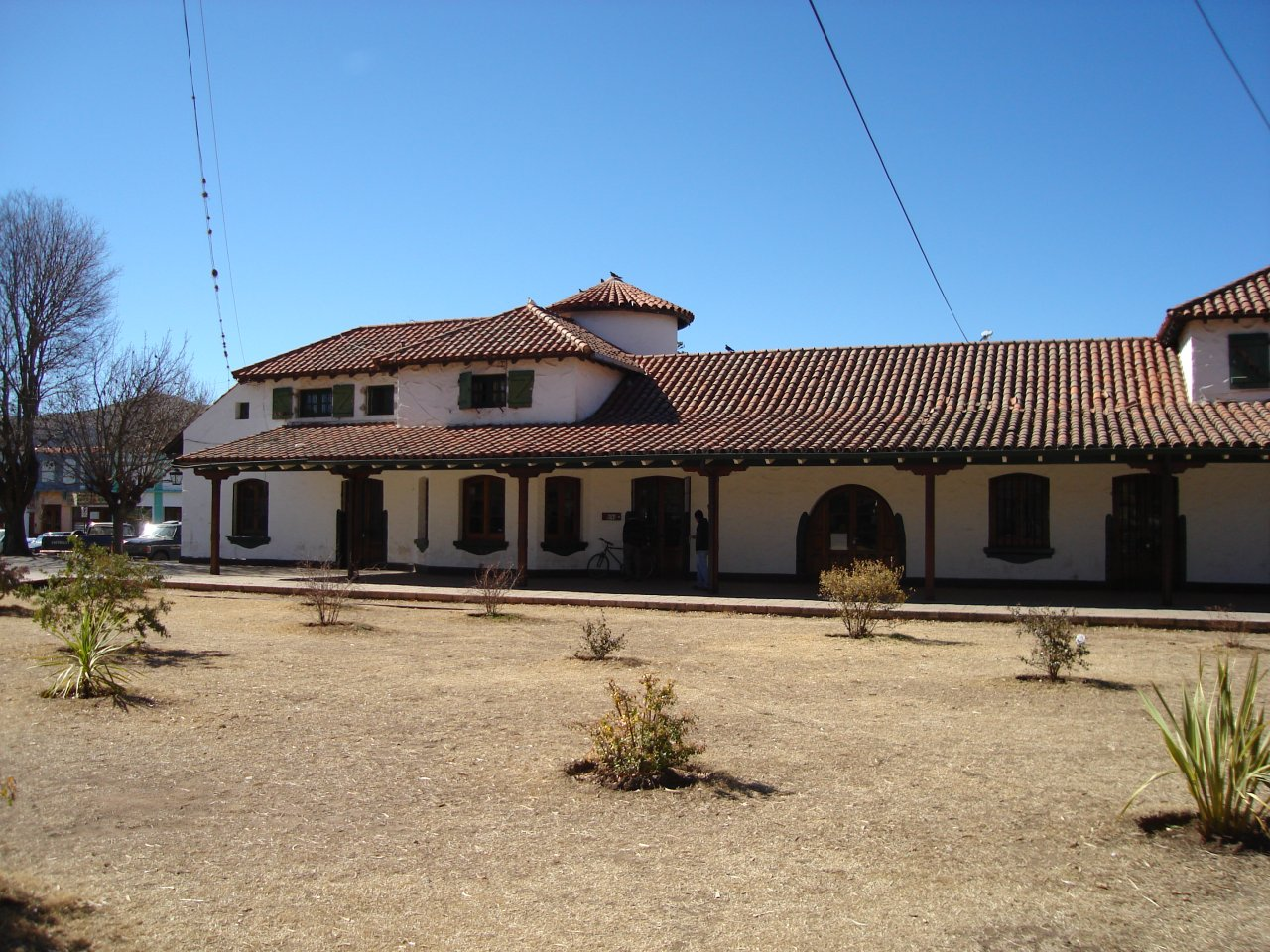
La Cumbre station

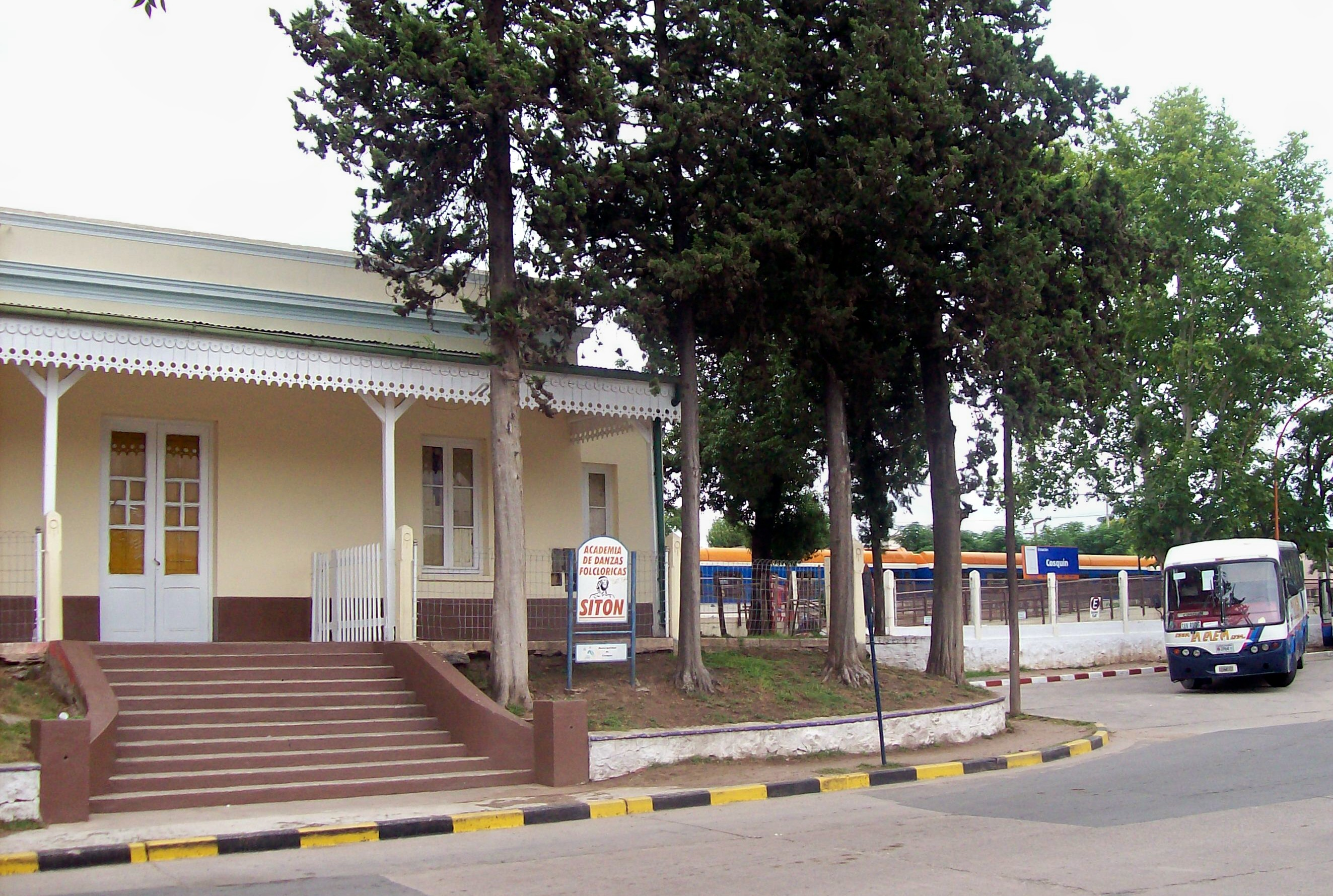
Cosquín, terminus of the line

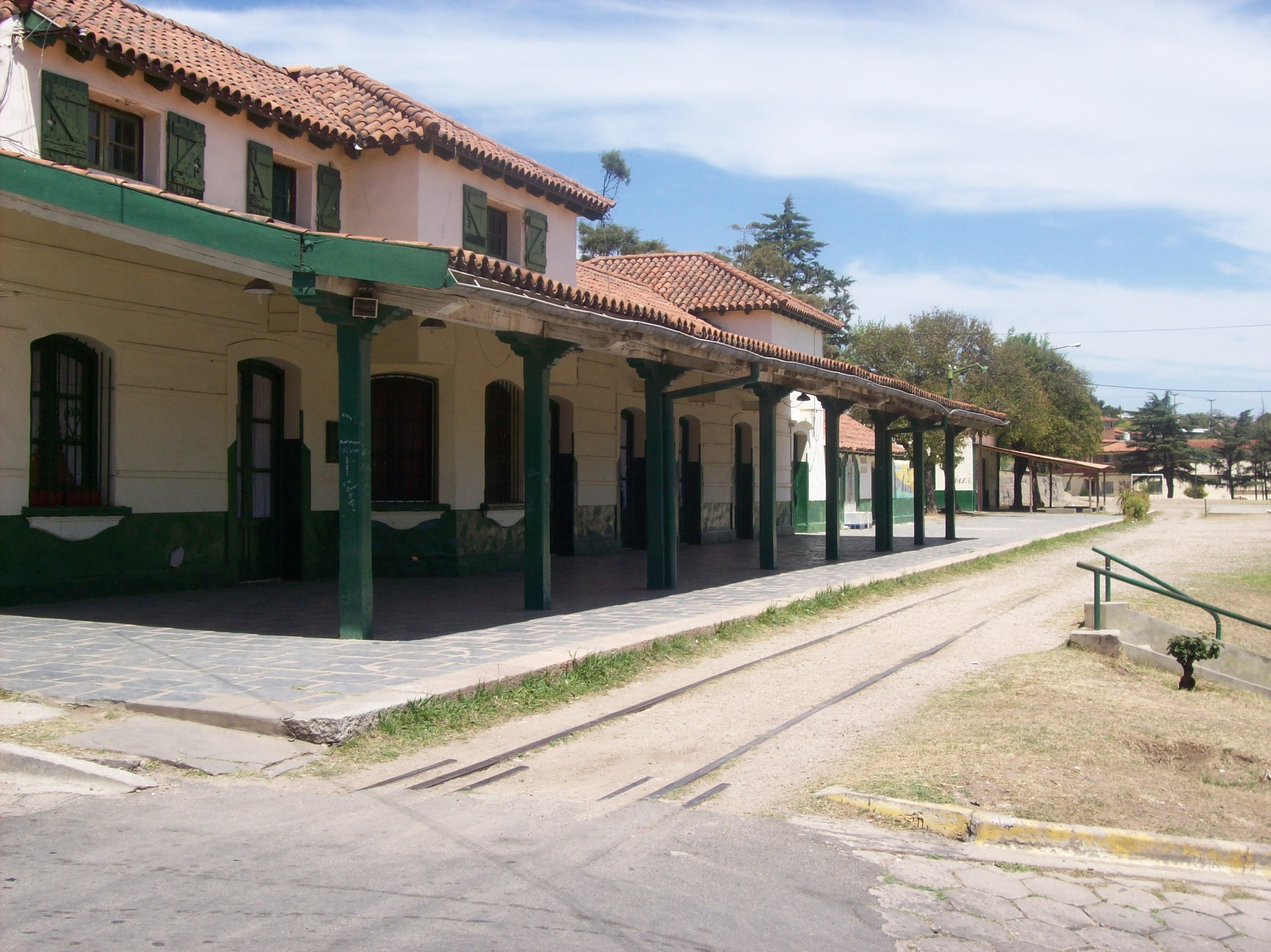
La Falda station in 2009
