= Córdoba North Western Railway =

Former British-owned railway company in Argentina

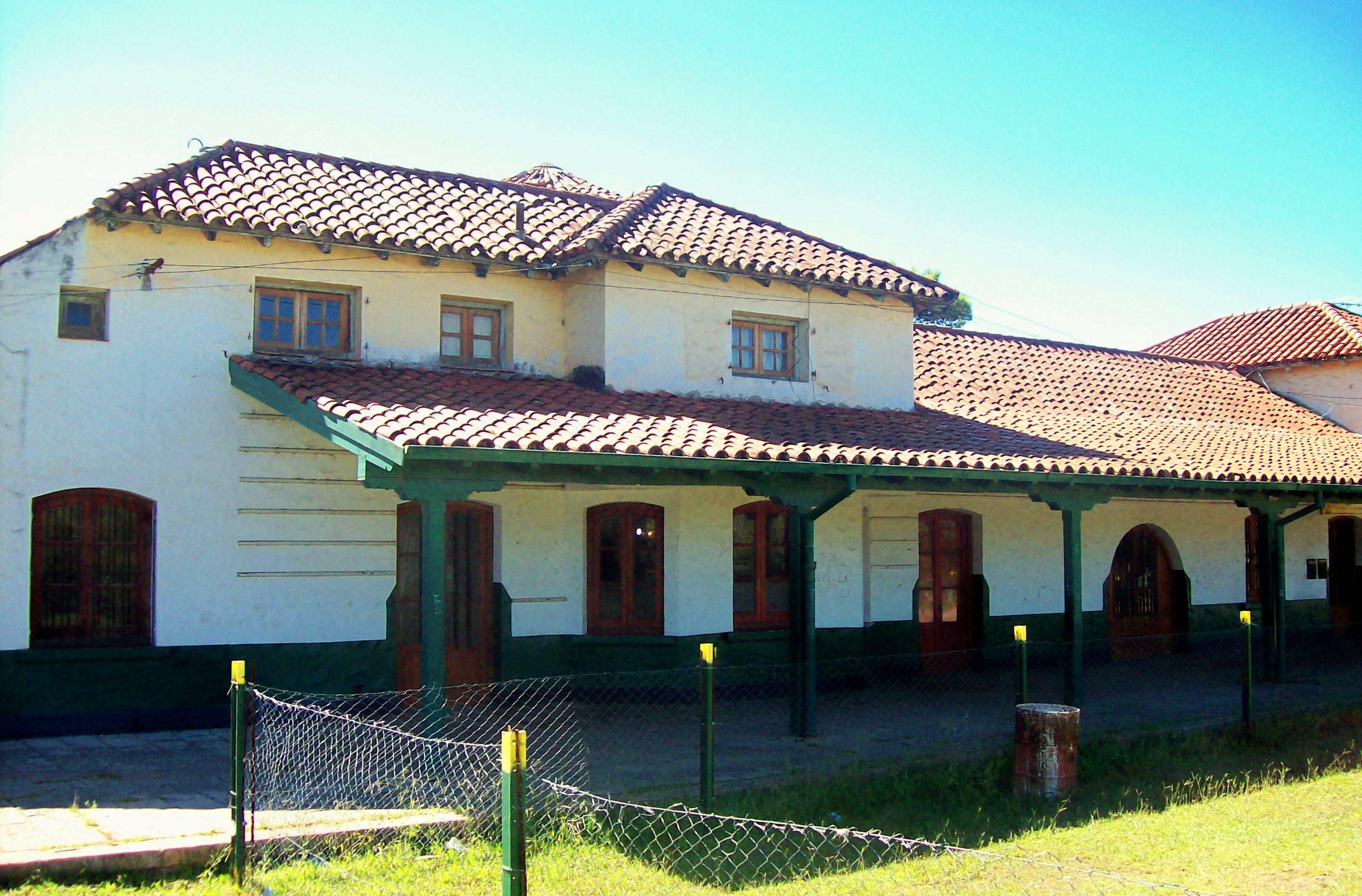
- Valle Hermoso station, currently a cultural center.

Overview
- Native name: Ferrocarril Córdoba y Noroeste
- Status: Defunct company; rail line active as Tren de las Sierras
- Locale: Córdoba Province
- Termini: Córdoba; Cruz del Eje

Service
- Type: Inter-city

History
- Opened: 1889
- Closed: 1901; 124 years ago (merged to Córdoba Central Railway)

Technical
- Line length: 152 km (94 mi)
- Track gauge: 1,000 mm (3 ft 3 3/8 in) metre gauge
Route map
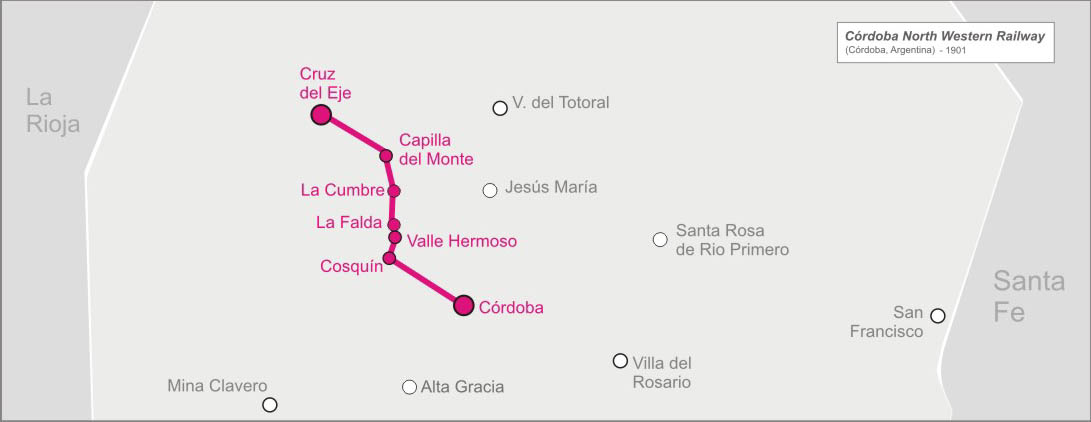

The Córdoba North Western Railway (CNW) (in Spanish: Ferrocarril Córdoba y Noroeste) was a British-owned railway company, founded in 1889, that operated a 1,000 mm (3 ft 3 3/8 in) metre gauge railway network in the Córdoba Province of Argentina. Financial problems forced the sale of the company to the Argentine government in 1909.

== History ==
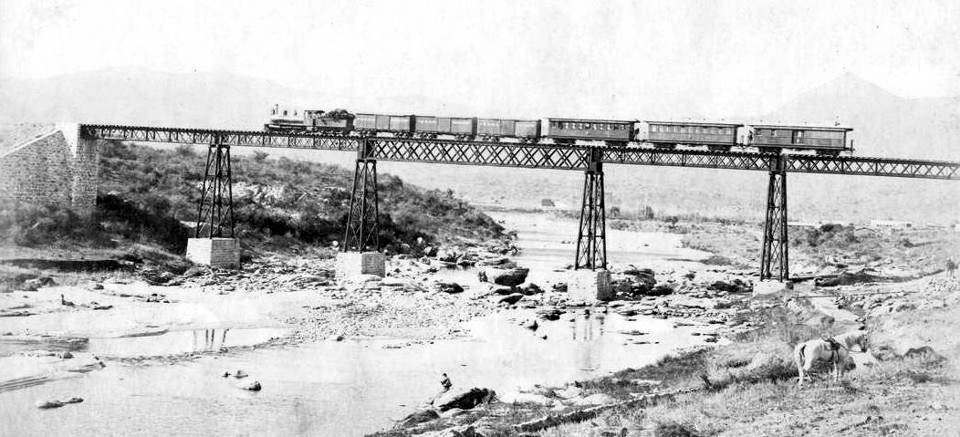
Train crossing a bridge over Cosquín river, c. 1890.

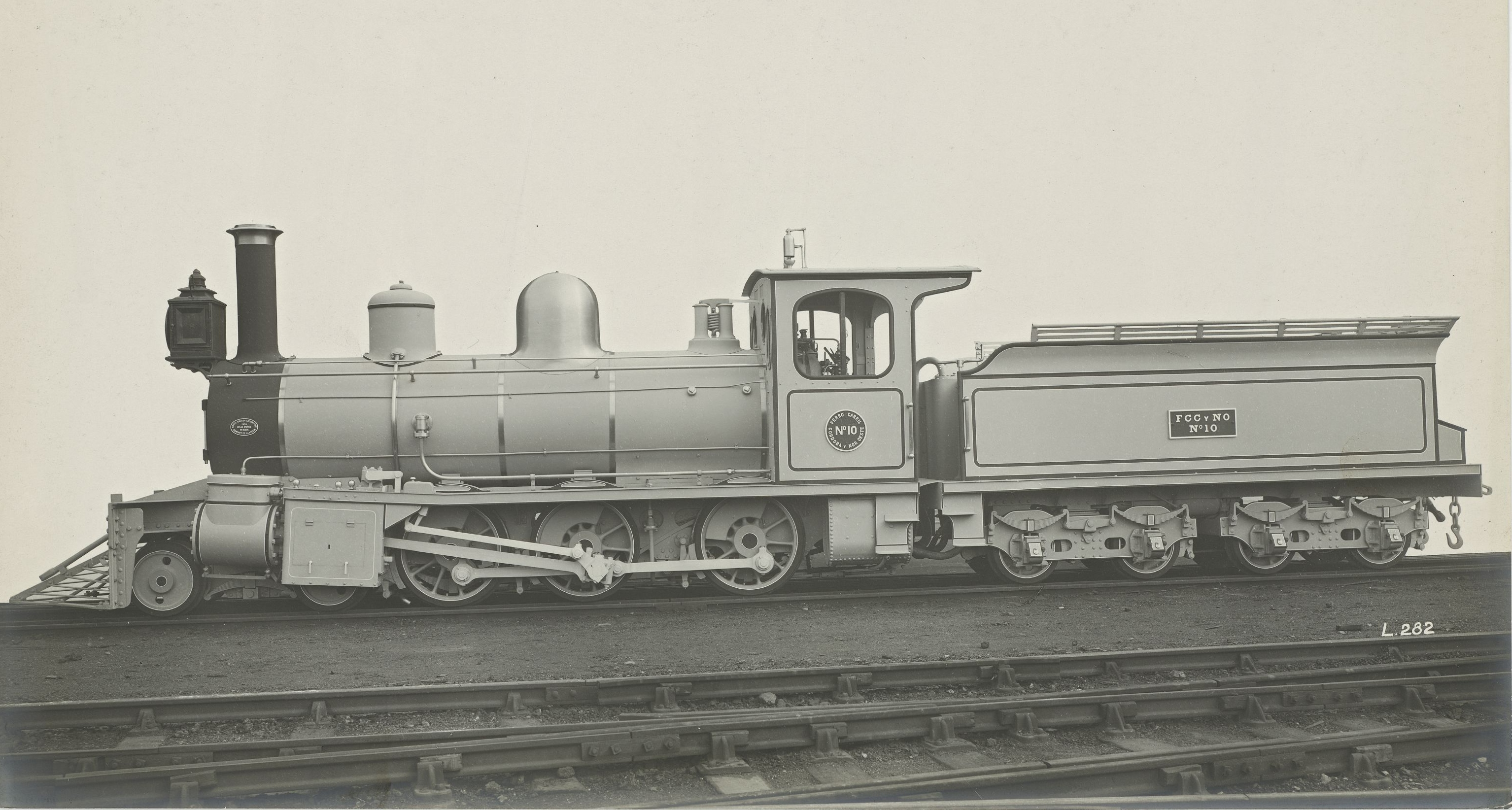
Locomotive No. 10, built 1908 by NBL.

The company was founded in 1889 to take over a concession, originally granted to Otto Bemberg & Co. the previous year, for the construction of a metre gauge line, 152 km long, from the Córdoba to Cruz del Eje via La Calera and Cosquín following the River Primero. The section from Córdoba to La Calera was opened on 30 July 1891 and San Roque was reached later that year on 4 September. The Cosquín to Cruz del Eje section was opened on 10 August 1891 and the line was finally completed when the San Roque to Cosquín section was opened on 7 March 1892.

In 1895, the company owned 8 locomotives, 12 coaches, 4 brake vans, 87 goods wagons.

Following the CNW's financial problems the Córdoba Central Railway took over the working of the line from Córdoba to Cruz del Eje in 1901 and due to further operating losses the CNW was taken over by the Argentine government in 1909 and became part of the State network.

== See also ==
- Tren de las Sierras
- Belgrano Railway
