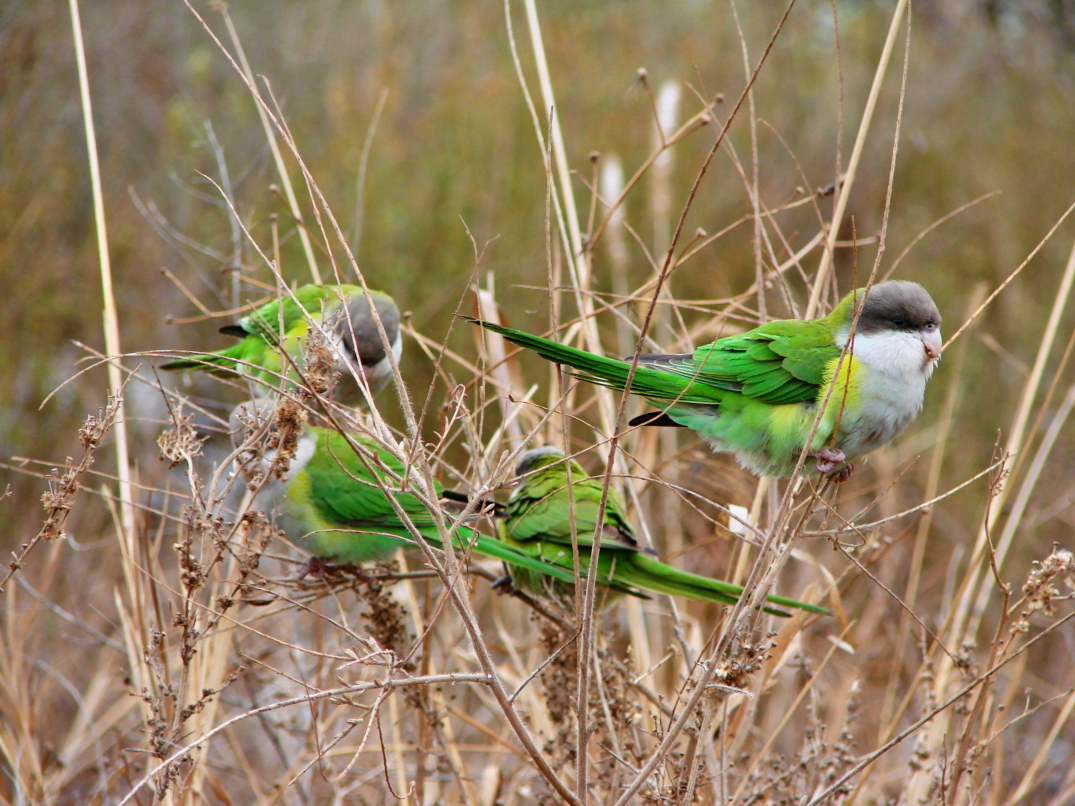
- Grey-hooded parakeets at Capilla del Monte, Córdoba, Argentina

Scientific classification
- Kingdom: Animalia
- Phylum: Chordata
- Class: Aves
- Order: Psittaciformes
- Family: Psittacidae
- Subfamily: Arinae
- Genus: Psilopsiagon; Ridgway, 1912

Species
- See text

= Psilopsiagon =

Genus of birds

Psilopsiagon is a genus of parrot in the family Psittacidae. It contains the following species:

Image	Scientific name	Common name	Distribution
	Psilopsiagon aurifrons	Mountain parakeet	Peru, Chile, Bolivia and Argentina.
	Psilopsiagon aymara	Grey-hooded parakeet	northwestern Argentina and Bolivia
