= Alta Córdoba railway station =

Railway station in Cordoba, Argentina

Coordinates: 31.3983°S 64.1803°W

Alta Córdoba
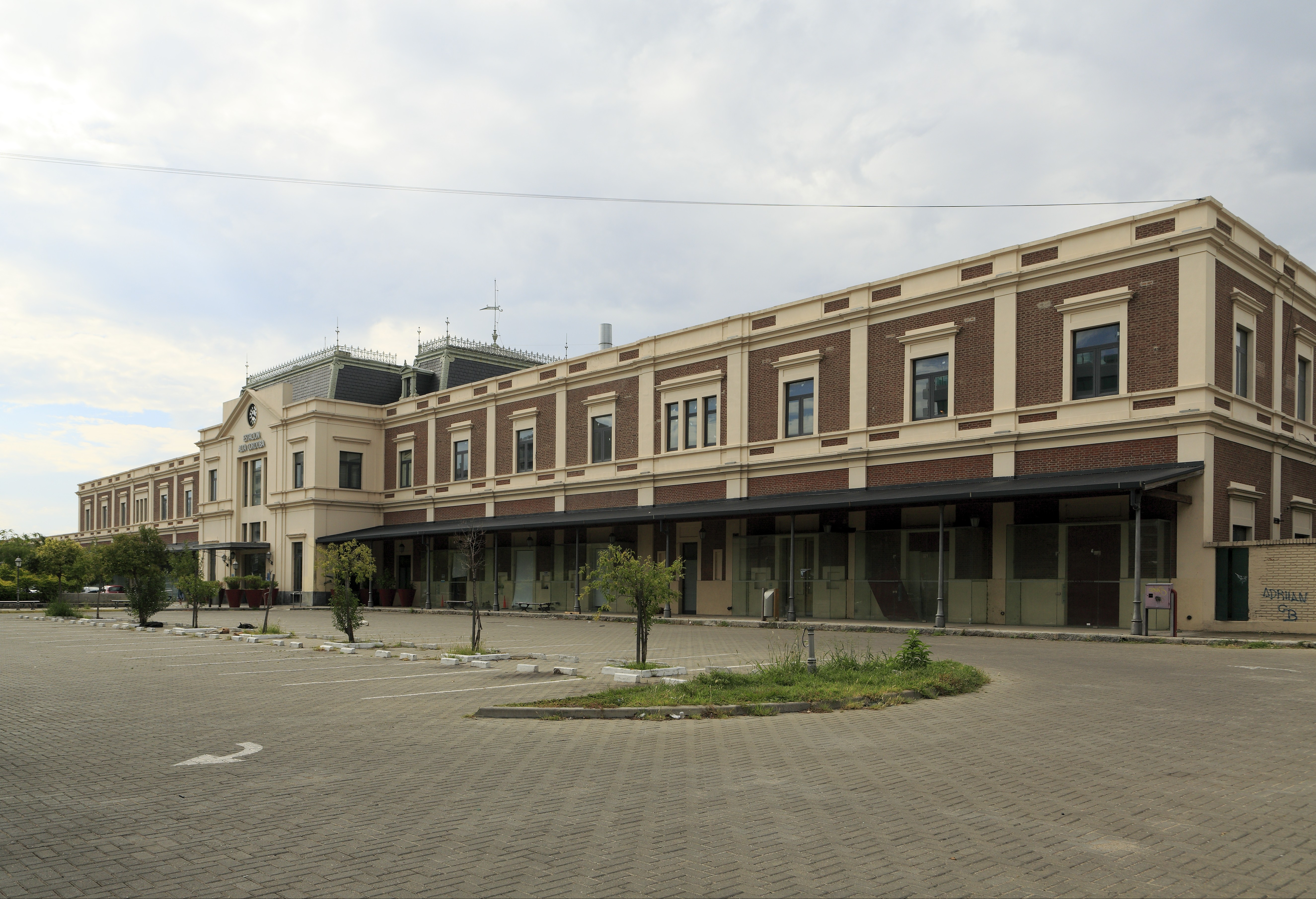

General information
- Location: Gerónimo Cabrera 320, Córdoba; Argentina
- System: Commuter rail
- Owner: Government of Argentina
- Line: Belgrano
- Distance: 700 km (430 mi) from Buenos Aires
- Train operators: Trenes Argentinos

History
- Opened: 1891; 135 years ago

Services
Tren de las Sierras
Location

Alta Córdoba is a railway station located in the Alta Córdoba neighborhood of Córdoba in the province of the same name, Argentina. The station is terminus of the Tren de las Sierras service operated by state-owned Trenes Argentinos. Likewise, another state company, Trenes Argentinos Cargas y Logística, operates freight services there.

== History ==
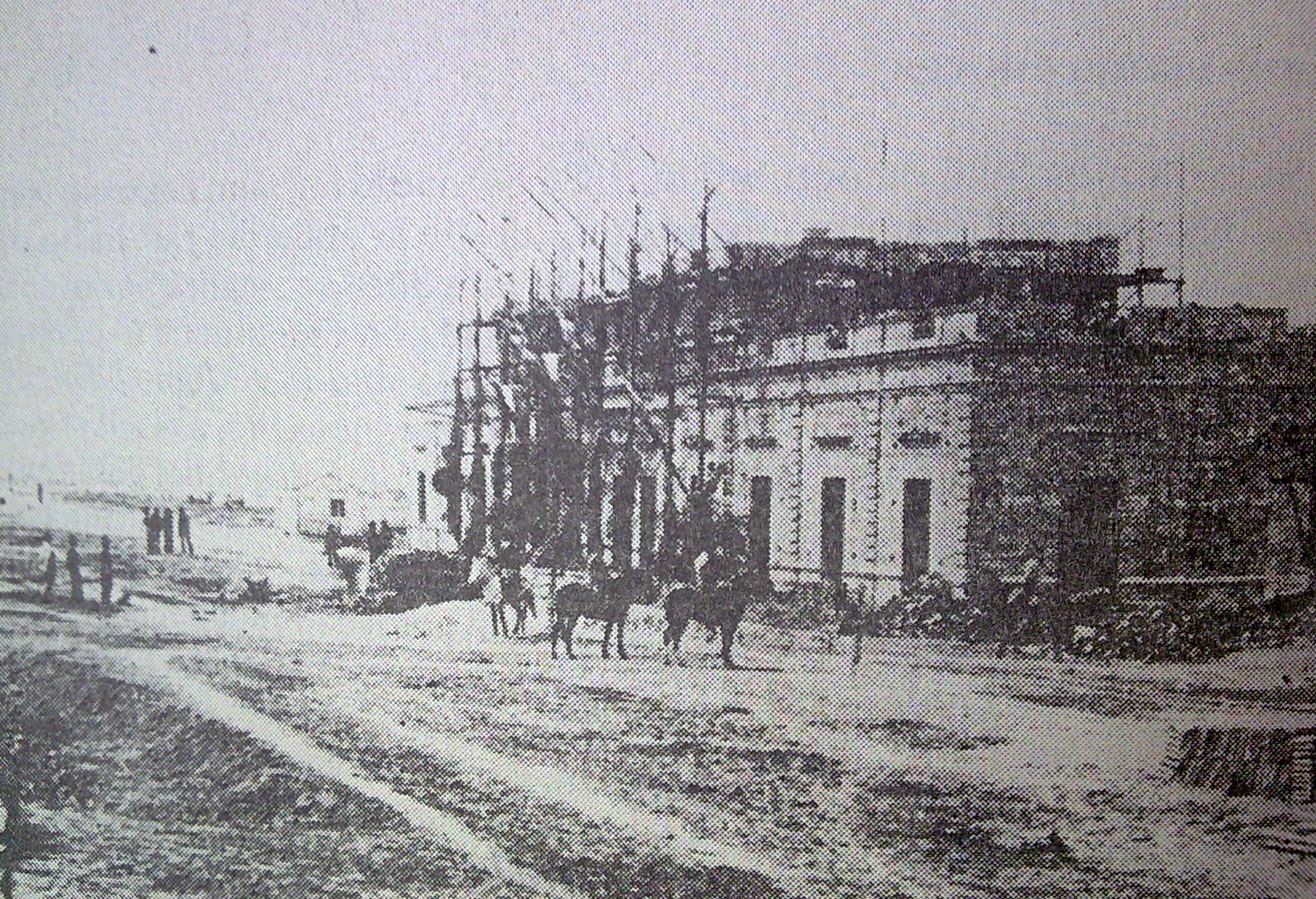
The station under construction, c. 1880s

The station was originally built by the Córdoba Central Railway that operated a line between provinces of Córdoba and Santa Fe, opening the first section in 1888. In 1938, the Córdoba Central Railway (with some financial problems) was taken over by the Argentine state, being added to the Central Northern Railway network.

When the Juan Perón's administration nationalised the whole railway network in 1948, the Central Northern Railway (and therefore the Alta Córdoba station) became part of General Belgrano Railway, one of the six divisions of recently formed Ferrocarriles Argentinos.

By the 1960s the line had its golden age when it carried a big number of passengers from Valle de Punilla, as well as tourists coming from the cities of Córdoba, Rosario and Buenos Aires at attractive prices. Nevertheless, the Córdoba-Cruz del Eje line was closed in 1977. When the Government of Argentina led by Carlos Menem privatized all the railway lines in the early 1990s, the Córdoba-Cruz del Eje line was transferred to Córdoba Province. The Government of Córdoba stated that they could not finance the service.

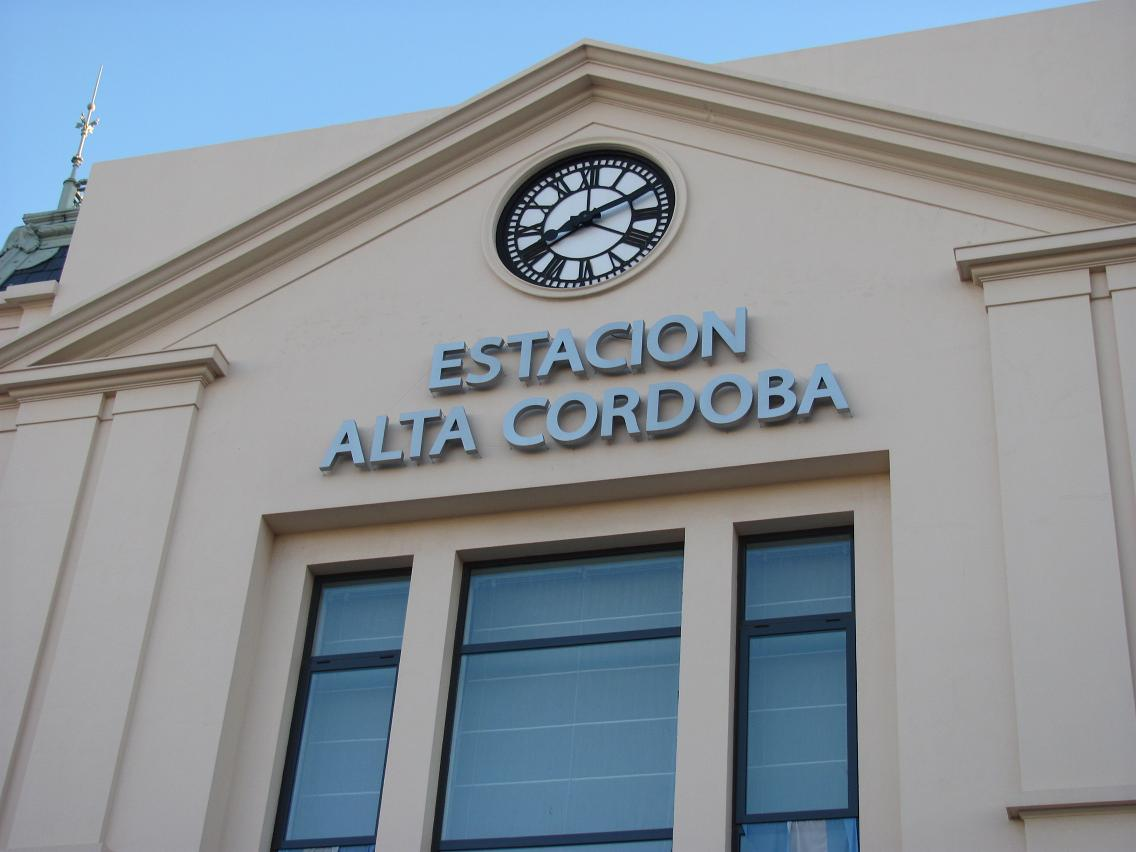
Upper facade with its watch and sign

As part of a national railway privatisation plan, carried out under the presidency of Carlos Menem, a concession to operate the line was granted to local consortium Grupo Alcázar, which operated the line (also naming it Tren de las Sierras) from Córdoba to Capilla del Monte (100-km length) but services suddenly stopped in 2001. Three years later the Government of Córdoba revoked the contract of concession (by Provincial Decree n° 1274) blaming the concessionary for the bad conditions of the service and poor maintenance.

Private consortium Ferrocentral granted concession to operate the line, starting in 2004. In 2007 the Province transferred the line to the National Government. On August 10, 2007, the service was partially re-opened, only between the cities of Rodríguez del Busto and La Calera.

On June 22, 2009, Alta Córdoba was set up as terminus, but the concessionary decided to move terminus to Rodríguez del Busto due to people from poor neighborhoods around the station used to throw stones to the trains. In March 2015, this section of the railway was re-opened by the Minister of the Interior and Transport, Florencio Randazzo

With Alta Córdoba station virtually abandoned, the Municipality of Córdoba requested the National Government permission to move the City Council to the station building.

In September 2013 state-owned company Trenes Argentinos took over the Tren de las Sierras. In March 2015, Alta Córdoba was set up as terminus again.

=== Historic operators ===
Company	Period
(United Kingdom) Córdoba Central	1891–1938
(Argentina) Central Northern	1938–1948
(Argentina) Ferrocarriles Argentinos	1948–1993
(Argentina) Grupo Alcázar (Note: This company named the service "Tren de las Sierras".)	1993–2001
(Argentina) Ferrocentral	2004–2013
(Argentina) Trenes Argentinos	2013–present

== See also ==
- Tren de las Sierras
- La Calera railway station
