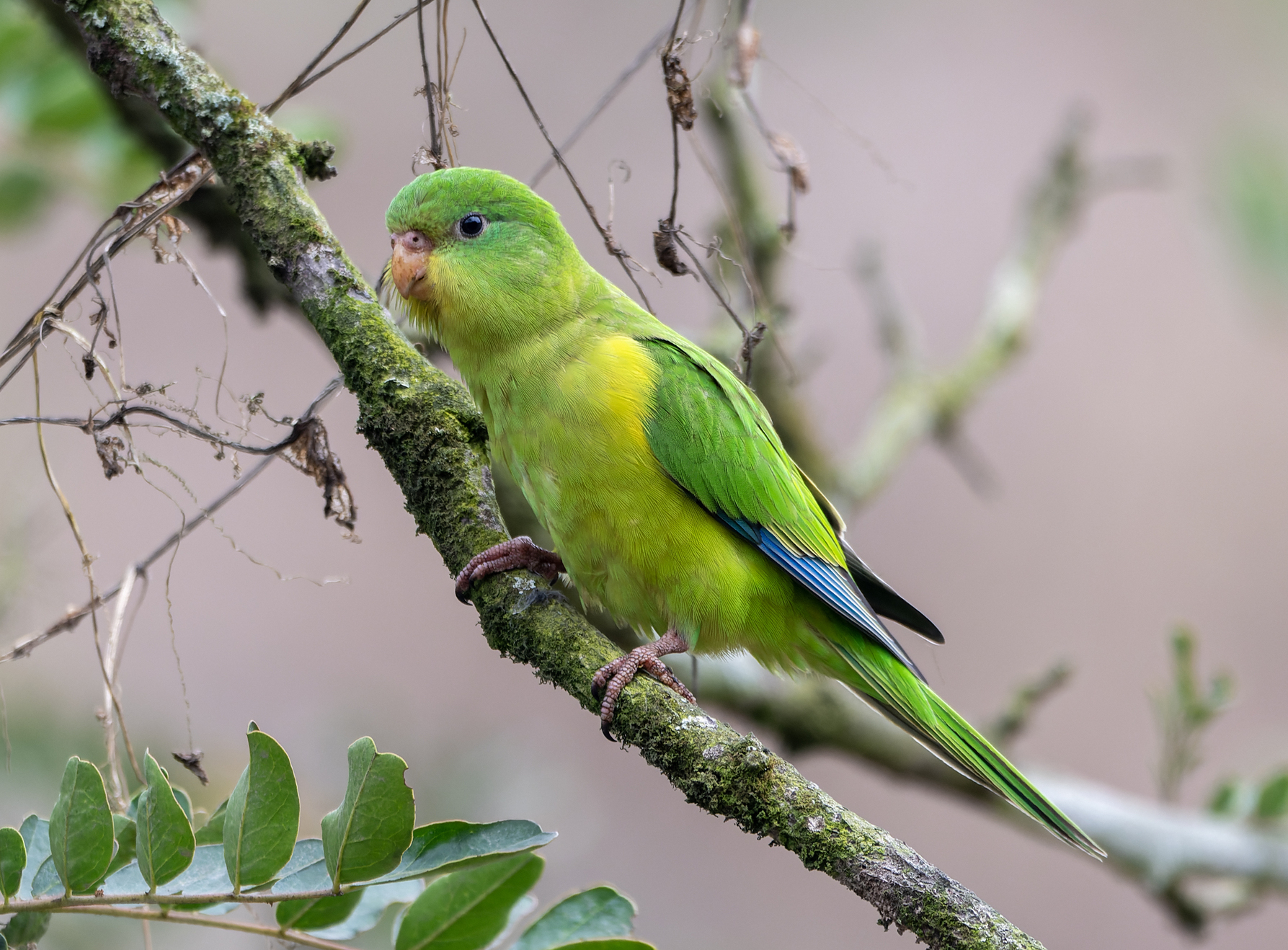

Conservation status
- Least Concern (IUCN 3.1)

Scientific classification
- Kingdom: Animalia
- Phylum: Chordata
- Class: Aves
- Order: Psittaciformes
- Family: Psittacidae
- Genus: Psilopsiagon
- Species: P. aurifrons

Binomial name
- Psilopsiagon aurifrons (Lesson, RP, 1831)

Synonyms
- Bolborhynchus aurifrons (Lesson, 1830)

= Mountain parakeet =

Species of bird

The mountain parakeet (Psilopsiagon aurifrons), also known as the golden-fronted parakeet, is a species of parrot, one of two in the genus Psilopsiagon within the family Psittacidae. It is found in the Puna grassland. Its natural habitat is subtropical or tropical high-altitude shrubland. Four subspecies are recognised.

== Subspecies ==
There are four subspecies:

- P. a. aurifrons – the coast and western slopes of the Andes in central Peru
- P. a. margaritae – the Andean slopes of southern Peru, Bolivia, northern Chile and northwestern Argentina
- P. a. robertsi – the Marañón Valley in north central Peru
- P. a. rubrirostris – the Andean slopes of northwestern Argentina, between Catamarca and Córdoba, and southern Chile.

== Description ==
This small parrot reaches about 18 cm (7 in) in length and weighs about 45 g (1.6 oz). The male of the nominate subspecies, P. a. aurifrons, has a green head, mantle, back and tail. The otherwise green primary feathers have blue outer webs. The face, throat and breast are yellow gradually fading to a yellowish-green belly. The eye is brown and the bill horn-coloured. The female is similar to the male but has a yellow forehead, and the juvenile resembles the female but has a shorter tail.

Both sexes of P. a. margaritae are similar to the female P. a. aurifrons but are larger with shorter tails and the colour of the female's bill is grey. P. a. rubrirostris is a similar colour to P. a. margaritae but the head, breast and belly are a rather darker shade of green tinged with blue. The male's bill is pinkish-buff and the female's grey. The male and female P. a. robertsi resemble P. a. aurifrons but the belly is a darker shade of green and the chin and throat brighter yellow.

== Distribution and habitat ==
The mountain parakeet is found in the Andes at altitudes between 1,000 and 4,500 metres (3,300 and 14,800 ft). Its range includes Peru, Chile, Bolivia and Argentina. Its typical habitat is among vegetation near rivers, on bushy slopes, among scrub, on rough grassland with cacti and brush and agricultural land. It also occurs in man-made environments such as parks and gardens. The four subspecies occupy separate, non-overlapping parts of the range. This species does not migrate, but the birds move to higher altitudes in summer and lower ones in winter.

== Biology ==
The mountain parakeet is a sociable bird and forages on the ground and in scrub for buds, berries and seeds of such plants as Fabiana densa, Lepidophyllum and Adesmia. Breeding takes place at different times of year in different parts of the range. A clutch of three to six eggs is laid in a hole or crevice in a rocky outcrop, cliff face or river bank.

== Status ==
The mountain parakeet has a very wide range and is fairly common in suitable habitat over much of that range. The IUCN has listed its conservation status as being of "least concern".
