= Bartolomé Jaimes =

Spanish nobleman

Captain Bartolomé Jaimes

Mayor of Córdoba, Argentina
- In office 1581–1582
- Monarch: Philip II of Spain
- Preceded by: ?
- Succeeded by: ?

Fiel Ejecutor of Cabildo of Córdoba In office 1591–1592 1599–1600

Personal details
- Born: Bartolome González y Jaimes Sánchez c. 1522 Ayamonte, Spain
- Died: November 14, 1603 Córdoba, Argentina
- Resting place: Cathedral of Córdoba
- Occupation: conquistador politician army
- Profession: Army officer

Military service
- Allegiance: Spanish Empire
- Branch/service: Spanish Army
- Years of service: 1540s–1603
- Rank: Captain
- Battles/wars: Spanish conquest of the Inca Empire; Arauco War

Bartolomé Jaimes (c. 1522 – 14 November 1603) was a Spanish nobleman who served in the conquest of Peru, Chile and Tucumán. He participated in the founding of the city of Córdoba by Jerónimo Luis de Cabrera.

== Biography ==
He was born in Ayamonte, Huelva (Spain), the son of Alonso González Jaimes and Marina Sánchez, belonging to a noble family originally from Andalusia.

Jaimes actively participated in the Spanish Conquest of the Americas. He possibly arrived in Peru around the year 1540. In 1547, he participated in the Battle of Huarina, under the command of General Diego Centeno against the hosts of Gonzalo Pizarro. He accompanied Pedro de Valdivia in the Conquest of Chile and participated with great value in the Arauco War.

Bartolomé Jaimes also participated in the Conquest of Tucumán, and attended the foundation of Santiago del Estero by Francisco de Aguirre in 1553, and of Córdoba by Jerónimo Luis de Cabrera. He served as Alcalde of Córdoba in 1581, and was elected as Regidor of the Cabildo in 1575, 1577, 1579 and 1584. His last prominent public post, was as Fiel Ejecutor in 1590 and 1599.

On May 17, 1579, Bartolomé Jaimes received land grants in Córdoba, including the village of Ansenuza, and Caroya, where he requested permission to establish a cattle ranch. He made his will on the same day of his death, on November 14, 1603, being buried in the Iglesia Mayor de Córdoba.

== Family ==
Bartolomé Jaimes was married four times to native women of South America. His wives Catalina and Ana, were Mapuche, and Isabel, born in Catamarca was of Diaguita origin. His last wife was Luisa Martín, a mixed Indian, daughter of Alonso Martín del Arroyo, a Spanish politician, who served as Procurador of Santiago del Estero.

His descendant, Antonio Jaimes (born in Córdoba) was the founder of the Jaime family in Buenos Aires. In 1692, he was married in the Buenos Aires Cathedral to María de la Rosa Fernández, born in Buenos Aires. His son, Juan Jaimes Fernández was married to Juana Chiclana Navarro, daughter of Diego Chiclana (soldier) and Luisa Navarro Estebáñez de Cevallos, belonging to a noble family from Buenos Aires of Basque origin (related to Coutinho de Mendoza).

Antonio Jaimes served as soldier of the Presidio de Buenos Aires in 1690s and 1710s. He was possibly the great-grandson of Juan Maldonado and Lucía González Jaimes Díaz (daughter of Bartolomé Jaimes). His granddaughter, Josepha Lucía Jaimes Chiclana was married to Joseph Antonio Roberto. This family (Roberto Jaimes) was related to numerous Argentinean families, including the family of Casimiro Alegre, alcalde and Captain of Militias of San Vicente, Buenos Aires.

His most renowned descendant (non-direct line) was Domingo Faustino Sarmiento, President of the Argentine Republic between 1868 and 1864. The surname Jaimes or Jaime is originally from Aragon. Ancient sources indicated that the surname came from the knight Ruiz Perez de Jaimes (descendant of James I of Aragon), who had participated in the Granada War.
