= El Cajón Dam (Argentina) =

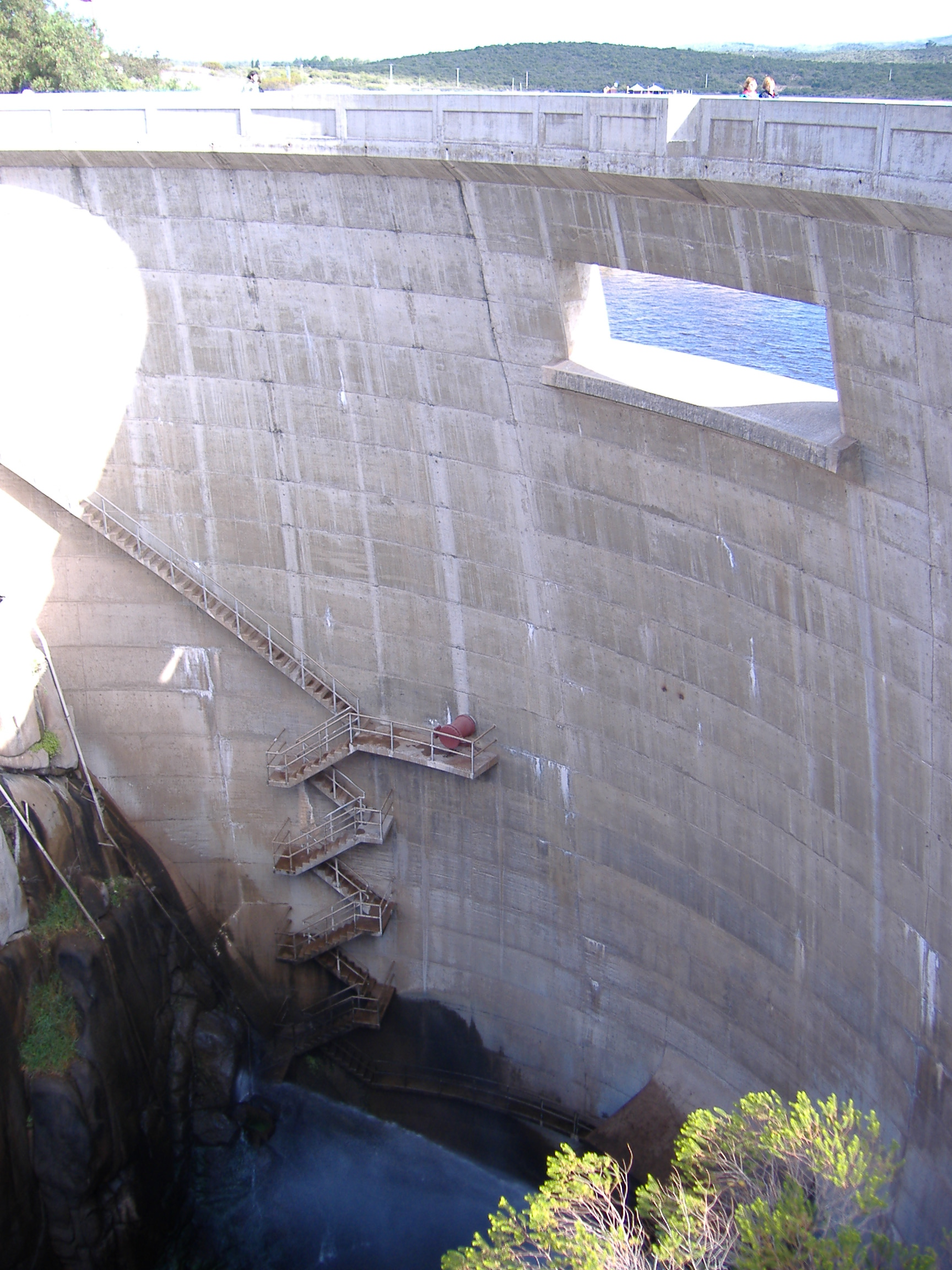
- Interactive map of El Cajón Dam
- Official name: Dique El Cajón
- Location: Córdoba, Argentina
- Coordinates: 30°51′12″S 64°33′01″W
- Construction began: 1987
- Opening date: 1993
- Construction cost: US$800 million

Dam and spillways
- Impounds: Dolores River
- Height: 39 m (128 ft)

Reservoir
- Total capacity: 8,000,000 m^{3} (280,000,000 ft^{3})
- Surface area: 1.45–1.8 km^{2} (0.6–0.7 mi^{2})

El Cajón Dam (Spanish: Dique El Cajón) is a dam in Capilla del Monte, Córdoba, Argentina. It was built on the course of the Dolores River, at about 910 m (2,986 ft) above mean sea level. The wall of the dam is 39 m (128 ft) tall and it creates a reservoir with a surface area of 1.45–1.8 km^{2} (0.6–0.7 mi^{2}) and a volume of 8,000,000 m^{3} (280,000,000 ft^{3}).

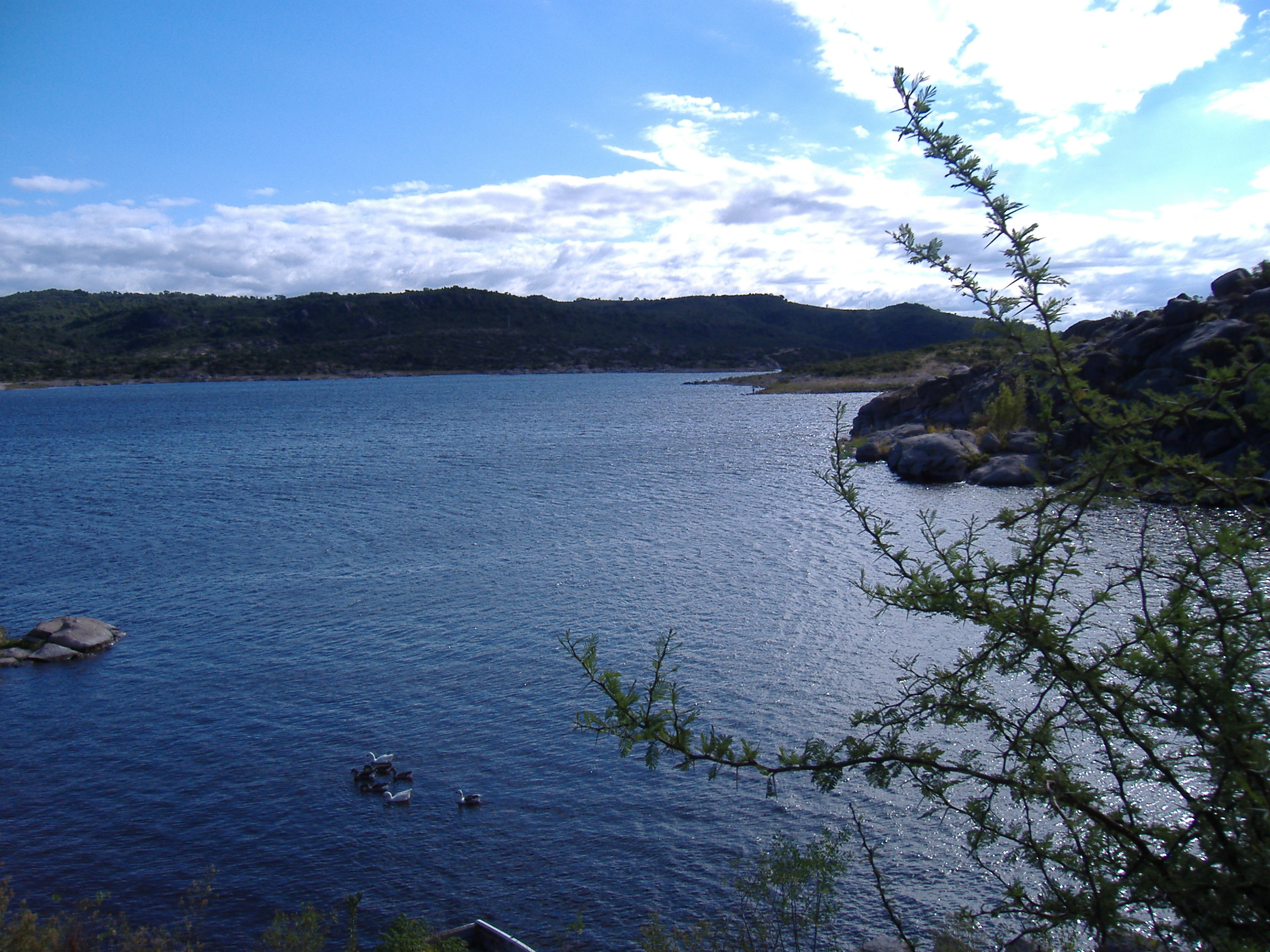
A view of the reservoir.

The construction of El Cajón Dam started in the 1970s but the dam was finally finished and inaugurated in 1993. It is made of concrete and lies on granite terrain. The dam is used as a reservoir of fresh water, to regulate the flow of the river, for fishing (carp and silverside), sailing, canoeing, and windsurfing. The dam cost a total of approximately USD 800 million to construct.
