= Uritorco =

Mountain in Argentina

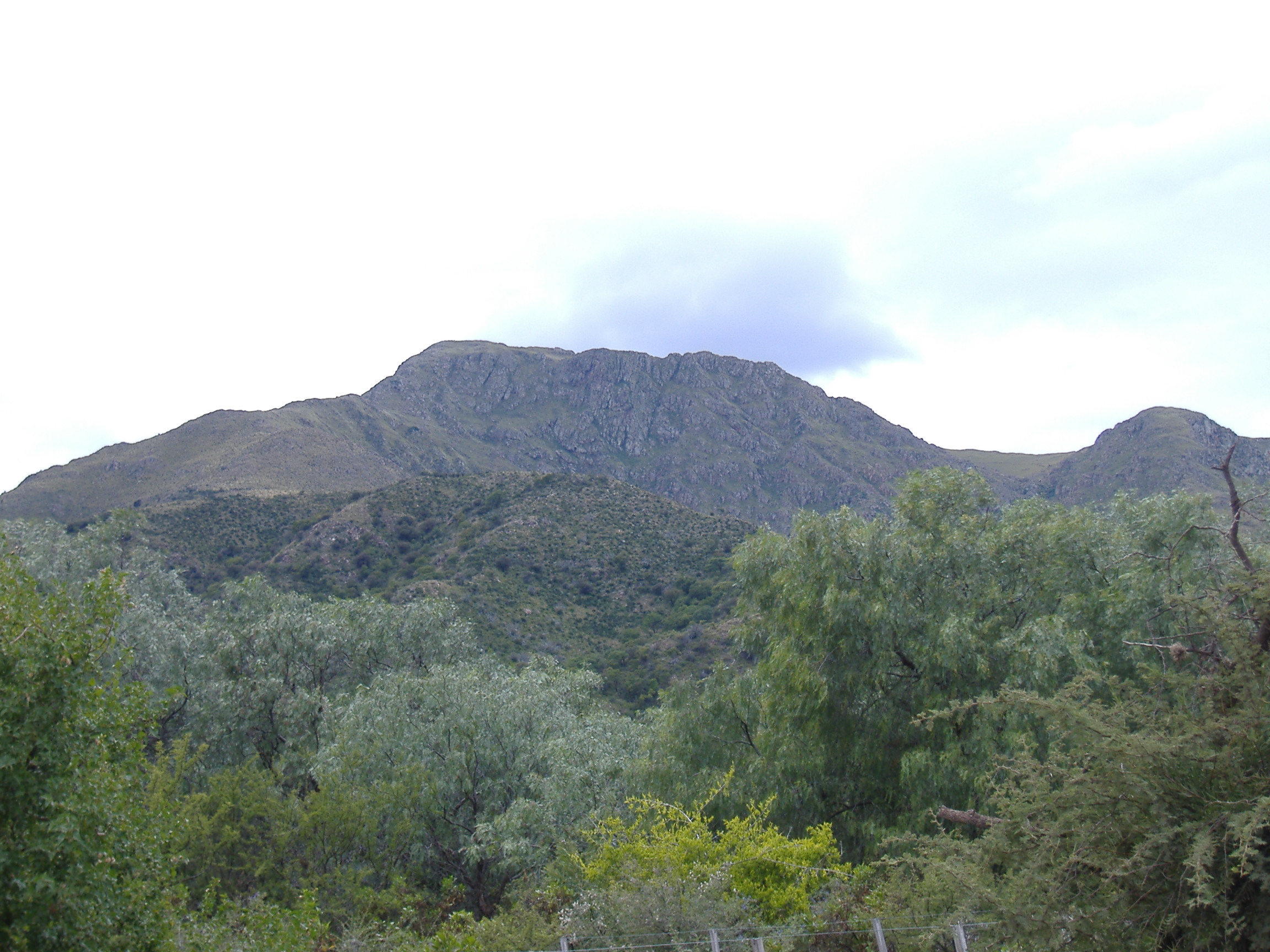
- Mount Uritorco, as seen from Capilla del Monte

Highest point
- Elevation: 1,949 m (6,394 ft)
- Coordinates: 30°50′39″S 64°28′34″W

Geography
- Location within Argentina
- Location: Córdoba, Argentina
- Parent range: Sierras Chicas

Climbing
- Easiest route: Hike

Cerro Uritorco is a mountain (cerro) located next to the Calabalumba River, in the city of Capilla del Monte, in the northwest of the province of Córdoba, Argentina. It is the highest peak of the Sierras Chicas mountain range. It is 3 km (1.9 miles) away from the city center and its summit is at 1,949 m (6,394 ft) above mean sea level. The name Uritu urqu means "Male Hill" in Santiago del Estero Quichua, which is, however, not the aboriginal Comechingón language.

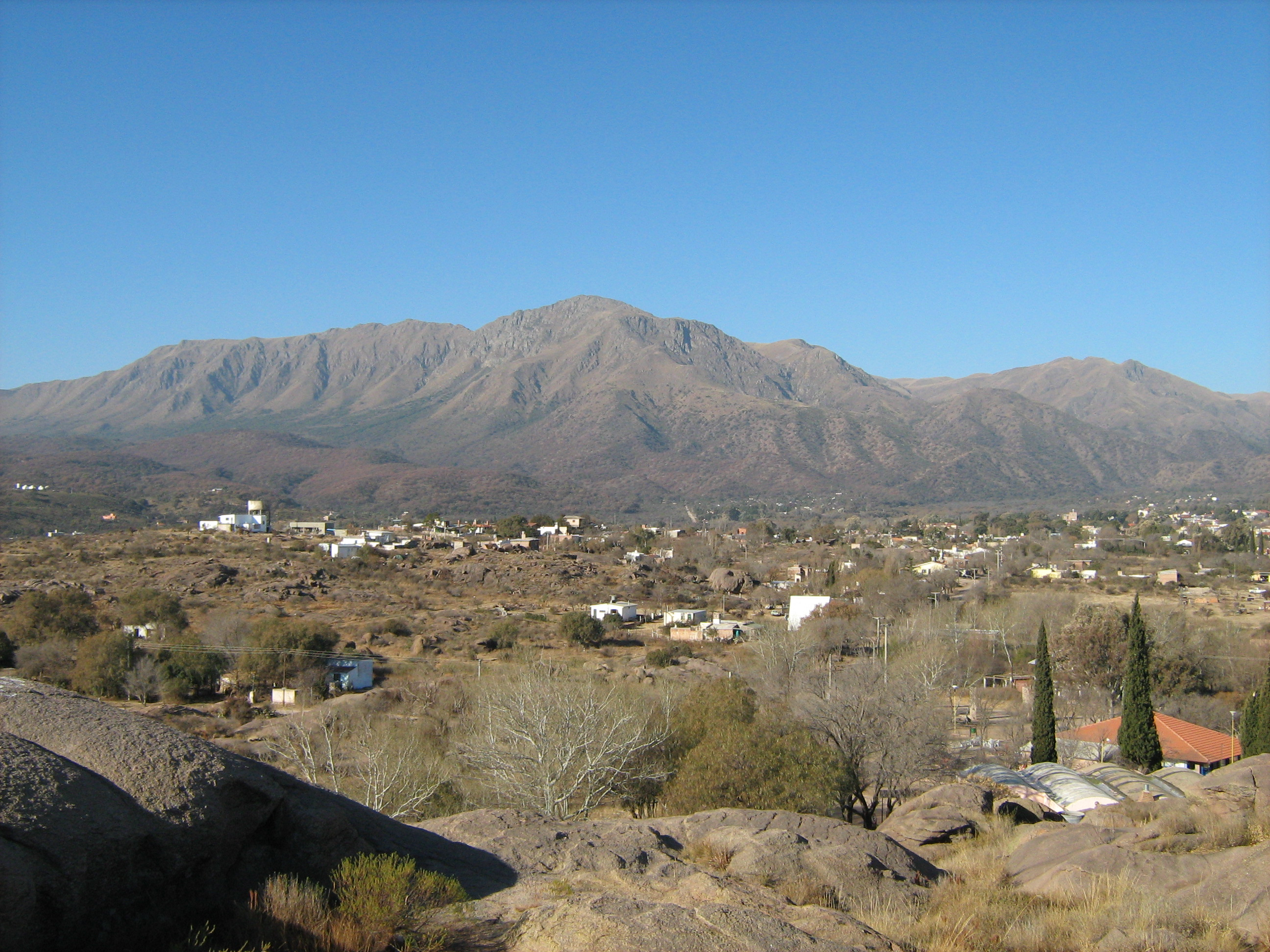
Cerro Uritorco seen from El Zapato

Cerro Uritorco is under a private administration and it can be accessed by the public for a fee. It is considered a medium-difficulty ascent, taking around three hours to reach the top, provided the appropriate hiking path is followed.

On December 21, 2012, the mountain was closed, since a mass suicide had been proposed on Facebook to take place there due to the 2012 phenomenon.

Multiple purported UFO sightings have been reported at Cerro Uritorco. The mountain is believed to be a center of extraterrestrial activity and home to an underground city named Erks, which is inhabited by extraterrestrial beings. The mysticism around the alleged UFO activity in the mountain and its surroundings have made the area a popular landmark in the province of Córdoba.

== Spiritual Practices ==
Since the late 20th century, Cerro Uritorco has become a focal point for spiritual tourism and New Age practices, being perceived by many as a site of heightened energetic potential. The peak draws visitors engaged in meditation, yoga, and rituals, particularly at specially constructed sites such as the “Pyramid of Uritorco,” designed to channel and amplify the mountain’s reputed energy through geometric alignment.

The local area also serves as a hub for a variety of New Age and holistic practices. These include crystal singing bowls tuned to resonance frequencies, chakra balancing workshops, Reiki sessions, psych‑k (a technique purported to shift limiting beliefs), astrological readings, and mandala creation. Discussions of “energy recharge,” karmic acceleration, and the transformative potential of the vicinity have been voiced by visitors and locals alike.

Scholarly research situates Cerro Uritorco within broader cultural and imaginative frameworks, observing how it has been seen as a sacred space.
