= UFO sightings in Argentina =

List of alleged UFO sightings in the nation of Argentina

This is an incomplete list of alleged sightings of unidentified flying objects or UFOs in Argentina.

== May 1962 ==
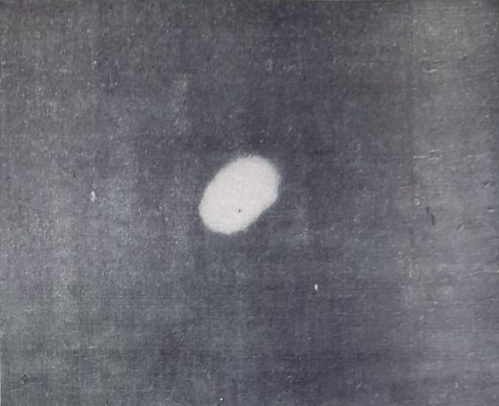
UFO photographed by Miguel Tohmé in Bahía Blanca on 21 May 1962.

- On 11 and 18 May 1962, UFOs were seen at the Espora Air Base.
- On 12 May 1962, truck drivers Valentino Tomassini, Gauro Tomassini, and Humberto Zenobi were travelling on Route 35 from Bahía Blanca to Jacinto Arauz. At 4:10 a.m. they saw an object on the ground in a field next to the road at a distance of 100 metres. The object looked like a railroad car and was illuminated. As their truck came close to it, the object rose up and crossed the road at a height of four metres; its lights went out and a reddish flame emanated from the lower section. Ultimately, the object divided into two parts, which flew off in different directions.
- On 21 May 1962, Miguel Tohmé, photographer from La Nueva Provincia, took two photos of a UFO "the size of a soccer ball" in Bahía Blanca. One of the images appeared on the front page of the newspaper the next day.
- Between 21 and 23 May 1962, UFOs were seen at the Port Belgrano Naval Base.

== 16 July 1965 ==
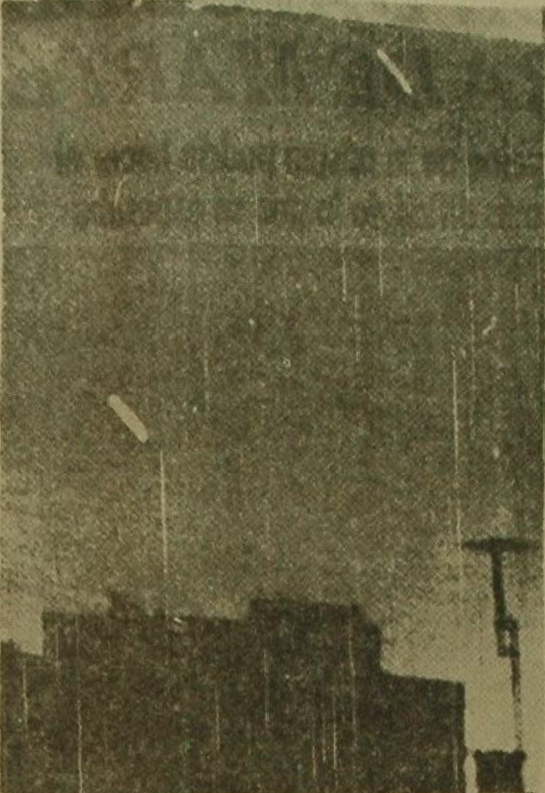
Two white lights in the sky photographed by United Press on 16 July 1965.

- In Buenos Aires, two bright discs remained stationary for 10 minutes and then flew away at high speed. Due to the large number of reports that were being received, the Seventh Air Brigade sent three Gloster Meteor jets from Morón Air Base to investigate, with negative results.

== 1 December 1965 ==
- This sighting took place on 1 December 1965, at 8:40 pm. Scientists at the privately-owned Adhara Observatory in San Miguel, Buenos Aires Province received several calls concerning strange objects visible on the moon. The staff of the observatory photographed the moon in fixed intervals; after processing, some photos revealed shadow-like spots flying in front of the moon. Some experts think that the UFOs in the photos are probably a fault in the processing of the film.

== 27 October 1973 ==
- On October 30, truck driver Dionisio Llanca was admitted to the Municipal Hospital of Bahía Blanca. He claimed that on the night of October 27, he had left his uncle's home in Bahia Blanca to travel to Río Gallegos when he stopped to change a tire and became paralyzed by an intense light. According to Llanca, he saw an object in the sky and beings he described as two men and a woman who subjected him to some form of medical testing. Llanca says he briefly awoke hours later approximately 9 kilometers away. The case was investigated by UFO researcher Fabio Zerpa and published in his book El reino subterráneo.

== 9 January 1986 ==
- There was an alleged UFO landing on Mount Pajarillo, near the city of Capilla del Monte. It was witnessed by an 11-year-old local child named Gabriel Gómez. The day after the sighting, near Cerro Uritorco, a circular footprint appeared on the ground, known as “Huella del Pajarillo”. It is believed that the area was burned in a circular shape due to a UFO landing.

== 25 December 1988 ==
- A silver UFO flew over Villa Urquiza in the city of Buenos Aires. It is considered the most spectacular UFO incident of Argentina, with more than 7,500 witnesses. The local airport reported an object flying to the west towards General Paz Avenue.

== 5 September 2023 ==
- In the Espora Air Base, near Bahía Blanca, four UFOs flew over the base on the night of 5 September 2023 and were seen by military personnel, who responded and engaged with gunfire. The objects were black and triangular in shape. One object fired a laser that injured two or three soldiers. The Base denied any incident and said that the videos and audio that circulated that night were edited to create fake news.

== See also ==
- List of reported UFO sightings
