= Córdoba Cabildo =

Colonial town hall of Córdoba, Argentina

Cabildo of Córdoba
- Cabildo de Córdoba
- Exterior view
- Interactive map of the Cabildo of Córdoba area
- Former names: Cabildo de Justicia y Regimiento de Córdoba

General information
- Type: Museum
- Architectural style: Spanish colonial
- Location: Independencia 34, Córdoba, Argentina
- Coordinates: 31°24′59″S 64°11′3″W
- Construction started: 1588
- Completed: 1610 (original building); 1786; 240 years ago (current building)
- Renovated: 1649, 1890s
- Owner: List: Spanish Government (1610–1822); Córdoba Province (1822–1989); Municipality of Córdoba (1989–present)

National Historic Monument of Argentina
- Designated: 1941

The Córdoba Cabildo is a historic building in Córdoba, Argentina that served as a city's cabildo (colonial town hall). Located opposite Plaza San Martín, it was known from the city's founding as the "Cabildo de Justicia y Regimiento de Córdoba" (Council of Justice and Regiment of Córdoba). It was the institution that managed all civic affairs during the colonial era, including laws, product prices, education, health, public safety, and the public jail during the Viceroyalty of the Río de la Plata. Its original purpuse as cabildo ended in 1824 during the government of Juan Bautista Bustos.

After its closure as a cabildo, the building served for different purposes such as the seat of the provincial government, municipal headquarters (from 1857), and Córdoba Provincial Police headquarters until 1989. Since then, it has been returned to the municipality to be transformed into a museum and cultural center.

It was designated National Historic Monument of Argentina in 1941.

== History ==
The local government in Córdoba met in its members' private homes in the first years after the settlement's 1573 establishment. The first structure designated for the purpose was begun in 1588, and was a modest adobe and thatched roof structure typical of the colonial era in Spanish America. A framed wood structure designed by Alonso de Encinas replaced the precarious, initial cabildo in 1610.

Encinas' cabildo, which included only the Alcalde's office, living quarters and a small jail, was ordered replaced by a larger building in 1749 by the Alcade (Mayor), José Moyano Oscariz. The Governor of Córdoba appointed in 1783, the Marquess of Sobremonte, Rafael Núñez, prioritized the much delayed completion of the new Cabildo. He commissioned Juan Manuel López for the new project, which would feature a significantly larger office space, grand steps, a chapel, a patio, an archway of fifteen columns along the façade, and a covered arcade along the archway for the inclusion of storefronts. The greatly accelerated works were concluded in 1786, and would include the opening of the Santa Catalina Promenade between the cabildo and the recently built Córdoba Cathedral.

The Cabildo with a tower and clock. This was later demolished to keep its original design

Marble cladding and a bell tower (designed by architect Mariano Well) were added in 1882, but due to structural damage the tower had to be removed in 1912. That coincided with other numerous historic structures in Argentina being restored to their approximate, original design by having such additions demolished. The Córdoba Cabildo, like the Cathedral, was declared a National Historic Monument in 1941.

The city government was relocated to a Renaissance Revivalist structure late in the 19th century, and to a Modernist building (its current home) in the 1960s. A section of the historic cabildo remained in use by the Provincial Police Department of Information (DDI), however, and during the last dictatorship, this wing was used as one of over 300 detention centers operated by the regime during the Dirty War of the late 1970s.

After serving as headquarters of Córdoba Provincial Police, in 1989 the provincial government returned the Cabildo to the municipality of Córdoba to be transformed into a cultural center.

== Gallery ==
Arcs

Corridors

Interior

Night view

Fountain

== Bibliography ==
- Vigil, Carlos. Los Monumentos y lugares históricos de la Argentina. Buenos Aires: Editorial Atlántida, 1968.
