= Cruz del Eje =

- City
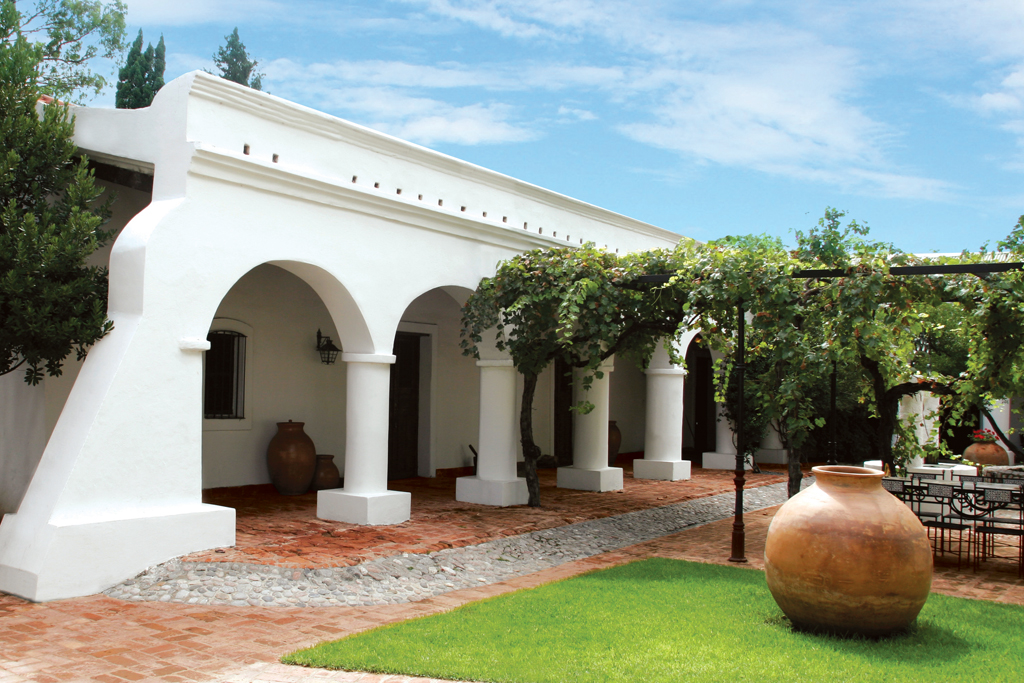
- Estancia Siguimán

- Location of Cruz del Eje in Argentina
- Coordinates: 30°44′S 64°48′W
- Country: Argentina
- Province: Córdoba
- Department: Cruz del Eje

Government
  - Intendant: Renato Raschetti (UCR)
- Elevation: 449 m (1,473 ft)

Population (2010 census)
  - Total: 30,680
- Time zone: UTC−3 (ART)
- CPA base: X5280
- Dialing code: +54 3549
- Website: Official website

Cruz del Eje is a city in the province of Córdoba, Argentina. It had about 30,000 inhabitants at the 2010 census [INDEC]. It is the head town of the department of the same name, which has a population of about 52,000.

The area of the city was originally inhabited by Comechingón aboriginals, which were thoroughly displaced or exterminated by the Spanish conquistadores by the end of the 17th century. The first official owner of the lands was Francisco de Baigorri, as recorded on September 22, 1735, which is taken as the foundation date of the city.

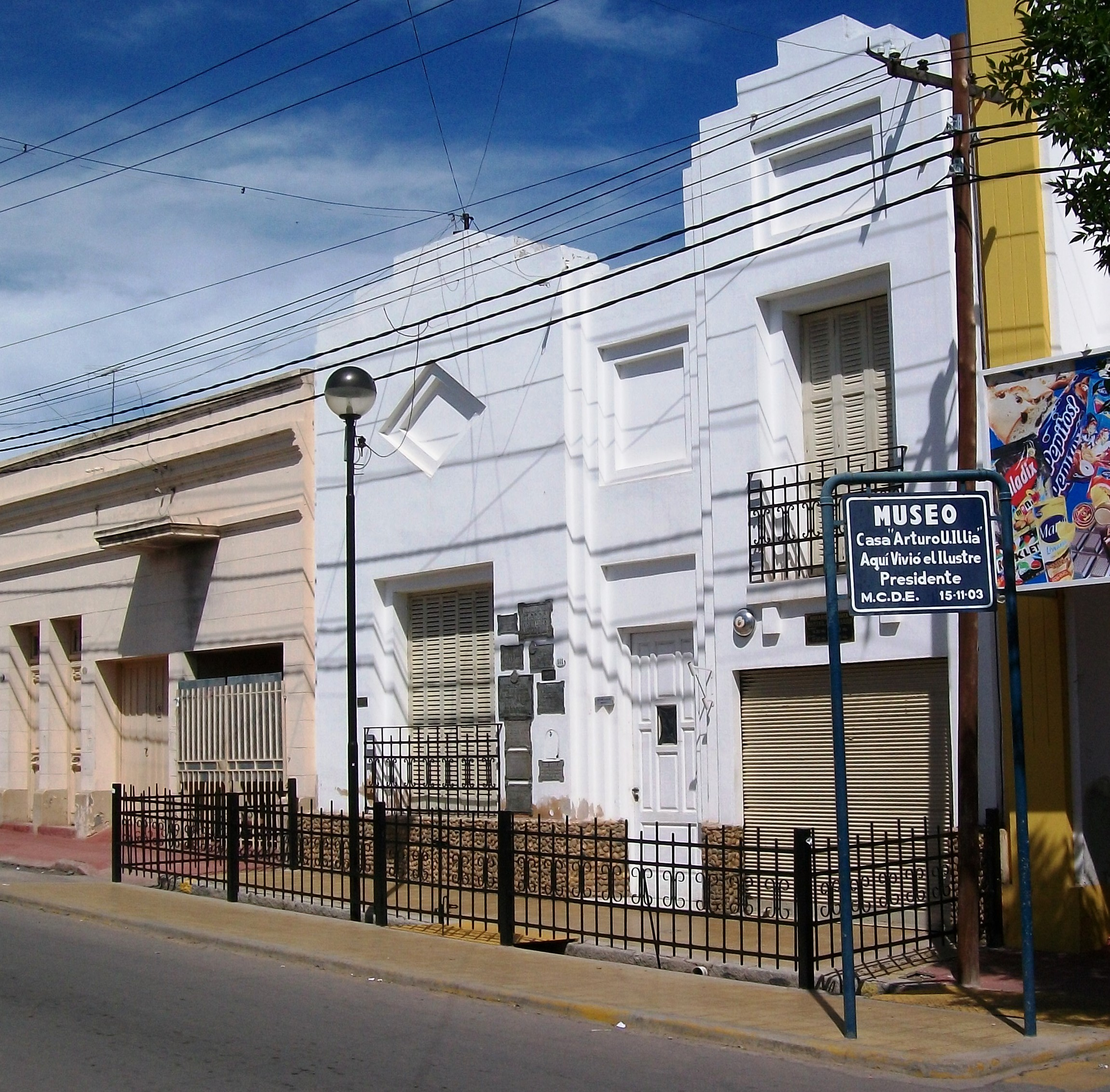
The Arturo Illia Museum

The settlement was linked by a road to the provincial capital, Córdoba, in 1878, and it was declared a municipality on May 8, 1890; at the time it had about 4,000 inhabitants. On the latter year the train station was also opened. Cruz del Eje's position as a railroad node would lead to a rapid growth in importance; the railway workshops were dismantled in the 1970s. The Cruz del Eje Reservoir, initiated by Governor Amadeo Sabattini, was completed in 1943. The city grew subsequently as a tourist destination.

President Arturo Illia maintained a medical practice in Cruz del Eje from 1928 until his election as President of Argentina in 1963. President Illia's Cruz del Eje home was made a museum in 2003.

Mario Rubén González Pierotti, Jairo, was born in Cruz del Eje, on June 16, 1949. Jairo is an Argentine singer-songwriter and composer from Cruz del Eje, Córdoba. Throughout his career, he has performed more than 500 songs in Spanish, French and Italian.

Among its most widespread songs they are: «Tu alma golondrina», «Por si tú quieres saber», «Tristezas», «De pronto sucedió», «El valle y el volcán», «Si vuelves será cansancio», «Amigos míos me enamoré», «Hoy dejó la ciudad», «Nos verán llegar», «Revólver» and «Me encanta esta hora del día».
