= Capilla del Monte =

- City
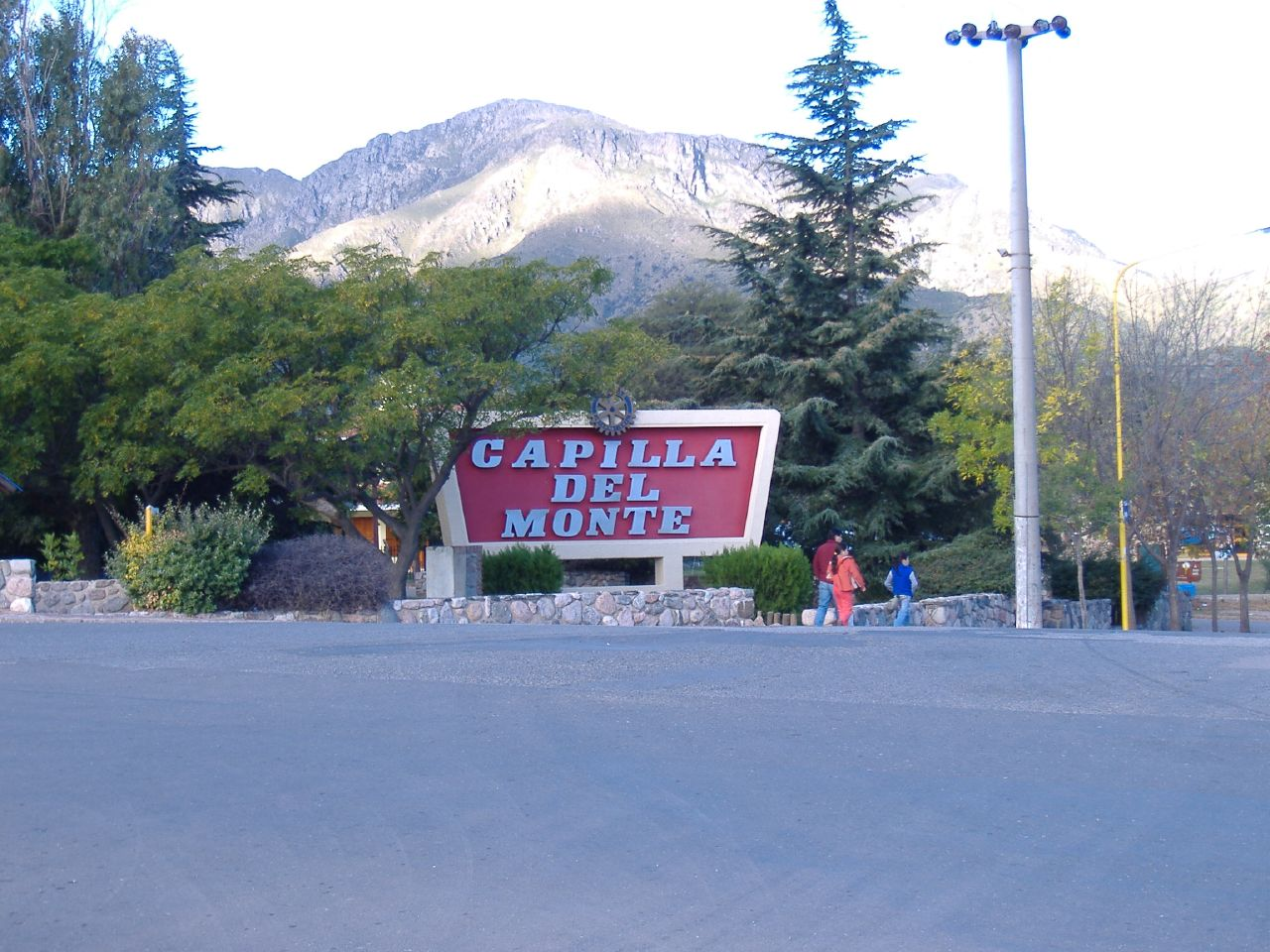
- Capilla del Monte
- Nickname: Ciudad de los Ovnis ("UFO City")
- Location of Capilla del Monte in Argentina
- Coordinates: 30°51′S 64°31′W
- Country: Argentina
- Province: Córdoba
- Department: Punilla
- Founded: October 30, 1585

Government
  - Intendant: Fabricio Díaz (PJ)
- Elevation: 979 m (3,212 ft)

Population (2010 census)
  - Total: 11,281
- Time zone: UTC−3 (ART)
- CPA base: X5184
- Dialing code: +54 3548

Capilla del Monte is a small city in the northeastern part of the province of Córdoba, Argentina, located by the Sierras Chicas mountain chain, in the northern end of the Punilla Valley. It has about 11,281 inhabitants as per the 2010 census [INDEC].

Tourism is the main source of income in Capilla del Monte. The most popular tourist attraction in the area is the Cerro Uritorco, a small mountain only 3 km away from the city, famed around Argentina as a center of alleged paranormal phenomena and UFO sightings. There are many other locations in Capilla del Monte that attract tourists from all over the country.

The city also features the tall El Cajón Dam and its large reservoir.

Capilla del Monte was founded on October 30, 1585. Its name means "Chapel on the Hill" in Spanish.

The area has been used as a special stage for Rally Argentina.

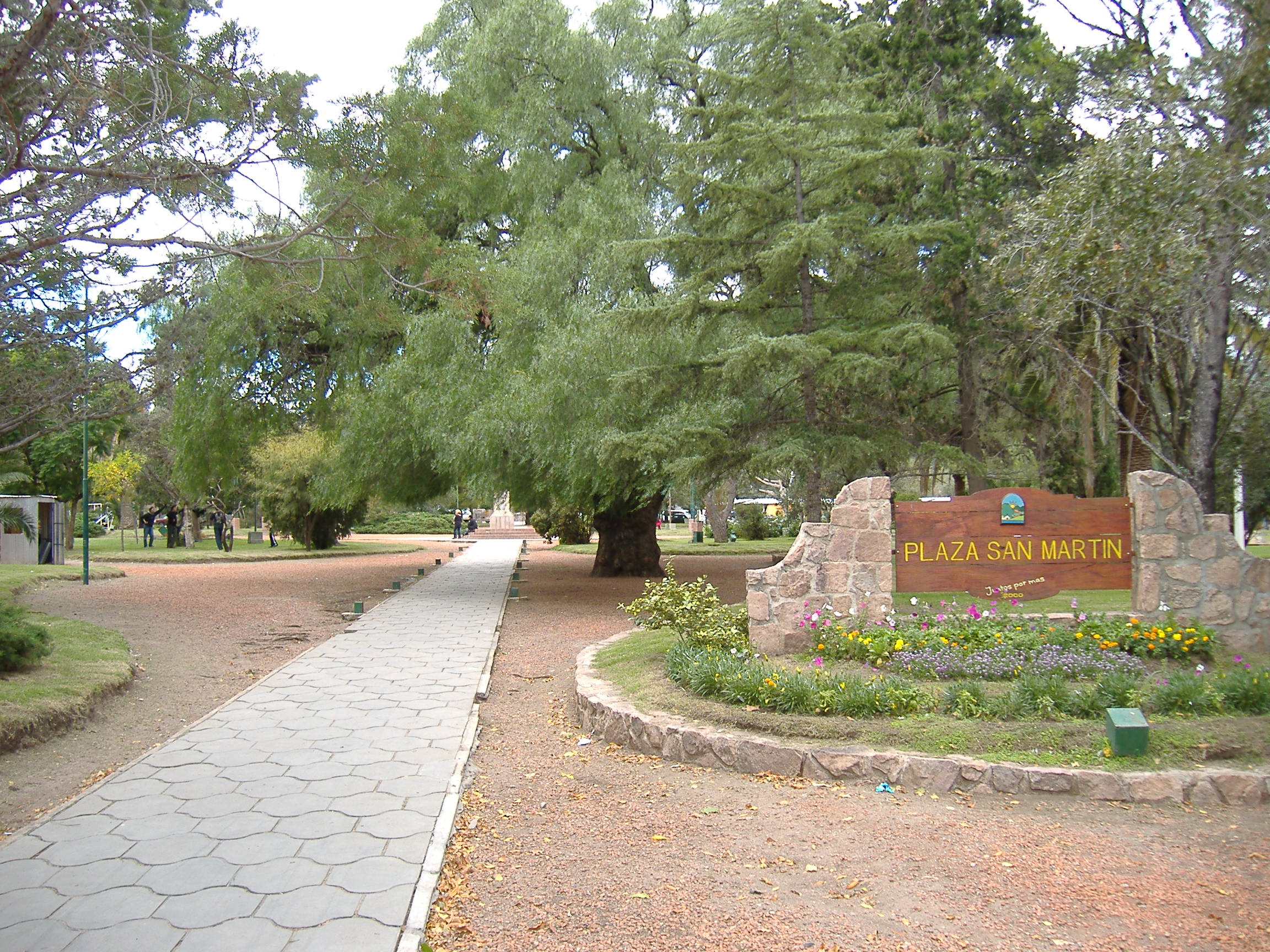

== Origin ==
=== 1585 – 1986 ===
The origins of Capilla del Monte can be traced back to the late 16th century, when Lucía González Jaimes, the daughter of the Spanish conqueror Bartolomé Jaimes, inherited lands in this area. This granting of land took place on October 30, 1585, which is considered to be the founding date of the city. Between 1695 and 1719, Captain Antonio de Ceballos built the first chapel that was founded in the area and that eventually gave the city its name, which means “Chapel on the Hill” in Spanish. According to the official records, the chapel was rebuilt in 1908 under the Presbyterian priest Arturo Gómez Morón and rechristened Church of San Antonio de Padua. The new church is located just a few meters away from the current city center. It is situated on a hill about half a kilometer away from the original train station of the Tren de las Sierras. However, some locals claim that the chapel that gives the city its name is a different one, located in another area that hasn't yet been urbanized.

In 1878, Adolf Döring, a German Argentine chemist, zoologist and geologist, arrived in Capilla del Monte and settled there. He purchased a ranch and he was responsible for urbanizing the area surrounding it until his death in 1925. He built a sewage system and designed the outline of the current city center, which is why he is considered to be the founder of Capilla del Monte as we know it today. Many of the mansions which are characteristic of the city were built during this period as well.

Throughout the first half of the 20th century, Capilla del Monte saw its growth in size and popularity as a consequence of the arrival of new inhabitants. New businesses opened and the population further increased. The Los Alazanes Dam was built in the 1940s because a broader supply was needed to provide the new inhabitants with water.

The 1970s saw a recession in tourism, mostly because of the National Reorganization Process of 1976-1983, a dictatorship that struck Argentina and prevented the population from moving freely across the nation. Until the 1970s, the city's population was located mostly around the train station. That building now houses the Center of Tourist Information.

=== 1986 – present ===
On January 9, 1986, the famous Huella del Pajarillo incident took place. That night, a dark, circular footprint of 100 meters in diameter appeared on Mount Pajarillo, resembling a UFO landing. Although this event is believed to have been staged, it marked a fundamental change in the idiosyncrasy of Capilla del Monte. After the news of the event spread, the city began to attract all sorts of people interested in UFOs, magic, mysticism, and other esoteric phenomena. Ever since then, the city dwellers have adapted their businesses to suit the interests of this new demographic group. As a result, most shops in the city center area sell items that reflect this new identity, such as UFO and alien-themed souvenirs, energy stones, dreamcatchers, and other such paraphernalia. In 2012, the Alien Festival was created in the city, and it has been celebrated almost every February since then. The participants in this festival embrace and promote this new identity by dressing up as extra-terrestrials or fictional characters from popular science fiction sagas such as Star Wars and Star Trek.

== Tourist attractions ==
=== Cerro Uritorco ===
Cerro Uritorco is the highest mountain in the Sierras Chicas mountain range, with an elevation of 1900 meters above sea level. Even though the government of Capilla del Monte has tried to expropriate Cerro Uritorco, it continues to have a private administration, and both tourists and locals have to pay an entry fee to access the premises. The summit can be reached in about 3 hours. On the way up, there is a wide range of vegetation, waterfalls, ponds, and water springs. At the summit is a view of the town, the El Cajón Dam, and the huge salt pans on the north of the province of Córdoba, which are known as Salinas Grandes. Several cases of UFO sightings have been reported in the areas surrounding Cerro Uritorco, which is why the mountain is believed to be a center of extraterrestrial activity. It is also believed that the mountain is home to an underground city named Erks, where the chosen ones will be able to take refuge once the apocalypse arrives. Several books have been written on the matter. All these occurrences have contributed to Cerro Uritorco being associated with mysticism and strange happenings.

=== El Castillo del Cómic ===
El Castillo del Cómic is a museum that displays more than 15,000 action figures and over 3,000 comic books. The museum is located in a mansion known as Hostería Argentina, which was built in 1905. Visitors can take a tour of the mansion, learn about the history of comic books, and participate in workshops and exhibitions that are frequently hosted in El Castillo. There is also a bar and restaurant.

=== Los Alazanes Dam ===
Los Alazanes Dam was built on a mountainous area between Cerro Overo and Cerro Las Gemelas. Its construction started in 1939 and finished in 1941. It was built due to an increase in population, which demanded more water. Its main function was at first to provide the city with water, especially during the summer, when the population would rise the most because of the arrival of tourists. Nowadays, apart from being the main source of water for citizens, the dam is also used as a spot for sightseeing and hiking because of its unusual location.

=== El Cajón Dam ===
The construction of El Cajón Dam began in the 1970s. Because of a lack of funds due to the 1970s recession, its construction had to be postponed until the dam was finally finished and inaugurated in 1993. It was built mainly as a tourist attraction. The main activities people can engage in are swimming, fishing, and sailing. The dam also provides water to the water treatment plant, which purifies the water and makes it drinkable for citizens.

=== Calle Techada ===
The Calle Techada (“roofed street” in English) is located in the heart of the city center, more precisely on Avenida Diagonal Buenos Aires. The roof was set up in 1964 to host the international photographic exhibition “Foto Cita 64”. Although the roof was not meant to stay there, it was used to hold several other photographic exhibitions in the 1960s and it was never disassembled. It carried on to become one of the most popular landmarks in the city. At present, it is one of the preferred spots for tourists, since most businesses and restaurants are located under it. It is also the main location where the Alien Festival and other festivities take place.

=== El Zapato ===
El Zapato is a natural rock formation that resembles the shape of a shoe. Located in the El Zapato neighborhood, it is popular not only because of its unusual shape but because it also offers a view of the city and the El Cajón Dam.

== Geography ==
=== Location ===
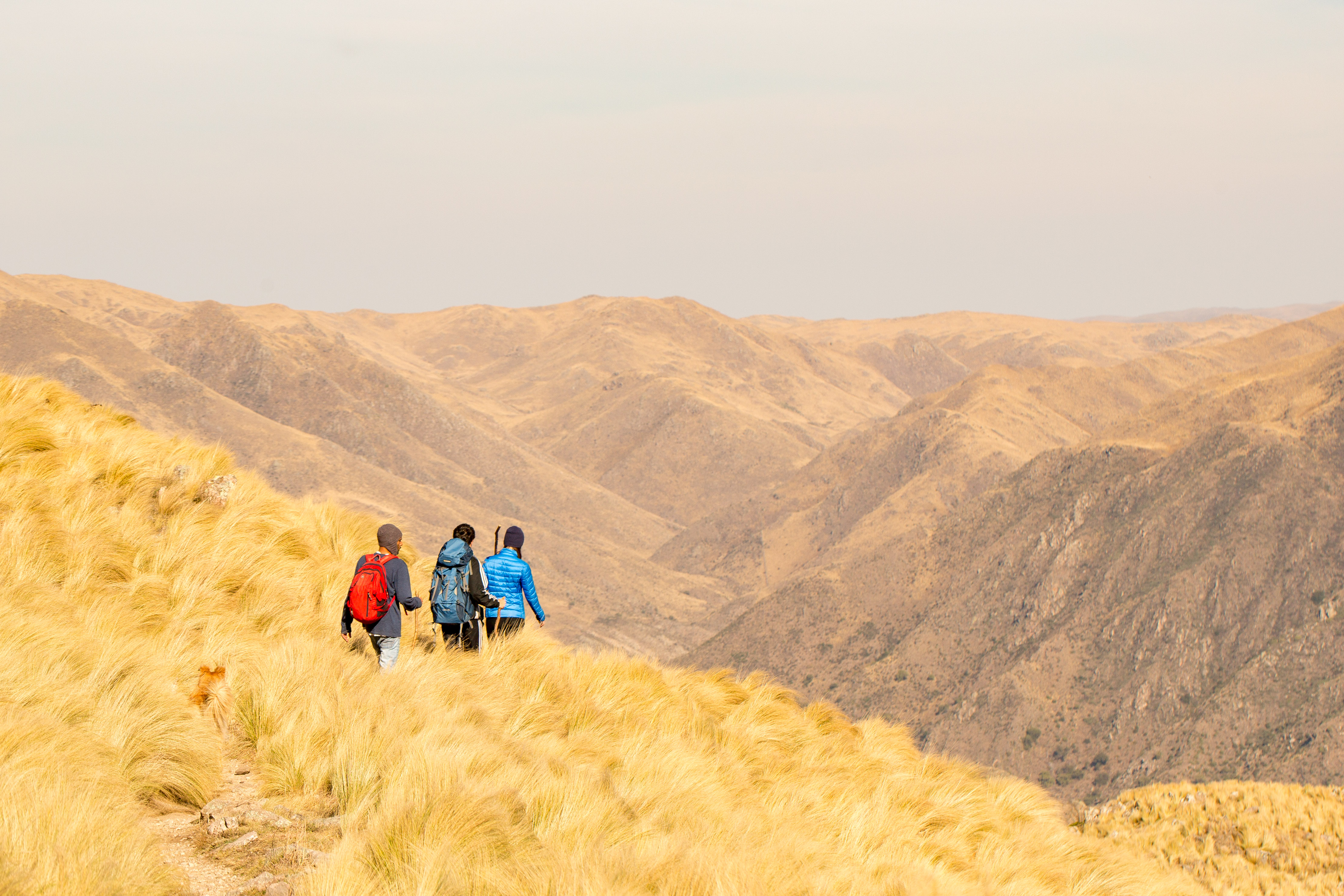
Mountains by Capilla del Monte

The city extends along the western foothills of the mountains Cerro Uritorco and Cerro Las Gemelas to the lake El Cajón, which forms from the river Río Dolores. It centers around the highway Ruta Nacional 38. Urban development has grown from the late 1980s, encouraged by the arrival of families from other cities, especially those from Buenos Aires, Rosario, and Córdoba. Development was dominated by residential construction. The urban area has grown to include areas that still maintain predominantly natural characteristics, such as the rock formation El Zapato, the Los Paredones hills, and the banks of the Calabalumba River.

=== Climate ===
Capilla del Monte has a subtropical highland climate, with an average annual precipitation of 641 millimetres (25.2 in). Summers are pleasant and winters are chilly and drier. Snowfalls are uncommon. This climate is described by the Köppen climate classification as Cwb.

Climate data for Capilla del Monte
| Month | Jan | Feb | Mar | Apr | May | Jun | Jul | Aug | Sep | Oct | Nov | Dec | Year |
|---|---|---|---|---|---|---|---|---|---|---|---|---|---|
| Mean daily maximum °C (°F) | 27.8 (82.0) | 26.5 (79.7) | 23.2 (73.8) | 21.0 (69.8) | 18.2 (64.8) | 15.5 (59.9) | 15.6 (60.1) | 17.8 (64.0) | 20.4 (68.7) | 22.4 (72.3) | 24.8 (76.6) | 27.6 (81.7) | 21.7 (71.1) |
| Daily mean °C (°F) | 20.6 (69.1) | 19.6 (67.3) | 16.6 (61.9) | 14.3 (57.7) | 11.6 (52.9) | 9.0 (48.2) | 8.5 (47.3) | 9.9 (49.8) | 12.7 (54.9) | 15.3 (59.5) | 17.4 (63.3) | 20.4 (68.7) | 14.7 (58.4) |
| Mean daily minimum °C (°F) | 13.5 (56.3) | 12.7 (54.9) | 10.1 (50.2) | 7.7 (45.9) | 5.0 (41.0) | 2.6 (36.7) | 1.5 (34.7) | 2.1 (35.8) | 5.1 (41.2) | 8.2 (46.8) | 10.0 (50.0) | 13.2 (55.8) | 7.6 (45.8) |
| Average precipitation mm (inches) | 101 (4.0) | 95 (3.7) | 83 (3.3) | 41 (1.6) | 30 (1.2) | 9 (0.4) | 11 (0.4) | 8 (0.3) | 21 (0.8) | 64 (2.5) | 84 (3.3) | 94 (3.7) | 641 (25.2) |
Source: Climate Data
