= La Vanguardia (Argentina) =

- Type: irregularly-published newspaper
- Format: compact
- Publisher: Américo Schvartzman
- Founded: April 7, 1894
- Political alignment: Social democracy Democratic socialism
- Headquarters: Buenos Aires
- Circulation: 280,000 (1940s)
- Website: www.lavanguardiadigital.com.ar

La Vanguardia is an Argentine newspaper, founded by Socialist Party leader Juan B. Justo in 1894.

== History ==
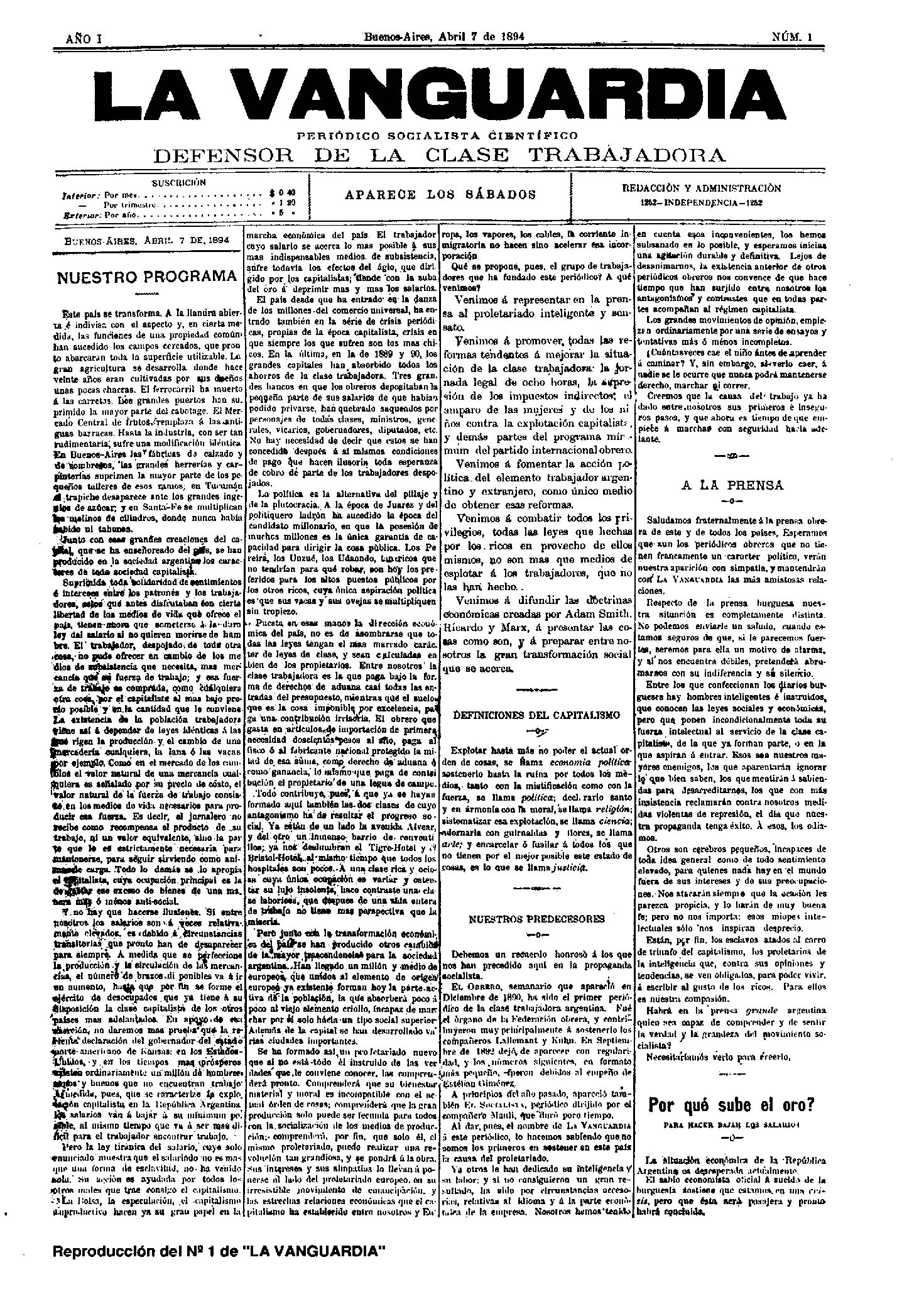
First issue of La Vanguardia

=== Early history ===
La Vanguardia was founded by Juan B. Justo, Esteban Jiménez, Augusto Kühn, Isidro Salomó, and Juan Fernández. Its first issue was published on April 7, 1894, and Jiménez served as its first typographer. The paper's first editorial was titled "This country is transforming itself" and analyzed the prevailing economic and social policy from a Marxist perspective.

The newspaper, printed initially in a San Telmo neighborhood boarding house, became a gathering point for socialists active in Argentina in the late nineteenth century. These meetings would result in the establishment of the Socialist Party in 1896, and La Vanguardia became the party's official journal.

Co-operative movement leader Nicolás Repetto succeeded Justo as its editor-in-chief in 1901, and in 1905, was first sold openly on street corners. The paper's Mexico Street offices in the Constitución ward were destroyed by arson during the Centennial celebrations of 1910, however.

=== Prominence ===
Enrique del Valle Iberlucea, a Spanish Argentine lawyer, became its director in 1916. He had founded Revista Socialista Internacional with Alicia Moreau in 1908; Moreau married the party's leader, Juan B. Justo, in 1914. Disaffected member of the party, including Augusto Kühn and Rodolfo Ghioldi, established a rival publication, Adelante, in 1916, though without success.

The Socialist Party grew significantly in Buenos Aires and Mar del Plata following the 1912 enactment of the Sáenz Peña Law guaranteeing a secret ballot and universal (male) suffrage. The party split, however, during their 1927 convention, and Senator Justo died in January 1928. Two socialist tickets thus competed in the 1928 elections, and La Vanguardia, edited since 1925 by Américo Ghioldi (Rodolfo's brother), would endorse the Authentic Socialist Party, led by Congressman Mario Bravo; neither ticket made gains, however.

The prominence the party had earned, however, allowed them to inaugurate a landmark Rivadavia Avenue headquarters in 1927 (the Casa de Pueblo), from which La Vanguardia would also be published. Ghioldi and Bravo led the publication during Argentina's "Infamous Decade," when the right-wing Concordance regime that took power in fraudulent elections held in 1931 perpetuated itself by the same tactics. Censorship made La Vanguardia's publication more intermittent in the ensuing years. It was suspended four times in 1942, and following a coup d'état in 1943, an edict mandating that all newspaper articles carry their writers' full names in their bylines forced it to shut down again.

=== Persecution ===
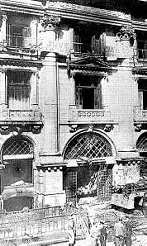
The Socialist Party headquarters (Casa del Pueblo) following an attack by Peronists in 1953

The election of populist leader Juan Perón in 1946 had been opposed by most Socialists. Its readership, despite (and arguably because) of ongoing intimidation, reached a historic high of 280,000 copies daily during the mid-1940s. Using a noise ordinance as a pretext, its presses were shut down by a municipal order on August 27, 1947. Led by Luis Pan, its editors opened a clandestine press in Ranelagh, a southern suburb of Buenos Aires, and though this facility was later discovered by police, La Vanguardia continued to appear as a weekly newspaper.

Much of the Socialist Party's leadership, as well as its journal's staff, would be imprisoned during Perón's successful 1951 re-election campaign, and only the willingness of El Sol editor-in-chief Emilio Frugoni to include La Vanguardia as a last-page supplement kept the periodical in publication. The following year, however, its remaining staff created an international edition of La Vanguardia printed in Montevideo, Uruguay, on Bible paper to facilitate its distribution abroad.

A Peronist riot on April 15, 1953, triggered by bombs detonated at the Plaza de Mayo during a mass gathering resulted in the destruction of the Casa del Pueblo. The building survived initially. Its interiors, including a 70,000-volume library and the editorial bureau of La Vanguardia, were destroyed, however. The paper's Montevideo edition responded by applauding the Bombing of Plaza de Mayo (in which over 300 died) as a "historic day against the tyranny of an arrogant man."

=== Division and reunification ===
President Perón was overthrown in 1955, and La Vanguardia resumed its regular edition with a circulation of 200,000. The Socialist Party, however, suffered a new schism ahead of the 1958 elections. The two factions (Palacios and Alicia Moreau de Justo's Argentine Socialist Party, and Ghioldi and Repetto's more anti-Peronist Democratic Socialist Party) would each publish separate editions of La Vanguardia, with Juan Antonio Solari and Alicia Moreau de Justo as editors of each.

The absorption of the Argentine Socialist Party into the Popular Socialist Party (PSP) in 1972 made the leader of the PSP, Guillermo Estévez Boero, director of La Vanguardia Popular. The ongoing division of both the party and the journal precluded any refurbishment of the derelict Casa del Pueblo, and in 1974, the once-grand neo-classical building was demolished.

The reunification of the Socialist Party in 2002 restored the ailing La Vanguardia as the party's sole official publication. The journal would be published irregularly, however, with an average of one issue every four months. Its director, Américo Schvartzman, founded and edited El Miércoles, a socialist weekly in Concepción del Uruguay, Entre Ríos, from 2000 to 2007.
