= Argentine Socialist Party (1958) =

Left-wing political party in Argentina

Argentine Socialist Party Partido Socialista Argentino
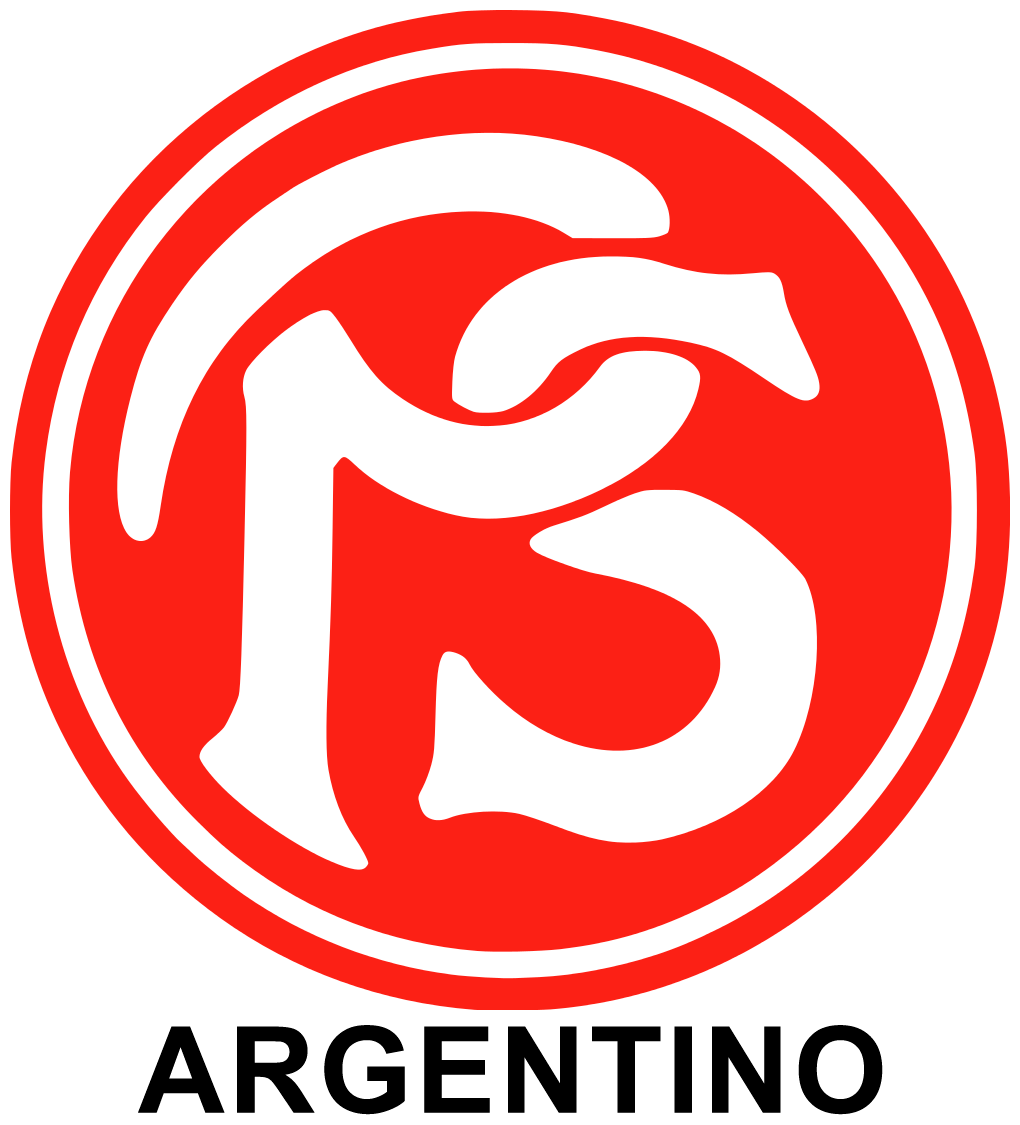
- Abbreviation: PSA
- Leader: Alfredo Palacios; Alicia Moreau de Justo
- Founded: 1958
- Dissolved: 1972
- Split from: Socialist Party
- Succeeded by: People's Socialist Party
- Headquarters: Buenos Aires, Argentina
- Youth wing: Socialist Youth of Argentina
- Ideology: Democratic socialism Reformism; Progressivism
- Political position: Left-wing
- International affiliation: Socialist International

The Argentine Socialist Party was a socialist political party in Argentina formed after the third division of the Socialist Party.

== History ==
=== Origin ===
When democracy was restored (though peronism became illegal) in 1958, a Socialist Party congress was held in Rosario, in which a faction led by the Senator Alfredo Palacios and Alicia Moreau de Justo denounced that some party leaders were not truly socialists, accusing them of supporting a new version of Manchester Liberalism. After this congress, there was a disrupt in the traditional party: on the one hand, Nicolás Repetto and Américo Ghioldi founded the Democratic Socialist Party, on the other hand, the previously mentioned Palacios and Moreau founded the Argentine Socialist Party. Though both proclaimed themselves as the Socialist Party, the government forced them to use different denominations, ending up in Argentine and Democratic respectively.

=== 1958–1965 ===
While the Democratic Socialist Party held both anti-Peronist and anti-communist views, the Argentine one embraced Peronism as a proletarian movement, becoming an alternative during the years the Peronist party was prohibited. This benefited the PSA, winning six seats for the Chamber of Deputies in the 1963 election. The party could ensure stability during these years, something that would change after the death of its leader, Alfredo Palacios, in 1965.

=== 1965–1972 ===
Although the PSA suffered some minor splits after its foundation, these became common after the death of Palacios and the illegalization of political parties after the 1966–1973 coup. Numerous far-left radicals including Maoists, Guevarists and Fidelists could not stand the centre-left views of the party, so they started joining other parties, such as the Socialist Vanguard Party, the Communist Vanguard Party, the Communist Party and the Worker's Socialist Party.

In 1970, Jorge Selser led the PSA to participate, along the Justicialist Party, the Radical Civic Union, the Christian Democratic Party and the Bloquist Party, in La Hora del Pueblo (in English, The People's Hour), a document written to demand the dictatorship the restoration of democracy. Because of this, the de facto president, Alejandro Lanusse, announced the restoration of democracy through the 1972 Gran Acuerdo Nacional (in English, Great National Accord) and his Interior Minister, Arturo Mor Roig, organized elections for 1973. Nevertheless, the new legislation would dissolve the PSA, because it did not allow any party to call itself Argentine. Although Selser wanted to form a new socialist party independently using other name, they did not have enough people to participate in the elections. Knowing this, Guillermo Estévez Boero, the leader of a socialist organization from the interior of the country, convinced him to merge the parties under a Leninist ideology, which resulted in the People's Socialist Party.
