= Victoria Gucovsky =

Argentine writer and socialist activist (1890–1969)

- Born: 22 February 1890; Genoa, Kingdom of Italy
- Died: 18 October 1969 (aged 79); Buenos Aires, Argentina
- Education: Instituto de Profesorado Secundario
- Spouses: Antonio de Tomaso (m. 1917; div. 1921): Boris Fikh
- Mother: Fenia Chertkoff
- Relatives: Nicolás Repetto (step-father); Juan B. Justo (uncle)

Victoria Gucovsky (22 February 1890 – 18 October 1969) was an Argentine teacher, writer and socialist activist. Gucovsky founded the Adult Literacy League (Spanish: Liga Pro Alfabetización de Adultos), and was a member of the Socialist Women's Center.

== Early life and education ==
Gucovsky was born on 22 February 1890 in Genoa to socialist Odesan-Jewish parents. Her father, Gabriel Gukovsky (died 1894), was a poet, engineer and socialist, and her mother, Fenia Chertkoff, was an educator and later feminist activist, translator and sculptor. Following her father's death in 1894, Gucovsky and her mother returned to Odessa. The same year Gucovsky and her mother initially settled in Switzerland before emigrating to Argentina in 1895.

In Argentina, Gucovsky settled in Colonia Santa Clara in Entre Ríos Province, an agricultural settlement founded by the Jewish Colonisation Association. Gucovsky and mother later settled in Buenos Aires, where her mother married the physician and Socialist Party of Argentina politician Nicolás Repetto. Educated at the Liceo Nacional de Señoritas, Gucovsky later studied to be a biology teacher at the Instituto de Profesorado Secundario.

== Career ==
For 32 (Note: Also cited as 30.) years, Gucovsky taught biology at the Liceo Nacional de Señoritas and other secondary school in Buenos Aires. A regular contributor to the literary supplement for La Nación, between 1918 and 1923 Gucovsky edited the Vida Femenina supplement for La Vanguardia. Gucovsky also contributed articles on music and art for the Socialist Yearbook (Spanish: Anuario Socialista). A member of the Socialist Women's Center, Gucovsky founded the Adult Literacy League (Spanish: Liga Pro Alfabetización de Adultos).

Between 1915 and 1919, (Note: Also cited as 1914 to 1919.) Gucovsky contracted either pleurisy or tuberculosis and settled in Tío Pujio, Córdoba Province with her mother. During this period developed her future works Tierra Adentro (1921) and El Llanto de la Higuera (1930).

== Personal life ==
In 1917, Gucovsky married the politician Antonio de Tomaso but later divorced in 1921. Gucovsky later married Boris Fikh, and lived in the Parque Chacabuco neighbourhood of Buenos Aires.

Through her aunts Mariana Chertkoff de Justo and Adela Chertkoff de Dickman, Gucovsky was the niece of Juan B. Justo, a physician, journalist, politician and writer, and Adolfo Dickman, a socialist politician and dentist.

On 18 October 1969, Gucovsky died in Buenos Aires aged 79.

== Bibliography ==
- Gucovsky, Victoria (1921). Tierra Adentro (in Spanish). Buenos Aires: Agencia General de Librería y Publicaciones.
- Gucovsky, Victoria (1925). Pasto enterrao (in Spanish). Buenos Aires: Ministry of Agriculture.
- Gucovsky, Victoria (1926). Juanita (in Spanish). Buenos Aires: Sociedad Luz. (Children's play)
- Gucovsky, Victoria (1930). El Llanto de la Higuera (in Spanish). Buenos Aires: Nosotros.
- Gucovsky, Victoria (1931). Una lección interesante. Lo que pasa en China (in Spanish). Buenos Aires: La Vanguardia.
- Gucovsky, Victoria (1933). La mejor diplomacia. La montaña maravillosa. La ofrenda (in Spanish). Buenos Aires: Comisión Continental de las Asociaciones Cristianas Femeninas de la América del Sud.
