= 1912 Argentine legislative election =

- 7 April 1912
- 65 of the 120 seats in the Chamber of Deputies
- Turnout: 70.01%
Party	Vote %	Seats
Conservative Parties	41.58	35
Radical Civic Union	17.77	13
National Union	12.13	6
Civic Union	8.87	6
Socialist Party	5.42	2
Southern League	2.58	1
This lists parties that won seats. See the complete results below.
Results by province

Legislative elections were held in Argentina on 7 April 1912 to elect 65 of the 120 members of the Chamber of Deputies. The first free, democratic elections in the nation's history, the contest had a turnout of 70%.

== Background ==
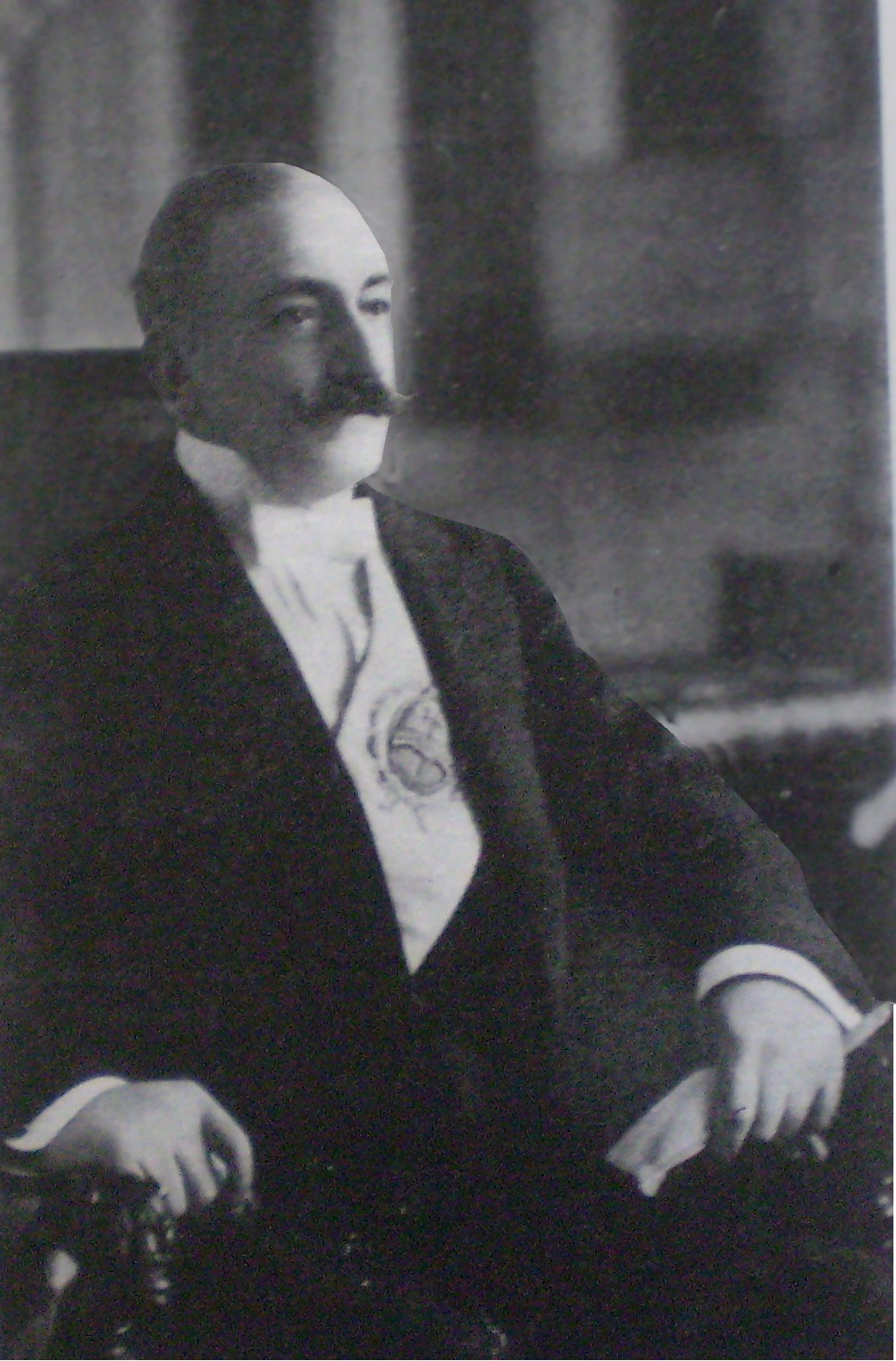
President Roque Sáenz Peña, who made these - Argentina's first free and fair legislative elections - possible despite pressure from his own social class.

The era of dominance by the National Autonomist Party (PAN), made possible by an 1874 agreement between kingmakers Adolfo Alsina and Bartolomé Mitre (as well as by systematic electoral fraud), was also undone by agreement. A visit to Rome in 1909 gave the scion of one of Argentina's most powerful families at the time, Roque Sáenz Peña, the opportunity to meet the governing party's nemesis - the exiled leader of the Radical Civic Union (UCR), Hipólito Yrigoyen. Between one of their numerous discussions, Sáenz Peña was surprised by news that he would carry the PAN's standard for the upcoming "elections" of April, 1910. Sáenz Peña, who had been passed over in favor of his aging (and more conservative) father in 1892, was the counterweight President José Figueroa Alcorta needed against the reactionary wing of his party. Convinced of the need for relectoral reform, Sáenz Peña agreed with Yrigoyen to advance free and fair elections.

President Sáenz Peña kept his word to the eccentric popular leader, who in turn rescinded the UCR's policy of abstentionism. The Sáenz Peña Law, enacted on February 13, mandated universal male suffrage and the secret ballot. Argentina's large immigrant population, most of whom were not yet citizens, were not included in the suffrage; this particularly affected larger cities, such as Buenos Aires and Rosario, where, at the time, more than half the population were born outside Argentina.

Voters in the nation's 14 provinces and Federal District (Buenos Aires) turned out in unprecedented numbers, more than tripling the 199,000 ballots registered in the 1910 elections (the last under the "scripted vote song" scheme that had limited suffrage and produced predictable results since 1862). The UCR, whose boycott, dating from 1892, had left them without representation, was rewarded with 11 Congressmen. They maintained their boycott, however, of numerous gubernatorial elections where a lack of legal safeguards was evident - notably in Buenos Aires Province, and were defeated in the La Rioja gubernatorial elections (among the few not boycotted by the party). The UCR did defeat the rival National Civic Union (UCN) in their first joint electoral test (the latter had not boycotted earlier elections); the UCR had parted ways from the UCN, founded by former President Bartolomé Mitre, in 1890.

The Socialist Party increased their representation from one (the principal Congressional advocate for social legislation and labor laws, Alfredo Palacios) to two: Alfredo Palacios and Juan B. Justo.

The hitherto dominant PAN had suffered a schism in 1908 led by reformist Lisandro de la Torre, who led a significant faction of the ruling party into the Liga del Sur (its successor, Democratic Progressive Party, would become a major third party during the 1920s and '30s). What remained of the PAN became the Conservative Party, which retained its dominance in the Senate, albeit a weakened one; but lost its absolute majority in the Lower House, becoming more reliant on the Unión Nacional (whose strength was in western Argentina).

Elections to the Senate remained the responsibility of each provincial legislature, despite the 1912 reforms, in all districts save for the City of Buenos Aires. The Buenos Aires race, held on March 30, 1913, resulted in an upset, giving Socialist candidate Enrique del Valle Iberlucea a victory over the UCR's Leopoldo Melo by 42,000 votes to 39,000. Ten Senate seats in all (one third of the chamber), were renewed in 1913. The UCR's sole Senator in 1913 (its first) was Ignacio Iturraspe, elected by Santa Fe Province legislators. The Buenos Aires Province legislature elected Conservative Marcelino Ugarte, and the party also prevailed in San Juan, Santiago del Estero, and Tucumán. Jujuy Province's two senators were removed on April 21 by President Sáenz Peña amid allegations of electoral fraud in provincial legislature races, and Jujuy Republican Party candidates Octavio Iturbe and Carlos Zabala were certified in their stead; the development was another victory for de la Torre, to whose Liga del Sur Iturbe and Zabala also belonged.

== Results ==
Party or alliance		Votes	%	Seats	
Party or alliance		Votes	%	Won	Total
Conservative Parties	Conservative Party	119,339	17.49	15	—
Conservative Parties	Official Party	33,958	4.98	5	–
Conservative Parties	Liberal Party of Tucumán	29,155	4.27	2	–
Conservative Parties	Constitutional Party	23,582	3.46	6	–
Conservative Parties	Coalition Party	17,856	2.62	1	–
Conservative Parties	Popular Party	15,833	2.32	1	–
Conservative Parties	Liberal Party of Corrientes	14,515	2.13	2	–
Conservative Parties	Autonomist Party of Corrientes	14,367	2.11	2	–
Conservative Parties	Civic Concentration	8,593	1.26	0	–
Conservative Parties	National Autonomist Party	6,547	0.96	1	–
Conservative Parties	Total	283,745	41.58	35	90
Radical Civic Union		121,262	17.77	13	13
National Union		82,778	12.13	6	6
Civic Union		60,567	8.87	6	6
Socialist Party		37,020	5.42	2	2
Southern League		17,630	2.58	1	1
Communal Union		17,102	2.51	0	0
Rural Defense		1,643	0.24	0	0
Independents		60,714	8.90	0	0
Vacant seats				2	2
Total		682,461	100.00	65	120
Valid votes		602,613	92.05		
Invalid/blank votes		52,018	7.95		
Total votes		654,631	100.00		
Registered voters/turnout		935,001	70.01		
Source: Cantón, Chamber of Deputies
