= Fenia Chertkoff =

Argentine feminist, educator, translator and sculptor (1869–1927)

- Феня Чертков; Феня Черткова
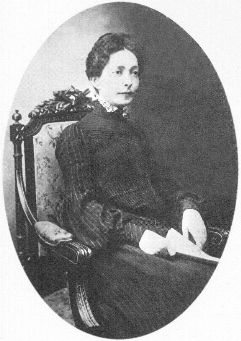
- Chertkoff c. 1900
- Born: Feniya Chertkova; 7 October 1869; Odesa, Kherson Governorate, Russian Empire (now Ukraine)
- Died: 31 May 1928 (aged 58); Buenos Aires, Argentina
- Other name: Fenia Chertkoff de Repetto
- Education: University of Paris; University of Lausanne
- Occupations: Feminist activist; educator; translator; sculptor
- Spouses: Gabriel Gukovsky (died 1894) Nicolás Repetto (m. 1901)
- Children: Victoria Gucovsky
- Relatives: Juan B. Justo (brother-in-law)

Fenia Chertkoff de Repetto (7 October 1869 – 31 May 1927), born Feniya Chertkova, was an Argentine feminist activist, educator, translator and sculptor. Chertkoff was the co-founder of the Socialist Women's Center (Spanish: Centro Femenino Socialista).

== Early life ==
Feniya Chertkova (Ukrainian: Феня Чертков; Russian: Феня Черткова) was born on 7 October 1869 in Odesa, Kherson Governorate (present-day, Ukraine) to Moisés Chertkoff (1841–1919) and Rosa Demirova (1848–1914). One of nine siblings, Chertkoff grew up in an upper middle-class Jewish family.

Chertkoff graduated as a teacher from St. Paul's German School (Note: Also cited as studying at St. Paul's German School, but graduating as a teacher from Odesa Normal School.), and also studied theater, music, and dance at the Tsarinas School.

== Career ==
In 1887, Chertkoff became involved in anti-Tsarist activities. Chertkoff began working as governess, where she met her future husband Gabriel Gukovsky, a poet, engineer and socialist. Gukovsky was later arrested by the Tsarist authorities and deported to Siberia.

Upon finishing his sentence, Gukovsky returned to Odesa with tuberculosis and the couple later settled in Genoa to improve Gukovsky's health. Following Gukovsky's death in 1894, Chertkoff returned to Odessa with her daughter. The same year Chertkoff settled in Switzerland before emigrating to Argentina in 1895.

=== Argentina ===
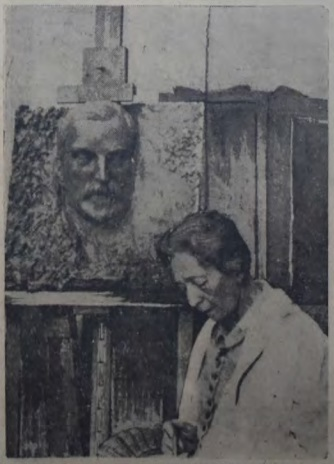
Chertkoff three days before her death, next to the bronze head of Juan B. Justo, 1928

In Argentina, Chertkoff settled in Colonia Santa Clara in Entre Ríos Province, an agricultural settlement founded by the Jewish Colonisation Association. Chertkoff's father was one of the colonies pioneers, and had been living in the colony with his wife and younger children since 1891 (Note: Also cited as 1904.). Founding a Russian and Yiddish language library in her own home, Chertkoff also worked as a translator for the Socialist press and taught Russian and Spanish.

During 1897 and 1898 (Note: Alsp cited as being 1897 to 1899.), Chertkoff studied pedagogy and child development at the Sorbonne, and Froebelist education at the University of Lausanne. Upon returning to Argentina, Chertkoff obtained citizenship and moved to Buenos Aires where she was introduced to the cities socialists through Enrique Dickmann.

On 19 April 1902 (Note: Also cited as 1920.), Chertkoff co-founded the Socialist Women's Center with Gabriela Laperrière de Coni, Justa Burgos Meyer, Raquel Messina, Teresa Mauli, Raquel Camaña and her sisters Mariana Chertkoff de Justo and Adela Chertkoff de Dickman. The Center promoted women's suffrage, equal civil and legal rights, divorce, the elimination of discrimination against children born out of wedlock and secular education. In 1903, Chertkoff participated as a delegate in Congress of the Socialist Party, which proposed, among other issues, gender equality, equality before the law for legitimate and illegitimate children, the enactment of divorce law, and paternity investigation. She participated in the first strikes of the workers and the trade union organization of workers in different industries, such as telephone, textiles, trade, and factories, contributing to enact laws for making Sunday a day of rest. She also denounced labor exploitation of minors, poor sanitary conditions in factories, and long working hours.

Following her daughter contracting tuberculosis in 1915, Chertkoff lived with her in Tío Pujio, Córdoba Province. Chertkoff founded a library, a farmers cooperative and organised a series of lectures. Returning to Buenos Aires in 1919, Chertkoff focused on painting and sculpture. In 1927, Chertkoff exhibited at the newly opened People's House (Spanish: Casa del Pueblo).

== Personal life ==
Chertkoff was married to Gabriel Gukovsky (died 1894), a poet, engineer and socialist, with whom she had one daughter, the teacher, writer, and socialist Victoria Gucovsky.

In 1901 (Note: Also cited as 1910.), Chertkoff married the physician and Socialist Party of Argentina politician Nicolás Repetto. Through her sisters Mariana and Adela, Chertkoff was the sister-in-law of Juan B. Justo, a physician, journalist, politician and writer, and Adolfo Dickman, a socialist politician and dentist.

On 31 May 1928 Chertkoff died in Buenos Aires, aged of 58.
