= Adelante =

"Adelante" is a Spanish word meaning forward. It may also refer to:

== Music ==
- "Adelante" (Operación Triunfo song), a song from Operación Triunfo fifth series (2004)
- "Adelante" (Sash! song), 2000 Sash! song featuring Peter Faulhammer & Rodriguez
- "Adelante", a 2000 song by the American band Ché
- Adelante, an album by the Chilean band Quilapayún
- Operación Triunfo 2006: Adelante, an album from Operación Triunfo

== Press ==
- Adelante (1902), an anarchist newspaper published in Spain
- Adelante (Argentine newspaper), a socialist newspaper founded 1916
- Adelante (Cuban newspaper), a Cuban newspaper started in 1959

== Other uses ==
- USS Adelante (SP-765) (1883), a former yacht known as Utowana and Oneida that was taken over by the U.S. Navy for service 1918–1919
- Adelante, former name of Napa Junction, California
- British Rail Class 180, a type of train
- Club Atlético Adelante, an Argentine sports club
