= Antonio de Tomaso =

Argentine politician

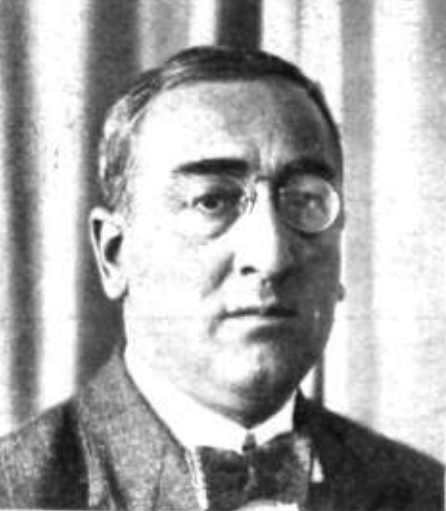
- De Tomaso in 1932

Minister of Agriculture
- In office 20 February 1932 – 3 August 1933
- President: Agustín Pedro Justo
- Preceded by: David Arias
- Succeeded by: Luis Duhau

National Deputy
- In office 12 October 1914 – 6 September 1930
- Constituency: City of Buenos Aires

Personal details
- Born: Antonio Di Tomasso; 26 June 1889; Buenos Aires, Argentina
- Died: 3 August 1933 (aged 44); Buenos Aires, Argentina
- Political party: Socialist Party (until 1927); Independent Socialist Party (1927–1933)
- Education: University of Buenos Aires
- Occupation: Lawyer

Antonio de Tomaso, born Antonio Di Tommaso (26 June 1889 – 3 August 1933), was an Argentine politician, Minister of Agriculture, and father of Alejandro de Tomaso.

== Biography ==
De Tomaso was born into an immigrant family from Southern Italy. The original family name (Di Tommaso) was changed by De Tomaso upon being nominated a stenographer in the National Congress of Argentina when he was 24. In 1914 he obtained a Law Degree from the University of Buenos Aires. The same year, he married Victoria Gucovsky, but separated in 1921. He later married Isabella Ceballos Arellano, from a prominent family of land-owners, with whom he fathered four children: Marcelo, Jaime, Alejandro, and Carlos.

De Tomaso was a member of the Socialist Party since 1907 and was elected to the National Chamber of Deputies in 1914 for the City of Buenos Aires. He remained until 1930, for a total of four legislatures. He participated as an Argentinian delegate to the Socialist International of 1919 at Bern, Switzerland. At Congress he interested on issues related to foreign policy and defense for the Socialist Party, but also participated in important debates on issues of economic and social legislation and contributed to the 1921 reform of the Criminal Code.

In 1927, following tension with the Government led by Hipólito Yrigoyen, he led a break up within the Socialist camp and founded the Independent Socialist Party (Partido Independiente Socialista). At the head of the new party, he sided in favor of the 1930 coup led by Agustín Pedro Justo, who became President in February 1932. Under the Justo administration, De Tomaso took office as Minister for Agriculture.

He died of a cardiac disease on 3 August 1933 in Buenos Aires at the age of 44.
