= Enrique Estévez =

Argentine politician (born 1983)

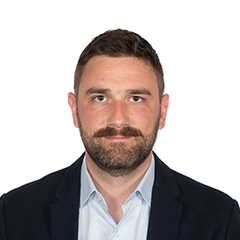

Minister of the Environment and Climate Change of Santa Fe
- Incumbent
- Assumed office 10 December 2023
- Governor: Maximiliano Pullaro
- Preceded by: Erika Gonnet

National Deputy
- In office 10 December 2019 – 10 December 2023
- Constituency: Santa Fe

Personal details
- Born: 12 July 1983 (age 43) Rosario, Argentina
- Party: Socialist Party
- Other political affiliations: Progressive, Civic and Social Front (2014–present); Federal Consensus (2019–present)

Enrique Eloy Estévez (born 12 July 1983) is an Argentine politician, currently serving as Minister of the Environment and Climate Change of Santa Fe Province, under Governor Maximiliano Pullaro. From 2019 to 2023, he was a National Deputy representing Santa Fe Province. He is a member of the member of the Socialist Party.

Estévez made a career within the Socialist Party in Santa Fe before being elected to the City Council of Rosario in 2015. He was Secretary General of the Socialist Party Youth and currently serves as Secretary General of the Santa Fe chapter of the Socialist Party.

== Early and personal life ==
Enrique Eloy Estévez Boero was born on 12 July 1983 in Rosario. His father was Guillermo Estévez Boero, a prominent Socialist politician and co-founder of the Popular Socialist Party.

== Political career ==
Estévez's political career began in the Socialist Party Youth. By 2013, he was secretary general of the Juventud Socialista, the party's youth wing. Estévez ran for a seat in the Rosario City Council in the 2015 municipal election, as part of the Progressive, Civic and Social Front list. The list was the most voted in the city, and Estévez was elected.

In 2016, Estévez was elected Secretary General of the Santa Fe Socialist Party. He was re-elected for a second mandate in 2021, with 68.8% of the vote.

At the 2019 legislative election, Estévez was the first candidate in the Federal Consensus list to the Chamber of Deputies. The list was the third-most voted, with 10.00% of the vote, and only Estévez was elected.

As a national deputy, Estévez formed part of the parliamentary commissions on Cooperative Affairs and NGOs, Education, Labour Legislation, Women and Diversity, and Petitions, Powers and Norms. Estévez was a supporter of the legalization of abortion in Argentina. He voted in favor of the 2020 Voluntary Interruption of Pregnancy bill, in line with the historic position of the Socialist Party.
