= Raquel Camaña =

Argentine teacher and activist (1883–1915)

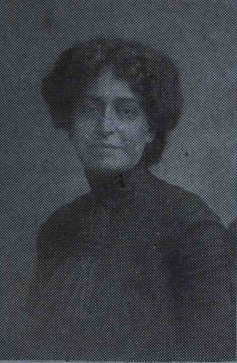
- Born: 30 September 1883; Buenos Aires, Argentina
- Died: 21 October 1915 (aged 32); Buenos Aires, Argentina
- Education: University of Buenos Aires
- Occupations: Teacher and activist

Raquel Camaña (30 September 1883 – 21 October 1915) was an Argentine teacher and activist who campaigned for the inclusion of sexual education in the school curriculum.

== Early life and education ==
Camaña was born in Buenos Aires, Argentina, in 1883. She was trained at the National Teacher Training School in La Plata, Buenos Aires, by American teacher Mary Olstine Graham. She also attended courses at the Faculty of Philosophy and Letters of the University of Buenos Aires, including logic, taught by José Nicolás Matienzo, and psychology, taught by José Ingenieros.

== Activism ==
Sexual prejudice and the Teaching Staff at the Faculty of Philosophy and Letters by Camaña (1910)

Camaña was a socialist and on 19 April 1902 she co-founded the Socialist Women's Center with Gabriela Laperrière de Coni, Justa Burgos Meyer, Raquel Messina, Teresa Mauli, Fenia Chertkoff, Mariana Chertkoff de Justo and Adela Chertkoff de Dickman. The Center promoted women's suffrage, equal civil and legal rights, divorce, the elimination of discrimination against children born out of wedlock and secular education.

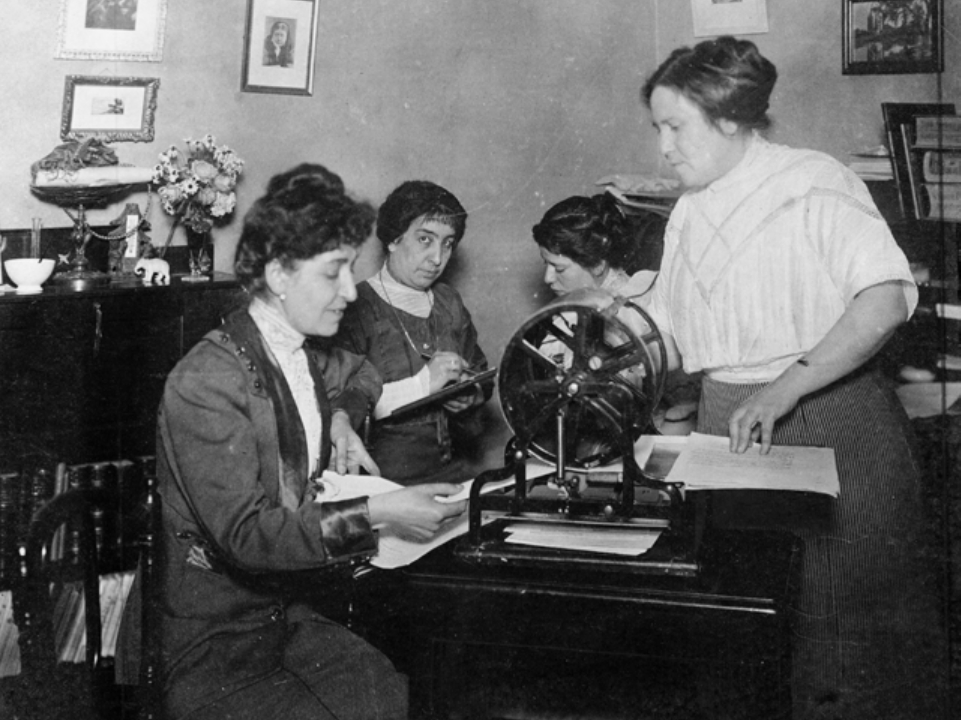
Julieta Lanteri and Camaña

Camaña an advocate of eugenics, arguing that the masses should be taught the conditions necessary for healthy reproduction to alleviate poverty. In 1910 she presented her thesis "the Sexual Question" to the Argentine Public Hygiene Society, who unanimously approved her recommendation for the inclusion of sexual education in the school curriculum. She was invited to attend the Third International Congress on School Hygiene in Paris, France (as an official government representative), the Congress of Pedagogy and Hygiene, held in Belgium, and to talks held at the Athenæum of Madrid (Spanish: Ateneo de Madrid) in Madrid, Spain. Camaña also established the League for the Rights of Women and Children Argentina and organised Argentina's First National Congress of Children with doctor and activist Julieta Lanteri in 1913. She published an article linking motherhood and democracy in 1914.

Humanidad Nueva magazine, 1915

When Camaña applied to the Faculty of Philosophy and Letters of the University of Buenos Aires to cover a substitute position in the Chair of Education Sciences, she was rejected as a candidate because of her gender. This prompted her to write about sexual prejudices faced by teachers for the journal Revista de Derecho, Historia y Letras.

== Death ==
Camaña died in Buenos Aires in 1915, aged 32. The magazine Humanidad Nueva dedicated a cover to Camaña after her death and her work was published posthumously in 1916.
