= 1963 Argentine general election =

- Presidential election
- 7 July 1963

476 members of the Electoral College 239 votes needed to win
- Registered: 11,356,240
- Turnout: 85.50%
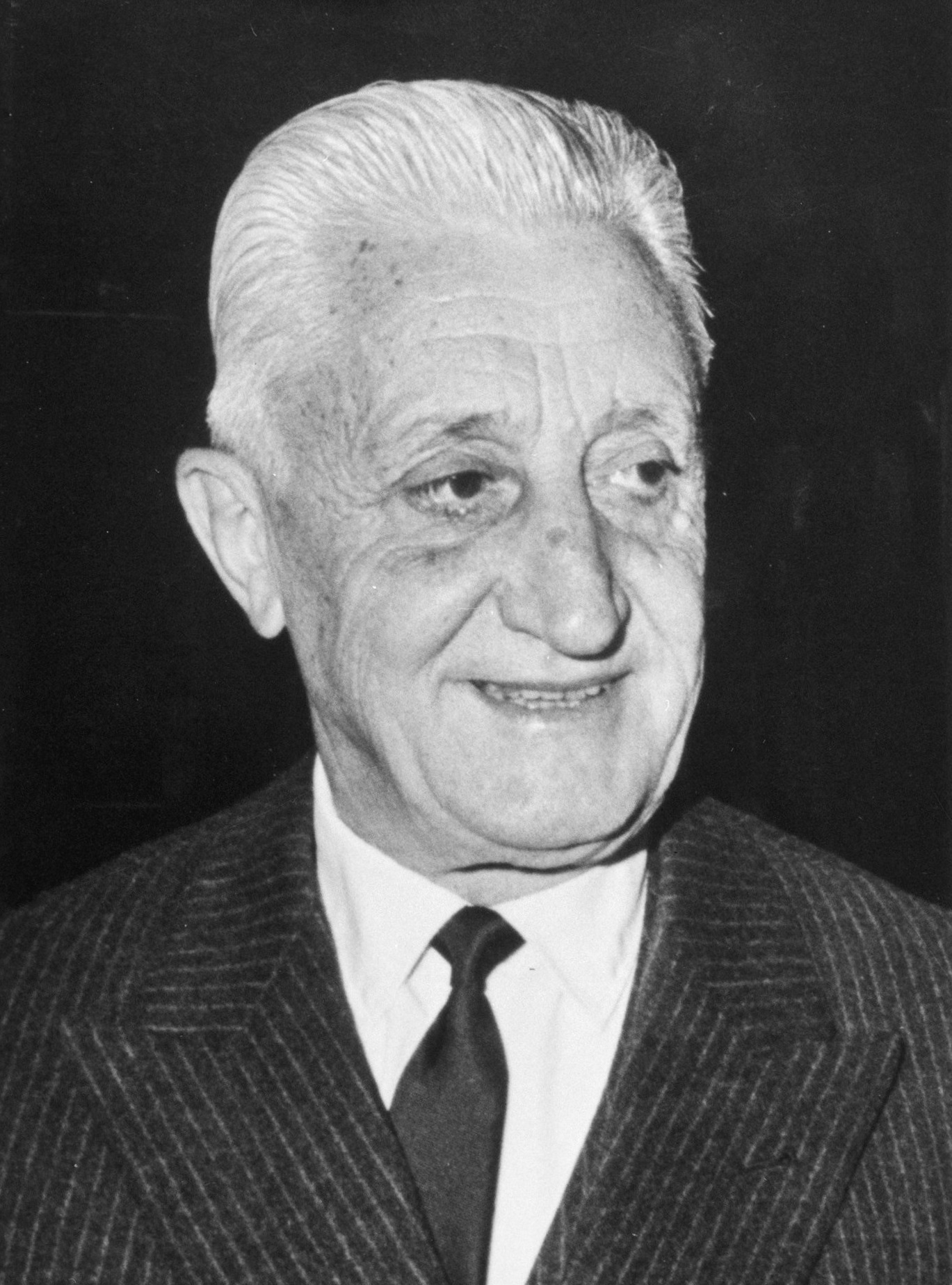

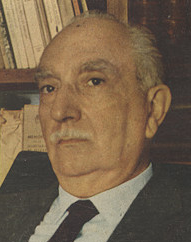

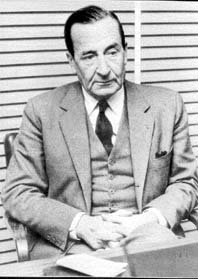
Nominee	Arturo Illia	Oscar Alende	Pedro Aramburu
Party	UCRP	UCRI	UDELPA
Running mate	Carlos Perette	Celestino Gelsi	Various
Electoral vote	270	86	74
Popular vote	2,441,064	1,593,002	1,362,596
Percentage	31.90%	20.82%	17.81%
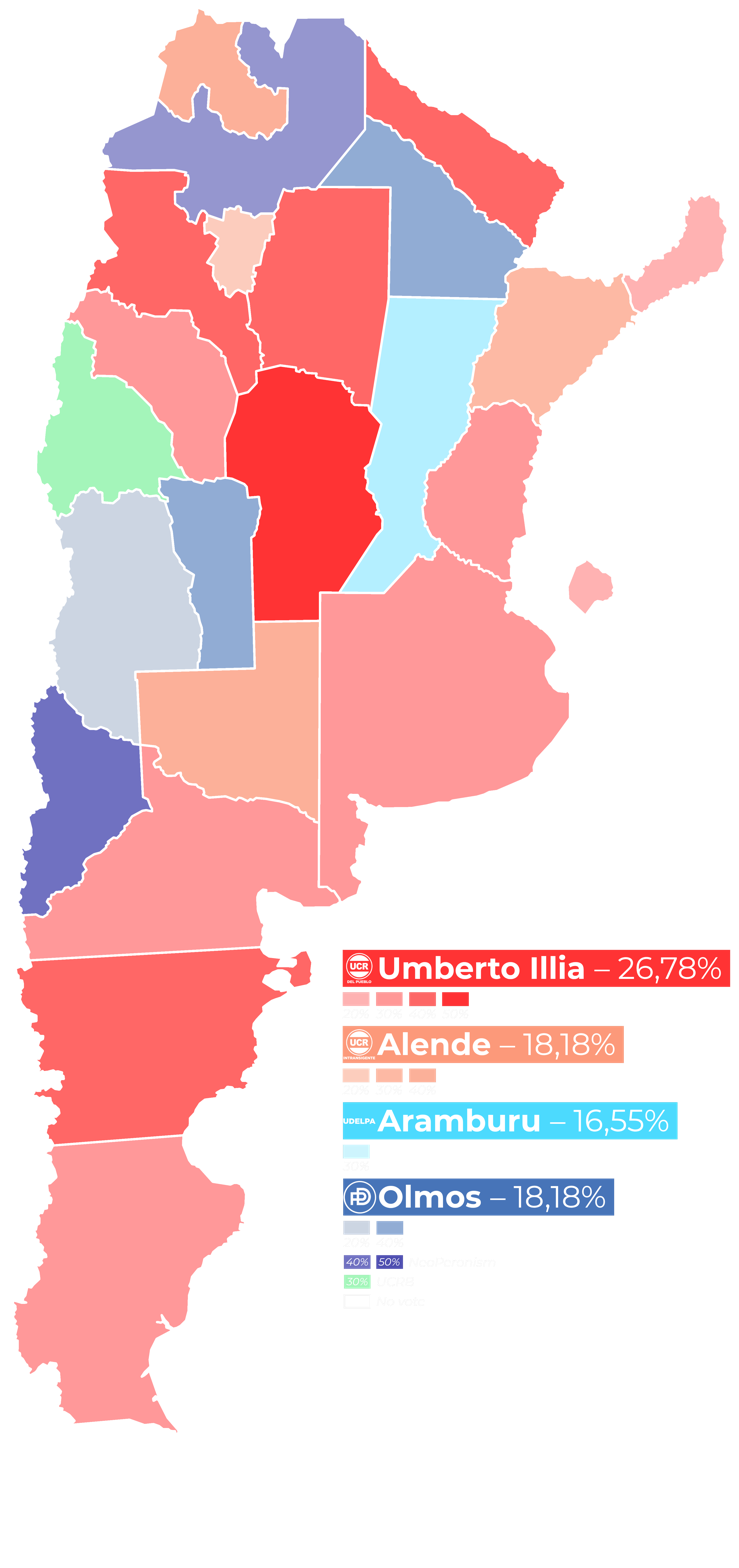
- Results by province
President before election
José María Guido
UCRI
Elected President
Arturo Illia
UCRP
- Legislative election
- 7 July 1963
- 192 seats in the Chamber of Deputies
- Turnout: 85.48%
Party	Vote %	Seats
People's Radical Civic Union	30.79	72
Intransigent Radical Civic Union	19.63	40
UDELPA–PDP	15.58	27
Neoperonists	9.00	17
National Federation of Centre Parties	6.14	10
Christian Democratic Party	5.55	7
Argentine Socialist Party	3.91	6
Democratic Socialist Party	3.90	5
Autonomist–Liberal Pact	1.29	4
Blockist Radical Civic Union	0.59	1
Renewal Crusade Radical Civic Union	0.41	1
Provincial Defence–White Flag	0.31	1
Provincial Party	0.21	1
This lists parties that won seats. See the complete results below.
Results by province

General elections were held in Argentina on 7 July 1963. Voters chose both the President and their legislators; with a turnout of 86%, resulting in the election of Arturo Illia as President of Argentina.

== Background ==
The spectre of military intervention so much in evidence after the election of Arturo Frondizi in 1958 became reality following his coerced resignation on March 29, 1962. His UCRI candidates had done well; but the evening's big surprise, Andrés Framini's election as Governor of Buenos Aires Province (one of ten Peronists to win gubernatorial polls that night), proved unacceptable to the armed forces. An array of political leaders had been lobbying the military against Frondizi, as well: centrist UCRP leader Ricardo Balbín (whom Frondizi defeated on a splinter ticket in 1958) and conservative economist Álvaro Alsogaray (whom Frondizi sidestepped in favor of pro-industry economist Rogelio Julio Frigerio) both openly celebrated the president's unceremonious exit.

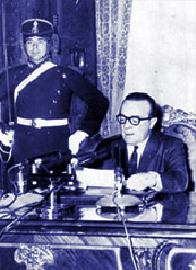
A military adjutant watches over interim President Guido, an unwitting metaphor as Army factions wrestled for control of his puppet regime.

The matter of Frondizi's successor, itself, became a subject of contention within the armed forces. The two opposing camps defined themselves as either "Blues" ((in Spanish) Azules, at pains to maintain a patina of legality over the destabilizing intervention) or "Reds" ((in Spanish) Colorados, lacking any compunction against imposing a prolonged and repressive dictatorship). The stalemate lasted merely a day because most of the Army High Command were "Blues," whose preference of a "legal" solution to the vacuum was supported by most of the press and the Argentine public, then enjoying Latin America's widest access to the media. Relying on constitutional guidelines, they named the reluctant Senate President José María Guido Head of State.

Guido, a moderate senator from then-remote Río Negro Province, had been elected on Frondizi's 's UCRI ticket. His prompt resignation from the UCRI and annulment of the March 18 mid-term elections did not immediately dispel the threat of a coup attempt, however, and mutinies in April and August resulted in the appointment of Army General Juan Carlos Onganía (who successfully rebelled against his "Red" superiors) as Head of the Military Joint Chiefs. The more stable military panorama was overshadowed by economic worries. Following a brief period of robust growth led by industrial production, President Guido's economic team, led by Alsogaray, imposed a fresh devaluation and austerity measures such as strict credit controls and even the payment of state salaries with nearly-worthless bonds. GDP fell by 4% in 1962-63 and unemployment rose to nearly 9%.

The Radical Civic Union (UCR) was again divided between the Intransigent (UCRI) and more conservative Popular (UCRP) factions as they convened in March 1963. The UCRP nominated former Córdoba Province Vice-Governor Arturo Illia, a country doctor fondly remembered for his work in the Public Health Committee in Congress; Balbín, who still led the UCRP, opted out of the nomination at the party's March 10 convention believing that a less anti-Peronist choice would give the UCRP a critical advantage over the rival UCRI.

The UCRI, as they had done in 1958, initially hoped to secure the exiled Juan Perón's endorsement who, from Madrid, still directly controlled a fifth of the Argentine electorate. Permitted to field local and Lower House candidates (but still banned from either the Senate or the Presidency) Peronist voters, like in 1962, rallied behind the UP and six other parties. Their intention to run in the less-than-free elections was itself in defiance of Perón, however, who refused to endorse "neo-Peronist" candidates and instead called for blank ballots. Alejandro Leloir, who had fallen out with fellow neo-Peronists as well as Perón, ran for president independently on the Three Flags ticket; named for the "three Peronist flags" of sovereignty, independence, and social justice, this became the only Peronist ticket allowed on the presidential ballot in 1963.

Against opposition from former Buenos Aires Governor Oscar Alende, Frondizi and Perón initially agreed on a "National Popular Front," fielding a respected, moderately conservative publisher as the nominee, Vicente Solano Lima. Tricked by a similar move in 1958, the military objected, however, leading to the brutal 1963 Argentine Navy Revolt on April 2, which cost 24 lives and effectively scuttled the Perón-Frondizi front. These incidents led former President Pedro Aramburu run on his UDELPA ticket, thus hoping to provide those most likely to support a military coup a suitable, center-right choice instead. He was also endorsed by the more moderate Democratic Progressive Party, whose leader, Horacio Thedy, ran as Aramburu's running mate; making fears of Perón's return his battle horse, Aramburu's slogan was unequivocal: Vote UDELPA...and HE won't return! Other anti-Peronist conservatives supported former Córdoba Mayor Emilio Olmos and the FNPC.

Hamstrung by Frondizi's open enmity against Alende for the latter's rejection of the ultimately aborted Front, as well as Perón's call for blank ballots, Alende's UCRI was defeated in an upset by Dr. Arturo Illia and the UCRP.

The renewed ban on the participation of Peronist candidates resulted in the highest percentage of blank votes in Argentine electoral history; Leloir's Three Flags ticket received 4 electoral votes.

== Candidates for President ==
- Radical Civic Union (centrist): Former Deputy Arturo Umberto Illia of Córdoba
- Intransigent Radical Civic Union (center-left): Former Governor Oscar Alende of Buenos Aires
- UDELPA (conservative): Former de facto President Pedro Eugenio Aramburu of Córdoba
- National Federation of Center Parties (conservative): Former Córdoba Mayor Emilio Olmos
- Christian Democratic Party (centrist): Former Deputy Horacio Sueldo of Buenos Aires
- Socialist Party: Former Senator Alfredo Palacios of Buenos Aires
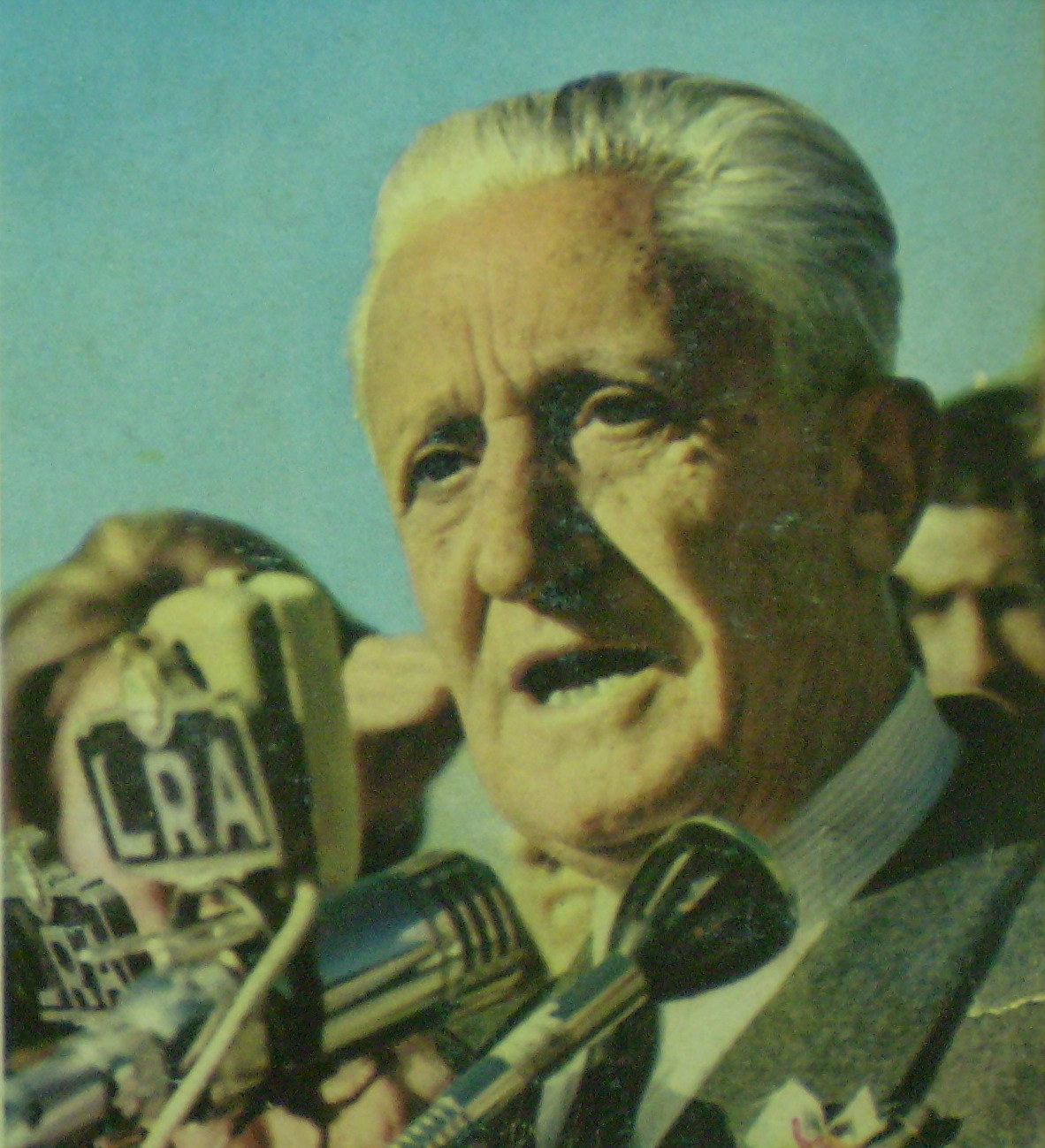
Illia

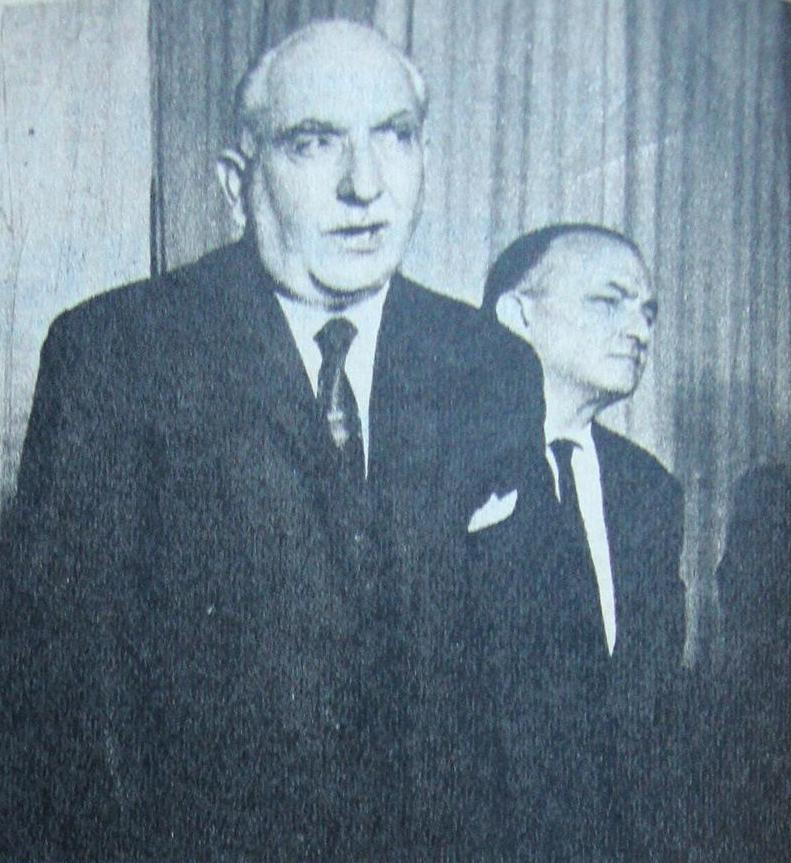
Alende

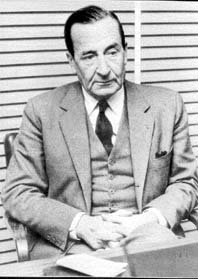
Aramburu

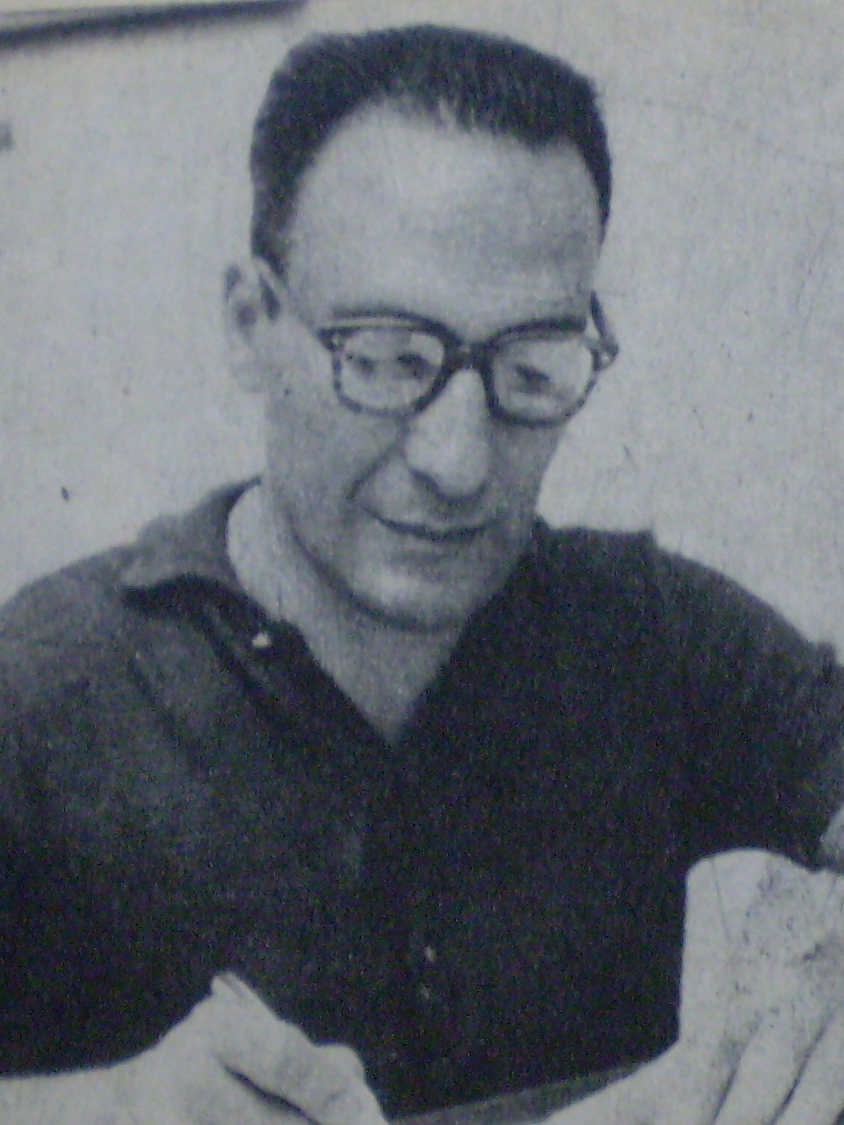
Sueldo

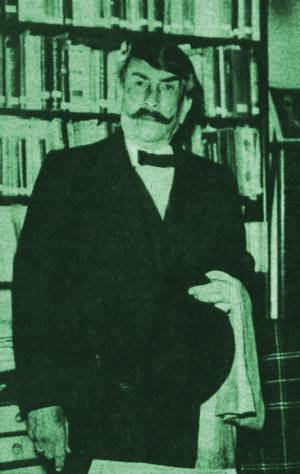
Palacios

== Results ==
=== President ===
Candidate	Running mate	Party or alliance		Popular vote		Electoral College		Electoral vote	
Candidate	Running mate	Party or alliance		Votes	%	Votes	%	Votes	%
Arturo Umberto Illia	Carlos Humberto Perette	People's Radical Civic Union		2,441,064	31.90	168	35.29	270	58.57
Oscar Alende	Celestino Gelsi	Intransigent Radical Civic Union		1,593,002	20.82	110	23.11	86	18.66
Pedro Eugenio Aramburu	Arturo J. Etchevehere	Aramburu	Union of the Argentine People	726,861	9.50	42	8.82	74	16.05
Pedro Eugenio Aramburu	Horacio Thedy	Aramburu	Democratic Progressive Party	619,481	8.10	30	6.30	74	16.05
Pedro Eugenio Aramburu		Aramburu	Misiones Alliance (UDELPA–PDP)	14,453	0.19	3	0.63	74	16.05
Pedro Eugenio Aramburu		Aramburu	UDELPA–PDP	1,801	0.02			74	16.05
Pedro Eugenio Aramburu		Aramburu	Total	1,362,596	17.81	75	15.76	74	16.05
Emilio Olmos Jr.	Emilio Jofré	National Federation of Centre Parties		511,779	6.69	31	6.51		
Horacio Sueldo	Francisco Eduardo Cerro	Christian Democratic Party		434,823	5.68	23	4.83		
Alfredo Palacios	Ramón I. Soria	Argentine Socialist Party		278,856	3.64	12	2.52	12	2.60
Alfredo Orgaz	Rodolfo Fitte	Democratic Socialist Party		258,787	3.38	10	2.10		
Justo León Bengoa	Alejandro H. Leloir	Bengoa	Social Justice Party	83,302	1.09	4	0.84	1	0.22
Justo León Bengoa	Alejandro H. Leloir	Bengoa	National Front Movement	40,164	0.52	1	0.21	1	0.22
Justo León Bengoa	Alejandro H. Leloir	Bengoa	Labour Party	20,560	0.27			1	0.22
Justo León Bengoa	Alejandro H. Leloir	Bengoa	National Independent Party	6,745	0.09			1	0.22
Justo León Bengoa	Alejandro H. Leloir	Bengoa	Total	150,771	1.97	5	1.05	1	0.22
Alejandro H. Leloir		Three Flags Party		113,941	1.49	7	1.47	4	0.87
		White Party		70,860	0.93	3	0.63		
		Liberal Party of Corrientes		59,696	0.78	5	1.05		
		Blockist Radical Civic Union		46,088	0.60	4	0.84		
		Democratic Federal Movement		42,116	0.55	5	1.05		
		Autonomist Party of Corrientes		38,907	0.51	3	0.63		
		Agrarian Social Party		37,630	0.49				
		Renewal Crusade Radical Civic Union		31,718	0.41	3	0.63		
		National Union		30,730	0.40	1	0.21		
		Provincial Defence–White Flag		23,437	0.31	2	0.42		
Juan Francisco Castro		National Action		22,993	0.30				
		Neuquén People's Movement		20,648	0.27	6	1.26		
		Provincial Party		16,086	0.21	2	0.42		
		Colorado Party		10,929	0.14				
		Democratic Conservative People's Party		10,493	0.14				
		Socialist Party		9,483	0.12				
		People's Party		9,371	0.12				
		Democratic Concentration		6,028	0.08				
		Popular Intransigent Radical Civic Union		5,301	0.07	1	0.21		
		Misiones Popular Civic Union		4,212	0.06				
		Blue and White Party		3,993	0.05				
		La Rioja Radical Civic Union		2,705	0.04				
		Autonomist Democratic Party		1,337	0.02				
		Formosa Civic Union		945	0.01				
		Argentine Socialist Vanguard Party		475	0.01				
		Conservative Provincial Workers Party		185	0.00				
Carlos Sylvestre Begnis		Intransigent Radical Civic Union						11	2.39
Edmundo Eduardo Blanchet		Three Flags Party						3	0.65
Total				7,651,985	100.00	476	100.00	461	100.00
Valid votes				7,651,985	78.80			461	99.35
Invalid votes				173,696	1.79			0	0.00
Blank votes				1,884,435	19.41			3	0.65
Total votes				9,710,116	100.00			464	100.00
Registered voters/turnout				11,356,240	85.50			476	97.48
Source: Cantón, Ministry of the Interior, Nohlen

=== Chamber of Deputies ===
Party or alliance		Votes	%	Seats		
Party or alliance		Votes	%	1963–1965	1963–1967	Total
People's Radical Civic Union		2,419,269	30.79	36	36	72
Intransigent Radical Civic Union		1,542,072	19.63	20	20	40
UDELPA–PDP	Union of the Argentine People	654,392	8.33	7	7	14
UDELPA–PDP	Democratic Progressive Party	555,891	7.08	6	6	12
UDELPA–PDP	Misiones Alliance	12,110	0.15	0	1	1
UDELPA–PDP	UDELPA–PDP	1,737	0.02	0	0	–
UDELPA–PDP	Total	1,224,130	15.58	13	14	27
Neoperonism	Popular Union	165,922	2.11	3	1	4
Neoperonism	Three Flags Party	113,715	1.45	1	2	3
Neoperonism	White Party	71,149	0.91	0	1	1
Neoperonism	People's Party	70,031	0.89	0	0	0
Neoperonism	Social Justice Party	66,976	0.85	1	0	1
Neoperonism	National Labour Party	54,449	0.69	0	2	2
Neoperonism	Workers' White Party	46,777	0.60	0	2	2
Neoperonism	Democratic Federal Movement	42,491	0.54	0	1	1
Neoperonism	National Front Movement	40,649	0.52	0	0	0
Neoperonism	Labour Party	31,969	0.41	0	0	0
Neoperonism	San Luis Popular Action	23,126	0.29	1	0	1
Neoperonism	Neuquén People's Movement	20,572	0.26	2	0	2
Neoperonism	National Independent Party	7,087	0.09	0	0	0
Neoperonism	Total	707,177	9.00	8	9	17
National Federation of Centre Parties	Democratic Party	191,751	2.44	2	2	4
National Federation of Centre Parties	Conservative Union	141,619	1.80	1	2	3
National Federation of Centre Parties	Conservative Democratic Party	52,134	0.66	1	0	1
National Federation of Centre Parties	Liberal Democratic Party	38,842	0.49	1	0	1
National Federation of Centre Parties	United Democratic Party	27,719	0.35	0	1	1
National Federation of Centre Parties	Provincial Union	15,477	0.20	0	0	0
National Federation of Centre Parties	Conservative Party	8,141	0.10	0	0	0
National Federation of Centre Parties	Popular Democratic Party	5,121	0.07	0	0	0
National Federation of Centre Parties	Misiones Liberal Party	1,202	0.02	0	0	0
National Federation of Centre Parties	Total	482,006	6.14	5	5	10
Christian Democratic Party		436,932	5.56	3	4	7
Argentine Socialist Party		306,870	3.91	3	3	6
Democratic Socialist Party		306,648	3.90	3	2	5
Autonomist–Liberal Pact		101,193	1.29	2	2	4
Blockist Radical Civic Union		46,365	0.59	1	0	1
Social Agrarian Party		37,297	0.47	0	0	0
Renewal Crusade Radical Civic Union		32,050	0.41	1	0	1
National Union		26,961	0.34	0	0	0
Provincial Defence–White Flag		24,422	0.31	0	1	1
National Action Crusade		21,335	0.27	0	0	0
Union of Argentine Retirees		18,613	0.24	0	0	0
Provincial Party		16,333	0.21	1	0	1
Colorado Party		11,031	0.14	0	0	0
Conservative Democratic People's Party		10,635	0.14	0	0	0
Socialist Party		9,415	0.12	0	0	0
Democratic Concentration		6,310	0.08	0	0	0
People's Intransigent Radical Civic Union		5,338	0.07	0	0	0
Misiones Popular Civic Union		4,099	0.05	0	0	0
Blue and White Party		3,948	0.05	0	0	0
La Rioja Radical Civic Union		2,826	0.04	0	0	0
National Action-Civic Union of Workers		1,672	0.02	0	0	0
Democratic Autonomist Party		1,465	0.02	0	0	0
Formosa Civic Union		960	0.01	0	0	0
National Workers' Party		760	0.01	0	0	0
Argentine Socialist Vanguard Party		448	0.01	0	0	0
Provincial Conservative Workers' Party		184	0.00	0	0	0
Total		7,856,500	100.00	96	96	192
Valid votes		7,856,500	80.94			
Invalid/blank votes		1,850,546	19.06			
Total votes		9,707,046	100.00			
Registered voters/turnout		11,356,235	85.48			
