= Arroyo Cabral =

- Locality
- Location of Arroyo Cabral in Argentina Arroyo Cabral (Argentina)
- Coordinates: 32°29′21″S 63°24′08″W
- Country: Argentina
- Province: Córdoba
- Department: General San Martín

Government
  - Intendant: Raúl Mariscalchi
- Elevation: 138 m (453 ft)

Population (2010 census)
  - Total: 5,573
- Time zone: UTC−3 (ART)
- CPA base: X5900
- Dialing code: +54 353

Arroyo Cabral is a locality in Córdoba Province, Argentina, part of the General San Martín Department.
