= El Trommel =

El Trommel was a socialist fortnightly newspaper published from El Astillero, Spain 1906–1908. Diego Pérez Reventún was the editor of El Trommel. El Trommel was printed at La Ideal printing shop in Santander. The price for subscription was 50 centimos per trimester. El Trommel substituted an earlier socialist publication, La Voz del Pueblo.

The editorial line caused discomfort to the mayor of El Astillero, Casimiro Tijero. El Trommel was closed down in January 1908 after the newspaper had been forced to pay a deposit of 2,000 pesetas and court had issued a fine against it for 125 pesetas after complaints from Tijero. A similar tactic had been used to enforce the closure of La Voz del Pueblo a few years earlier.
