= Adelante (1902) =

Newspaper founded in 1902

- Founded: 1 May 1902
- Ceased publication: 8 March 1903
- Political alignment: Anarchism
- Language: Spanish language
- Headquarters: Travesía de San Matías, 1, Santander 43.46464244427089°N 3.81037581913305°W
- City: Santander
- Country: Spain

Adelante (Forward) was an anarchist weekly workers newspaper published from Santander, Spain 1902–1903. During its nine-month existence the newspaper attracted a significant grouping of contributors. The newspaper was noted for being engaged in a protracted feud with the Marxist socialist movement.

== Launching ==
The first issue was published on 1 May 1902, as a special International Workers' Day issue. It had the by-line 'Workers Sociological Weekly'. The newspaper also carried the slogan 'Solidarity and Science'. The newspaper was printed at Imprenta El Dobra in Torrelavega, as no printing shop in Santander itself was willing to print an openly anarchist organ.

== Editors and contributors ==
Diego Cortázar was the director of the newspaper during its initial period, but the management of the newspaper was later taken over by Francisco G. Moldes (from 24 August 1902); then José Manuel Méndez (from 5 October 1902) and finally Juan Blanco (from 7 December 1902). The editorial team of Adelante consisted of Anastasio Juan Herrero Muñoz, Eduardo Pérez Iglesias, J. Manuel Hernández, Jesús de Amber and Tortajada (the latter from Torrelavega). Adelante frequently printed texts authored by Diego Martínez Barrio, which gradually moved towards radical republicanism. Other contributors included Emilio Carral, José Montero Iglesias, Vicente Blanco, Vicente Daza and Francisco Pi y Arsuaga. The newspaper often reprinted articles taken from El País, Tierra y Libertad, Les Temps nouveaux and El Rebelde.

== Format ==
Adelante was published on Sundays. It was sold through seven kiosks, as well as through street newspaper vendors in Santander. Copies were sold for 5 céntimos, whilst 3-month subscriptions were sold for 1 peseta. The newspaper had a 42.9 × 31.2 cm format with four columns, and issues contained four pages.

== Feud with the socialists ==
Adelante rejected 'workerism', and used a derogatory tone against its proponents. Adelante was noted for its hostility towards the Spanish Socialist Workers' Party, expressed through the rivalry with the socialist organ La Voz del Pueblo. The repeated insults against the socialist press provoked the beating up of the Adelante editor.

== Closure ==
The last issue of Adelante was published on 8 March 1903. In total 42 issues of Adelante were published.
