= Mary Olstine Graham =

American educator (1842–1902)

- Born: August 13, 1842; St. Louis, Missouri, United States
- Died: March 10, 1902 (aged 59); La Plata, Buenos Aires Province, Argentina
- Burial place: Bellefontaine Cemetery, St. Louis, Missouri, United States
- Education: Winona Normal School
- Occupation: educator
- Employer: San Juan Normal School

Mary Olstine Graham (August 13, 1842 – March 10, 1902) was an American educator who led the largest normal school in Argentina.

== Early life ==
Graham was born in 1842 in St. Louis, Missouri. Her parents were William Hanna Graham and Catherine Graham (née Shaw). She attended Winona Normal School.

== Career ==
During her early teaching career, she taught in St. Louis.

In 1879, Graham was personally invited to Argentina by Domingo Faustino Sarmiento who, following his term as President of Argentina, had been appointed the General Director of Schools for the Province of Buenos Aires and the Senator for San Juan. She arrived in Argentina from Boston, Massachusetts.

In Argentina, she was tasked with directing the normal school in San Juan, which had been established by President Miguel Juárez Celman. After working for eight years at the San Juan Normal School, Graham transferred to La Plata, where she built a school complex.

== Death and legacy ==
Graham died in 1902 in La Plata, Partido de La Plata, Buenos Aires. Her body was repatriated to the United States, and buried in the Bellefontaine Cemetery in St. Louis, Missouri.

Former students established the Mary O. Graham Center in 1906.

Her students include Raquel Camaña.
