= Union of the Argentine People =

Political party in Argentina

Union of the Argentine People Unión del Pueblo Argentino
- Abbreviation: UdelPA or UDELPA
- Leader: Pedro Eugenio Aramburu (1962–1970)
- Founder: Pedro Eugenio Aramburu
- Founded: 1st: 2 January 1962; 2nd: 24 August 1972
- Dissolved: 1st: 28 June 1966 (prohibited); 2nd: 1987
- Succeeded by: Popular Federalist Alliance
- Headquarters: Buenos Aires
- Ideology: Before 1973: Militarism; Liberal conservatism Conservatism; Economic liberalism Anti-Peronism; Antipopulism; Neo-peronism (as tool); After 1973: Anti-Imperialism; Socialization
- Political position: Before 1973: Right-wing; After 1973: Left-wing
- National affiliation: UDELPA-PDP (1963)
- Colors: Blue

Election symbol

The Union of the Argentine People was an Argentine right-wing political party founded on 2 January 1962 by Pedro Eugenio Aramburu, with the goal of establish an antiperonist rightist political party which is controlled by the Armed Forces, that could count on the massive support of the middle class and thus be able to successfully oppose Peronism. Pedro Eugenio Aramburu himself, who in 1964 specified the objective of Udelpa by stating that "this is an anti-Peronist party." Initially before the party was founded, the Aramburu dictatorship had attempted to organize the Radical Civic Union as an anti-Peronist right-wing party, but the existence of a large sector within it, led by Arturo Frondizi, in favor of an alliance with Peronism, caused the project to fail. Udelpa adopted the slogan "Vote UDELPA y no vuelve" (Vote for UDELPA and he won't come back), referring to Perón (whose mention was prohibited by the laws passed by the dictatorship that called itself the Revolución Libertadora). Aramburu had oscillated between an openly anti-Peronist strategy, or fragmenting Peronism by trying to unite anti-Peronists with "Peronists without Perón" (Neo-Peronism). Led by him and in a coalition with the Democratic Progressive Party, it would reach third place in the 1963 Presidential election, getting 17.81% of the votes. The party was dissolved by the 1966 Coup, which declared the abolition of all political parties. Though the party had a rebirth in 1972, the assassination of Aramburu and the lack of a strong leadership forced them to merge in a coalition with the Popular Federalist Alliance, led by ex-Navy Captain Francisco Manrique.
