= La Voz del Pueblo (Santander) =

La Voz del Pueblo ('People's Voice') was a socialist weekly newspaper from Santander, Spain, published as a regional organ of the Spanish Socialist Workers Party in Cantabria 1898–1905. The newspaper was printed on Sundays. La Voz del Pueblo was the first socialist newspaper in the province. Isidoro Acevedo, Manuel Olivero and Álvaro Ortiz were the directors of La Voz del Pueblo. From October 15, 1899 (its 62nd issue) onwards La Voz del Pueblo was edited at the workshop of the daily El Cantábrico, at Calle de la Compañía.

The Santander socialists competed with the local anarchist movement over the domination of the labour movement in the city, a rivalry expressed through competition between La Voz del Pueblo and the anarchist organ Adelante.

In July 1905 Matías Ramo took over as director of La Voz del Pueblo, as Acevedo had moved to Bilbao to run La Lucha de Clases there. At the time La Voz del Pueblo was facing a dire economic situation, largely due to its refusal to accept paid advertisements from local traders. Moreover, it had problems with standing payments from some of its distributors.

== See also ==
- El Trommel
