= Alfredo Bravo =

Argentine politician (1925–2003)

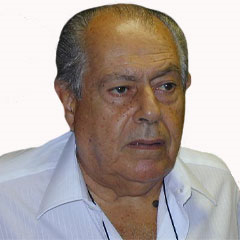
Alfredo Bravo

Alfredo Bravo (30 April 1925 – 26 May 2003) was an Argentine Socialist politician, teacher, leader of the teachers' union CTERA, human rights fighter, and legislator.

== Life and times ==
Bravo was born in Concepción del Uruguay, Entre Ríos Province. He studied in Avellaneda, Buenos Aires Province, and became a teacher at 18. Teaching in the rural north of Santa Fe Province, he returned upon being called for compulsory military training. He moved to Buenos Aires afterwards, where he joined the union movement.

Bravo left the Socialist Party in 1957, since he opposed the participation of many of his fellow party members in the Consultative Junta convened by the military regime that had ousted President Juan Perón two years earlier. He took part in the writing of the Teacher's Statute, and was involved in the 1973 unification of the teachers' labour movement into the Education Workers Confederation of the Argentine Republic (CTERA), of which he became Secretary General.

On September 8, 1977, about a year and a half after the coup d'état that started the dictatorship of the National Reorganization Process, Bravo was kidnapped by a government task force while he was teaching. He remained "disappeared" until September 20, and was only released in 1979. During his detention he was tortured, which left him with vascular damage in his legs. Bravo recognized Buenos Aires Provincial Police officer Miguel Etchecolatz and General Ramón Camps as his torturers.

Once freed, he became a human rights militant at the Permanent Assembly for Human Rights (APDH). President Raúl Alfonsín, who was elected democratically in 1983 and ordered the trial of the dictatorship's leaders, appointed him Subsecretary of State in the area of Education; however, Bravo resigned after the passing of the Full Stop Law and the Due Obedience Law, which halted judicial procedures on many people involved in the crimes of the dictatorial period.

Bravo returned to his party (the moderate faction, called Democratic Socialist Party) in the late 1980s, and was elected a National Deputy in 1991. He was reelected in 1995 and 1999. He became a personal friend of his fellow Deputy Elisa Carrió, founder of ARI (although the relationship would deteriorate in the following years, culminating in an acrimonious split in 2002), and participated in the Alliance for Work, Justice and Education, which brought Fernando de la Rúa to the presidency in the 1999 elections, though he later distanced himself from de la Rúa's austerity policies.

As a fan of River Plate, que was a member of the Representative's Assembly for the Agrupación Tradicional, between 1993 and 1997. In 1997, he ran for president. In 2001, Alfredo Bravo was part of the formula of the Agrupación Tradicional who had Carlos Lancioni as candidate for president.

In 2001 he ran for senator representing the City of Buenos Aires and obtained enough votes to win a seat, but a legal conflict led to the assumption of Gustavo Béliz instead. In the 2003 elections he ran for President (with Rubén Giustiniani as candidate for Vice-President); but only gathered about 1% of the vote.

On the early hours of May 26, 2003, one day after the inauguration of President Néstor Kirchner, Bravo suffered a heart attack and died. He was waked at the Salón de los Pasos Perdidos of the Argentine Congress, attended by figures from across the political establishment.
