= Centro de Estudios Carlos Marx =

Centro de Estudios Carlos Marx (Karl Marx Study Centre) was a left-wing group in Argentina. The Centre was founded in 1912 by a dissident group within the Socialist Party. This was the first organized expression of opposition to the reformist leadership of the party. The Centre published Palabra Socialista.
