= Comité de Propaganda Gremial =

Comité de Propaganda Gremial was a centre of trade union activism in Argentina, formed by the leftist opposition inside Socialist Party in 1915. The Committee successfully strengthened the presence of the socialists within the trade union movement. The Committee was however dissolved in 1917 by the party leadership, claiming that the party should not interfere in trade union affairs.
