= Américo Ghioldi =

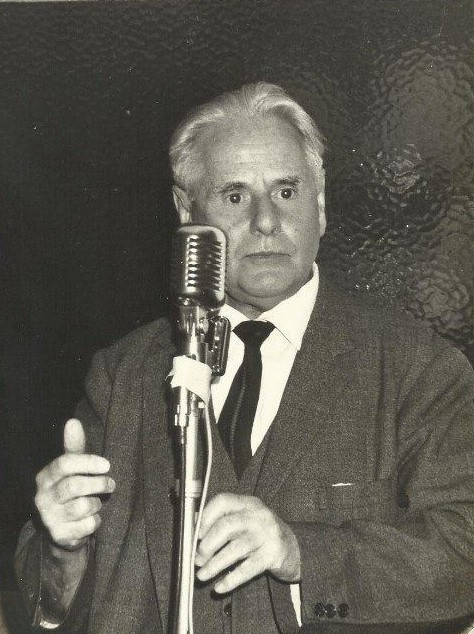
Américo Ghioldi in 1965

Américo Ghioldi (May 23, 1899 – December 21, 1985) was an Argentine educator, publisher and prominent Socialist politician.

== Life and times ==
Ghioldi was born and raised in Buenos Aires. He went to become a Professor of Exact Sciences at the National Teachers' School in Buenos Aires and around 1930, founded La Vanguardia, soon among the leading Socialist dailies in Argentina. Encouraged by his brother, local Communist Party head Rodolfo Ghioldi, he ran as a Socialist for a seat in the Buenos Aires City Council, and was elected in 1948. Becoming one of the few prominent left-wing lawmakers during the era of populist leader Juan Perón, Ghioldi was harassed by the Peronist regime and La Vanguardia was shuttered.

Following Perón's violent 1955 overthrow, Gholdi was invited to take part in the influential Civilian Advisory Board called by junta leader General Eduardo Lonardi. He was elected to the Constituent Assembly of August 1957, entrusted to determine which among Perón's many constitutional changes should stand. The Socialist Party's 1958 convention, however, could arrive on no agreement as to their degree of opposition to Peronism (which, despite its ban, remained a powerful political force, skillfully managed by their leader in exile). Ghioldi broke from the party leadership, establishing a Democratic Socialist Party more opposed to Peronists than the Socialist Party would be. Faring modestly in 1963 elections, in which they split the socialist vote of 6% about evenly with the Socialist Party, Ghioldi devoted more time to academia, teaching at the University of Buenos Aires and University of La Plata and honored with a numerary membership in the prestigious Argentine Educational Academy.

Ghioldi was again nominated on the Democratic Socialist ticket for elections held on March 11, 1973. His party fared poorly, however, garnering about 1% of the vote and badly outdistanced by the Socialists. Following President Juan Perón's July 1974 passing, Ghioldi advised his widow and successor, Isabel Perón on the imminent wave of violence between Trotskyite and fascist extremists, warnings Mrs. Perón ignored.

Ghioldi was increasingly respected by Argentine conservatives, in his later years. A lifelong Socialist, he contributed regularly to La Nación, Argentina's most prominent conservative daily. The regime that deposed Isabel Perón, despite their violently right-wing ideology, named Ghioldi Ambassador to Portugal in 1976.

He died in Buenos Aires in 1985 at age 85. His body lay in state at the Buenos Aires City Council's grand hall.
