= Ticino, Argentina =

Ticino
- Village
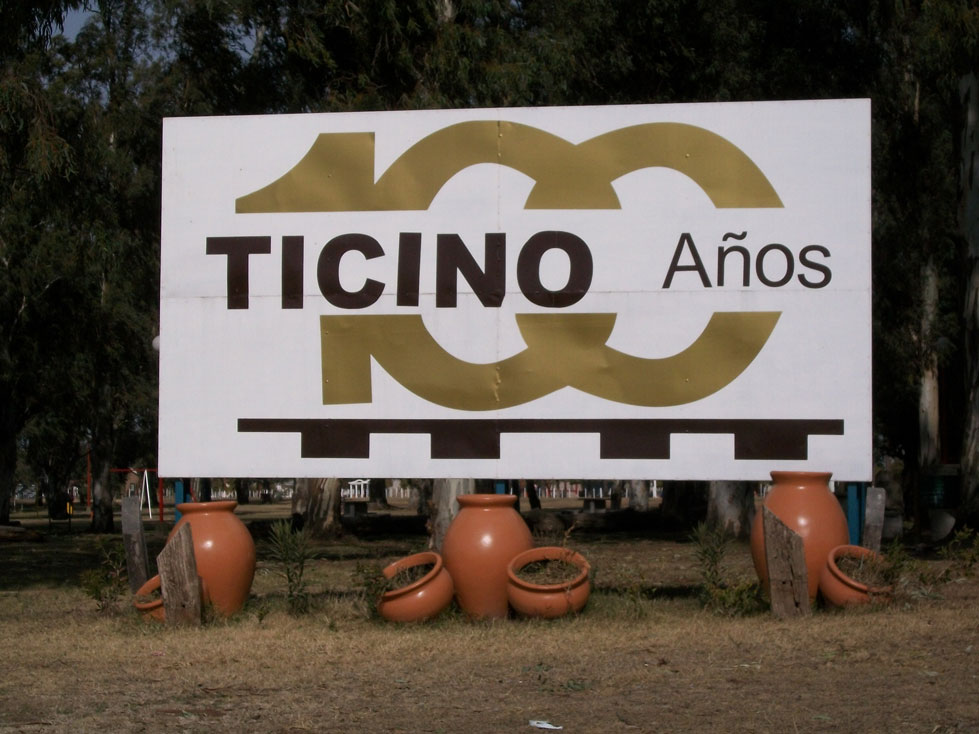

- Location within Córdoba Province Location within Argentina
- Coordinates: 32°41′35″S 63°26′13″W
- Country: Argentina
- Province: Córdoba
- Department: General San Martín
- Foundation: 1911

Government
  - Intendant: Gabriel Cañas (UCR)
- Elevation: 138 m (453 ft)

Population (2010)
  - Total: 2,188
- Time zone: UTC−3 (ART)

Ticino is a village located in the General San Martín Department in the Province of Córdoba in central Argentina.

== History ==
Ticino was founded in 1911, by two Italian-Swiss immigrants Ricardo Simonini and Juan Thiele. The village was born and grew based on the dynamics of the railroad, a classic settlement next to the tracks. It is assumed that the name Ticino was chosen to represent the Ticino river and the canton of the same name.

== Economy ==
The main economic activity is agriculture followed by livestock, the main crops being soybeans, corn and peanuts.

Likewise, the Lorenzati and Ruetsch Thermoelectric Power Plant, located in that town in Córdoba, supplies energy to approximately 6,500 homes by processing the shell of peanuts produced and processed locally. This allowed them to remain active during the Argentine blackout of 2019, with Ticino being the only village in the entire country that was able to quickly restore the service.
