= General San Martín Department, Córdoba =

General San Martín Department Departamento General San Martín
- Department
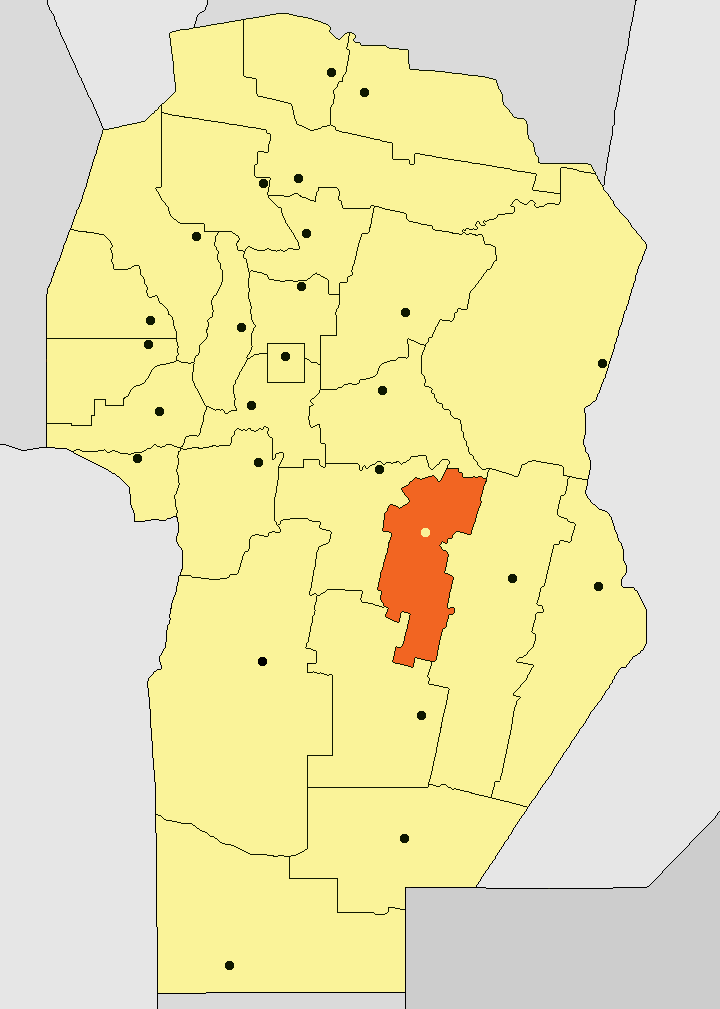
- Location of General San Martín Department in Córdoba Province
- Coordinates: 32°25′S 63°14′W
- Country: Argentina
- Province: Córdoba
- Capital: Villa María

Area
  - Total: 5,006 km^{2} (1,933 sq mi)

Population (2001 census [INDEC])
  - Total: 116,107
  - Density: 23.19/km^{2} (60.07/sq mi)
  - Pop. change (1991-2001): +10.41%
- Time zone: UTC-3 (ART)
- Postal code: X5900
- Dialing code: 0353
- Distances to
- Buenos Aires: 600 km (370 mi)
- Córdoba: 180 km (110 mi)

General San Martín Department is a department of Córdoba Province in Argentina.

The provincial subdivision has a population of about 116,107 inhabitants in an area of 5,006 km^{2}, and its capital city is Villa María, which is located around 600 km from Buenos Aires.

== Settlements ==
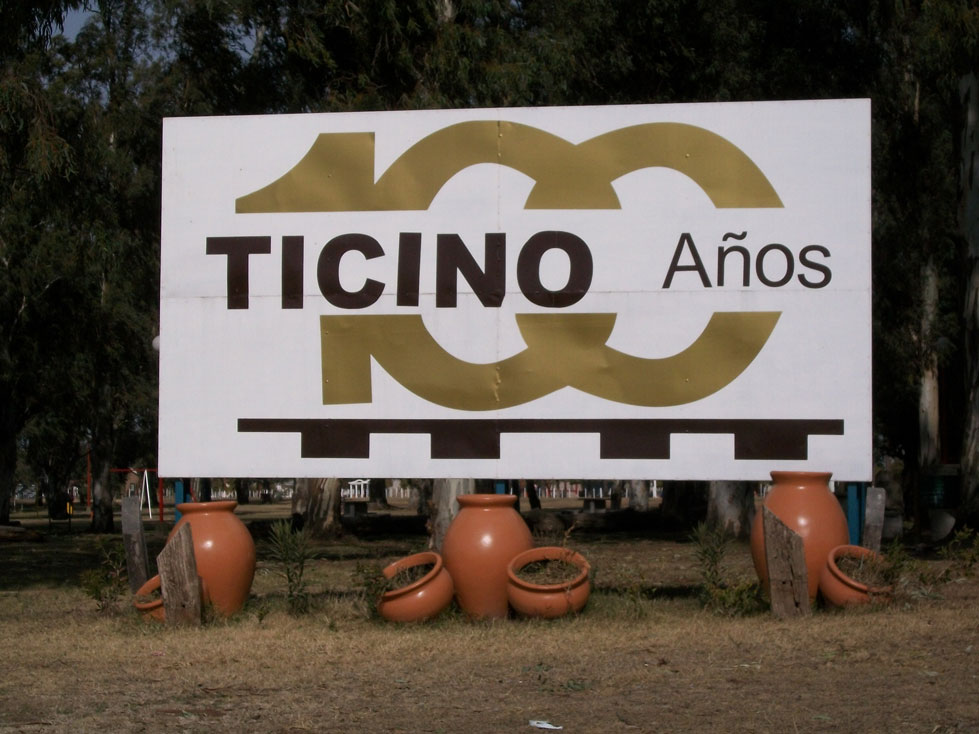

- Arroyo Algodón
- Arroyo Cabral
- Ausonia
- Chazón
- Etruria
- La Laguna
- La Palestina
- La Playosa
- Luca
- Pasco
- Silvio Pellico
- Ticino
- Tío Pujio
- Villa María
- Villa Nueva
