= Adelante (Argentine newspaper) =

Adelante ('Forward') was a socialist newspaper in Argentina, founded in April 1916 by young left wing dissidents of the Socialist Party.

The group behind Adelante upheld Marxist and internationalist principles, and opposed the reformist leadership of the party. Prominent members of the group were Augusto Kühn, Rodolfo Ghioldi, Victorio Codovilla, and the Chilean labour leader Luis Emilio Recabarren.
