= Gabriela Laperrière de Coni =

Argentine journalist

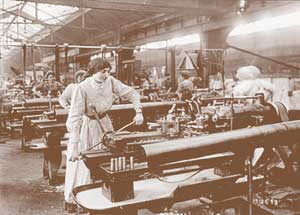
- Born: Gabriela Laperrière; 1866; Bordeaux, France
- Died: 8 January 1907 (aged 40–41)
- Political party: Argentine Socialist Party
- Spouse: Dr. Emilio Coni (m. 1899)
- Children: One son

Gabriela Laperrière de Coni (1866 – 8 January 1907) was an Argentine journalist, socialist, and public health activist. She founded the Feminist Socialist Center of the Argentine Socialist Party, and served on the executive committee of the party, the first woman to do so. She was a pioneering intellectual who devoted her energy to the cause of feminist issues related to working women in Argentina.

== Early life ==
She was born in Bordeaux, France in 1866. No further information is available about her early life, except that she wrote a novel on "woman's efforts to help sick children." At the age of 18, she married Dr. Emilio R. Coni, noted public-health physician from Buenos Aires who was actively engaged in immigration and health issues. She migrated to Argentina with him. His activity complimented her deep interests in the healthcare of women.

== Career ==
In the initial years, Gabriella was constantly exposed to a stream of visitors seeking help from Emilio, the Director of Public Assistance in Buenos Aires, all related to the health, accommodation, living conditions, destitute children and unemployment among both men and women. Unable to cope with the situation, the couple moved to Paris. In 1895 they returned to Argentina but her husband Emilio was laid for months due to a paralytic stroke. She then attended to the duties of her husband and helped people who came seeking their assistance. In 1901, the city government of Buenos Aires permitted Gabriella to study and report on the working conditions of women and children. During this assignment she toured the neighborhood extensively and was appalled by the inhumane living conditions, lack of hygiene, food and health facilities, poor nutrition, people living in abject poverty, lack of electricity and many more miseries.

After this assessment, she launched on many rehabilitation programmes such as providing food rations, set crèches at workplaces so that women workers could breastfeed their babies, and improved access to urban services and housing. She visited factories and reported on the harsh attitude of its owners in treating their employees which received public attention through her writings in newspapers. She made a four-part report of her findings and also mooted a proposal to enact labor laws which would bring about protection of women and children. This bill was enacted by the Parliament after her death in 1907.
