= Popular Socialist Party (Argentina) =

Political party in Argentina

Popular Socialist Party Partido Socialista Popular
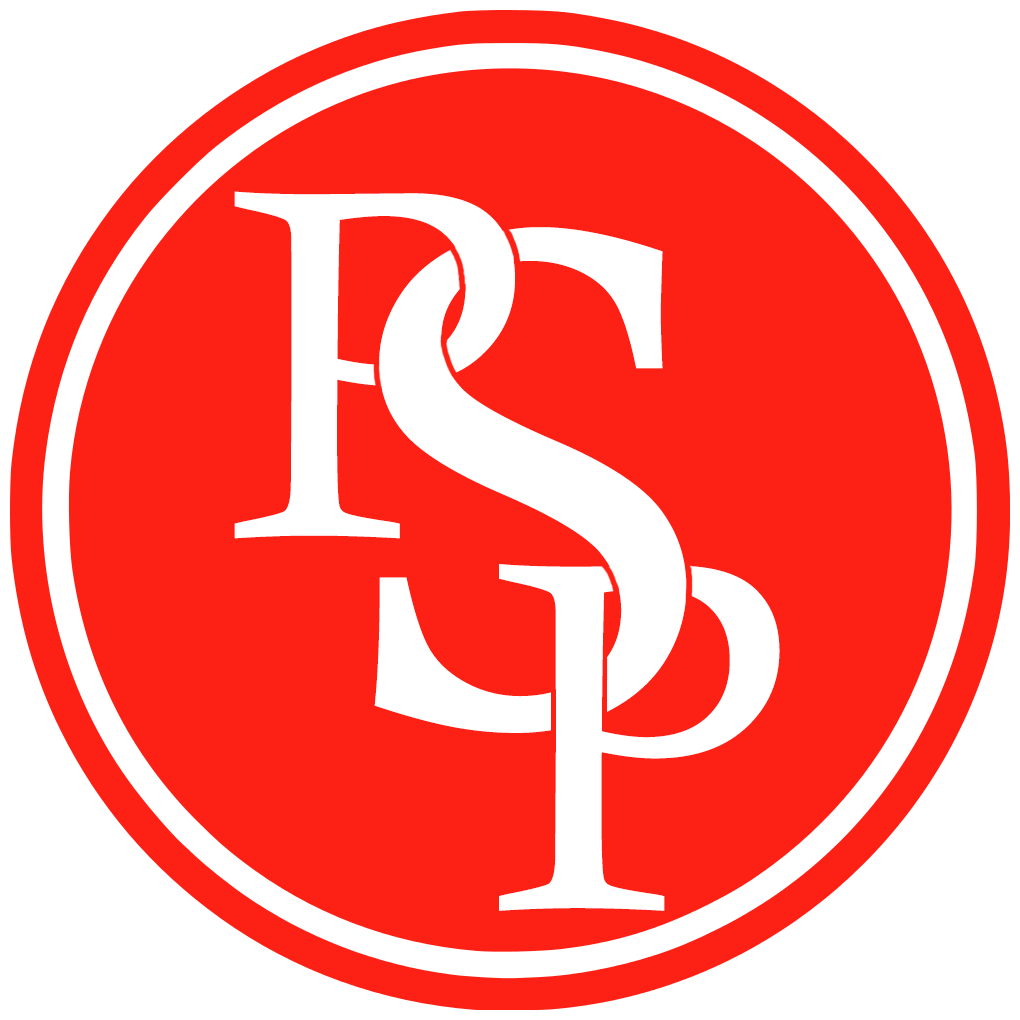
- Abbreviation: PSP
- Leader: Guillermo Estévez Boero (from 1972 to 2000); Rubén Giustiniani (from 2000 to 2002)
- Founded: 1972
- Dissolved: 2002
- Merger of: PSA; MAPA
- Merged into: PS
- Student wing: National Reformist Movement
- Youth wing: Socialist Youth of Argentina
- Ideology: Democratic socialism Reformism; Progressivism
- Political position: Left-wing
- Regional affiliation: COPPPAL; Latin American Socialist Coordination
- International affiliation: Socialist International
- Colors: Red

The Popular Socialist Party (Spanish: Partido Socialista Popular) was a political party in Argentina formed in 1972 with the merger of the Argentine Socialist Party, the Movimiento de Acción Popular Argentino (MAPA) and other minor groups.

Headed by the more radical left group of the Party, it became important in particular in the province of Santa Fe, where Guillermo Estévez Boero was elected deputy in 1987, resulting in being the first Socialist parliamentary since Alfredo Palacios' 1965 death. In 1989, the PSP won the second city of the country, Rosario, with the election of Héctor Cavallero (1989–1995), and again with the election of Hermes Binner in 1995 and 2002.

Although Cavallero turned to Carlos Menem and Justicialism, and then founded his own party, Binner became the first Socialist governor of Argentina following the 2007 general elections, being elected in the Province of Santa Fe.

The Movimiento Nacional Reformista (MNR, National Reformist Movement), which is the estudiantine branch of the PSP, has been one of the most representative estudiantine organization since the 1970s, having several times been represented at the presidency or general secretary of the Argentine University Federation (FUA) and of various local federations.

The PSP represented Argentina in the Socialist International and the Latin American Socialist Coordination. In 2002, it merged with the Democratic Socialist Party to form the Socialist Party.

== See also ==
- Politics of Argentina
- Socialist Party (Argentina)
