= José Montero Iglesias =

Spanish journalist and writer (1878–1920)

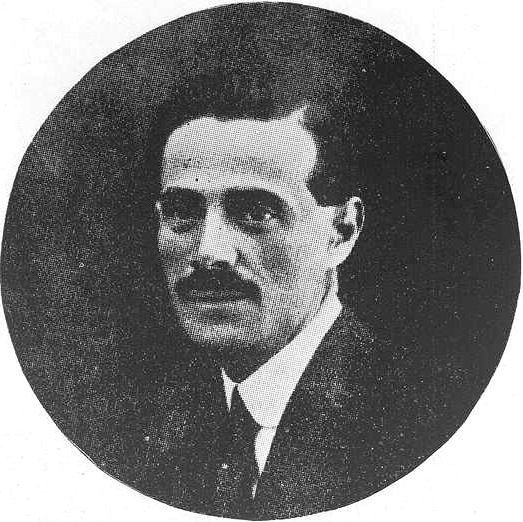

José Montero Iglesias (born in 1878 – died on July 20, 1920) was a Spanish writer and journalist.

== Biography ==
Jose Montero Iglesias was born in Ciudad Rodrigo, Salamanca, Spain and mostly lived in Santander and Madrid where he worked in newspapers and magazines. He was the director of the Cántabra Magazine and also collaborated in various newspapers and magazines such as La Atalaya, Letras Montañesas, El Diario Montañés, El Cantábrico, El Pueblo Cantabro. He was the father of José Montero Alonso, grandfather of José Montero Padilla.

== Death ==
He died of tuberculosis at the young age of 42 in a sanatorium in Guadarrama.

== Works ==
Notable Narrative works:

Soledad (Loneliness),

La sombra de Otelo (Othello's shadow),

Carne y mármol (Meat and marble),

Yelmo florido (Flowery Helm),

El Solitario de Proaño (The Solitaire of Proano).

Notable theater works:

El patio de Monipodio (The courtyard of Monipodio) in collaboration with Francisco Moya Rico and with music by maestro Villa.

Notable Biography works:
José María de Pereda;

Ángel Fernández de los Ríos;

Pedro Velarde

== Notes ==
- Anales del Instituto de Estudios Madrileños. Spain, Consejo Superior de Investigaciones Científicas., 2008.
- Studies in Spanish Literature in Honor of Daniel Eisenberg. United States, Juan de la Cuesta, 2009.
- Carrere, Emilio, and Montero Padilla, José. Antología. Spain, Castalia, 1999.
- Montero Reguera, José. Cervantismos de ayer y hoy: capítulos de historia cultural hispánica. Spain, Publicaciones de la Universidad de Alicante, 2011.
- La Esfera. Spain, n.p, 1930.
- Gaceta de Madrid. Spain, n.p, 1972.
- University of California Union Catalog of Monographs Cataloged by the Nine Campuses from 1963 Through 1967: Authors & titles. United States, Institute of Library Research, University of California, Berkeley, 1972.
