= Alicia Moreau de Justo =

Argentine politician (1885–1986)

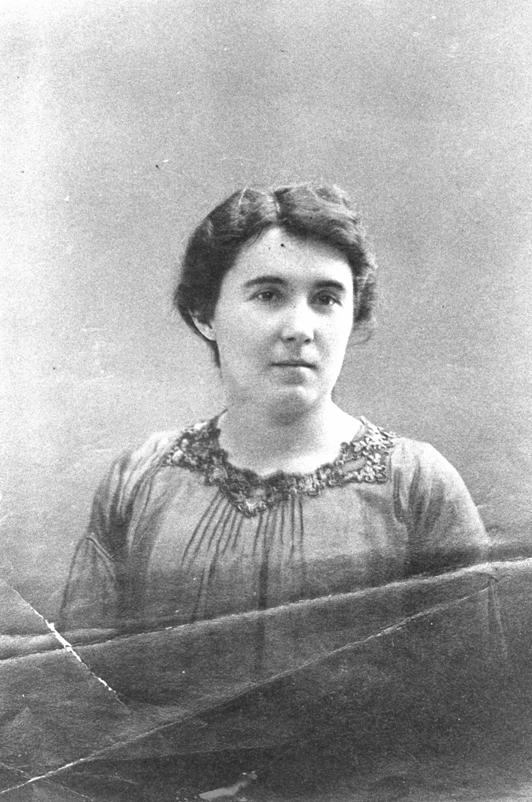
- Born: October 11, 1885; London, United Kingdom
- Died: 12 May 1986 (aged 100); Buenos Aires, Argentina
- Spouse: Juan Bautista Justo (from 1922 to 1928)
- Children: Alicia Marta, Juan Roberto and Luis Justo

Alicia Moreau de Justo (Spanish pronunciation: [aˈlisja moˈɾo ðe ˈxusto]; October 11, 1885 – May 12, 1986) was an Argentine physician, politician, pacifist and human rights activist. She was a leading figure in feminism and socialism in Argentina. Since the beginning of the 20th century, she got involved in public claims for opening rights for women. In 1902, joined by a fellow activists, she founded the Feminist Socialist Center and the Feminine Work Union of Argentina.

== Biography ==
Alicia Moreau de Justo was born in London, United Kingdom, on October 11, 1885, as the youngest of two sisters. Her father, Armando Moreau, fought for the Paris Commune in 1871. Following the Commune's defeat, he relocated to London, where he met his wife, María Denanpont, with whom he had Alicia. Later, the family moved to Argentina and Alicia enrolled at Escuela Normal 1 in Buenos Aires. She married Juan B. Justo in 1922. Her husband died on January 8, 1928, due to cardiac arrest.

Alicia Moreau de Justo was a women's rights activist who served in various roles such as teacher, doctor, and journalist. She sought to promote human rights and women's justice, with a specific focus on women's reproductive health and voting. Additionally, she pursued a medical degree to provide women with more opportunities to gain bodily autonomy. She successfully graduated from the University of Buenos Aires in 1914. Moreau applied her egalitarian political beliefs to her medical career. After graduating, she exclusively worked in working-class clinics. Darwinism was a main influence for Moreau and the choices she made. This ideology led to the creation of the National Feminist Union and the Socialist Women's Suffrage Committee.

Charles Darwin was one of Moreau's early influences. Darwin's writing inspired Moreau to attend medical school. Darwinism, inspired Moreau's progressive political beliefs. Moreau believed in Progressive Evolution: the idea that society could gradually change to become more equitable.

She organized conferences in the Fundación Luz (Light Foundation), and together with her father, co-founded the Ateneo Popular (the People's Athenaeum). She was chief editor of the journal Humanidad Nueva (New Humanity), and director of the publication Nuestra Causa (Our Cause). In 1914 she graduated from university as a medical doctor, and some years later, she joined the Socialist Party. Shortly after that, she married the leader of the Argentinean Socialist Party, Juan B. Justo, and together they had three children.

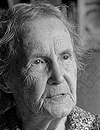
Alicia Moreau de Justo in 1972.

By 1918, she had founded the Unión Feminista Nacional (National Feminist Union). After her husband died in 1928, she continued her political activity fighting for women's rights; including women's suffrage, employment rights, public health and public education. In 1932, she drafted a bill to establish women's suffrage, which was not sanctioned until 1947 in Argentina. She supported the Second Spanish Republic during the Spanish Civil War and was a regular critic of Peronism, which she viewed as antidemocratic. In 1958, she took part in the founding of the Argentinean Socialist Party, accepting the director position of the newspaper La Vanguardia until 1960. She continued working until her final years, and helped found of the Permanent Assembly for Human Rights in 1975.

== Alicia Moreau de Justo's Political Life ==
The motives behind Alicia Moreau de Justo’s actions and the organizing of the Argentinean Socialist Party are aligned with the Argentinean government and its workings. Argentina's political landscape is shaped by both the ideas of Peronism and Marxism, expressing Argentina's values of tradition and socialist regimes. The Argentinean Socialist Party emerged in the political landscape hoping to mitigate women's discrimination and mistreatment in the more capitalist-centered society. Peronism benefited the Argentinean Socialist Party by helping organize more progressive agendas and advocate for women's rights and pluralism.

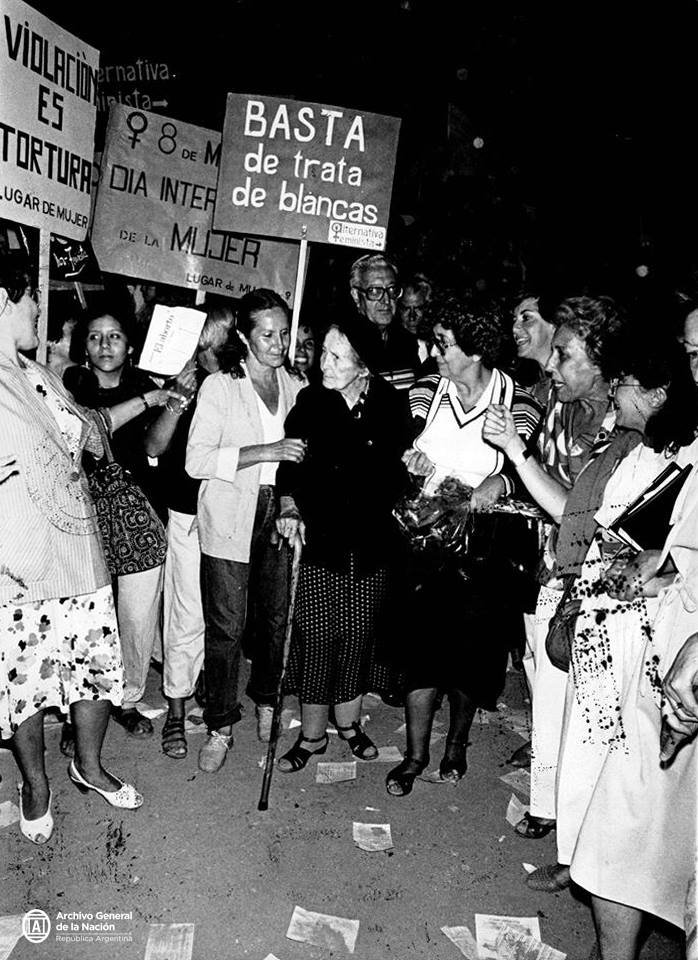
Image of Alicia Moreau de Justo from 1986

Justo's role in the party intertwines with her marriage to the leader of the Argentinean Socialist Party. Moreau was a leader of the socialist movement in Argentina. She actively participated in the Argentinean Socialist Party, and advocated for various causes, such as reproductive rights, equality in the workplace, and women's education.

Moreau's main focus and concerns center on women's education and literacy. Several restrictions from the government limited women in Argentina, such as the Civil Code, which restricted women and their rights in both the public and private spheres. Because of Moreau's involvement in the party, she focused on ending the restriction of the Civil Code to help women gain more autonomy and rights within the public sphere.

=== Anti-Peronist Stance ===
Moreau strongly opposed Argentinean president Juan Perón. Peron, a populist, was viewed as anti-democratic by the Argentinean Socialist Party. As a populist, some of Peron's views overlapped with Moreau's socialist cause. This overlap was a threat to the socialist movement. Peronism threatened to split support from voters who were sympathetic to the Argentinian Socialist Party.

Moreau took a controversial stand against Peron regarding women's suffrage. Peron supported passing a women's suffrage law. Moreau supported women's suffrage, however, the Argentinean Socialist Party did not want Peron's government to receive credit for passing women's suffrage. Peron had participated in the 1943 coup; Moreau worried that passing women's suffrage would give Peron's government undeserved legitimacy.

Juan Perón's wife, Eva Duarte ("Evita"), played a key role in the president's attempt to gain support from women. In 1951, Evita founded the Peronist Women's Party (PPF). Like Moreau, the PPF advocated for women's rights. However, Moreau opposed the PPF. Moreau opposed any attempt by the Peron government to strengthen its legitimacy by gaining women supporters. Furthermore, Moreau rejected the notion that any issues only impacted women. Moreau argued the fighting for women's rights must be viewed in the larger context of the fight for equality and socialism.

In the end Moreau's opposition to the PPF was unsuccessful. In the 1951 presidential election, Peron won re-election, swaying 63% of women voters. Peron won more support from women than men.

=== The Argentine Feminist Union ===
She co-founded the National Feminist Union in Argentina, which aimed to unite different feminist organizations that existed in Argentina during that time. Some of these were: the Feminist Socialist Center, the Feminine Socialist Gathering and the National Council of Women. NFU's political action provided invaluable support for sanctioning of many laws recognizing women's rights and the protection of women's work. NFU also helped defend single mothers. This organization published the monthly magazine Nuestra Causa, to promote their ideas and organize women activists during electoral rallies, as well as massive petitions to the Legislative Power.
