= Tío Pujio =

- Village
- Location within Córdoba Province Location within Argentina
- Coordinates: 32°17′11″S 63°21′16″W
- Country: Argentina
- Province: Córdoba
- Department: General San Martín

Government
  - Intendant: Ariel Petrocchi
- Elevation: 229 m (751 ft)

Population (2010)
  - Total: 2,655
- Time zone: UTC−3 (ART)

Tío Pujio is a village located in the General San Martín Department in the Province of Córdoba in central Argentina.
