= Guillermo Estévez Boero =

Argentine politician (1930–2000)

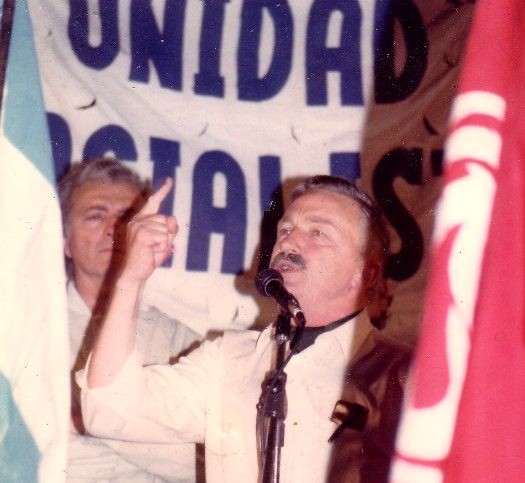
Guillermo Estévez Boero in 1987

Guillermo Estévez Boero (28 December 1930 – 3 February 2000) was an Argentine student activist, lawyer and Socialist politician.

Estévez Boero was born in Rosario, Santa Fe Province, and studied law at the National University of the Littoral, where he was a disciple of the Spanish criminal expert and President in exile of the Second Spanish Republic Luis Jiménez de Asúa. In 1952–1953 he presided the Students' Center. In 1958 he organized a massive demonstration of workers and students against the privatization of universities, and the next year he was elected president of the Argentine University Federation (FUA).

== Early political career ==
Estévez Boero was a staunch supporter of the University Reform movement initiated in 1918, and in 1960 he founded the National Reformist Movement (MNR), a Socialist university movement which is acknowledged as one of the most representative organizations of Argentina's student activist movements.

In 1971 he wrote Realidad Política Argentina (RPA), where he maintains that the two largest and politically most important parties of Argentina, the Radical Civic Union and the Justicialist Party (Peronism) are popular movements opposed to the local and foreign economic elites, and that the cycle of democratic governments followed by coups d'état that had become commonplace in Argentina could only be stopped by an agreement between Peronists, Radicals and progressive political forces that gave rise to a stable democracy founded on an economic system of "national liberation". RPA had a profound influence among the political leaders that arose in the 1970s and achieved the goal of a stable democracy from 1983 on.

In 1972 Estévez Boero founded the Popular Socialist Party (PSP), aiming to build a Socialist political organization that was not opposed to Radicalism and Peronism.

== The dictatorship ==
A coup d'état ousted President Isabel Perón in 1976, and started a military dictatorship, whose leaders styled it "National Reorganization Process". Estévez Boero opposed the military juntas and kept the PSP active despite the ban on political activity commanded by the de facto government and enforced using brutal repression and state terrorism. He denounced the widespread violation of human rights in Argentina at international forums such as the Socialist International.

The PSP took part in union- and student-led resistance against the dictatorship, such as the general strike called by the "Brasil" faction of the General Confederation of Labour in 1979, the 1981 Saint Cajetan's Day demonstration, and the demonstration of 30 March 1982 organized by the "Brasil" faction of the General Confederation of Labour .

== Return to democracy ==
After the defeat of Argentina in the Falklands War, and facing an economic crisis, the leaders of the dictatorship called for elections in 1983. Estévez Boero ran for president representing the PSP. The Radical Raúl Alfonsín was elected. Estévez Boero was chosen to represent Santa Fe in the national Chamber of Deputies in 1987, thus becoming the first Socialist legislator since the death of Alfredo Palacios in 1965. He was reelected in 1991, 1995 and 1999.

In the meantime, Estévez Boero ran again for president in 1989. President Alfonsín was succeeded (amid an economic crisis which included food riots in Rosario) by the Justicialist Carlos Menem.

While still a Deputy, he was also elected member of the Assembly that dealt with the 1994 reform of the Argentine Constitution, and he played a major role in the crafting of the border treaty between Argentina and Chile of 1998, which dealt with the division of the Southern Patagonian Ice Field.

Around this time he was diagnosed with leukemia. He endured a harsh treatment and a successful surgery in October 1999. In January 2000, disregarding medical counsel, he traveled to Chile to attend the inauguration of President Ricardo Lagos, the first Chilean Socialist president after the death of his friend Salvador Allende. Still immunologically weak, he contracted acute pneumonia and could not recover.

He died in Buenos Aires on 3 February. His funeral was conducted at the National Congress and attended by leaders of the whole political spectrum, including President Fernando de la Rúa. Vice-president Carlos Álvarez said in his speech:

"One of our best men is gone from us, just at a time when we needed him most to revert the loss of prestige that afflicts the political class. Estévez Boero embraced politics with a passion, not to fulfill personal ambitions or to augment his wealth, but to realize the ideal he had assumed since he was very young: making a great country, which may provide opportunities to live with dignity."

The remains were then sent by airplane to Rosario, where his wife and sons, along with other political leaders and surrounded by a crowd, had him buried in the family's mausoleum at the Saviour's Cemetery. His son, Enrique Estévez, made a career in politics in the Socialist Party and was elected to the Argentine Chamber of Deputies in 2019.
