= Juan B. Justo =

Argentine politician (1865–1928)

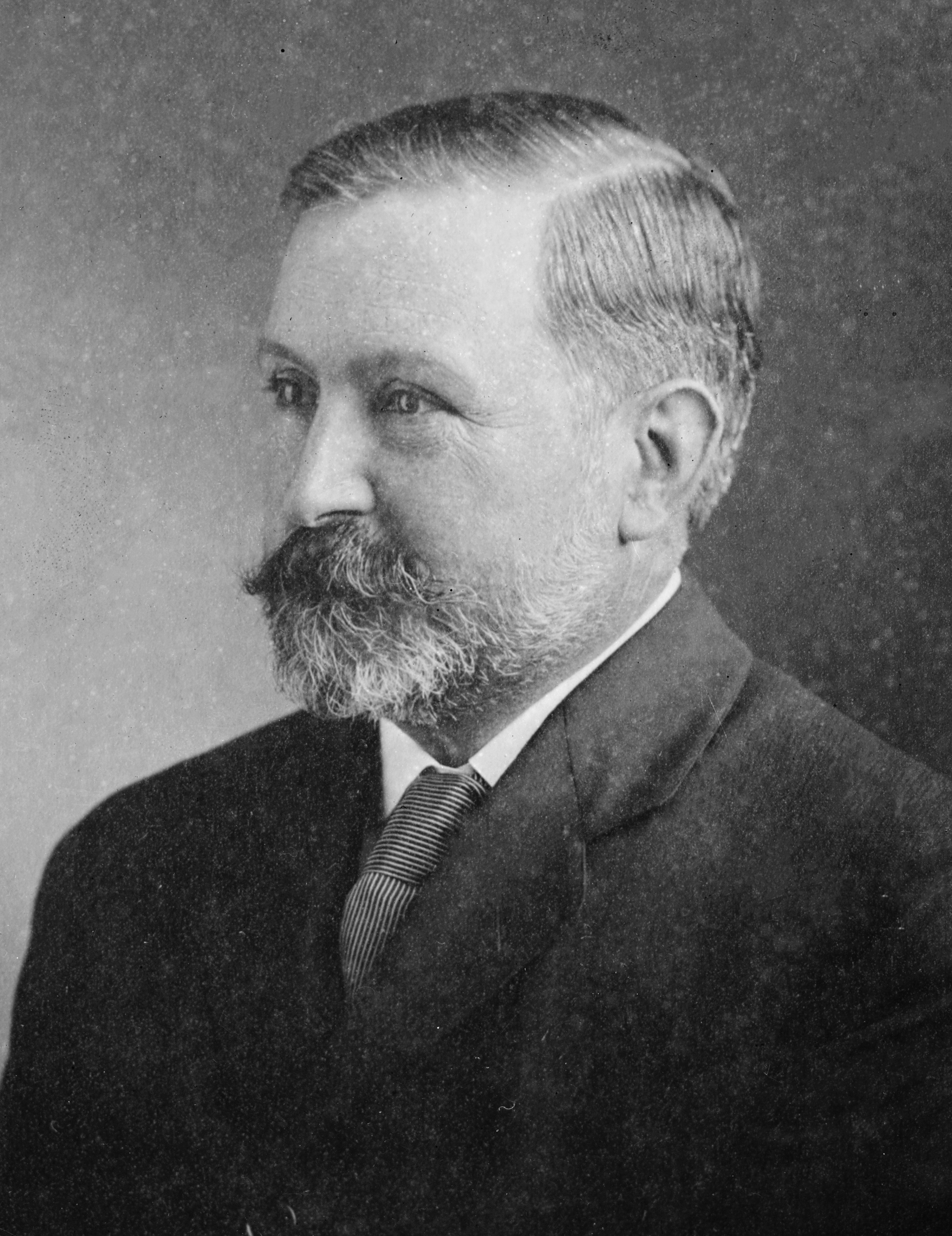
- Justo c. 1916

Senator for Buenos Aires
- In office 12 October 1924 – 8 January 1928

Chamber of Deputies for Buenos Aires
- In office 12 October 1912 – 12 October 1924

Personal details
- Born: Juan Bautista Justo; 28 June 1865 Buenos Aires, Argentina
- Died: 8 January 1928 (aged 62) Los Cardales, Exaltación de la Cruz Partido, Buenos Aires Province, Argentina
- Party: Civic Union of the Youth (1889–1890); Civic Union (1890–1891); Socialist Party (1896–1928)
- Spouse(s): Mariana Chertkoff (died 1912) Alicia Moreau de Justo
- Children: 9
- Relatives: Fenia Chertkoff (sister-in-law)
- Education: University of Buenos Aires, 1888
- Profession: Physician; journalist; writer

Juan Bautista Justo (28 June 1865 – 8 January 1928), known as Juan B. Justo, was an Argentine physician, journalist, politician, and writer. A freemason, like most Argentine socialists, after finishing medical school he joined the Civic Union of the Youth, Justo later participating in the foundation of the Socialist Party in 1896, of which he was chief director until his death.

== The physician ==
Justo studied medicine at the University of Buenos Aires while working as a journalist to earn a living. He graduated with honors in 1888, after which he travelled to Europe where he learned about socialist ideas. Back in Argentina, he worked as a surgeon at the Hospital de Crónicos.

== The journalist ==
Justo wrote his first pieces at the La Prensa newspaper as a parliamentary journalist. At the beginning of 1890 he started writing for the socialist newspaper El Obrero. In 1894, together with Augusto Kühn and Esteban Jiménez he founded the La Vanguardia publication that became two years later, with the creation of the Socialist Party, the official organ of the party. In 1905 La Vanguardia became a daily newspaper, in an important cultural extension that exceeded its original purpose of political diffusion. Justo directed the newspaper until his death.

== The politician ==
Juan B. Justo participated in the UCR from its beginnings as Unión Cívica in 1889. During the Park Revolution of 1890 he took care of the revolutionary wounded. Shortly after, Justo deepened its participation in workers' circles and socialist currents, to finally found the Socialist Party in 1896 with Estéban Jiménez, Augusto Kühn and Isidoro Salomó. He directed the party from its creation to his death in 1928.

In 1912 Justo was elected a national deputy, seat that he kept until 1924 when he was elected senator, in both cases representing the city of Buenos Aires. As a deputy he was chief of the commission that investigated the trusts conflict, and participated of the deliberations that led to the University Reform of 1918. Justo also proposed several projects of law for the social welfare, and against gambling, alcoholism and illiteracy.

Justo also participated of the creation of cooperative El Hogar Obrero, the Biblioteca Obrera and the Sociedad Luz of culture and promotion of socialism. As president of the Argentine Socialist Party, he assisted to the socialist congresses held in Copenhagen and Bern.

== The writer ==
Justo focused on political and social essays. His most important work is considered Theory and Practice of History (Teoría y práctica de la historia) of 1909. He also wrote Scientific Theory of History (Teoría científica de la historia) in 1898, Argentine Socialism (El socialismo argentino) in 1910, Socialism and Imperialism (Socialismo e imperialismo), The Socialist International (La internacional socialista), The Socialist Program for Agriculture (El programa socialista en el campo), and the posthumously published The Currency (La moneda) of 1937 and The Free Cooperation (La cooperación libre) of 1938. Justo also made the first Spanish translation from German of Karl Marx's Das Kapital.

== Personal life ==
Justo was married to Mariana Chertkoff (1876–1912), the sister of Fenia Chertkoff. Justo and Chertkoff had six children.

Justo later married Alicia Moreau de Justo, with whom he had three children.
