= Democratic Socialist Party (Argentina) =

Political party in Argentina

Democratic Socialist Party Partido Socialista Democratico
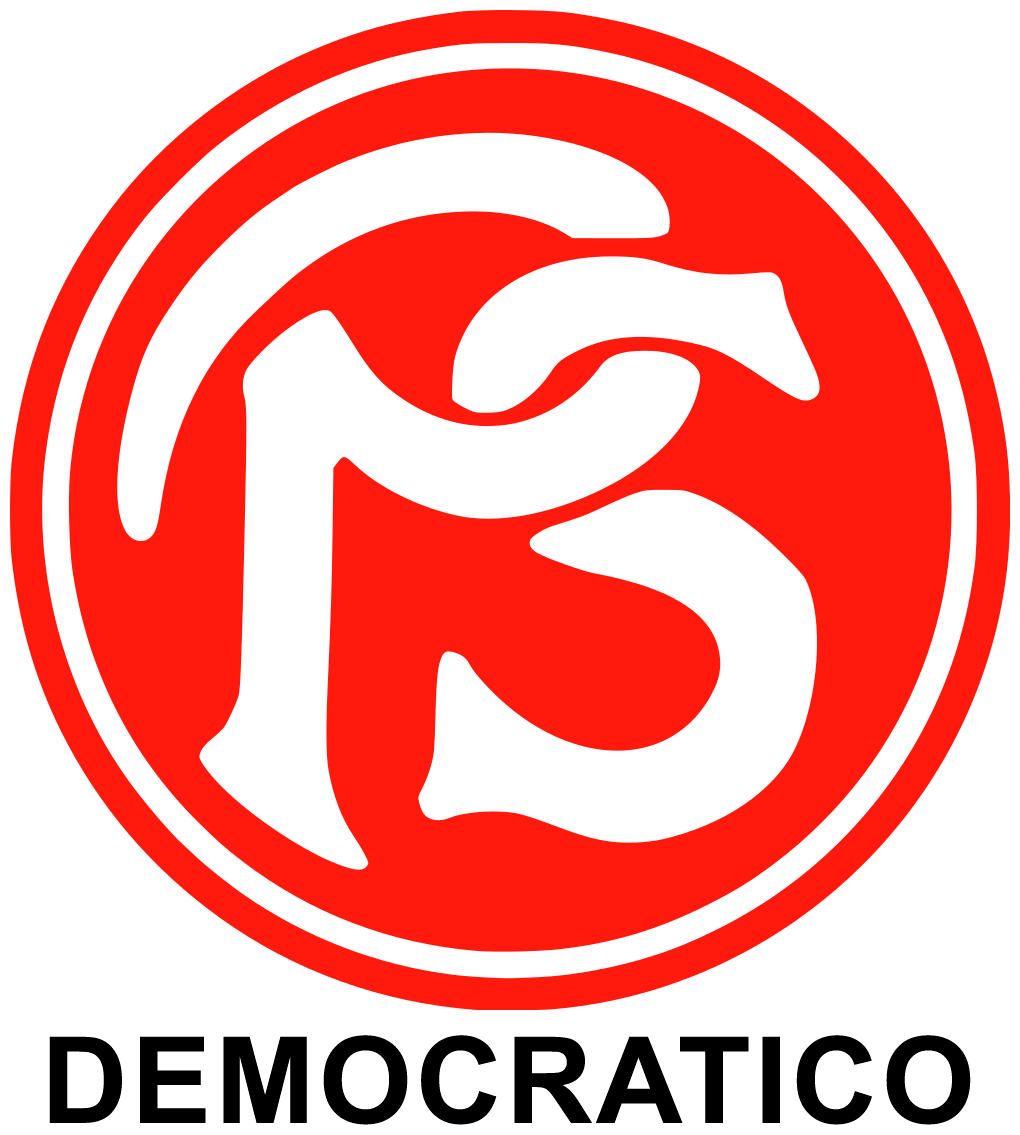
- Abbreviation: PSD
- Leader: Américo Ghioldi (from 1959 to 1984); Alfredo Bravo (from 1988 to 2002)
- Founded: 1959
- Dissolved: 2002
- Split from: Socialist Party
- Succeeded by: Socialist Party
- Ideology: From 1959 to 1988: Social democracy Anti-Peronism; From 1988 to 2002: Social democracy Progressivism
- Political position: From 1959 to 1988: Center to centre-left From 1988 to 2002: Centre-left
- Colors: Red

The Democratic Socialist Party (Spanish: Partido Socialista Democrático) was a political party in Argentina formed in 1959 as a division of the Socialist Party.

The most important figure of the PSD was Alfredo Bravo, a teacher and civil rights activist, which was a deputy and the presidential candidate of the Socialist Party in the 2003 election.

The party joined the Popular Socialist Party in 2002 to form the Socialist Party.

== See also ==
- Politics of Argentina
- Socialist Party (Argentina)
