= Socialist Party (Argentina) =

Political party in Argentina

Socialist Party Partido Socialista
- Abbreviation: PS
- Leader: Mónica Fein
- Deputy Secretary General: Enrique Estévez Boero
- Founder: Juan B. Justo
- Founded: Current: 28 June 2002; Original: 28 June 1896
- Merger of: PSD; PSP
- Headquarters: Av/ Entre Ríos, 1018, Buenos Aires
- Newspaper: La Vanguardia
- Student wing: National Reformist Movement
- Youth wing: Socialist Youth of Argentina
- Membership (2022): ▼106,880
- Ideology: Social democracy; Democratic socialism; Reformism; Progressivism Initially until 1959: Marxism
- Political position: Centre-left; Initially until 1959: Left-wing
- National affiliation: Hacemos por Nuestro País; Formally: Federal Consensus
- Regional affiliation: COPPPAL; São Paulo Forum; Latin American Socialist Coordination
- International affiliation: Progressive Alliance
- Colors: Red (official); Orange (customary)
- Seats in the Chamber of Deputies: 2 / 257
- Seats in the Senate: 0 / 72
- Seats in the Buenos Aires City Legislature: 1 / 60
- Province Governors: 0 / 24

Party flag
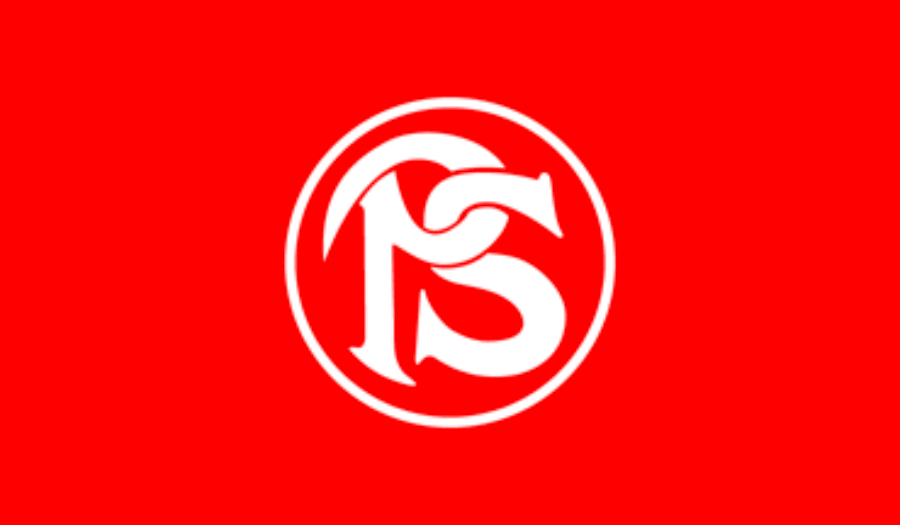

Website
- www.partidosocialista.org.ar

The Socialist Party (Spanish: Partido Socialista, PS) is a centre-left political party in Argentina. Founded in 1896, it is one of the oldest still-active parties in Argentina, alongside the Radical Civic Union.

The party has been an opponent of Kirchnerism and Mauricio Macri.

== History ==
=== Early history ===
The history of socialism in Argentina began in the 1890s, when a group of people, notably Juan B. Justo, expressed the need for a greater social focus. The PS itself was founded in 1896, led by Justo and Nicolás Repetto, thus becoming the first mass party in the country. The party affiliated itself with the Second International. Between 1924 and 1940 it was a member of the Labour and Socialist International.

Through its life, the party suffered from various splits: the International Socialist Party (which became the Communist Party of Argentina) and the Independent Socialist Party were the most notable. The most important of those was in the 1960s, when the party divided itself in half, giving birth to the more radical Argentine Socialist Party (Partido Socialista Argentino, PSA), and the more moderate Democratic Socialist Party (Partido Socialista Democrático, PSD). In 1966, two factions departed the PSA: Vanguardia Comunista and Partido Socialista de Vanguardia. In 1972, the remaining of the PSA together with other leftist groups formed the Popular Socialist Party (Partido Socialista Popular, PSP). The PSP and PSD were rejoined in 2002, forming the Socialist Party.

Badge of the original Socialist Party, still used today.

Among the socialist leaders of Argentina, the most remarkable are Alfredo Palacios, who was the first socialist parliamentarian in the Americas (1904) and a Senator in the 1960s; Juan B. Justo, doctor, philosopher, writer and leader of the party until his death in 1928; Alicia Moreau de Justo (1895–1986), Justo's wife, who was for years the editor of the Socialist newspaper La Vanguardia; Guillermo Estévez Boero, founder of the Popular Socialist Party; and Alfredo Bravo, a teacher, unionist, human rights militant and respected legislator in the last two decades of the 20th century (died 2003).

The Socialist Party of Argentina maintains an electoral stronghold in the province of Santa Fe, and particularly in Rosario, where mayors have been socialists since 1989. Former two-term mayor Hermes Binner slowly became acknowledged as a reference character for the party. In the 2005 parliamentary elections a Socialist-Radical alliance led by Binner won 5 seats in the national Lower House, and in the elections of 2007, Binner, leading a broad, centre-leftist political coalition (the Progressive, Civic and Social Front), became the first Socialist to be elected governor of an Argentine province.

=== Present day ===
In the 2011 general election, Binner was the Socialist candidate and achieved 2nd place with 16.8% of votes. Despite this number being well below the 54.1% achieved by Peronist leader Cristina Fernández de Kirchner, the Socialist Party considered the results of the election as significant and a sign of renewed interest by a sector of the population. In May 2012, Binner became the Socialist Party's president.

For the 2015 general election, the PS entered in coalition with other centre-left and left-wing parties to form the Progresistas (Progressives) front, which endorsed Margarita Stolbizer for the presidency. Stolbizer landed 5th in the election with just over 2.5% of the vote, failing to pass the threshold for the run-off. During the same elections, Socialist Miguel Lifschitz was elected Governor of Santa Fe, succeeding Antonio Bonfatti (also of the PS).

In April 2016, Bonfatti was chosen to succeed Binner as national president of the party. Following the 2017 legislative election, the party was left with a single national deputy, Luis Contigiani, and no representatives in the Senate. In 2018, Contigiani left the Socialist Party's bloc in the Chamber of Deputies after being criticized by his party for refusing to vote in favor of a bill that would legalize abortion in the country.

In the 2019 general election, PS didn't elect any deputies; however, Socialist politician Enrique Estévez was elected to the Chamber of Deputies on the list of the Progressive, Civic and Social Front, and thus the Socialist Party regained its representation in the Congress.

In 2021, former intendente (mayor) of Rosario, Mónica Fein, was elected president of the Socialist Party.

== Electoral performance ==
=== President ===
Election year	Candidate	Coalition	1st round	
Election year	Candidate	Coalition	# of overall votes	% of overall vote
1916	Juan B. Justo	—N/a	52.215 (4th)	7.25 (lost)
1922	Nicolás Repetto	—N/a	54.813 (4th)	6.61 (lost)
1928	Mario Bravo	—N/a	65.660 (3rd)	4.83 (lost)
1931	Lisandro de la Torre	Civil Alliance	436.125 (2nd)	31.04 (lost)
1937	Nicolás Repetto	—N/a	50.917 (3rd)	2.59 (lost)
1946	José Tamborini	Democratic Union	1.207.080 (2nd)	42.87 (lost)
1951	Alfredo Palacios	—N/a	54,920 (5th)	0.7 (lost)
1958	Alfredo Palacios	—N/a	264,721 (4th)	3.22 (lost)
1963	Alfredo Palacios (PSA)	—N/a	278,856 (6th)	3.64 (lost)
1963	Alfredo Orgaz (PSD)	—N/a	258,787 (7th)	3.38 (lost)
March 1973	Américo Ghioldi (PSD)	—N/a	109,068 (7th)	0.92 (lost)
1983	Rafael Martínez Raymonda	Democrat-Socialist Alliance (PDP-PSD)	50.184 (9th)	0,34 (lost)
1983	Guillermo Estévez Boero (PSP)	—N/a	21.177 (13th)	0.14 (lost)
1989	Guillermo Estévez Boero (PSP)	Socialist Unity (PSP-PSD)	240,132 (7th)	1.43 (lost)
1995	José Octavio Bordón	FREPASO	5,096,104 (2nd)	29.30 (lost)
1999	Fernando de la Rúa	Alliance	9,167,220 (1st)	48.37 (win)
2003	Alfredo Bravo	—N/a	217,385 (8th)	1.12 (lost)
2007	Elisa Carrió	Civic Coalition	4,401,981 (2nd)	23.04 (lost)
2011	Hermes Binner	FAP	3,684,970 (2nd)	16.81 (lost)
2015	Margarita Stolbizer	Progresistas	632,551 (5th)	2.51 (lost)
2019	Roberto Lavagna	Federal Consensus	1,649,315 (3rd)	6.14 (lost)
2023	Juan Schiaretti	Hacemos por Nuestro País	1,802,068 (4th)	6.73 (lost)

== See also ==
- Comité de Propaganda Gremial
- Centro de Estudios Carlos Marx
