= Alfredo Palacios =

Argentine politician

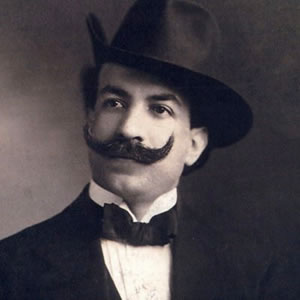
- Palacios, c. 1910.

National Senator
- In office 1 May 1958 – 29 March 1962
- Constituency: City of Buenos Aires

National Deputy
- In office 13 October 1963 – 20 April 1965
- Constituency: City of Buenos Aires
- In office May 1935 – 4 June 1943
- Constituency: 4th Circunscription

Personal details
- Born: Alfredo Lorenzo Palacios; 10 August 1878 Buenos Aires, Argentina
- Died: 30 April 1965 (aged 86) Buenos Aires, Argentina
- Party: Socialist Party
- Profession: Lawyer

Alfredo Lorenzo Palacios (August 10, 1878 – April 20, 1965) was an Argentine socialist politician.

Palacios was born in Buenos Aires, and studied law at University of Buenos Aires, after graduation he became a lawyer and taught at the university until becoming a dean.

In 1902, he was elected to the Buenos Aires' legislature, and in 1904, to the Chamber of Deputies for the 4th Circunscription of Buenos Aires, which corresponded to the barrio of La Boca, thus becoming the first socialist in the Argentine Congress and in the American continent. Palacios helped create many laws including the "Palacios Law" (Ley Palacios) against sexual exploitation, and others regulating child and women labor, working hours and Sunday rest.

Palacios was elected Senator in 1932, serving until the Senate was dissolved in 1943, and in 1955 was appointed ambassador to Uruguay. In 1960, Palacios was elected again as Senator, and as Deputy in 1963.
