= Feminism in Argentina =

Feminism in Argentina is a set of movements aimed at defining, establishing, and defending equal political, economic, and social rights and equal opportunities for women in Argentina. Although some women have been considered precursors—among them Juana Manso and Juana Manuela Gorriti—feminism was introduced to the country as a result of the great European immigration wave that took place in the late 19th and early 20th century. The first feminists did not form a unified movement, but included anarchist and socialist activists, who incorporated women's issues into their revolutionary program, and prestigious freethinker women, who initially fought for access to higher education and, later, legal equality with men. The early 20th century was also full of women fighting for their freedom and rights in the workplace. Despite the efforts of the first-wave feminists, Argentine women did not acquire the right to vote until 1947, during Juan Perón's first government. His highly popular wife, Eva, championed women's suffrage and founded and ran the nation's first large-scale female political party, the Female Peronist Party. Although she refused to identify herself as a feminist, Eva Perón is valued for having redefined the role of women in politics.

The convulsive period between the late 1960s and mid-1970s was one of intense social transformations and political activism. Among the feminist organization that appeared were the Unión Feminista Argentina (UFA; English: Argentine Feminist Union) and the Movimiento de Liberación Feminista (MLF; English: Feminist Liberation Movement).

== History ==
=== Precursors ===
"Prospectus" of the first issue of Petrona Rosende de Sierra's La Aljaba, edited on November 12, 1830, and "dedicated to the Argentine fair sex".

Between 12 November 1830, and 14 January 1831—during the first government of Juan Manuel de Rosas—Uruguayan-born journalist Petrona Rosende de Sierra published what is considered to be the first Argentine publication written by and for women: La Aljaba (English: The Quiver). In addition to art, literature and friendship, the newspaper dealt with topics such as the intellectual formation of women, their role in society and their position in relation to men. Rosende de Sierra advocated the adoption of European educational theories, claiming that the government should provide primary and secondary education to women, who must have faith in their own capacity and prove their ability to overcome the resistance to female education. In one of the issues, the writer questioned her readers: "Until when the female sex will be seen plunged into the darkness in which it was locked by the oppressive system of those who denied the simplest knowledges?" Another periodical that argued for women's right to education was La Camelia (English: The Camellia), edited in 1852 by Rosa Guerra, the principal of a small private girls' school in Buenos Aires. Unlike Rosende de Sierra twenty years earlier, Guerra "believed that women did not need to prove themselves worthy of education, but had a moral and legal right to it"; she presented it as the solution of women's problems. At the same time, La Camelia warned that women "must not lose their feminine modesty" and avoid coming across as intellectuals as it "could be equated with loose morality." During its brief life, the publication also supported dress reform, claiming women dressed as "ornamental dolls". Dress reform was a controversial issue at the time, and despite her emphasis on the importance of modesty in dress, Guerra was harshly criticised by influential Catholic women and the Church. In 1854, Guerra started another publication called La Educación (English: The Education) similar in format to La Camelia. She was a prolific writer who also produced novels, children's books and articles and poetry for the daily newspapers. Despite her liberal politics, Guerra did not depart from the notion of "citizen-training mother" as the main role of women. She believed women were born to suffer for love, with female self-sacrifice being a constant theme in her work. This "romantic concept of womanly martyrdom" was a dominant theme in Argentine women's literature of the mid-19th century, which exalted female virtues at the expense of men's selfishness.

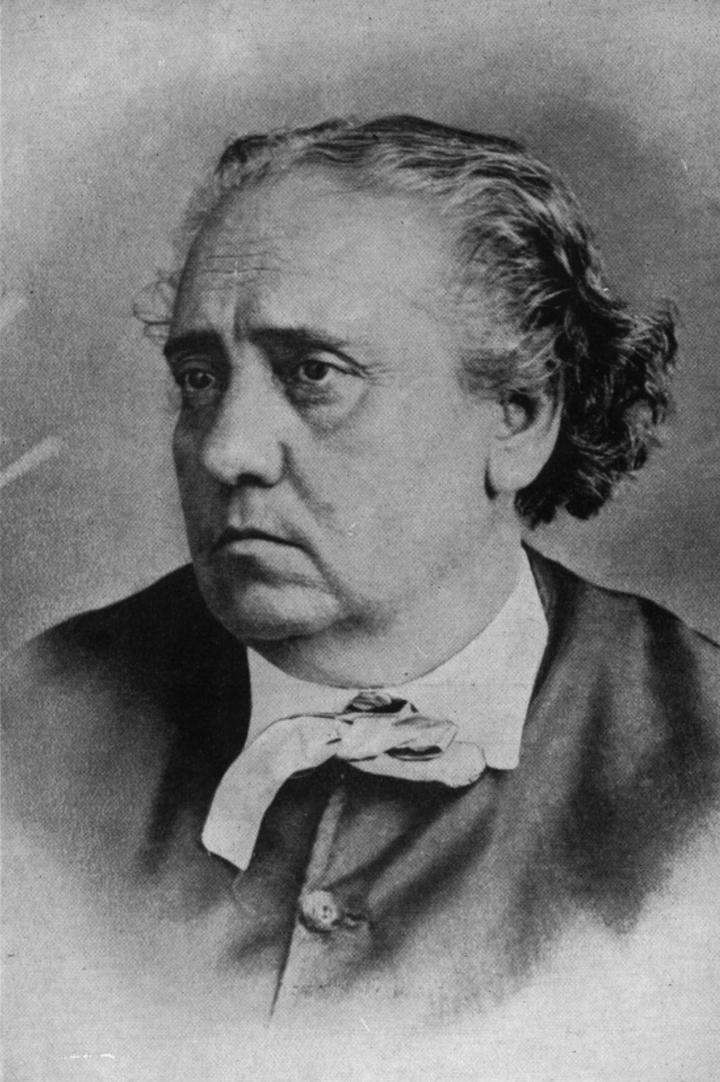
Juana Manso, regarded as a pioneer of feminism in South America.

Born in Buenos Aires on 26 June 1819, Juana Manso was a writer, translator, journalist, teacher and precursor of feminism in South America. In fact, she is considered by many as the first feminist of Argentina. Manso lived in Rio de Janeiro from 1849 to 1853, where she published The Women's Journal (Portuguese: O Jornal das Senhoras), a periodical modeled on an English magazine of the same name that, "argued against discrimination against women and supported equal education for Latin American women." Back in Buenos Aires, she founded the Ladies' Album (Spanish: Álbum de Señoritas), with a very similar theme to the Brazilian journal. In her periodicals and novels, Manso advocated her ideas on equality of women, popular education and abolitionism, which were met with resistance by Argentine society, as it remained hostile to any manifestation that meant breaking ties with the colonial era. In an 1853 article titled "The Moral Emancipation of Women", published in the journal The Argentine Enlightenment (Spanish: La Ilustración Argentina), Manso wrote:

The moral emancipation of women is considered by vulgarity as the apocalypse of the century. Some run to the dictionary and exclaim: There is no parental authority! Goodbye marital despotism! To emancipate the woman! How! For that junk in the living room (or kitchen), that procreative machine, that golden zero, that frivolous toy, that doll of fashions, will it be a rational being? [...] How! Would she be one day equal to the man in sacred rights that brutality trampled until today without mercy? Unheard-of scandal! What could young people use to pretend the heart of beauties? How (say the stubborn) after treating women as our property we would have to recognize our equal in it! [...] There will come a day when the code of the peoples will guarantee women the rights of their freedom and their intelligence. Humanity can not be retrograde. [...] Her intelligence, cultivated, will improve the moral faculties and make her exercise the inevitable influence that nature gives her in the great destinies of humanity; yes; because the mission of the woman is serious and great.

=== First-wave ===
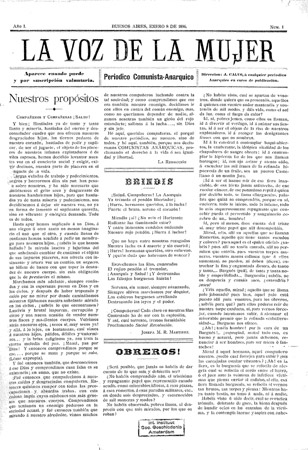
Front page of the first issue of anarcha-feminist newspaper La Voz de la Mujer, January 8, 1896.

Feminism in the country emerged at the end of the 19th century and the beginning of the 20th century, during the consolidation of the modern Argentine State. There was not a homogenous feminist movement, rather individual struggles carried out by women inserted in diverse political identities and different social classes. Women from the upper and upper middle class made important advances in the public space, although they did it fundamentally from the academic field. Working class women were organized under socialism and anarchism. A group of anarchist women headed by Virginia Bolten founded La Voz de la Mujer in 1896, the first feminist newspaper in Argentina. It defined itself as anarcho-communist and was released under the motto "No God, no master, no husband". As one of the first recorded instances in Latin America of the fusion of feminist ideas with a revolutionary and working class orientation, La Voz de la Mujer differed from the feminism found elsewhere in the region at that time, which focused on educated middle-class women and their concerns. By the end of the 19th century, these anarchists raised issues as free love, divorce and allegations of domestic violence, which would gain public prominence decades later.

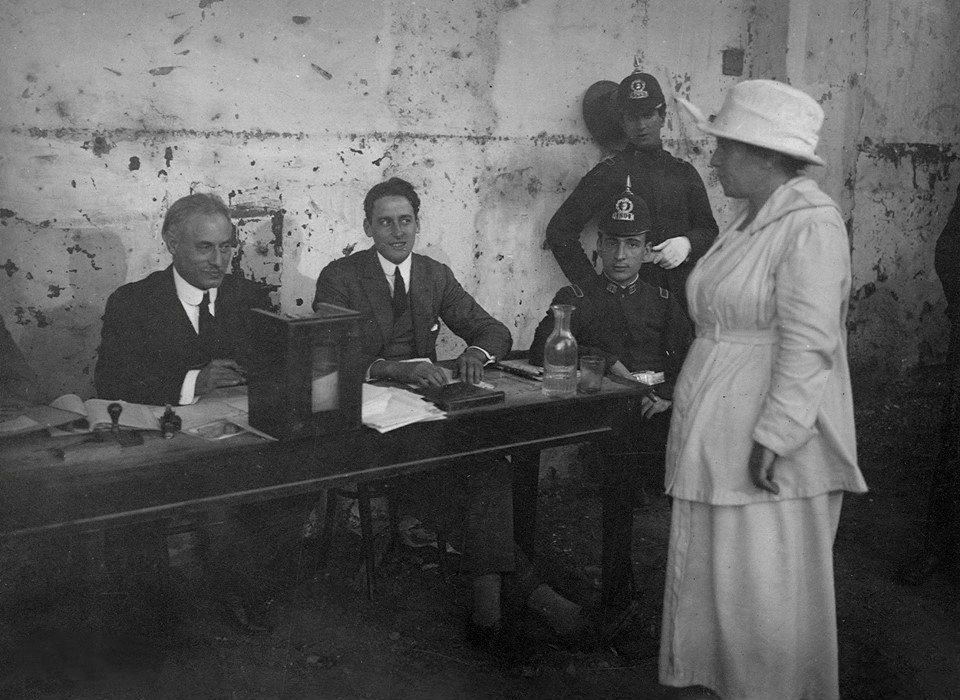
Feminist activist Julieta Lanteri becoming the first Latin American woman to vote in 1911.

From the turn of the century on, a different variant of feminism emerged, that of the Socialist Party, with women such as Cecilia Grierson, Alicia Moreau de Justo and Juana Rouco Buela; who "launched the struggle for equal rights, better educational opportunities, and reform of the civil code, and in so doing they radically redefined the politics, strategy, and terrain of feminist struggle." The first feminists of the country, both the reformists as well as the suffragettes and even those of more extreme positions, believed in a "maternal, morally superior, and pacifist feminine nature." Mayra Leciñana of Clarín wrote that "the theoretical alliances with socialism and the positivism of the moment enable a utopian bias that gives thickness to their demands and allows the production of new meanings for 'the new woman'." A "transcendental" figure in the history of Argentine feminism, Elvira López became one of the first women to graduate from the University of Buenos Aires' School of Philosophy and Philology. Her thesis, written in 1901 and titled "The feminist movement" (Spanish: "El movimiento feminista"), is considered a local landmark and meant the issue's entry into the Argentine academic field.

In 1904, Julieta Lanteri, Cecilia Grierson, Sara Justo, Elvira Rawson de Dellepiane and sisters Ernestina and Elvira López created the Asociación de Mujeres Universitarias Argentinas (English: Association of Argentine University Women), whose positions were identified with those of the so-called "moderate feminism". On the occasion of the Argentina Centennial of 1910 and on the initiative of Lanteri, this association organized the First International Women's Congress (Spanish: Primer Congreso Femenino Internacional) in order to bring the situation of women and their rights to public debate. The association was then chaired by Petrona Eyle, and the organizing committee for the Congress counted among its members with distinguished professionals and activists such as Lanteri, Justo, Grierson, Irma Vertúa, Ada María Elflein, Moreau de Justo, Fenia Chertkoff, doctors Leonor and María Teresa Martínez Bisso, among others.

On 16 February 1906, Rawson de Dellepiane founded the Feminist Center (Spanish: Centro Feminista) in Buenos Aires, joined by a group of prestigious women.

=== 1920s ===
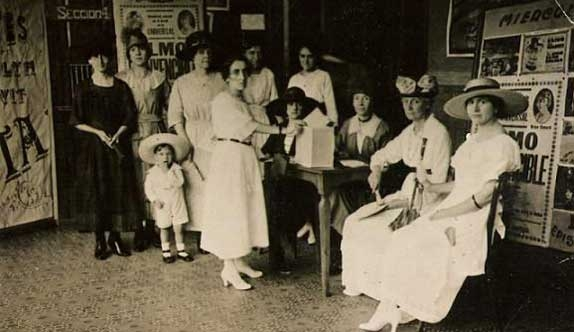
Women voting in 1920 in Buenos Aires as part of a mock election campaign carried out by feminist activists.

The feminist movement during the 1920s was especially relevant, as activists achieved greater organization, perseverance and scope of membership to push for the rights that women were getting in other countries. The end of World War I ushered in a new period of political restlessness among urban Argentines. The feasibility of female suffrage was reinforced by news of women's activities in the war and the debate that was taking place in the United States, the United Kingdom and France. In this context, the National Congress received several bills of women's suffrage in the decade, although all of them were shelved and disregarded. The constitution of Santa Fe Province of 1921 recognized the right of women to vote in municipal elections. In 1928, under a new constitution women from San Juan Province voted in provincial elections.

In 1920, the associations led by Moreau decided to carry out a mock election campaign in Buenos Aires simultaneously with the congressional elections that were taking place in March. The idea was inspired by French suffragists who had held a mock election in 1918 in Paris to "gauge public support for woman suffrage." The mock election for women was held through the cooperation of rival feminist groups, including the Comité Pro Sufragio Femenino, the Partido Feminista Nacional, the Unión Feminista Nacional and the Asociación Pro Derechos de la Mujer. While Dr. Moreau wanted a "well conducted, dignified campaign", Lanteri—who was running for office with the National Feminist Party—sought more exposure and received attention from the North American and South American press, as well as Buenos Aires newspapers. Since she worked with many women from the British community, the Buenos Aires Herald followed her campaign closely, dubbing her "the Pankhurst of Argentina". The mock election was attended by over 4,000 women, with the Socialist Party making the best showing, followed by Julieta Lanteri and the Radical Party. A second voting exercise was held in November to coincide with the municipal elections.

=== Working-class Argentine women ===
One of the main running themes of Argentine feminism has been the female industrial working class and their growth. The validity of the female working class of Argentina was something that most, if not all, Argentine feminists agreed on, therefore making them one of the bases of the Argentine feminist movement. Working class women were some of the first women in Argentina to fight against the men who wanted to limit them. Many of them did this by joining neighborhood associations and unions in order to fight for improved living and working conditions. These organizations made huge advancements in Argentine feminism as it showed that these women were not submissive and were going to fight for what they believed in.

==== The Twentieth Century in Relation to the Female Workforce ====
Women in Argentina were first sought out as workers around the 20th century because they were, essentially, the most expendable. A large part of the reason women were sent to work in factories and the like was because they were seen as calm, cheap, and trustworthy. This, along with women becoming more and more educated, helped shine a light on women and the issues they faced in both the workplace and in their daily lives.

As the fight for working class women grew throughout Argentina, Congress began to pass laws and regulations that specifically attended to the demands from female workers. While this was a great start, there were some flaws within these regulations. It seemed as if Congress was so focused on attending to the demands of female labor unions, they did not take the necessary time to consider what working women actually needed in the day-to-day workforce. Additionally, after these regulations were put into place, it was up to many women to be sure that the businesses that employed women were following these regulations, and many times there was cause for complaint upon investigation.

At the end of the 19th century and the start of the 20th, men outnumbered women in the workforce more than two times over. The only jobs that women outnumbered men in were those of domestic servants and teachers. Because women were outnumbered so badly, this led many people to believe this held restrictions against women, as the lack of job opportunities left them unfairly dependent on men. Additionally, the fact that there was such a large population of female domestic servants and teachers raised the issue of women in the workforce to feminists and reformers. This sudden interest caused the female workforce and feminist movement to grow. Throughout the 1890s, women began to pursue higher education which led to more women getting jobs like doctors. While the number of women in this profession was still small compared to the number of men, the fact that women were breaking into these industries made many of them want to help other women. Many of them experienced discrimination from men because of their gender, as many men believed that women were too emotional to be successful in these types of professions. Therefore, many of these women with higher paying jobs, along with upper class/wealthy women, created organizations such as the National Council of Women and the Socialist Women's Center in order to help working class women fight for their rights.

=== Peronist era ===
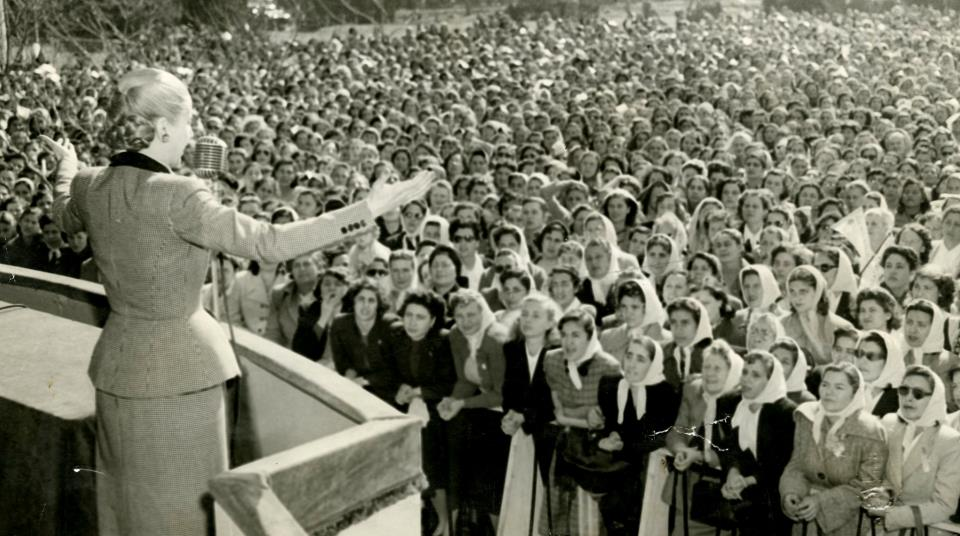
Eva Perón addressing a crowd of women on the occasion of the enactment of the women's suffrage law, September 1947.

While the figure of Eva Perón is highly valued by a portion of Argentine feminism, she did not consider herself a feminist and was highly critical of the women's movement that had preceded her. She shared her perspectives on feminism and the political role of women in her 1951 autobiography La razón de mi vida (released by Vantage Press as My mission in life in 1953). Perón dedicates a chapter entitled "From the sublime to the ridiculous" to criticize the feminist movement, claiming that they aspired to be men and consequently renounced their womanhood by imitating them. She wrote:

I confess I was a little afraid the day I found myself facing the possibility of starting on the "feminist" path.

What could I, a humble woman of the people, do where other women, more prepared than I, had categorically failed?

Be ridiculous? Join the nucleus of women with a grudge against woman and against man, as has happened to innumerable feminist leaders?

I was not an old maid, nor even ugly enough for such a post... which, from the time of the English sufraggettes down to today, generally belongs, almost exclusively, to women of this type... women whose first impulse undoubtedly had been to be like men. [...]

And if what the world requires is a woman's political and social movement... how little will the world gain if the women want to save it by imitating men!

Although Argentine historiography has traditionally focused on the actions of Eva Perón and the Partido Peronista Femenino, more contemporary investigations bring to light associations of women opposed to Peronism. One of the most important women's associations that appeared during the Peronist government was the Unión de Mujeres de la Argentina (UMA; English: "Women's Union of Argentina"), an arm of the Communist Party constituted in April 1947. The UMA had branches throughout the country and included a large number of women of different ideological and religious identities.

=== 1960s and 1970s ===
The convulsed period between the early 1970s until the 1976 coup d'état was one of intense feminist activism, although "undeniably all the groups tended to dissolve, dissidences increased and there were migrations towards new formulas that, finally, were also extinguished." Two prominent groups of the period were the Unión Feminista Argentina (UFA; English: Argentine Feminist Union) and the Movimiento de Liberación Feminista (MLF; English: Feminist Liberation Movement), which were formed in 1970 and 1972 respectively.

=== 1980s and 1990s ===
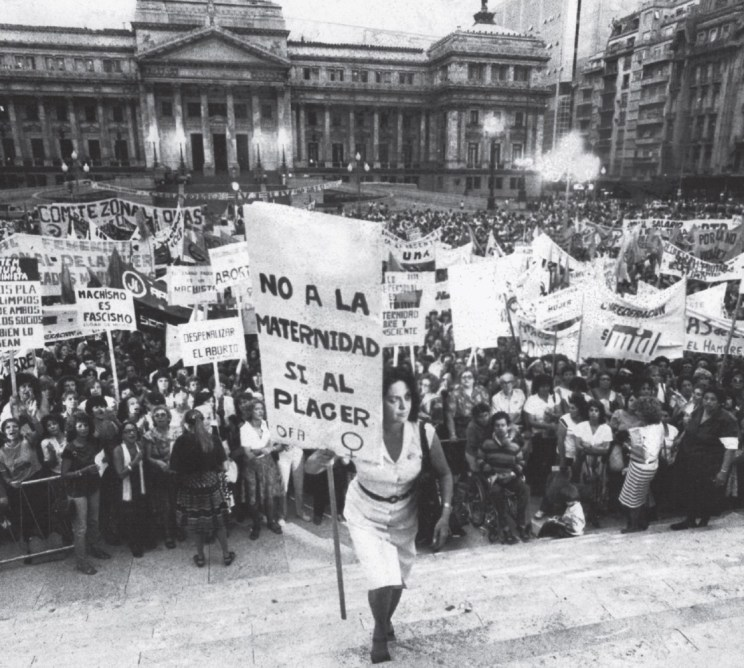
María Elena Oddone going up the stairs of the Congressional Plaza with her controversial banner during the first Women's Day demonstrations held in Argentina since its return to democracy, 1984.

The 1983 general election marked the return of democratic rule in Argentina and was accompanied by the surge of an intense feminist and women's movement. It was a period of "renewal of women's activities" and featured a greater incidence of social movements and unions, political parties, autonomous groups, research groups and professional associations. The international context played an important role in this, since the United Nations had decided that the decade 1975-1985 should be dedicated to the equal promotion of women on the part of the member countries. This decision emanated from the 1975 World Conference on Women in Mexico City, which to a large extent inaugurated the major international forums dedicated to women's rights. On 8 March 1984, the first International Women's Day demonstrations since the end of the military regime took place in the Congressional Plaza, in what is now considered a landmark. The event was organized by the Multisectorial de la Mujer (English: Multisectorial of Women), a space formed by members of women's groups, feminists, housewives and representatives of political parties and unions. An emblematic moment of the protests was when activist María Elena Oddone climbed up the stairs of the Monument of the Two Congresses and raised a banner that read "No to motherhood, yes to pleasure". Her banner, as well as those held by other radical feminists that day, was harshly criticized by the press for being too provocative. Oddone was also repudiated within the feminist movement. Elena Tchalidy, president of the Alicia Moureau de Justo Foundation, said: "March 8 was the first public act and she walked with [that sign]. It came out in the magazine that today would be Caras or Gente. Then she said to me: 'Oh, three girls came to me.' 'Yes', I told her, 'and you distanced a few thousand.'" Oddone recalled the meeting with the Multisectorial de la Mujer that took place two days after the event in her autobiography, claiming she replied to their "lapidary critics": "I am not a feminist to please anyone but to tell the truth about our condition. I did not write those banners to be liked. If they caused scandal, it is because the truth is always scandalous. We received Dr. Justo with admiration and affection. Eighty years ago, she and her companions who asked for the right to vote were called 'crazy'. I am willing to wait the same number of years for my banners to be understood."

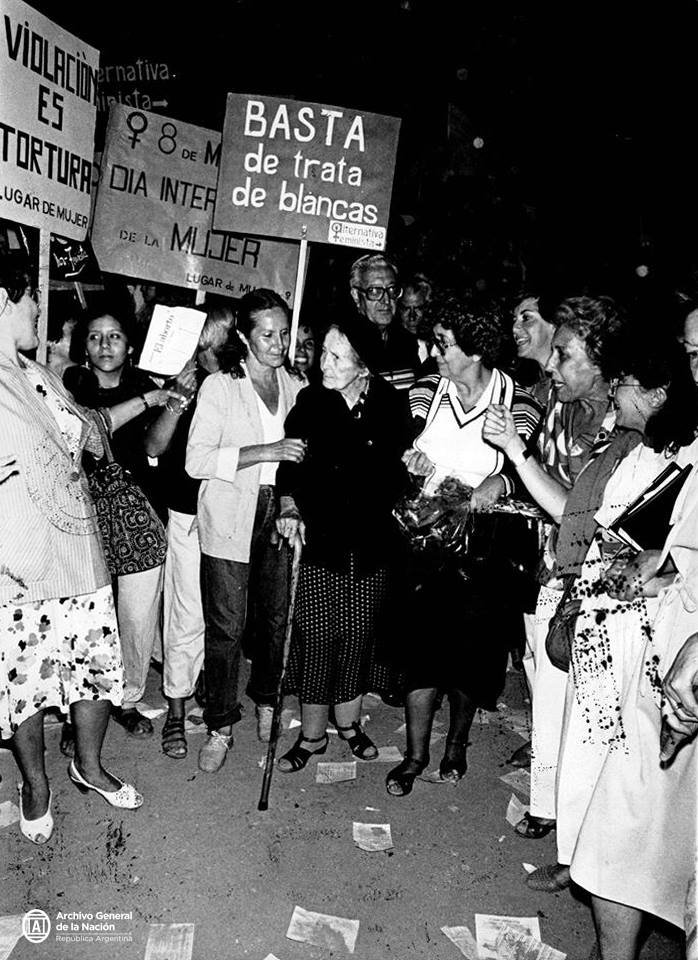
Alicia Moreau de Justo (centre) marching alongside feminist activists in 1986.

The post-dictatorship period saw the emergence of a new feminist journalism and alternative media, led by women such as María Elena Oddone, Hilda Rais, Moira Soto, María Elena Walsh and Cecilia Absatz. While one sector of feminist activism had a more institutional path and fought for laws such as shared parental authority, there was another, more "alternative" portion that was documented in magazines, newspapers and zines such as Brujas, Cuadernos de Existencia Lesbiana and Unidas. A celebrated publication of the early 1980s was Alfonsina, a periodical founded by journalist María Moreno that featured articles by people involved in feminist and gay activism, including Martín Caparrós, Diana Raznovich, Alicia D'Amico, Sara Facio, Néstor Perlongher, Márgara Averbach, Ana Amado and Alicia Genovese. Despite its underground condition, the magazine introduced the latest intellectual debates from Europe, mainly from Spain, Italy and France. Its editors identified with the "difference feminism" current, aiming to resignify "devalued" feminine values like motherhood and domesticity. The first issue of Alfonsina was published on 15 December 1983, and began with an editorial titled "¿Por qué?" (English: "Why?"), which read:

Because one can be and be loved. [...] Because we do not want to live against our mothers but to go with them towards a horizon where their hands no longer sustain us but neither say goodbye to us with a scarf of sorrows. Because one can be a Mother and be a Woman. [...] Because every talk between women has a bit of tango, of noise from a municipal fair, of rattle of scissors cutting a fringe, of lucid occurrences that are born and die in the dawn of the cock and of the drunkard who whistles.

Another renowned journal from that time was Feminaria, directed by Lea Fletcher and first published in June 1988. It has been described as "an endeavor designed to integrate northern feminist theory with Southern Cone intellectual production." Unlike other publications they criticized for being too "unifocal", the writers of Feminaria did not align with a single concept of feminism and instead aimed to "show the breadth and variety that there is in [it]." Fletcher said in 1997: "we in Feminaria proposed to organize a pluralist space for feminist discussion, democratize information, and share high-level feminist theory produced both within and beyond the country."

The Fundación Mujeres en Igualdad (MEI), known in English as the Women in Equality Foundation, is an Argentine NGO created in March 1990. It has been awarded consultative status with United Nations ECOSOC. The foundation sets out to combat gender based violence and discrimination against women by promoting welfare, participation and empowerment in the political, economic, social and cultural spheres. From its inception Women in Equality promoted the use of the new technologies intensively, being the first women's NGO in Argentina to have a website. Through such initiatives it has networked and created partnerships with NGOs and with the women's movement both at the national and international levels.

During the 1990s, Argentine LGBT activism took off, and the end of the decade saw the entry of travestis (Note: "Travesti" (meaning transvestite) was historically a pejorative used to designate trans women and crossdressers in South America. The word has been reappropriated by activists and is now used as a non-binary label for people assigned male at birth that have a transfeminine gender identity, but choose not to identify themselves as trans women.) into spaces of feminist discussion, marking the beginning of transfeminism in Argentina. The inclusion in particular was that of Lohana Berkins, one of the most prominent leaders of the travesti movement. Berkins got into feminism in the 1990s through meetings with lesbian feminists such as Alejandra Sarda, Ilse Fuskova, Chela Nadio and Fabiana Tron.

=== 2000s and 2010s ===
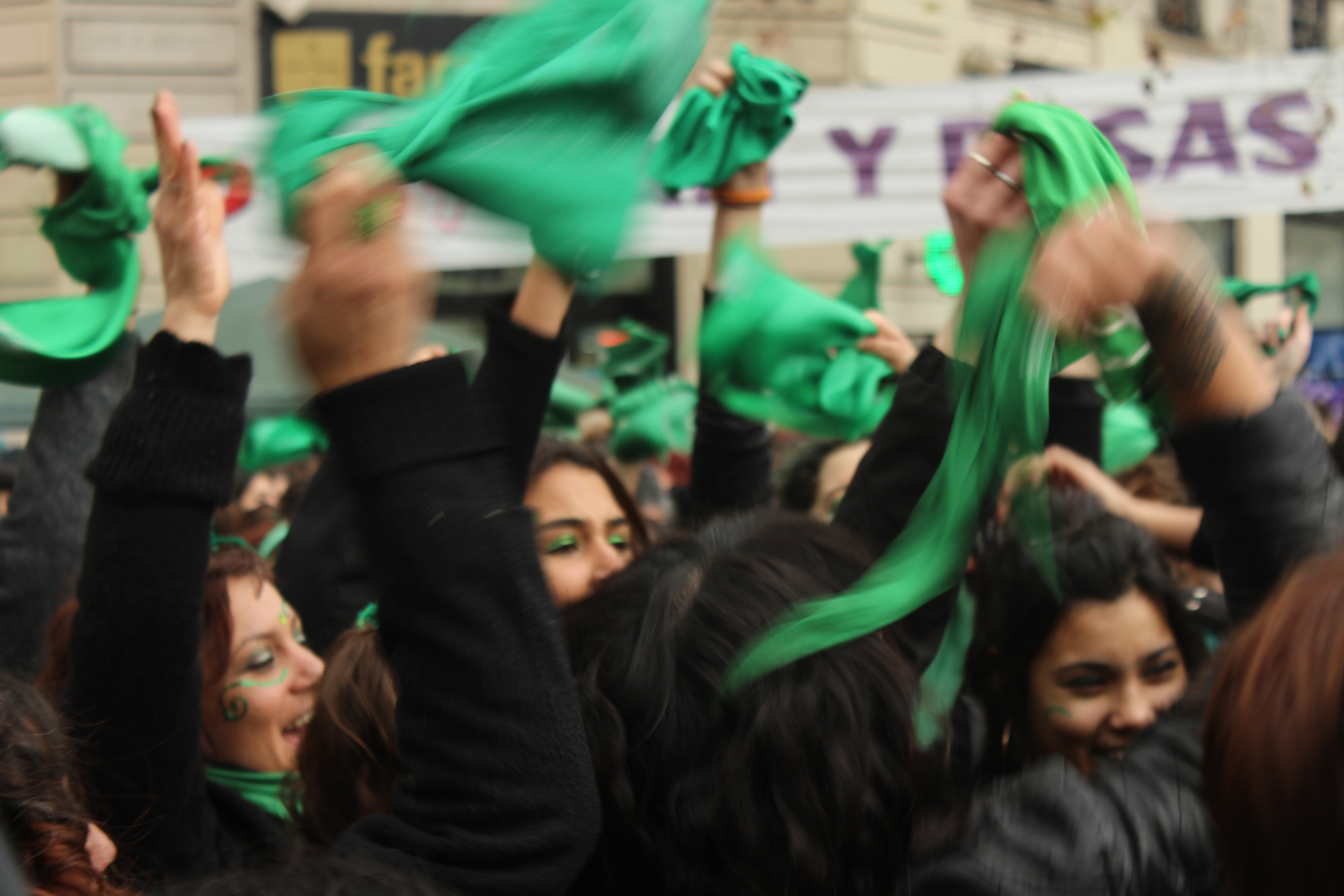
Girls in Buenos Aires waving their green handkerchief in support of the legalization of abortion, 8 August 2018.

The most recent wave of Argentine feminism has become one of the largest women's movements in Latin American history. Focusing on such issues as the access to legal and safe abortions, increasing access to contraceptives, the professionalization of women's work, the equalization of the salary disparity between men and women, lowering the rates of femicide, increasing women's representation in major institutions, expanding maternal leave, rethinking society with feminist theory in mind, and emboldening the voice of women.

This new wave of feminist activism is sometimes referred as "the revolution of the daughters" (Spanish: la revolución de las hijas). The term was coined by journalist Luciana Peker and refers to the preponderance of adolescents in the movement, which she considers to be the "fruit of a construction of more than thirty years of feminism, of a tradition of three decades of Encuentros de Mujeres and of a horizontal, federal and autonomous way of doing politics."

Prominent modern movements include the Ni Una Menos campaign and the pro-choice rallies. Ni una menos stems from the killing of Lucia Perez, and the larger issue of femicide in Argentina. The modern pro-choice rallies generally stem from issues surrounding women's safety. For example, in late 2018, an 11-year-old girl was made pregnant and subsequently refused access to an abortion. The provincial health secretary, Gustavo Vigliocco, defended this decision, claiming that the girl and her family wanted the baby. Eventually, the young girl had to have an emergency cesarean section, 23 weeks into her pregnancy.

Modeled after the past Mothers Movement's triangular headscarf, the green handkerchief or pañuelo verde began as a symbol used in pro-choice rallies, but has expanded in meaning to be symbolic of the feminist movement as a whole. The use of the green handkerchief as a feminist distinction became immensely popular during 2018 and has become part of the country's social imaginary. It is traditionally worn around the neck during feminist demonstrations, but can now be seen on a daily basis hanging from bags, backpacks, balconies or even used around the wrist or to tie hair.

Given the heterogeneity of current Argentine feminism, conflicts and debates have arisen within the movement. One of the most prominent is the one referring to sex work and prostitution. This debate has risen on the agenda due to the participation of key figures heavily invested on the issue: on one hand sex worker activists and on the other, several prominent leaders of the LGBT movement that advocate the abolition of sex work.

== See also ==
- Abortion in Argentina
- Encuentro Nacional de Mujeres
- Human rights in Argentina
- List of Argentine feminists
- LGBT rights in Argentina
- Transgender rights in Argentina
- Women in Argentina

== Bibliography ==
- Barrancos, Dora (October 2010) [2007]. Mujeres en la sociedad argentina. Una historia de cinco siglos (e-book) (in Spanish). Editorial Sudamericana. ISBN 978-9500728805.
- Carlson, Marifran (1 August 2005). ¡Feminismo!: The Woman's Movement in Argentina. Chicago Review Press. ISBN 978-0897331685.
- Hammond, Gregory. The Women’s Suffrage Movement and Feminism in Argentina from Roca to Perón (University of New Mexico Press, 2011)
- Jaquette, Jane (9 March 2018) [1994]. The Women's Movement In Latin America: Participation And Democracy, Second Edition. Routledge. ISBN 978-0813384887.
- Lavrin, Asunción (1998) [1995]. Women, Feminism, and Social Change in Argentina, Chile, and Uruguay, 1890-1940. University of Nebraska Press. ISBN 978-0803279735.
- Lorenzo, María Fernanda (21 June 2017) [2016]. "Que sepa coser, que sepa bordar, que sepa abrir la puerta para ir a la universidad" (in Spanish). Editorial Eudeba. ISBN 978-9502325712.
- Macoc, Lucía (2011). "Feminismo e Identidades políticas a principios del siglo XX en la Argentina: construcciones discursivas sobre la Mujer en el socialismo y el anarquismo" (PDF). hdl:2133/5967.
- Nari, Marcela M. A. (1995). "Feminismo y diferencia sexual. Análisis de la 'Encuesta Feminista Argentina'de 1919" (PDF). Boletín del Instituto de Historia Argentina y Americana Dr. Emilio Ravignani (in Spanish) (12): 61–86.
- Nari, Marcela M. A. (2004). Políticas de maternidad y maternalismo político: Buenos Aires, 1890-1940 (in Spanish). Routledge. ISBN 978-9507864254.
- Perón, Eva (1953) [1951]. My mission in life. Translated by Cherry, Ethel. New York: Vantage Press.
