= Nicola L =

French multidisciplinary artist (1932–2018)

Nicola L.
- Born: Nicole Jeannine Suzanne Leuthe; 1932; Mazagan, Morocco
- Died: December 31, 2018 (aged 85–86); Los Angeles, California, U.S.
- Education: Académie Julian; École nationale supérieure des Beaux-Arts
- Years active: 1950s – 2018
- Known for: Conceptual artist, video artist, filmmaker, Nouveau réalisme, performance artist
- Notable work: Pénétrables
- Partner: Alfred Lanzenberg (m. 1956, div. 1982)
- Children: Christophe and David Lanzenberg
- Relatives: Suzanne and Jean Leuthe (siblings)
- Website: nicolal.com

Nicola L. (born Nicole Jeannine Suzanne Leuthe in 1932 – December 31, 2018) was a Moroccan-born French visual artist. Initially associated with French Pop Art Nouveau réalisme, she quickly developed her own interdisciplinary practice of conceptual art that encompassed sculpture, performance art, painting, film, and design. Themes such as sexuality, activism, political resistance, ecology, cosmology, and spirituality are recurring in her oeuvre. She is considered a visionary voice within the post-war avant-garde, with an enduring influence on contemporary discussions about the body, gender, and performative art. Throughout her career she created interactive sculptures, radical performances, and collage-like paintings, films, and plays. Her most famous sculptures include White Foot Sofa (1968) and Red Coat (1969). Her work has been acquired by several galleries, including FRAC Bretagne in France and MAMCO in Geneva.

Nicola L.'s work also engaged with radical ideas in feminist politics, equality, and collectivity. She became particularly known for her anthropomorphic sculptures that fused female bodies and domestic objects. As with other women artists such as Carolee Schneemann, Valie Export, Rosalyn Drexler, and Marisol, the nude feminine form became a recurring motif within her career. She described her work as "an ephemeral monument to freedom."

== Early years ==
Born in Mazagan Morocco to French parents. Nicola moved to Paris in 1954 to study abstract painting at the École nationale supérieure des Beaux-Arts, mentored by the painter Jean Souverbie who encouraged her to "cut the body up in the same way that light was cutting the live model." During this period she befriended Nouveau réalist art critic Pierre Restany and met Alfred Lanzenberg, whom she married in 1956. In 1966 Lanzenberg opened an art gallery in Brussels, collaborating with influential dealer Ileana Sonnabend on exhibitions of American Pop artists. During her studies, Nicola L. became aware first-hand of the prejudice faced by female artists and stopped using her surname, later shortening it to "L".

== Career ==
In the 1960s, Nicola L. became close to the French New Realist group, which advocated that art should comment on society using existing objects and materials. Motivated by Pierre Restany, the movement also included Yves Klein, Jean Tinguely, Christo and Niki de Saint Phalle. In 1964, while working between Paris and Ibiza, L. met the conceptual Argentine artist Alberto Greco, who had an important influence on her artistic development. Having recently returned from New York where he had encountered Marcel Duchamp, Greco repeatedly questioned L.'s pursuit of painting.

Terming much of her sculpture as functional art, Nicola L. created objects resembling furniture, which were based on the artist tracing real bodies, exaggerating, and simplifying their contours. In La Femme Commode (1969–2014) lacquered wood cabinets are arranged in the shape of a female body, with eyes, mouths, and breasts serving as drawers. L.'s 1969 sculpture Little TV Woman: I Am the Last Woman Object depicts an oversized female form with a television monitor for a stomach, periodically displaying a message: "I am the last woman object. You can take my lips, touch my breasts, caress my stomach, my sex. But I repeat it, it is the last time." The soft and pliable forms in The Giant Foot (1967) and White Foot Sofa (1968) are meant to be opened up and sat upon. These were the artist's first experiments with vinyl.

One of her works from Pénétrables, an eleven-person garment titled Red Coat (1969) was first activated in a performance at the Isle of Wight festival in 1970 with participation from musicians Caetano Veloso and Gilberto Gil, members of the Neo-concrete movement in Brazil. She recalls, "at the end of the performance we were distributing gloves on which was written 'same skin for everybody', and people started chanting the phrase."

In 1975, Nicola L. shifted focus to film projects. In 1977 she directed the feature film Les Têtes sont Encore Dans L'île (The Heads are Still in the Island) with Terry Thomas and Pierral, shot in Ibiza. In 1979 Nicola L. moved to New York City, where she continued to focus on film making. Her first documentary captured the punk-rock band Bad Brains at the Lower East Side nightclub CBGB. This was followed by a 1981 documentary about activist Abbie Hoffman. Nicola L.'s final film was Doors Ajar at the Chelsea Hotel (2013), where she had lived for nearly three decades.

In the 1990s, Nicola L. returned to feminism through a series of paintings and works on paper. For Poems by Dorothy Parker (1994), she created collages on wood that included a snail form along with a snippet of a poem. The Femme Fatale paintings (1995), made from painted bed sheets accompanied by images and texts, explored women who had died tragic or violent deaths: among them Marilyn Monroe, Billie Holiday and Ulrike Meinhof.

Towards the end of her life, L. continued to develop her Pénétrables series with several public performances, including The Blue Cape, which premiered in Cuba in 2002, followed by performances on the Great Wall of China (2005), the Venice Biennale and (asCape of Blues) at Place Saint-Sulpice in Paris (both 2016). L.'s Red Coat was performed in London on the occasion of the work's display at the Tate Modern gallery in 2015.

== Influence and legacy ==
Nicola L.'s work has been acquired by international collections, including Centre Pompidou, Paris; FRAC Bretagne, France; Gallery of Modern Art, Glasgow; Musée d'Arts Plastiques, Brussels; Museum of Contemporary Art, Antwerp; and MAMCO, Geneva. The Nicola L. Estate is represented by Alison Jacques, London in collaboration with the Nicola L. Collection & Archive.
