= María Collazo =

Uruguayan educator and journalist

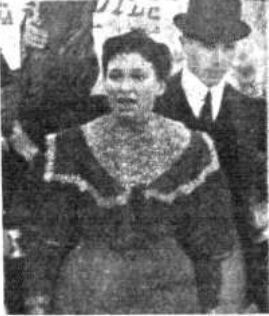
- Born: 6 March 1884; Montevideo, Uruguay
- Died: 22 March 1942 (aged 58); Montevideo, Uruguay
- Occupation: writer
- Known for: active for women's rights and anarchy in Buenos Aires
- Spouse: Pedreira
- Children: six

María Collazo (6 March 1884 – 22 March 1942) was a Uruguayan educator and journalist. She was active in Buenos Aires and she was repatriated to Uruguay in 1907.

== Life ==
Collazo was born in Montevideo in 1884.

In Buenos Aires in 1906 Collazo, Juana Rouco, Teresa Capolaretti and Virginia Bolten created the Emancipacion Center for Women anarchists.

In 1907 she was expelled from Argentina and she returned to Uruguay.

In 1909 Collazo joined the support for Francesc Ferrer i Guàrdia who was an anarchist who was executed after a show trial where he was found guilty of creating a week of protest. She and with Juana Rouco and Virginia Bolten she founded the newspaper Nueva Senda. The newspaper lasted only to the following year. It was concerned that women seemed so unaware of their rights. Women were maybe so exploited it was suggested that they should withdraw from paid work and strike unilaterally.

On 1 March 1911 President José Batlle y Ordóñez returned for a second term as president. In April 1911 the "Emancipation Women's Association", which was an anti-clerical women's rights association, was formed. Its first meeting was said to be stormy with much debate over its creation. This was a radical organisation that although it did not believe in violence it did seems prepared to defend its existence and take part in civil disobedience. Collazo and Virginia Bolten led the discussion inside the organisation when it refused to join forces with the Uruguayan Section of the Pan American Federation started by María Abella de Ramírez. "Emancipation" intended to join forces with male groups to forward its aims including improving women's education and anti-cleric activism.

In 1923 she was one of the founders of the Uruguayan Trade Union (Union Syndicale Uruguayenne, USU).

== Private life ==
She married Pedreira, a cigar worker, in 1902 and had five children who were all given names from the classics: Venus, Leda, Spartacus, Themis and Hebe. Pedreira died in 1908 and she had a new relationship and a sixth child, Aurora.
