= Alison Jacques =

Art gallery in London

Coordinates: 51.51744°N 0.13671°W

Alison Jacques is a contemporary art gallery in London, established in 2004 by Alison Jacques.

== History ==
After a curating stint at the British School at Rome, Jacques teamed up with Charles Asprey, and in 1998 they opened their gallery, which ran for seven years.

Originally sited in a small townhouse off Bond Street, London W1, Jacques's gallery relocated in 2007 to a 3,500-square-foot (330 m^{2}) space at 16-18 Berners Street opposite the Sanderson Hotel in Fitzrovia. In 2023, the gallery announced plans to move into a three-storey, 560 m^{2} (6,000 sq ft) space on Cork Street which had previously been inhabited by Lisson Gallery on a temporary contract and was later refurbished by the architect Mike Rundell.

The gallery often holds events and talks in conjunction with the exhibition programme, hosted by curators and critics. The gallery has published books including Lygia Clark, Sheila Hicks, Dorothea Tanning and Hannah Wilke as well as supporting museum monographs on the gallery artists.

== Artists ==
Since opening her own gallery in 2004, Jacques has developed an exhibition program of both unknown and established artists:

- Fernanda Gomes
- Sheila Hicks
- Graham Little

The gallery also represents the estates of several artists, including:

- Mária Bartuszová
- Lygia Clark (since 2010)
- Nicola L
- Roy Oxlade
- Gordon Parks
- Betty Parsons
- Dorothea Tanning
- Hannah Wilke
- Lenore Tawney

Notably, Jacques has worked with the estate of Robert Mapplethorpe since 1999, starting when she was in partnership with Asprey. Her curatorial approach has been on unknown bodies of work by Mapplethorpe such as his early Polaroids from the 1970s and his works and sculptures.

== Recognition ==
In 2019, TimeOut ranked the gallery as one of the top 50 in London. Eddy Frankel said, "This Fitzrovia gallery has some serious art clout, representing the estates of Robert Mapplethorpe and Ana Mendieta."
