= Petrona Rosende =

Argentine journalist and poet

Petrona Rosende (1797–1863) was the first female journalist in Argentina. She was born in Montevideo, Uruguay, but during Montevideo's occupation by Brazil she moved to Buenos Aires. She edited the feminist Buenos Aires periodical La Aljaba (which ran from 1830 to 1831). Its motto was "We will be free of men's injustice only when we no longer live among them." All of its 18 issues are now held at the Museo Mitre.

In 1835 she went back to Montevideo. On June 20 of that year she published a patriotic sonnet titled Al arribo de mi patria in the newspaper El Nacional. That year she also opened the Casa de la Educación para Señoritas.

In 1861 she was granted a state pension for her services to Uruguay.

On March 8, 2011, Uruguay issued a stamp with her picture on it as part of its Bicentennial Women Series.

== See also ==
- Feminism in Argentina
