= Alberto Greco =

Argentine artist (1931-1965)

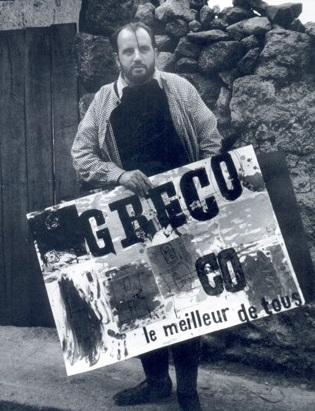
- Born: January 15 1931; Buenos Aires, Argentina
- Died: October 14 1965 (aged 34); Barcelona, Spain
- Movement: Conceptual Art; Informal Art

Alberto Greco (January 15 1931 – October 12 1965) was an Argentine artist who was instrumental in the development of conceptual art in Argentina, Brazil, and Spain. His best-known artwork is a series called Vivo Dito in which Greco draws attention to objects and people as living art pieces within everyday life.

== Biography ==
Alberto Greco was born in Buenos Aires, Argentina in 1931. He was part of a family of five; his older brother, Jorge Julio, was eight years his senior, and his brother Edgardo was younger than him by four years. His mother was Ana Victoria Disolina Ferraris and his father was Francisco José. Greco never married nor did he leave traces of a significant other in his life despite having friends. This allowed him to focus on his artistic pursuits and travel extensively. Alberto Greco was a student of Tomás Maldonado and attended many workshops put on by Cecilia Marcouch. Greco also attended the School of Fine Arts but dropped out. Throughout his time as an artist, he also worked and lived with many different artists. Greco not only influenced others but was also influenced by other artists.

== Career ==
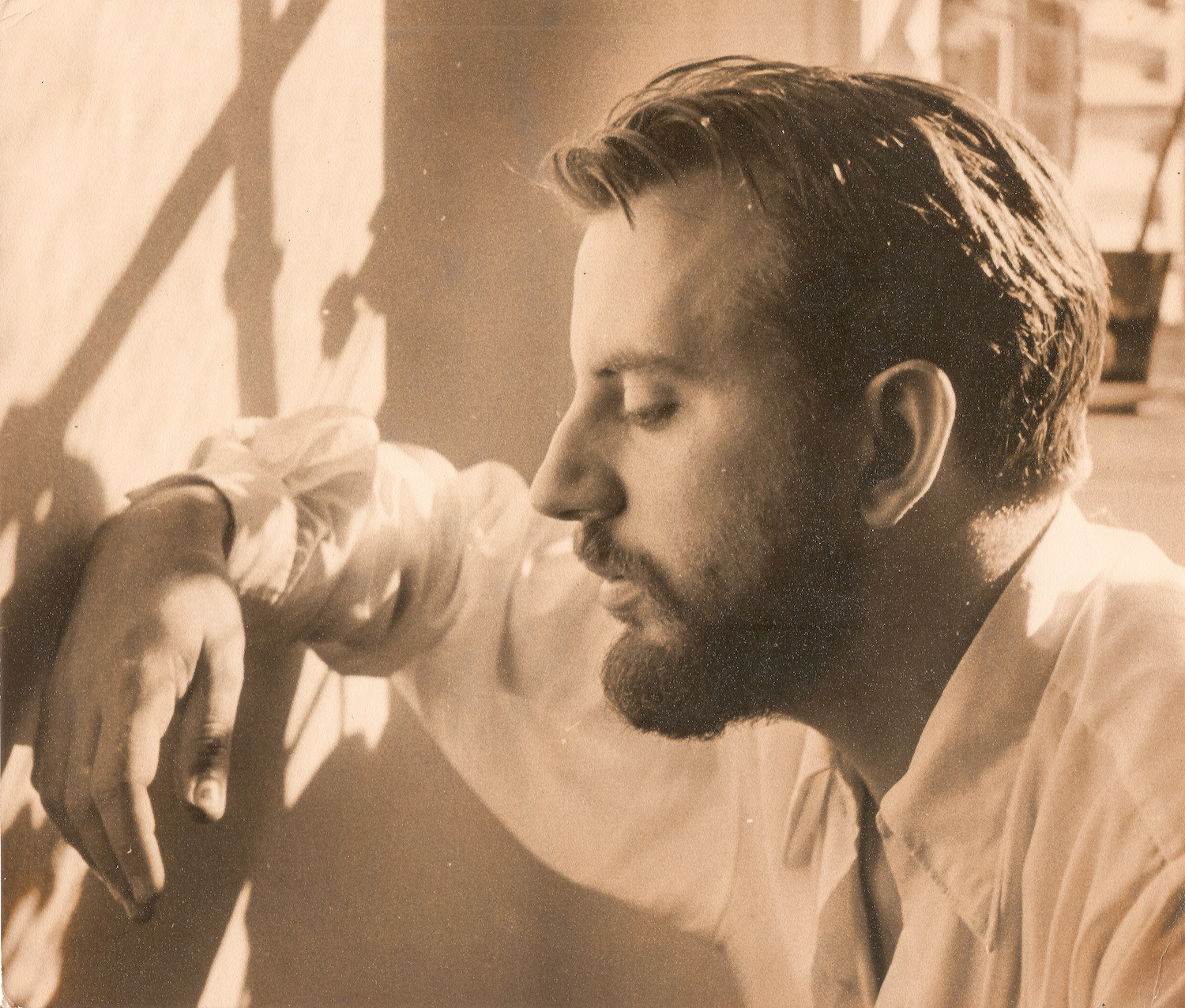
Portrait of Alberto Greco by Ilse Fuskova, 1957.

Alberto Greco not only considered himself the greatest informalist of his time, but acted as if he was. Informalism branched off from expressionism. Informal art explored possibilities of gestures and materialism that were typically non-traditional, and signage as the basis of communication. Informalism is creating artwork or signs, then giving them meaning afterward. This focused on giving viewers the freedom to think for themselves and decide what they see.

Greco only desired a handful of things, such as validation, glory, and fame, and tried getting them in various ways. Due to his eagerness to be famous and his rebellious ways, Greco would often get himself invited into places to later on not show up. Soon after this period, Greco's name began to be associated with the idea of scandal and imposture. To this Greco responded, "I am so serious a painter that I have no need to assume the appearance of one." Alberto Greco frequently expressed his desire for personal and artistic growth, which he linked to erasing societal prejudice. Because of Greco's response to people's words and his ways of excluding prejudice, he became a symbol of the liberating angel to the marginalized. This is one of the reasons many consider him a leader. Greco's work often sparked debate, with some artists defending his approach and others critiquing his unorthodox methods.

Alberto Greco created numerous manifestos and these are just a few of them. Greco created many different manifestos during his Vito Dito series such as his "Gran Manifiesto-Rollo Arte Vito Dito". Alberto Greco created a manifesto titled "Grand vito-dito Anti Manifiesto ".

== Vivo Dito ==
=== Origins of Vivo Dito and personal life ===
Alberto Greco often reflected on his identity and sought to redefine himself through his art and actions. He often was overwhelmed by his being and through this aspired to break away from his identity. Greco would often beat himself up over the idea of becoming famous and pushed himself to exceed his own expectations. Simultaneously, he would glorify himself by hanging posters around cities he frequented, which said things like "Greco how great you are" and "Greco, America's greatest informalist painter." Greco frequently referenced themes of hope and rebellion in his work, connecting them to broader societal and personal struggles. Despite this, Greco’s actions often challenged societal norms, and he described himself as a moralist in his work. Like an unbalanced scale, he would often go from smoking cigarettes on the street to being waited on by maids in odd environments such as parks or gardens. Greco was also fascinated with quotidian reality; which is the idea of belonging to each day. With this fascination, Greco began to create the Vivo Dito project.

=== Vivo Dito project ===
Vivo Dito means "living finger." This was a series Greco created in 1962 to emphasize the idea of living in the now. For this project, Greco would walk around a town and sign objects, people, or animals. Greco once wrote a manifesto on a scroll and strung it around the town, calling it "Gran Manifiesto- Rollo Arte Vivo Dito". He would also draw circles on the ground and sign his name outside the circle. Some accounts suggest that Greco once drew a circle around a man during his Vivo Dito project, symbolically trapping him within the artwork. He left the art in its place because he believed "once that object is found, it lives in its place, it does not transform it or carry it off to an art gallery."

Greco described Vivo Dito as a living art form, emphasizing its role as a dynamic and evolving concept. The point of this was to redefine art because he lived as a rebel against all formalizing and institutionalizing tendencies of art. Greco believed that art is an act of discovery and a process of looking. Through this project, he aimed to teach people to see the beauty of everyday objects. Greco created this series because he believed that people should not create art and then go back and re-decorate it. Greco often compared a finished project to a dead object; when something dies you do not go to its grave and dig it up to change its appearance or add to it, you simply let it rest, as you should to your artwork. Greco often wrote "live art seeks its object"; this is the reason he went out and pursued objects to sign because art is all around us. This allowed Greco to create a canvas anywhere and everywhere instead of limiting the idea of canvas to something that could have a measurement.

Greco created many different paintings during his Vivo Dito series such as these.

== Exhibitions and Artworks ==
=== First Live Art Exhibit ===
One of Greco's first exhibits that showed live art was in Paris in 1962. This exhibition belonged to Pablo Curatella Manes and Germein Derbecq and showcased other artists as well as Greco. His piece was called "30 Mice From Neo-Figuration". This artwork included 30 mice inside a glass box, in which the insides were painted black. Greco's piece was taken out of the exhibition because the mice began to reek. After being kicked out, Greco took the mice to a hotel and fed them bread; he later debated showing the eaten pieces of bread as his artwork. Not too long afterward, Greco’s unconventional art involving live mice reportedly caused issues at a hotel due to complaints about odor.

=== Sin Titulo Series ===
Greco not only created art such as the Vito Dito series, but had many different forms he involved himself in. Some of his art had political influences, such as his piece about President Kennedy's assassination during Greco's "Sin Titulo Series". "Sin Titulo" translates to "without a title" from Spanish. For examples, follow these links: Sin Titulo, Sin Titulo, Sin Titulo, Sin Titulo, Sin Titulo , Sin Titulo.

=== Other Artworks ===
Here are some of the many different paintings Greco created during his time.

Greco also had the opportunity to present some of his artwork before the President of Italy in 1963. He here performed a political piece that included rats and was titled "Christ 63". This, however, did not go the right way because Greco ended up being kicked out of Italy because he released rats in front of the President.

=== Other forms of art ===
Greco also immersed himself in different forms of art and created poetry as well as jewellery. He published his first poetry book in 1950.

== Death ==
Alberto Greco committed suicide on October 14, 1965, a few months after his 35th birthday.Greco's death in 1965 has been interpreted by some as a deliberate act of social commentary and performance art. Greco's cause of death was an overdose of barbiturates. Barbiturates are a type of antidepressant prescribed for sleeping disorders. This type of drug is meant to repress the activity of the central nervous system reducing anxiety, but impairing memory and judgment at the same time. The purpose of this was to illustrate to the world that he was one of the best informalist artists in the world. Greco emphasized the importance of big gestures and overdramatized performances; in his mind, that was the only way to convey his ideas. Greco's final actions have been interpreted as an attempt to convey his artistic vision in an impactful way. Before committing suicide, Greco called his family to let them know this was happening and invited them to watch; his family declined the offer. While dying, Greco wrote down all of the feelings he was experiencing while on barbiturates. Before losing feeling in his body he wrote the word "Fin" on his left hand; fin meaning "end".
