= Hannah Wilke =

American artist (1940–1993)

- Wilke in her work S.O.S. — Starification Object Series (1974)
- Born: Arlene Hannah Butter; March 7, 1940; New York City
- Died: January 28, 1993 (aged 52); Houston, Texas
- Education: Stella Elkins Tyler School of Fine Art, Temple U, Philadelphia
- Known for: Sculpture, photography, body art, video art
- Notable work: S.O.S. — Starification Object Series (1974); Intra-Venus (1992–1993)
- Awards: NEA Grants in sculpture and performance, Guggenheim Grant for sculpture

Hannah Wilke (born Arlene Hannah Butter; March 7, 1940 – January 28, 1993) was an American painter, sculptor, photographer, video artist and performance artist. Her work is known for exploring issues of feminism, sexuality and femininity.

== Biography ==
Hannah Wilke was born in New York City on March 7, 1940, to Jewish parents; her grandparents were Eastern European immigrants. She graduated from Great Neck North High School, on Long Island, in 1957. In 1962, she received a Bachelor of Fine Arts and a Bachelor of Science in Education from the Tyler School of Art at Temple University, Philadelphia. She taught art in several high schools for approximately 30 years and joined the faculty of the School of Visual Arts. After her graduation the same year she taught art at high schools in Plymouth Meeting, Pennsylvania, from 1961 to 1965, and in White Plains, New York, from 1965 to 1970. After leaving White Plains, she joined the School of Visual Arts, in New York (1972-1991).

From 1969 to 1977, Wilke was in a relationship with the American Pop artist Claes Oldenburg; they lived, worked and traveled together during that time. Wilke's work was exhibited nationally and internationally throughout her life and continues to be shown posthumously. Solo exhibitions of her work were first mounted in New York and Los Angeles in 1972. Her first full museum exhibition was held at the University of California, Irvine, in 1976, and her first retrospective at the University of Missouri in 1989.

Wilke lived with Donald Goddard since 1982, marrying in 1992 shortly before her death. Posthumous retrospectives were held in Copenhagen, Helsinki, and Malmö, Sweden in 2000 and at the Neuberger Museum of Art from 2008 to 2009. Since her death, Wilke's work has been shown in solo gallery shows, group exhibitions, and several surveys of women's art, including WACK! Art and the Feminist Revolution at the Museum of Contemporary Art Los Angeles, Elles at the Centre Georges Pompidou, and Revolution in the Making: Abstract Sculpture by Women, 1947 – 2016 at Hauser & Wirth Los Angeles.

The Hannah Wilke Collection and Archive, Los Angeles was founded in 1999 by Hannah Wilke's sister Marsie Scharlatt and her family. Since 2009, it has been represented by Alison Jacques Gallery.

Her image is included in the iconic 1972 poster Some Living American Women Artists by Mary Beth Edelson.

=== Early work ===
Wilke first gained renown with her "vulval" terra-cotta sculptures in the 1960s. First exhibited in New York in the late 1960s, her sculptures are often cited as some of the first explicit vaginal imagery arising from the women's liberation movement. Throughout her life, Wilke incorporated the imagery through various media, colors and sizes, including large floor installations, becoming her signature form. Some of her mediums included clay, chewing gum, kneaded erasers, laundry lint and latex. Wilke's use of unconventional materials is typical of feminist art, nodding to women's historical lack of access to traditional art supplies and education. Wilke reported that the reason she chose chewing gum was because ″it's the perfect metaphor for the American women—chew her up, get what you want out of her, throw her out and pop in a new piece.″

Wilke's sculptures were an innovative example of eroticism, using a style that combined post-minimalism and feminist aesthetics. A consummate draftswoman, Wilke created numerous drawings, beginning in the early 1960s and continuing throughout her life. In a review of Wilke's drawings at Ronald Feldman Fine Arts in 2010, Thomas Micchelli wrote in The Brooklyn Rail, "At her core, she was a maker of things ... an artist whose sensuality and humor are matched by her formal acumen and tactile rigor."

She performed live and videotaped performance art, beginning in 1974 with Hannah Wilke Super-t-Art, a live performance at the Kitchen, New York, which she also made into an iconic photographic work. Wilke's performances evoke the likes of Simone Forti, Trisha Brown, and Yvonne Rainer. The sculptural art Wilke created, with its unconventional materials and feminist narratives also relates to the work of Louise Bourgeois, Eva Hesse, Alina Szapocznikow, and Niki de St Phalle.

=== Body art ===
In 1974, Wilke began work on her photographic body art piece S.O.S — Starification Object Series, in which she merged her minimalist sculpture and her own body by creating tiny vulval sculptures out of chewing gum and sticking them to herself. She then had herself photographed in various pin-up poses, providing a juxtaposition of glamour and something resembling tribal scarification. Wilke has related the scarring on her body to an awareness of the Holocaust. These poses exaggerate and satirize American cultural values of feminine beauty and fashion and also hint at an interest in ceremonial scarification. The 50 self-portraits were originally created as a game, "S.O.S.Starificaion Object Series: An Adult Game of Mastication", 1974–75, which Wilke made into an installation that is now in the Centre Pompidou, Paris. She also performed this piece publicly in Paris in 1975, having audience members chew the gum for her before she sculpted them and placed them on papers that she hung on the wall. Wilke also used colored chewing gum as a medium for individual sculptures, using multiple pieces of gum to create a complex layering representing the vulva. Wilke's use of vaginas and vulvas refer to her idea of ″natural womanhood″, in order to support her argument that women are biologically superior. Later on in 1976 she once again conjured the pin-up poses in her self-portrait, Marxism and Art: Beware of Fascist Feminism.

Wilke coined the term "performalist self-portraits" to credit photographers who assisted her, including her father (First Performalist Self-Portrait, 1942–77) and her sister, Marsie (Butter) Scharlatt (Arlene Hannah Butter and Cover of Appearances, 1954–77). The title of Wilke's photographic and performance work, So Help Me Hannah, 1979, was taken from a vernacular phrase from the 1930s and '40s and has been interpreted as playing off of the Jewish mother stereotype and referencing Wilke's relationship with her mother.

Besides Hannah Wilke Super-t-Art, 1974, other performances in which Wilke used her body include Gestures, 1974; Hello Boys, 1975; Intercourse with ... (audio installation) 1974–1976; Intercourse with ... (video) 1976; and Hannah Wilke Through the Large Glass performed at the Philadelphia Museum of Art in 1977.

=== Death and Intra-Venus ===
Hannah Wilke died in Houston, Texas, in 1993 from lymphoma. Her last work, Intra-Venus (1992–1993), is a posthumously published photographic record of her physical transformation and deterioration resulting from chemotherapy and bone marrow transplant. The photographs, taken by her husband, confront the viewer with personal images of Wilke progressing from midlife happiness to bald, damaged, and resigned. Intra-Venus mirrors her photo diptych Portrait of the Artist with Her Mother, Selma Butter, 1978–82, which portrayed her mother's struggles with breast cancer and "having literally incorporated her mother, illness and all." Intra-Venus was exhibited and published posthumously partially in response to Wilke's feelings that clinical procedures hide patients as if dying were a "personal shame".

The Intra-Venus works also include watercolor Face and Hand drawings, Brushstrokes, a series of drawings made from her own hair and the Intra-Venus Tapes, a 16-channel videotape installation.

== Pose and narcissism ==
Wilke often features herself as a posing glamour model. Her use of self in photography and performance art, however, has been interpreted as a celebration and validation of Self, Women, the Feminine, and Feminism. Conversely, it has also been described as an artistic deconstruction of cultural modes of female vanity, narcissism, and beauty.

Wilke referred to herself as a feminist artist from the beginning. The art critic Ann-Sargent Wooster said that Wilke's identification with the feminist movement was confusing because of her beauty — her self-portraitures looked more like a Playboy centerfold than the typical feminist nudes. According to Wooster,

The problem Wilke faced in being taken seriously is that she was conventionally beautiful and her beauty and self-absorbed narcissism distracted you from her reversal of the voyeurism inherent in women as sex objects. In her photographs of herself as a goddess, a living incarnation of great works of art or as a pin-up, she wrested the means of production of the female image from male hands and put them in her own.

If critics found Wilke's beauty an impediment to understanding her work, this changed in the early 1990s when Wilke began documenting the decay of her body ravaged by lymphoma. Wilke's use of self-portraiture has been explored in detail in writing about her last photographic series, Intra Venus.

Wilke once answered the critics who commented on her body being too beautiful for her work by saying "People give me this bullshit of, 'What would you have done if you weren't so gorgeous?' What difference does it make? ... Gorgeous people die as do the stereotypical 'ugly.' Everybody dies."

== Critical recognition ==
During her lifetime, Wilke was widely exhibited and received critical praise while also being viewed as controversial. However, until recently, museums were hesitant to acquire work by women artists who, including Wilke, engaged in protests decrying their lack of inclusion during the feminist movement of the 1970s. While still alive, Wilke's work was in a few permanent collections, showcasing the confrontational use of the female sexuality. Since her death, Wilke's work has been acquired for the permanent collections of The Museum of Modern Art, New York, the Whitney Museum of American Art, New York, Los Angeles County Museum of Art, Museum of Contemporary Art, Los Angeles, and in European museums such as the Centre Pompidou, Paris.

== Solo exhibitions ==
- 1976, Fine Arts Gallery, University of California, Irvine
- 1978, MoMA PS1, Long Island City, New York
- 1979, Washington Project for the Arts, Washington, DC
- 1989, Gallery 210, University of Missouri, St Louis
- 1998, Hannah Wilke: A Retrospective, Nikolaj Contemporary Art Center, Copenhagen (traveling exhibition)
- 2000, Uninterrupted Career: Hannah Wilke 1940–1993, Neue Gesellschaft für bildende Kunst, Berlin
- 2006, Exchange Values, Artium- Centro Museo Vasco de Arte Contemporaneo, Vitoria-Gasteiz, Spain
- 2008, Hannah Wilke: Gestures, Neuberger Museum of Art, Purchase, New York
- 2021, Hannah Wilke: Art for Life’s Sake, Pulitzer Arts Foundation, St. Louis

== Awards ==
She received a Creative Artists Public Service Grant (1973); National Endowment for the Arts Grants (1987, 1980, 1979, 1976); Pollock-Krasner Foundation Grants (1992, 1987); a Guggenheim Fellowship (1982), and an International Association of Art Critics Award (1993).

== Collections ==
Wilke's work is held in the following permanent collections:

- Brooklyn Museum
- Albright-Knox Art Gallery, Buffalo, NY
- Des Moines Art Center
- Tate, U.K.
- Los Angeles County Museum of Art
- Museo Nacional Centro de Arte Reina Sofía, Madrid, Spain
- Walker Arts Center, Minneapolis, MN
- Yale University Art Gallery, New Haven, CT
- Jewish Museum, New York, NY
- Metropolitan Museum of Art, New York, NY
- Solomon R. Guggenheim Museum, New York, NY
- Whitney Museum of American Art, New York, NY
- Allen Memorial Art Museum, Oberlin, OH
- Centre Georges Pompidou, Paris, France
- Princeton University Art Museum, Princeton, NJ
- David Winton Bell Gallery, Brown University, Providence, RI
- Nevada Museum of Art, Reno, NV
- Rose Art Museum, Brandeis University, Waltham, MA
- University of Michigan Museum of Art, Ann Arbor, MI
