= Fundación Mujeres en Igualdad =

Argentine non-governmental organization

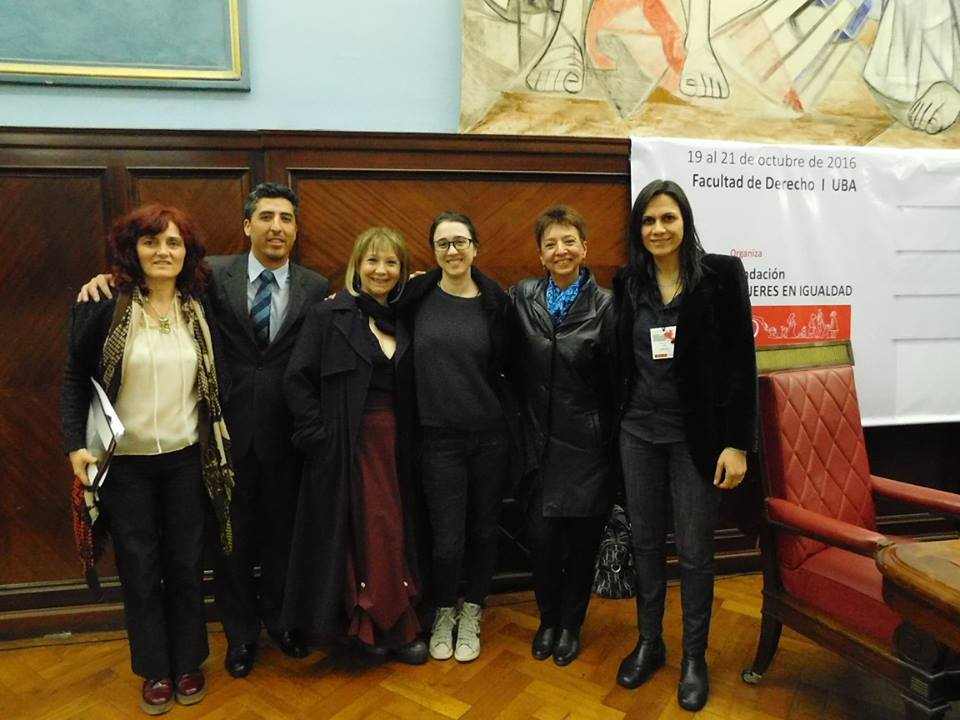
An MEI panel from 2016

The Fundación Mujeres en Igualdad (MEI), known in English as the Women in Equality Foundation, is an Argentine NGO created in March 1990. It has been awarded consultative status with United Nations ECOSOC. The foundation sets out to combat gender-based violence and discrimination against women by promoting welfare, participation, and empowerment in the political, economic, social and cultural spheres. From its inception Women in Equality promoted the use of the new technologies intensively, being the first women's NGO in Argentina to have a website. Through such initiatives, it has networked and created partnerships with NGOs and with the women's movement both at the national and international levels.

== Structure ==
Mujeres en Igualdad Foundation has its offices in Florida, Province of Buenos Aires. The founder of Women in Equality was Zita Montes de Oca, with Monique Thiteux-Altschul as its executive director.

I had the privilege to accompany her in the creation of Mujeres en Igualdad in 1990, when the women's movement set out to enact an electoral quota law: a tough goal to attain but which would ensure critical changes for women in the political field. Since then, we shared eight years of feminism, friendship, and hard work, as well as the discovery of the digital world into which we dived with a passion, seeing how the networks that Zita had built from within the public sphere, grew, tied together, were enriched both in the way we communicated as well as on the issues we discussed.

— Monique Thiteux-Altschul

== Fields of advocacy ==
- LGBT (lesbian, gay, bisexual and transgender rights): "For the human rights of the LGBT community" Project, sponsored by the Embassy of the United States of America in Buenos Aires.
- Gender violence: "Seven voices against gender-based violence" Project, coordinated by MEI and executed with the Office of Domestic Violence, the Office of Women in the Argentine Supreme Court of Justice, and the Women Judges Association of Argentina, with the Office of Victims against Violence of the Ministry of Justice and Human Rights, Vital Voices of Argentina and the Avon Foundation. With the support of the International Avon Foundation and Vital Voices Partnership.
- Clothes sizes law in Argentina: Mujeres en Igualdad was and is a consultant for National and Provincial laws on clothes sizes, and organizes monitoring and broadcasting campaigns.
- Gender and corruption: : Mujeres en Igualdad participated in the 1st Encuentro del Comité de Estrategia de la Coordinación de la Coalición UNCAC (United Nations Convention against Corruption) held in Vienna in June 2014 and became Regional Site for the Americas, UNCAC.
- Gender and sports: Mujeres en Igualdad has developed a team specially devoted to reverse cases of discrimination in sports. In 2012 the Foundation presented a draft for a law at the Women's Parliament of the Legislature of the City of Buenos Aires dealing with a compulsion for nonprofit civil associations, sports clubs, and sports federations to include equality of gender considerations in the Ruling Committees.
- Human trafficking: In 2003 Mujeres en Igualdad created the No to Trafficking Network that is coordinated through 2005, and organized numerous seminars and training workshops, with strong media support. The "Empowering Young women in the frontiers: Gender violence and human trafficking" project, financed by UN Women 2010-11 focused on young women in borderland regions (Jujuy/La Quiaca; Posadas/Encarnación) for them to become familiar with and exercise their rights and organize to prevent gender violence and human trafficking. They were qualified to carry out basic strategies in participative democracy with an emphasis on gender equality: requests for valid information (access to information), advocacy campaigns and claims and grievances were presented to accountable office holders in the light of noncompliance with their duties.
- Woman and politics: Mujeres en Igualdad was and continues to promote the warranties awarded by the Quota Law, by considering it a critical factor that explains the high degree of representation of women in Argentina's political life. Internationally, Argentina occupies fifth place with 39,1% of women in parliamentary duties. In this field, MEI continues to deepen its activities to generate reforms to guarantee equality of men and women citizens and carries out campaigns to achieve parity.
- Litigation on discrimination: The Freddo case, and Instituto Romero Brest case. In both, MEI acted as a litigant in both the Freddo company, as well as Physical Education institution, which included the criteria of Non-Discrimination and Gender Equality in their policies and procedures.

== Awards ==
- Award given by the Organization Mondiale de la Francophonie on March 19, 2015, for contributions in Sports, Inclusion, and Diversity with special emphasis on women.
- Alfredo Palacios Award given on September 19, 2013, by the Salón Eva Perón of the Honorable National Senate in recognition of the contributions of Mujeres en Igualdad to the fight against person trafficking and for their commitment to combat exploitation and protection and help for its victims.
- Award given in November 2012 by the Legislature of the City of Buenos Aires to Monique Altschul, Director of MEI, named "Distinguished Personality of Women's Human Rights".
- Dignidad Award given on June 4, 2009, to Monique Altschul by Asamblea Permanente de los Derechos Humanos, in recognition of her continuous devotion to the defense of women's rights.

== Breakfasts ==
Mujeres en Igualdad began its "About Representatives and Represented" Project breakfasts in 1993, and has since held 176 breakfasts, in the City of Buenos Aires and numerous provinces. An average of 70 sundry participants attends each month, including women senators, deputies ad legislators, judges, lawyers, functionaries, journalists, academics, union representatives, members of NGOs and international agencies, embassies, aboriginal people's organizations, politicians, and grass roots organizations. These monthly meetings are meant to make town halls debate women's issues from the political agenda as well as special topics that allow the women present to pool their thoughts and coordinate their work.

== International forum of women against the corruption ==
Mujeres en Igualdad Foundation has organized three forums and prepares its fourth Forum to be held in October 2016 to analyze and draft public policies and gendered budgets to counteract actions used by corruption to threaten women's human rights. The third Forum was held in 2008 in the School of Law in the University Buenos Aires, within the framework of Women for Equality and Transparency (UNIFEM – UNDEF, United Nations), to debate and share experiences fostering transparency.

== See also ==
- Encuentro Nacional de Mujeres
