= Diana Raznovich =

Argentinian writer

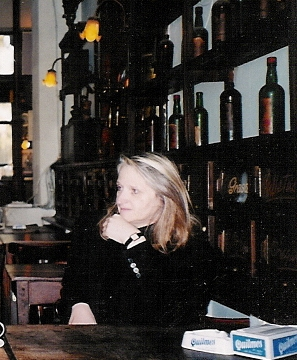
The Argentine playwright Diana Raznovich in 1998.

Diana Raznovich (born 1945) is an Argentine playwright and cartoonist. Her work in both mediums is comedic in tone and deals with feminism, sexuality, and Argentina's military dictatorship.

== Early life and education ==
Diana Raznovich was born in Buenos Aires in 1945, the oldest of three children. Her grandparents were European Jewish immigrants to the country from the Russian Empire and Vienna.

She studied literature at the University of Buenos Aires, where she was chosen as one of the students who would read to professor Jorge Luis Borges, who had gone blind by that time.

== Career ==
=== Theater ===
Raznovich's first play, Buscapiés, won a theater contest in 1967, jumpstarting her career when she was only 22 years old. After she wrote several more plays in the late 1960s and early 1970s, her career was disrupted by political violence and repression. Her husband Ernesto Clusellas was disappeared in 1974 during the escalating political persecution ahead of Argentina's Dirty War. He had been actively involved in the resistance movement and, unbeknownst to Raznovich, had stored an armory of weapons in their apartment.

Raznovich self-exiled the following year amid threats from the armed forces. She settled in Spain, where she taught playwriting at the Centro de Estudios Teatrales in Madrid and continued to write her own plays.

In 1981, she visited Argentina from exile to participate in the Teatro Abierto festival, a grouping of one-act plays in defiance of the military dictatorship's restrictions on expression. The military burned down the theater hosting the festival the night her play, Desconcierto, was presented.

She returned to Argentina after the fall of the dictatorship in 1983, but she moved back to Spain from 1988 until 1993. She then settled again in Argentina until 2000, when she returned once again to Spain. Her plays were performed in various languages on both sides of the Atlantic throughout this period, notably Jardin de otoño (1983), Casa Matriz (1991), De atrás para adelante (1993), and De la cintura para abajo (1999).

In 1992, Raznovich received a Guggenheim Fellowship to continue her work as a playwright. In 2002, she published a bilingual collection of four of her plays, titled Defiant Acts/Actos Desafiantes.

=== Cartoons ===
Raznovich is also a cartoonist. Her early humorous illustrations were tied to her involvement in the Argentine feminist movement, as she contributed cartoons to the women's and LGBT rights-centered magazine Alfonsina in the 1980s. Her cartooning is based in the concept that women's humor is inherently political, as explained in her "Manifesto 2000 of Feminine Humor," and she has tackled such serious subjects as gender-based violence.

Since 2012 she has published the cartoon Donatela on the back page of the Argentine newspaper Clarín. She has also published collections of her cartoons, including Mujeres pluscuamperfectas in 2010 and Divinas y Chamuscadas in 2011.

In 2022, her work was the subject of a censorship campaign by a group of Spanish judges who took offense at her depiction of a judge's flippant reaction to spousal abuse, leading to the piece's removal from an exhibit on the Balearic Islands. The artist condemned her critics for their "disproportionate" reaction and asked for her cartoon to be reinstated in the exhibit.

=== Other work ===
Raznovich has also written poetry and novels, including Para que se cumplan todos tus deseos in 1989, though she primarily works in plays. She also worked as a screenwriter for the telenovela Bárbara Narváez in the 1980s.

== Personal life ==
Raznovich's first husband, Ernesto Clusellas, disappeared like so many others during the Dirty War. She later learned that he had been assassinated in 1978.

She subsequently married the theater director Hugo Urquijo, who directed her plays Desconcierto and Jardín de otoño, but the couple divorced in 1983.

Raznovich is bisexual, and much of her work deals with gender and sexuality. Some of her work is also informed by her Jewish heritage, and she has studied Kabbalah as an adult.

== Selected works ==
=== Plays ===
- Buscapiés, 1968.
- Plaza hay una sola, 1969.
- El guardagente, 1970.
- Contratiempo, 1971.
- Efectos personales, 1975.
- Jardín de otoño, 1977.
- El desconcierto, 1981.
- Objetos perdidos, 1988.
- Casa Matriz, 1988.
- La madre posmoderna, 1993.
- De atrás para adelante, 1993.
- De la cintura para abajo, 1999.
- El cuerpo efímero: una muerte de lujo, 2007.

=== Poetry ===
- Tiempo de amar, 1960.
- Caminata en tu sombra, 1964.

=== Novels ===
- Para que se cumplan todos tus deseos, 1989.
- Mater erótica, 1991.

=== Cartoon collections ===
- Cables pelados, 1987.
- Sopa de Lunares, 2008.
- Mujeres Pluscuamperfectas, 2010.
- Divinas y Chamuscadas, 2011.
