= Violante Atabalipa Ximenes de Bivar e Vellasco =

- Born: December 1, 1817; São Salvador da Bahia, Brazil
- Died: May 25, 1875 (aged 57); Rio de Janeiro, Brazil
- Occupations: Writer, media proprietor
- Known for: Women's rights

Violante Atabalipa Ximenes de Bivar e Vellasco (December 1, 1817 – May 25, 1875) was a Brazilian feminist, writer and newspaper owner.

== Biography ==
Vellasco was born on December 1, 1817, in São Salvador da Bahia. As a young child, she was provided a good education and lived with her mother and grandfather while her father was in Rio de Janeiro. The family eventually joined her father in Rio de Janeiro. In 1845, Vellasco married a lieutenant, João Antonio Boaventura, who died only a few years after they were married. Vellasco was wealthy and had an independent income and was able to finance her own work. She was against women's exclusion from higher education in Brazil.

Vellasco served as the editor and patron of O Jornal das Senhoras, a feminist magazine created in 1852 and first edited by Joana Paula Manso de Noronha. O Jornal das Senhoras covered the positive qualities of women, advocated for women's education and covered other topics of interest to women. Another editor of the journal, with Vellasco, was Gervasia Nunenzia Pires dos Santos. The journal continued until December 1855. She also translated literary works. She later published another journal, O Domingo, in 1874, which defended and discussed the rights of women in Brazil.

On May 25, 1875, Vellasco died in Rio de Janeiro.

Vellasco was a member of the Imperial Council in Brazil and the founder and director of the Brazilian Dramatic Conservatory in Rio de Janeiro.
