= Lenore Tawney =

American artist (1907–2007)

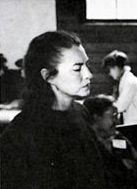
- Lenore Tawney, 1959
- Born: Leonora Agnes Gallagher; May 10, 1907; Lorain, Ohio
- Died: September 24, 2007 (aged 100); New York, New York
- Known for: Fiber art, collage, assemblage, drawing
- Movement: Minimalism
- Spouse: George Tawney (m. 1941; died in 1943)
- Website: lenoretawney.org

Lenore Tawney (born Leonora Agnes Gallagher; May 10, 1907 – September 24, 2007) was an American artist working in fiber art, collage, assemblage, and drawing. She is considered to be a groundbreaking artist for the elevation of craft processes to fine art status, two communities which were previously mutually exclusive. Tawney was born and raised in an Irish-American family in Lorain, Ohio near Cleveland and later moved to Chicago to start her career. In the 1940s and 50s, she studied art at several different institutions and perfected her craft as a weaver. In 1957, she moved to New York where she maintained a highly successful career into the 1960s. In the 1970s Tawney focused increasingly on her spirituality, but continued to make work until her death.

== Early life and education ==
Tawney was one of five children born in Lorain, Ohio to Irish mother Sarah Jennings and Irish-American father William Gallagher. In 1927, she left home at age 20 to move to Chicago, where she worked as a proofreader for a publisher of court opinions. She worked hard and eventually became head of the department. Tawney worked in Chicago for 15 years while taking night courses at the Art Institute of Chicago (now School of the Art Institute of Chicago).

While living in Chicago, she met George Tawney, a young psychologist, through friends. In 1941 the two married, but 18 months later George died suddenly. His untimely death provided her with the means to pursue her creative work without financial constraints. After he passed, she moved to Urbana, Illinois to be near his family and enrolled at the University of Illinois to study art therapy from 1943-1945. Tawney's introduction to the tenets of the German Bauhaus school and the artistic avant-garde began in 1946 when she attended László Moholy-Nagy's Chicago Institute of Design. There she studied with cubist sculptor Alexander Archipenko and abstract expressionist painter Emerson Woelffer, among others, and in 1949, she studied weaving with Bauhaus alumna Marli Ehrman. While studying with Alexander Archipenko, she was invited to work and study at his studio in Woodstock, New York in the summer of 1947. There she worked in clay creating abstract, figurative forms. However, Tawney found the work all-consuming and exhausting and wasn't ready to commit fully to the work of being an artist. She returned to Chicago and destroyed most of her work from this period, which she felt was derivative and not true to her own artistic vision.

== Career ==
=== 1948-1956 ===
At the Chicago Institute of Design and in her previous studies, Tawney focused in the areas of sculpture and drawing. In 1948, Tawney bought her first loom, at age 41 and began learning how to weave. From 1949 to 1951, Tawney lived in Paris and traveled extensively throughout North Africa and Europe. She returned to the United States and in 1954 she studied with the Finnish weaver Martta Taipale at Penland School of Crafts in North Carolina. Soon after, she began experimenting with new fiber techniques and color palettes in her weaving and creating her own designs. In 1955, she started creating her signature open-warp weavings that featured plain weave, laid-in designs, and large areas of unwoven warp, which utilized negative space as a visual element. A year later, her work was part of the exhibition Craftsmanship in a Changing World at the Museum of Contemporary Crafts (now the Museum of Arts and Design) in New York. This was the first time she was involved in a show at an important national institution alongside other visionaries in contemporary fiber art.

Because of her unorthodox weaving methods, Tawney was spurned by both the craft and art worlds, but her distinct style attracted many devoted admirers. Beginning in 1955, Tawney's work became more widely known and consequently, more widely criticized and discussed. In 1957, her friend Margo Hoff wrote the first critical assessment of her work in an article titled, Lenore Tawney: the warp is her canvas for the magazine Craft Horizons. In this article, Tawney reflected that painters liked her work, whereas weavers tended to reject it. Tawney's open-warp weavings were controversial and disrupted longstanding historical traditions and techniques in weaving. Her disruptions signified the beginning of an era of change in the fiber world.

=== 1957-1969 ===
In November 1957, Tawney demonstrated her commitment to her work and career by moving to New York City, the center of the modern art world. She settled in the Coenties Slip, where there was an established colony of well-known modern artists like Ellsworth Kelly, Robert Indiana, Agnes Martin and Jack Youngerman. The artist would develop a close friendship and artistic relationship with Agnes Martin, who would write the essay for Tawney's first solo exhibition at the Staten Island Museum. After eight months, Tawney began leasing three floors of a former sailmaker's loft which had a top floor with a high cathedral ceiling to accommodate her growing textile pieces.

In 1961, Tawney's first solo exhibition, which included forty weavings she had produced since 1955, opened at the Staten Island Museum. This exhibition was the first public display of the artist's new open-warp hangings. In 1961, Tawney studied the Peruvian gauze weave technique with fiber artist Lili Blumenau and pioneered an "open reed" for her loom in order to produce more mutable woven forms. The open reed allowed for warps to be looser and easily manipulated by hand to accommodate Tawney's new visions. Her early tapestries combined traditional with experimental, using the Peruvian gauze weave technique and inlayed colorful yarns to create a painterly effect that appeared to float in space. During this same time, Tawney began working on her well-known Woven Forms series. The Woven Forms were monumental hanging weavings, displayed away from the wall and incorporating negative space. These totem-like sculptural weavings abandoned the rectangular format of traditional tapestries and sometimes included found objects such as feathers and shells. While working on this series, Tawney's color palette transitioned to blacks, whites, and neutrals. The pieces in the Woven Forms series were increasingly large, with the tallest measuring 27 feet tall. Two years later, in 1963, the exhibition Woven Forms at the Museum of Contemporary Crafts (now the Museum of Arts and Design) was organized around her series of the same name. This was the first major exhibition to display the range of new experimentation happening in the fiber discipline and 22 of the 43 pieces were Tawney's.

From 1964-1965 the artist began creating work in drawing, collage, and assemblage. In the Summer of 1964, Tawney saw a Jacquard loom when she visited a label factory in New Jersey. She was interested in how the threads above the loom moved and this experience inspired a series of ink drawings on graph paper. This eight-piece series would later inspire the 1990s series, Drawings in Air, a three dimensional study of lines as threads in space. Tawney suspends threads in space with the help of plexiglass and wood framing. The Drawings in Air series used plexiglass boxes with holes drilled in them to support geometric "drawing" with thread. The threads were again based on the jacquard loom warp tie up that had first caught her eye in 1964.

In 1965, Tawney began to create work in collage and assemblage. Tawney's collages ranged from postcards, books, three-dimensional drawer cases, and completely fabricated chairs. She also experimented with applying collage to woven works. There is overlap between her collage and assemblage pieces since her assemblage often includes collage. The physical elements Tawney collaged with included rare book pages in different languages, photographs, cutouts from newspapers and magazines, cosmological charts, tantric symbols, illustrations from art history books and nature guides, musical scores, and her own drawing and handwriting. Her collages contained a variety of messages from secret to humorous.

An example of the artist's prolific collage work are the postcard collages she sent to family and friends. She began creating postcard collages in the 1960's when she was moving studios frequently and traveling internationally. Some of her collages were created and sent during her travels, as evidenced by international stamps. These small collages on standard sized postcards are an early example of mail art. The artist enjoyed how the application of the postmark dated the work and offered a random addition to the piece. Many examples of these postcard collages are included in the archival collections of artists like Toshiko Takaezu, Maryette Charlton, and Lillian Kiesler in the Archives of American Art.

Tawney made assemblages in a variety of forms from sculptures to box constructions, and chests. The artist's mixed media assemblages incorporate small found objects including feathers, twigs, pebbles, string, bones, wood, and eggshells. These delicate, poetic pieces were often spiritual in nature, containing elusive messages about finding inner peace and the fragility of life. She continued to collect and assemble these pieces until her death in 2007. Although Tawney is known primarily for her contributions to fiber art, her collage and assemblage portfolios are extensive and impressive. Tawney's postcard collages and assemblage constructions filled up two entire exhibitions without textile pieces at the Willard Gallery in 1967 and 1970.

=== 1970-2007 ===
In the 1970s, interest in contemporary fiber artwork waned and Tawney's career lost some of its momentum. During this period, the artist became increasingly dedicated to her spirituality and the rate that she was previously producing work declined. However, she continued to create collages and assemblages and her weaving evolved and progressed. Her weavings from the mid seventies were large scale, monochromatic, and frequently had slits. In stark contrast to her earlier open-warp works, these pieces were tightly woven and dense. In her work in the 1970's, the circle within a square was a device that was repeated as a symbol of unity. The cross was also a repeated symbol in her work that represented the meeting of opposites.

In 1977, Tawney created the first piece in her monumental Clouds series. The artist was commissioned to create a piece for the Federal Building in Santa Rosa, California. There was currently a drought in California and Tawney was inspired to make a cloud. The cloud was made of a canvas support that had thousands of linen threads tied and cascading down into space. The canvas was then attached to a grid structure above. This first piece, "Cloud Series IV" was completed and dedicated in 1978. Tawney continued to create works in this series until 1983. The cloud series were often grand public commissions, but were also sometimes displayed in smaller gallery spaces.

From the late 1950s up until her death in 2007, Tawney lived and worked mainly in New York City, traveling abroad frequently. In her 90's, her vision began to gradually fail, but she continued to make art with the aid of an assistant. In 1989, the artist established the Lenore G. Tawney Foundation, which she endowed her artistic and financial resources to. She created the foundation with the goals of making the visual arts more accessible and to create opportunities for emerging artists. The Lenore G. Tawney Foundation is represented by the gallery, Alison Jacques. "The first hundred years", she said with a smile on her hundredth birthday, "were the hardest."

Crow Woman by Lenore Tawney (1993), Honolulu Museum of Art

=== Legacy ===
Tawney's work was included in the 2021 exhibition Women in Abstraction at the Centre Pompidou. Her work was also included in the exhibition Making Knowing: Craft in Art, 1950–2019 at the Whitney Museum of American Art from 2019 through 2022. Her work was included in the 2024 exhibition Making Their Mark: Works from the Shah Garg Collection at the Berkeley Art Museum and Pacific Film Archive (BAMPFA).

== Public collections ==
- Art Institute of Chicago, Chicago, IL
- Brooklyn Museum of Art, Brooklyn, NY
- Cleveland Museum of Art, Cleveland, OH
- Cooper Hewitt, National Design Museum, Smithsonian Institution, New York, NY
- Honolulu Museum of Art, Honolulu, HI
- Metropolitan Museum of Art, New York, NY
- Minneapolis Institute of Arts, Minneapolis, MN
- Musée des Arts Decoratifs de Montréal, Montréal, Canada
- Museum Bellerive, Museum für Gestaltung, Zürich, Switzerland
- Museum of Arts and Design, New York, NY
- Museum of Modern Art, New York, NY
- Philadelphia Museum of Art, Philadelphia, PA
- Renwick Gallery of the National Museum of American Art, Smithsonian Institution, Washington, D.C.
- Stedelijk Museum, Amsterdam, Netherlands
- Tang Museum, Saratoga Springs, NY
- Wadsworth Atheneum, Hartford, CT
- Whitney Museum of American Art, New York, NY

== Public commissions ==
- 1957, North Shore Shopping Center, Marshall Fields and Company, Chicago, IL.
- Nativity in Nature, 1960, Chapel of the Inter-Church Center, New York, NY.
- Ark Veil, 1963, Congregation Solel, Highlands Park, IL.
- Cloud Series IV, 1978, Santa Rosa Federal Building, Santa Rosa, CA.
- Cloud Series VI, 1981, Frank J. Lausche State Office Building, Cleveland, OH.
- Cloud Series VII, 1983, Western Connecticut State University, Danbury, CT.
