= La Voz de la Mujer =

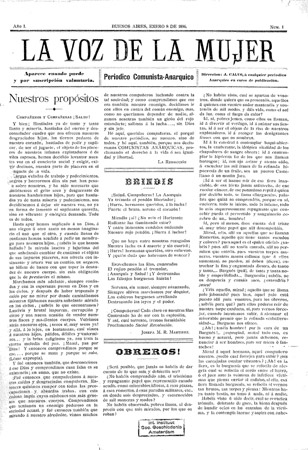
- Founded: 1896
- Political alignment: Anarchist communism, feminism
- Language: Spanish
- Ceased publication: 1899
- City: Buenos Aires (1896–1897), Rosario (1899)
- Country: Argentina
- Circulation: 1,000 to 5,000 copies

La Voz de la Mujer (Spanish: The Voice of the Woman) was the first Anarcha-feminist and feminist newspaper in Argentina. It was published in Buenos Aires from 1896 to 1897 and in Rosario in 1899.

In addition to proposing an anarchist feminism far removed from the reformist feminism of the period, the newspaper defended the ideals of anarchist communism. The newspaper's motto was "Ni dios, ni patrón, ni marido" ("Neither god, nor boss, nor husband"). It was first published in Buenos Aires between 1896 and 1897. In 1899, there is documentation that indicates it was published in Rosario, under the direction of Virginia Bolten, although no copies have been found. In the 1910s, there is evidence of the intent to re-publish the newspaper in Montevideo, but the project was unsuccessful.

== History ==
Each issue of La Voz de la Mujer was four pages long and had a circulation of 1,000 to 2,000 copies, in addition to its semiclandestine distribution advocated by the publishers. The writers were in contact with famous anarchists such as Louise Michel and Emma Goldman. The first issue was released on 8 January 1896. Economic difficulties led to the end of the project, and the final issue was released on 1 January 1897.

The newspaper called for women to rebel against male oppression, but without abandoning the proletariat struggle. It was critical of all forms of authority: in religion, employment, the state and the family. The ultimate proposal was the establishment of anarchist communism.

The institution of marriage was one of the main targets of the editors, who regarded women as the oppressed link in the chain of exploitation. They defended the idea of free love, which they described as one which permits "the union to end when the love ends."

Anarchist historian Max Nettlau saved most issues of the newspaper, and they can be found at the International Institute of Social History in Amsterdam.

== Bibliography ==
- Molyneux, Maxine (2001). "'No God, No Boss, No Husband!': Anarchist Feminism in Nineteenth-Century Argentina". Women's movements in international perspective: Latin America and beyond. Palgrave MacMillan. pp. 13–37. doi:10.1057/9780230286382. ISBN 978-0-230-28638-2. LCCN 00062707.
