= Rosa Guerra =

Argentine educator, journalist and writer

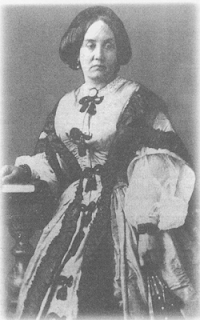
Rosa Guerra

Rosa Guerra (1834 – August 18, 1864) was an Argentine educator, journalist and writer. She was a pioneering woman in Argentine literature. Guerra defended the idea that women should not be confined to household duties, but were born to be educated. She is most known for her rendition of Lucia Miranda.

== Biography ==
Rosa Guerra was born in Buenos Aires, 1834. For her schooling, she attended an all girls school. Like most women at the time, Guerra, became a teacher to make money. Later on in her education career she advanced to becoming a principal of a school in Buenos Aires. She founded two newspapers, La Camelia, dedicated to spreading ideas associated with equality between the sexes, and La Educación a religious, poetic and literary newspaper. Guerra taught her readers about the hardships of being a woman in a heavily male profession. Due to various European translations, it was normal for Argentine writers to have different sign names. Guerra would sometimes use the name "Cecilia" as her sign on the translations. She also affiliated with the newspapers La Nación Argentina, El Nacional, and La Tribuna. She published the novel Lucía Miranda on the subject of the captive; La Camelia; and a drama in verse, Clemencia. Posthumously, her book of poems, Desahogos del corazón (Relief from the heart), was published. Her audiences were not only adults, but also children. Her children's books like, Julia and Her Education, focused on the challenges of becoming educated as a female. On August 18, 1864 Rosa Guerra died from illness in Buenos Aires at age 30. Her novels are read today to call attention to Latin American female writers during the 1800s.

== La Camelia ==
Guerra began her career as a journalist in 1852 at age 18 with La Camelia. There is no coincidence that 1852 is also the same year that Juan Manuel de Rosas was removed from power in Buenos Aires. Rosas ran a dictatorship that greatly limited the press. When he was removed, there were many female writers who were motivated to restart their careers.

La Camelia began publication on April 11, 1852, and printed its last issue on May 11, 1852, printing fourteen editions. The critic Néstor Tomás Auza states, however, that there were actually 31 issues. The newspaper was written mostly by women, and was financed by subscription. At first, Guerra denied her participation in the project, but later, she acknowledged being its founder. The newspaper had the slogan "Liberty, not license. Equality between the sexes ". La Camelia was one the first newspapers to openly raise the need for women to have access to education. Guerra believed that if women obtained the same education as men, women would be able to better prepare their children for the world. The newspaper argued that it was not right that European women had access to education and Argentine women did not. La Camelia focused on how essential it was for women to be a part of rebuilding the morale of the nation. Women understood politics and could strengthen the advancements of Argentina. La Camelia struggled to gain support, because of the Catholic church. The Catholic Church did not believe that women should have advanced education and jobs in society, besides the job of being a mother.

== Lucia Miranda ==
The novel Lucía Miranda is set in the 1500s. Lucia Miranda deals with the subject of a captive, a myth that appeared for the first time recounted by Ruy Díaz de Guzmán, and that was also addressed by Eduarda Mansilla in her homonymous novel. There was a renowned fear of white women being held captive by indigenous Argentine people. Rosa Guerra initially wrote the novel for a newly married couple in 1860. Guerra's novel tells the story of Lucía Miranda, the wife of a Spaniard who accompanies Sebastián Gaboto on his expedition through the Río de la Plata and is captured by the Amerindians in the destruction of Fort Sancti Spiritus. The novel presents a model of a rebellious Christian woman. In Guerra's version, she focused on the physical appearance of Lucia in contrast Chief Mangora. This led some people to believe she was promoting intimate relationships between white woman and indigenous people. Guerra calls attention to the idea that if Lucia had more education, she would have been more cautious around Chief Mangora.
