= Virginia Bolten =

Argentine anarchist (1870–1960)

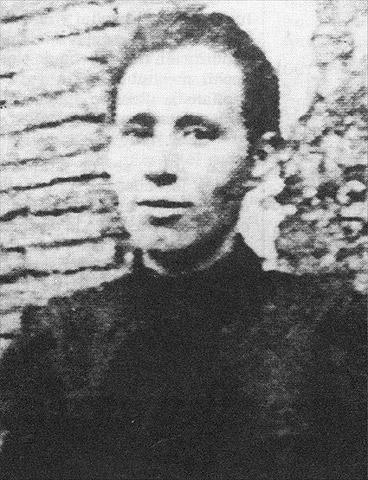
- Bolten c. 1902
- Born: 26 December 1870; San Luis, Argentina
- Died: 1960 (aged 89–90); Montevideo, Uruguay
- Occupations: Journalist, activist
- Organization: Argentine Regional Workers' Federation
- Notable work: La Voz de la Mujer (1896–1897); La Nueva Senda (1909–1910)
- Movement: Anarchist feminism

Virginia Bolten (1870–1960) was an Argentine journalist and anarchist feminist activist. An anarchist agitator from an early age, she became a leading figure among the working women of Rosario, organising for the Argentine Regional Workers' Federation (FORA) and leading the first women's strike in the country's history. After being recruited into the anarchist movement in Buenos Aires by the Italian anarchist Pietro Gori, she joined some of the country's first anarchist women's organisations and established one of the world's first anarchist feminist periodicals: La Voz de la Mujer.

After years of agitation in Argentina, under the 1902 Law of Residence, she was deported to Uruguay. There she continued her feminist activism, establishing the periodical La Nueva Senda and the radical feminist association Emancipación. Following sustained conflict with socialist feminists, the anarchist feminist movement in Uruguay fell into obscurity. Bolten lived the rest of her life in Montevideo, occasionally speaking at demonstrations, until her death in 1960.

== Biography ==
Virginia Bolten was born in 1870 in San Luis, Argentina, the daughter of a German liberal who had been exiled from Europe. After her parents divorced, while she was still a teenager, she moved out to the industrial city of Rosario and got a job as a shoemaker. She was later employed in the Argentine Sugar Refinery, but was arrested after being caught distributing anarchist propaganda to the women working there.

=== In the Argentine anarchist movement ===
Part of the second generation of anarchist feminists, Bolten quickly developed a reputation as a "great orator" and an "indefatigable organiser", capable of drawing in large crowds to see her speak. Together with Juana Rouco Buela and María Collazo, Bolten became one of the few leading women in the Argentine anarchist movement. As a member of the Argentine Regional Workers' Federation (FORA), she travelled throughout the country on speaking tours, encouraging women to become involved in anarchist politics. As an anarchist feminist, she was disinterested in the liberal and socialist feminists' calls for universal suffrage, advocating instead for the revolutionary abolition of the existing system rather than incremental reforms to it.

In 1889, Bolten led Argentina's first women's strike, carried out by seamstresses in Rosario. The strike was successful, resulting in the workers winning a 20% salary increase. The following year, she led the city's International Workers' Day demonstrations with a black flag. Her activism drew the attention of the Italian anarchist Pietro Gori, who recruited Bolten into the anarchist movement in Buenos Aires. Inspired by the feminist writings of the Catalan anarchist Teresa Mañé, printed by Errico Malatesta's newspaper La Questione Sociale, by 1895, the first anarchist women's groups were being established in Argentina. These organisations produced a new generation of radical feminists, among whom Bolten became especially active. With Gori's help, Bolten founded one of the world's first anarchist feminist publications, La Voz de la Mujer (English: The Women's Voice). With Bolten as one of its editors, the newspaper published nine issues from 8 January 1896 until 1 January 1897; with Bolten later reviving it in Rosario in 1901. Bolten and Gori also established an anarchist-socialist organisation which was dedicated to abolishing mores and traditions that they found authoritarian, including the institution of marriage.

In order to suppress the rising anarchist movement, in 1902, the Argentine government passed the "Law of Residence", which allowed the deportation of immigrants involved in anarchist activism. Bolten was punished under this law on several occasions: in 1903, Bolten was arrested for distributing anarchist propaganda in Rosario; and in 1904, again for organising a women's strike committee in the Buenos Aires fruit market. In January 1905, after receiving news of the Bloody Sunday massacre in the Russian Empire's capital of Saint Petersburg, Bolten publicly denounced the Tsarist autocracy and directly compared its actions to those of the Argentine government.

=== Life in Uruguay ===
In 1907, after participating in a tenants' strike in the Argentine capital, Bolten was deported to Uruguay under the Law of Residence. She was joined there by her long-term partner, the anarchist union leader Manuel Manrique, along with her fellow deported anarchist feminist organisers: Juana Rouco Buela and María Collazo. Undeterred, Bolten and her colleagues continued their anarchist feminist activism in the Uruguayan capital of Montevideo. In 1909, Bolten, Rouco Buela and Collazo established the anarchist feminist newspaper La Nueva Senda (English: The New Path), but hostilities from other Uruguayan anarchists resulted in the publication ceasing the following year.

By this time, anarchist feminism was already being overtaken in South America by socialist and liberal forms of feminism. In May 1910, a Pan-American Federation was established in Buenos Aires by a Women's Congress, with the aim of working towards improving women's rights while also upholding traditional gender roles. But the Federation delayed in establishing a Uruguayan section, stalled by its hopes for reform from the new liberal President José Batlle y Ordóñez. In April 1911, radical feminists in Montevideo established the Asociación Femenina "Emancipación" (English: "Emancipation" Women's Association), which took a distinctly anti-clerical position on women's liberation.

The Federation attempted to encourage the members of Emancipación to affiliate with it, but differences between the two organisations over the Federation's liberal platform were quickly pronounced by the anarchists Virginia Bolten and María Collazo. Bolten's radical speeches discouraged affiliation with the Federation, with the Association ultimately voting against it. Immediately after the vote, Emancipación agreed on anarchist-inspired statutes that upheld women's education and self-defense, while also advocating for integration with the progressive movement across gender lines. In contrast to the middle-class suffragism of the liberal feminists, Emancipación focused on organising working women such as seamstresses and telephone operators.

By 1913, the Association was splintering into factions: the anarchists, led by Bolten; and the members of the newly-established Socialist Party of Uruguay, led by María Casal y Canda. In June of that year, the Socialist Party's newspaper published a hit piece against Bolten, which accused her of supporting the progressive Batlle government. By the following year, a sustained period of socialist attacks against the anarchists effectively suppressed their influence over the workers' and women's movements, with Marxism becoming the dominant force in Uruguayan radical feminism and anarchist women's organisations falling into obscurity.

In 1923, Bolten helped to establish the Centro Internacional de Estudios Sociales (English: International Centre of Social Studies). Later in her life, Bolten continued to speak at demonstrations on International Workers' Day and International Women's Day, before her death in 1960.

== Legacy ==
=== Commemorations ===
The Parque Virginia Bolten (Virginia Bolten Park) in Puerto Madero, Buenos Aires, is named in her honor. In the city of Rosario, a plaque commemorating her was unveiled by the city's mayor Mónica Fein and the provincial governor Miguel Lifschitz to mark International Women's Day. On 7 March 2018, the Municipal Council of Santa Fe established the Premio Virginia Bolten a la labor periodística con perspectiva de género (English: Virginia Bolten Award for Gender-Sensitive Journalism).

=== Film ===
In 2007, the government of San Luis Province in Argentina decided to fund a film honoring Virginia Bolten. The film focuses mainly on Bolten's life, anarchist feminism and the social conditions, which led to the publication of La Voz de la Mujer. It is titled No god, no master, no husband (Spanish: Ni dios, ni patrón, ni marido) after one of the newspaper's mottos.

== Bibliography ==
- Carlson, Marifran (1988). "Feminism and Socialism". Feminismo!: The Woman's Movement in Argentina From Its Beginnings to Eva Perón. Academy Chicago Publishers. pp. 121–138. ISBN 0-89733-152-4. LCCN 85-18567.
- Cohn, Jesse (2009). "Anarchism and Gender". In Ness, Immanuel (ed.). The International Encyclopedia of Revolution and Protest. Wiley. pp. 1–5. doi:10.1002/9781405198073.wbierp0055. ISBN 9781405198073.
- Ehrick, Christine (2005). "The First Feminisms: State Building and Women's Organizing, 1880s-1915". The Shield of the Weak: Feminism and the State in Uruguay, 1903-1933. UNM Press. pp. 33–68. ISBN 0-8263-3468-7. LCCN 2005002484.
- Ehrick, Christine (2017). "Women, Politics, and Media in Uruguay, 1900–1950". Oxford Research Encyclopedia of Latin American History. doi:10.1093/acrefore/9780199366439.013.303. ISBN 9780199366439.
- de Laforcade, Geoffroy (2010). "Straddling the Nation and the Working World: Anarchism and Syndicalism on the Docks and Rivers of Argentina, 1900–1930". In Hirsch, Steven J.; van der Walt, Lucien (eds.). Anarchism and Syndicalism in the Colonial and Postcolonial World, 1870–1940. Studies in Global Social History. Vol. 6. Leiden: Brill. pp. 321–362. ISBN 9789004188495. OCLC 868808983.
- Molyneux, Maxine (2001). "'No God, No Boss, No Husband!' Anarchist Feminism in Nineteenth-Century Argentina". Women's Movements in International Perspective: Latin America and Beyond. Palgrave MacMillan. pp. 13–37. doi:10.1057/9780230286382_2. ISBN 978-0-333-78677-2. LCCN 00-062707.
- Moya, José (2002). "Italians in Buenos Aires's Anarchist Movement: Gender Ideology and Women's Participation, 1890-1910". In Gabaccia, Donna; Iacovetta, Franca (eds.). Women, Gender and Transnational Lives: Italian Workers of the World. University of Toronto Press. pp. 189–216. ISBN 978-0-8020-8462-0.
- Moya, José (2004). "The Positive Side of Stereotypes: Jewish Anarchists in Early-twentieth-Century Buenos Aires". Jewish History. 18 (1): 19–48. doi:10.1023/B:JEHI.0000005735.80946.27. S2CID 144315538.
- Tarcus, Horacio (2009). "Bolten, Virginia (ca. 1870–ca. 1960)". In Ness, Immanuel (ed.). The International Encyclopedia of Revolution and Protest. Wiley. p. 1. doi:10.1002/9781405198073.wbierp1764. ISBN 9781405198073.
