= Juana Rouco Buela =

Spanish-Argentine laundress, anarcha-feminist organizer, public speaker and advocate

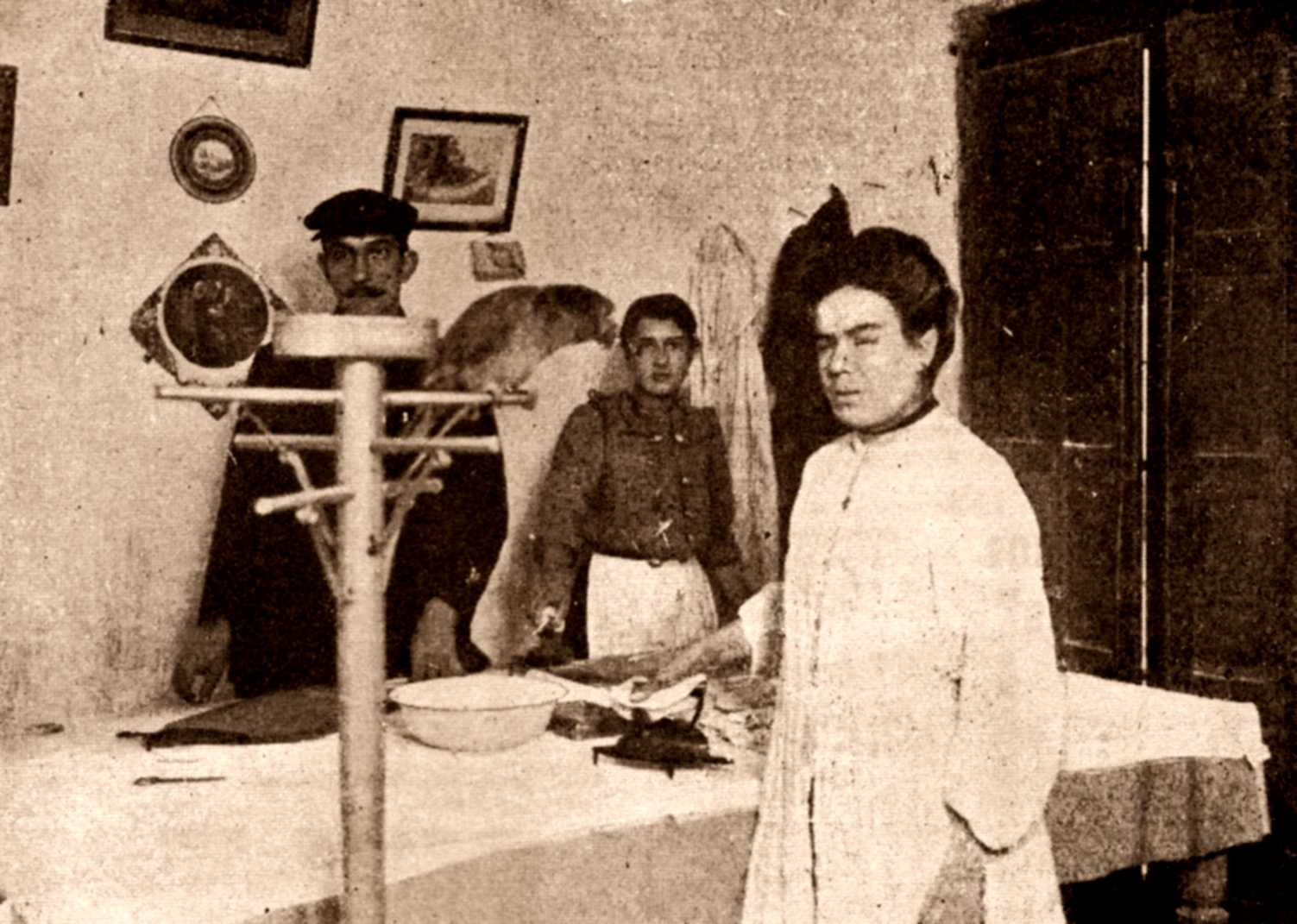
Juana Rouco Buela

Juana Rouco Buela (Madrid, 1889 – Buenos Aires, 1969) was a Spanish-Argentine laundress, anarcha-feminist organizer, public speaker, and advocate of women's political militancy. She was committed to the emancipation of women and was a central figure of Argentine anarcho-syndicalism. She was one of the leading Argentine female trade unionists and one of the best public speakers. She also ran a book stand, selling pamphlets and literature pertaining to socialism, anarchism and such other works on political economy and other questions which interested the working people of Buenos Aires.

Born into a working-class family, Rouco Buela immigrated to Argentina at the age of 11, and taught herself how to read and write. She participated in the 1904 May Day rally. In 1907, she cofounded Centro Femenino Anarquista with Virginia Bolten, Teresa Caporaletti, Elisa Leotar, María Reyes, Violeta Garcia, Marta Newelstein, and Maria Collazo. In the same year, she was deported back to Spain; there she met with Federica Montseny, who had a significant influence over Rouco Buela. She had at least one child, a daughter, Poema, born in December 1923. In 1964 she wrote an autobiography entitled Historia de un ideal. Rouco Buela died on 31 October 1969 of wounds sustained after being hit by a pickup truck several months before.

== Bibliography ==
- Baer, James A. (30 March 2015). Anarchist Immigrants in Spain and Argentina. University of Illinois Press. ISBN 978-0-252-09697-6.
- Carlson, Marifran (1 August 2005). ¡Feminismo!: The Woman's Movement in Argentina. Chicago Review Press. ISBN 978-1-61373-337-0.
- Guzzo, Cristina (2003). Las anarquistas rioplatenses, 1890-1990. Editorial Orbis Press. ISBN 978-1-931139-12-0.
- Tarcus, Horacio, "Diccionario Biográfico de la Izquierda Argentina", Buenos Aires, Emecé, 2007.
