= María Elena Oddone =

Argentine women's rights activist

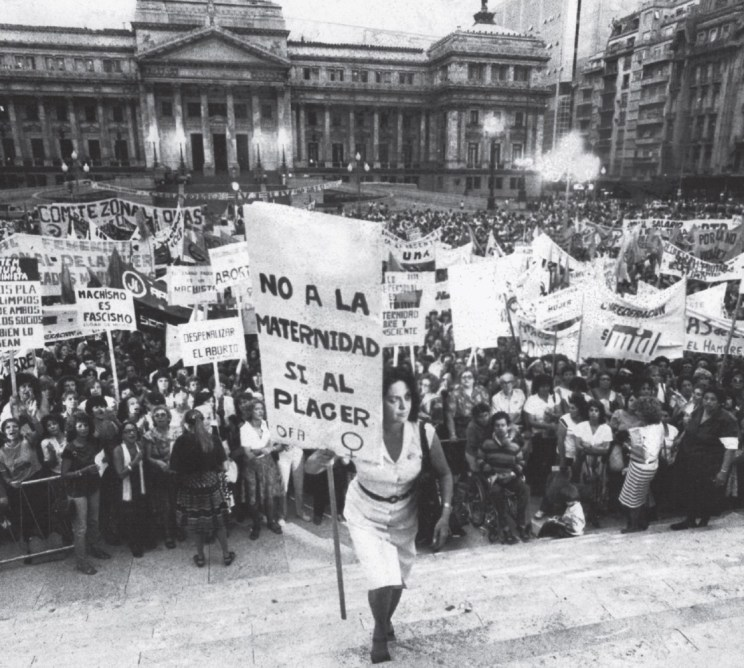
- At the Monument of the Two Congresses on International Women's Day, 1984
- Occupations: Writer, activist

María Elena Oddone is an Argentine women's rights activist and writer. A prominent figure of second-wave feminism in her country, she was the founder of one of its first feminist organizations, the Women's Liberation Movement (MLF), as well as the Argentine Feminist Organization (OFA) and the Court of Violence Against Women. She was director of Persona magazine from September 1974 to December 1986. She is the author of La pasión por la libertad: memorias de una feminista (The Passion for Freedom: Memoirs of a Feminist).

== Biography ==
María Elena Oddone was a teacher by profession, and led a comfortable life as a housewife from Barrio Norte, married to a soldier. At age 42, she discovered feminism through the works of authors such as Simone de Beauvoir and Victoria Ocampo. She broke up with her husband and devoted herself to feminist activism.

She appeared on radio and television programs, and wrote articles in magazines such as La Opinión and Claudia. In the latter, she published criticism of a joke from the magazine itself about some American feminists. As a consequence, in 1972, she decided to found the Feminist Liberation Movement (MLF), taking the American and European feminist movements as a model. Under the auspices of this collective, she also founded the magazine Persona, which was a pioneering publication of the Argentine organized feminist movement. As she stated, this name alluded to the identity traditionally denied to women. It published articles by feminists such as Kate Millett, Evelyn Reed, Susan Sontag, Juliet Mitchell, and Simone de Beauvoir. The MLF, in collaboration with the Argentine Feminist Union (UFA) created by María Luisa Bemberg and Gabriela Cristeller, and with middle-class urban activists, especially from Buenos Aires, carried out numerous activities to raise awareness and debate of women's issues. In 1976, the military government dissolved the organization, and Oddone fled Buenos Aires for a time.

In 1980, the government allowed political parties and associations to return to their premises, and Oddone resumed her public presence. She reformed the MLF under a new name – the Argentine Feminist Organization (OFA) – and relaunched Persona. Together with other activists, she fought for mothers to be granted the same rights as fathers in terms of parental authority over their children. To this end, she formed a commission made up of Irma Block, Victoria Mungo, Sara Torres, María Luisa Bemberg, Leonor Calvera, and others, which organized demonstrations and undertook a campaign to collect signatures. In 1983, with the aim of assisting victims of sexual crimes, she formed the Court of Violence Against Women, which denounced judges who let murderers and rapists of women go free.

On 8 March 1984, the first International Women's Day since the country's return to democracy, she publicly called for the legalization of abortion, carrying a sign with the slogan "No a la maternidad, sí al placer" (No to motherhood, yes to pleasure), which questioned the idea that the destiny of women is limited to raising children.

No one has to explain to us the three pillars on which female oppression is based: motherhood, sexuality, and domestic work.

In 1985, Oddone joined the Fighting Front for Women, but she was expelled due to disagreements with the organization. She also had to leave other groups such as the Women's Place, the Women's Multisectorial, and the Family Protection Association because she opposed the feminist movement's support of the Mothers of the Plaza de Mayo. She also opposed the Law of the Cohabitant that made it necessary to distribute a widow's pension between a wife and ex-wife. She was associated with gay and lesbian organizations such as the Sexual Policy Group (GPS) and the Homosexual Liberation Front (FLH). From 1989 to 1994, she wrote a column in the weekly El Informador Público, covering cases of sexist violence and complaints against the police and legal system.

In 2001, she published her autobiography, La pasión por la libertad: memorias de una feminista.
