= Juana Paula Manso =

Argentine writer

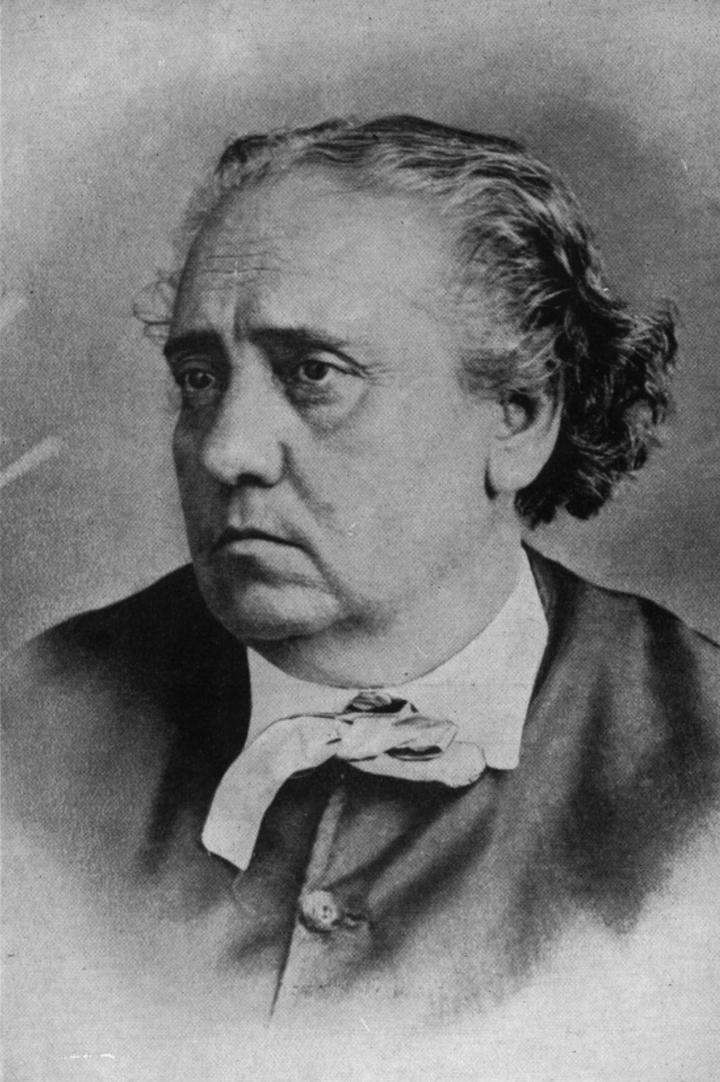
- Juana Paula Manso
- Born: June 26, 1819; Buenos Aires, Argentina
- Died: April 24, 1875 (aged 55); Buenos Aires, Argentina
- Other name: Juana (Paula) Manso de Noronha
- Occupation: Writer

Juana Paula Manso (June 26, 1819 – April 24, 1875) was an Argentine writer, translator, journalist, teacher and feminist who advocated for better educational reform and better educational accessibility for women.

== Biography ==
Juana Paula Manso, also known as Juana (Paula) Manso de Noronha, was born in Buenos Aires, Argentina on June 26, 1819. Coming from a liberal and progressive family, Manso's father, José Maria Manso, had a highly educated background and worked as an engineer and took great pride in his daughter's education and intelligence. The Manso family's liberal political ideologies soon caused trouble for them when the Rosas government came into power, and in 1840 Manso and the rest of her family were forced from their home in Buenos Aires and exiled to Montevideo, Uruguay (where she first published a few of her poems in a local newspaper, El Nacional, in 1841)—only to have to flee to Brazil in 1841; initially staying in Rio Grande do Sul, then settling more permanently in Rio de Janeiro.

In 1844, Manso married Francisco de Saá Noronha, a Portuguese violinist. Between 1846 and 1850, Manso and Noronha traveled across Brazil, the United States (whose education system would act as a model for many of Manso's views on education reform and women's educational rights), and Cuba for Noronha's violinist career before they once again returned to Brazil in 1852. Manso's first daughter, Eulalia, was born in Rio de Janeiro in 1846, and her second daughter Hermina followed closely after. While in Rio de Janeiro, Manso focused her energy on teaching and educating girls, as well as creating the feminist journal, started in 1852 called, O Jornal das Senhoras (The Ladies' Journal)—one of the first newspapers in Brazil to be both written and managed by women. Eventually she turned the journal over to another Brazilian feminist, Violante A. Ximenes de Bivar e Vellasco to continue publishing and editing. In 1852, Noronha suddenly abandoned Manso and their two daughters. Facing financial hardship, Manso, for a short time, humored the idea of attending the Medical School of Rio de Janeiro to become a midwife, only for the plan to fall through. Subsequently, after Juan Manuel de Rosas's fall from power, Manso would finally return to Buenos Aires in 1853 for the first time since her family's exile. There, she established the newspaper Álbum de señoritas (Ladies Album) in 1854, which garnered little success. Luckily, Manso did find success in the educational journal, Anales de la educación (Annals of common education), which was founded in 1858 by Domingo Faustino Sarmiento, until he transferred the leadership of the journal to Manso in 1865, which she would maintain until 1875.

In 1859, Manso would become the principal of Buenos Aires' first co-ed school with the assistance of Sarmiento, who had enormous connections in the educational sphere due to his position as the head of the Elementary Schools Department in Buenos Aires at the time. Around the same time, Manso would also become a member of the National Education Council—becoming the first woman to do so. The 1860s and 1870s saw Manso's incredible devotion to bettering Argentina's education system: along with continuing her work in Anales de la educación, Manso also published both the Compendia de la Historia de las Provincias Unidas del Río de La Plata (Compendium of the History of the United Provinces of the River Plate), as well as the Historia general del Descubrimiento y la Conquista de Nuevo Mundo al alcace de los niños (General history of the discovery and conquest of the New World for children) in 1862, both of which were intended to better or improve teaching in Argentina. A further advancement in 1868 saw Manso become a member of Argentina's Board of Public Instruction, making her the first woman to ever be appointed to a position in the Argentine government. In 1871, Manso would be initiated into the membership of the National School Commission, once again becoming the first woman in the organization; a reoccurring pattern of Manso's.

Juana Paula Manso died in Buenos Aires on April 24, 1875, having overcome the limitations which 19th century society had shackled her with, and left the world with a lasting legacy in the reformations she made in Argentinian education and her advocation for women's right to education.

On 26 June 2017, a Google Doodle commemorated her 198th birthday.
