= Encuentro Nacional de Mujeres =

Annual women's gathering in Argentina

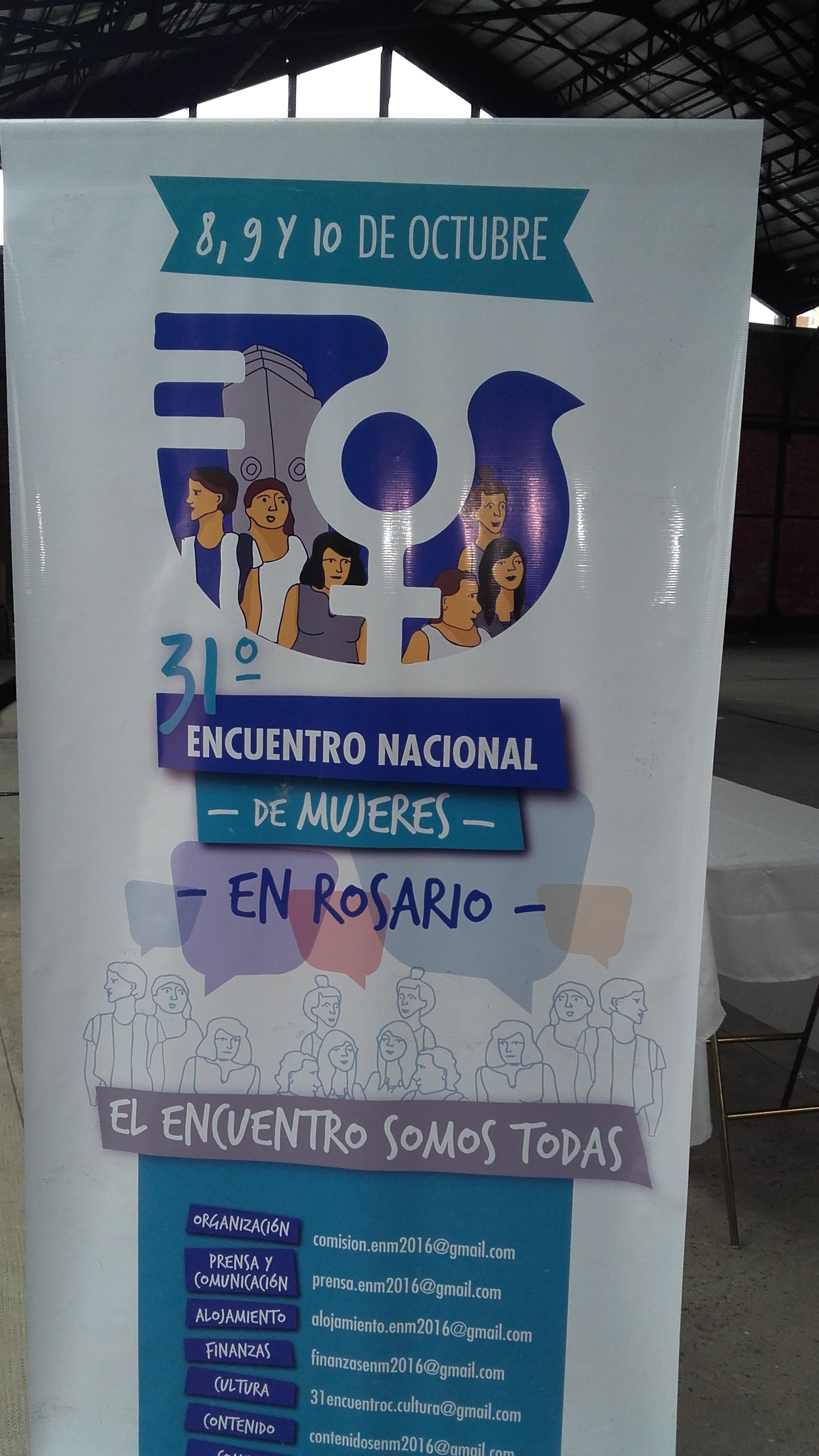
Banner for the 31st Encuentro Nacional de Mujeres (2016) held in the city of Rosario.

The Encuentro Nacional de Mujeres (English: National Women's Meeting) is an annual women's gathering in Argentina that has occurred every year since 1986. These meetings are characterized as autonomous, self-organized, democratic, pluralistic, self-managed, federal, and horizontal. They are held in different cities throughout the country each year, with the new venue being chosen democratically at the closing assembly, where the final document is also read. During the meeting women come together for three days to learn, exchange ideas, participate in workshops, and debate.
