= Ilse Fuskova =

Argentinian feminist, activist and journalist (1929–2024)

Ilse Kornreich
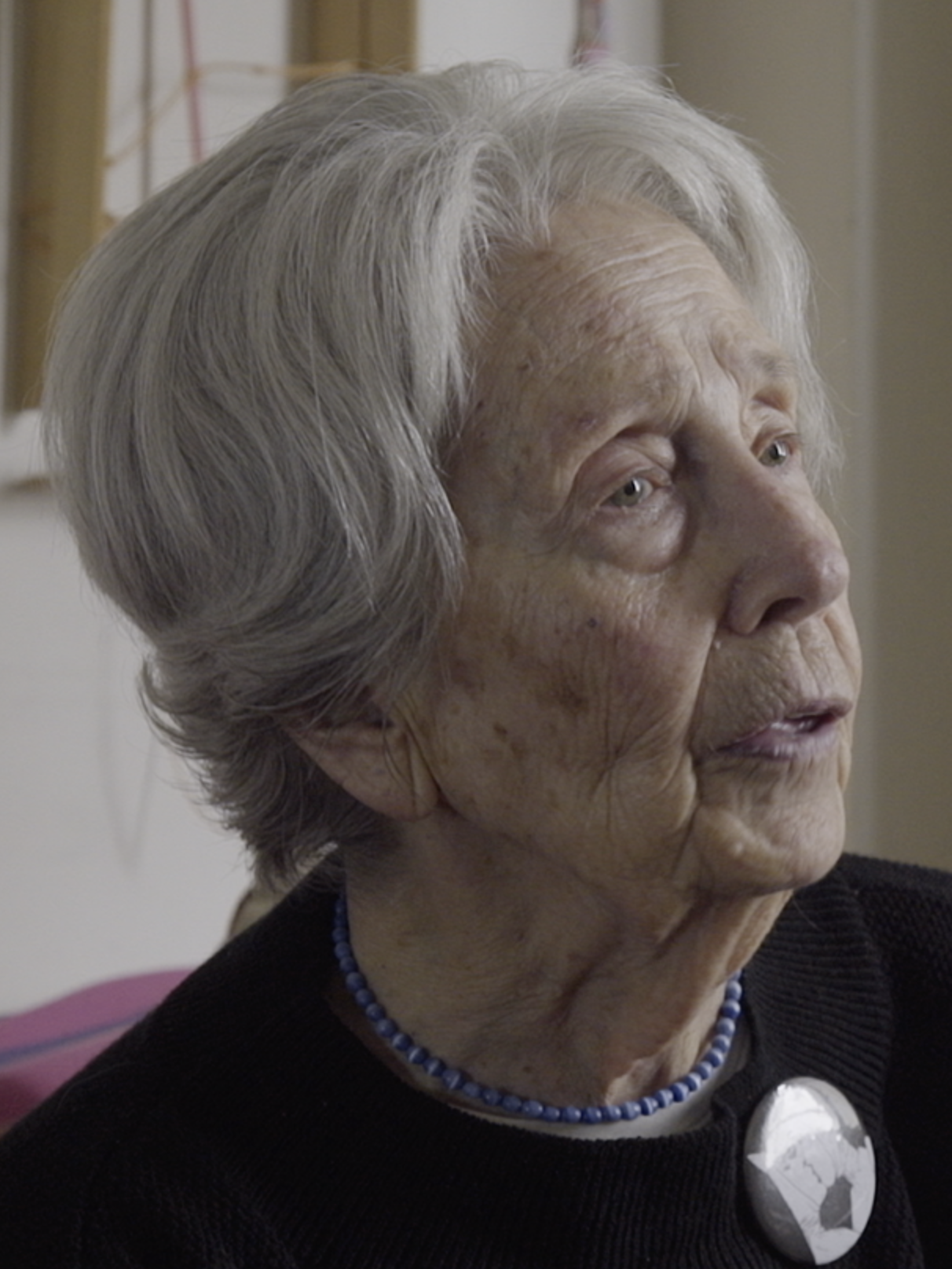
- Kornreich in 2022
- Born: 10 June 1926; Buenos Aires, Argentina
- Died: 27 June 2024 (aged 95); Buenos Aires, Argentina
- Children: 3

Ilse Fusková Kornreich (11 June 1929 – 27 June 2024) was an Argentine activist, lesbian-feminist, and journalist.

Fuskova was the first woman who came out and openly declared that she was a lesbian on Argentine television. This occurred in 1991 when TV host Mirtha Legrand invited Fuskova to participate in one of her televised lunches. It was said to be the most-watched show of the year. Fuskova was married and had three children.

In 1984, she separated and in the following year, began a lesbian-feminist movement. She was co-editor of Cuadernos de Existencia Lesbiana (Journal of the Lesbian Existence) with Adriana Carrasco, the first issue released 8 March 1987. In the 1990s, she joined Gays por los Derechos Civiles (Gays for Civil Rights) with Carlos Jáuregui. She was instrumental in organizing lesbian, gay, and the first trans activists to develop the first Marcha del Orgullo LGBT de Buenos Aires (Lesbian-Gay Pride Parade) in June 1992. For 20 years, she was in a relationship with Claudina Marek, who is also active in lesbian activism. Together, they published in 1994, a conversation with Silvia Schmid, the book Amor de mujeres. El lesbianismo en la Argentina, hoy (Love of women. Lesbianism in Argentina, today). " Fuskova was honored at the "Primer Encuentro Nacional de Mujeres Lesbianas y Bisexuales de Rosario" (First National Women's Lesbian and Bisexual of Rosario) in 2008.

In later years, she focused on environmentalism and was in a relationship with a gay man. In 2015, she was declared Citizen of the City of Buenos Aires by the Buenos Aires Legislature. Fuskova died on 27 June 2024, at the age of 95.

== Selected works ==
- Amor de mujeres : el lesbianismo en la Argentina, hoy (with Claudina Marek, 1994). ISBN 978-950-742-568-4.

== Bibliography ==
- Bergmann, Emilie L. (1995). Entiendes?: Queer Readings, Hispanic Writings. Duke University Press. ISBN 0-8223-1615-3.
- Díez, Jordi (5 May 2015). The Politics of Gay Marriage in Latin America: Argentina, Chile, and Mexico. Cambridge University Press. ISBN 978-1-316-30072-5.
