= Gender quota (disambiguation) =

Gender quota may refer to:

- Gender representation on corporate boards of directors § Gender quotas
- Reservation in India § Gender
- Quota system in Pakistan § Civil Service
- Father's quota, for paternity leave in Norway
- Transgender rights in Brazil § Gender quotas
- Women in the Brazilian Congress § Gender quotas and women's representation

== See also ==
- Sexism
- Gender diversity
