= Human rights in Argentina =

The history of human rights in Argentina is affected by the last civil-military dictatorship in the country (1976-1983) and its aftermath. The dictatorship is known in North America as the "Dirty War", a named coined by the dictatorship itself to justify their actions of State-sponsored terrorism against Argentine citizenry, which were backed by the United States as part of their planned Operation Condor, and carried out primarily by Jorge Rafael Videla's de facto rule (1976-1981), but also after it and until democracy was restored in 1983. However, the human rights situation in Argentina has improved significantly since the end of the dictatorship.

== History ==
According to the Nunca Más report issued by the National Commission on the Disappearance of Persons (CONADEP) in 1984, about 9,000 people had "disappeared" between 1976 and 1983. According to a secret cable from Chilean Intelligence in Buenos Aires, an estimate by the Argentine 601st Intelligence Battalion in mid-July 1978 —which had started counting victims in 1975— gave the figure of 22,000 persons; the Argentine dictatorship itself also reported killing 22,000 citizens in a 1978 communication to Chilean Intelligence. This estimate was first published by John Dinges in 2004. Current estimates by human rights organizations are up to 30,000. The Montoneros admitted losing 5,000 guerrillas killed, and the ERP admitted the loss of another 5,000 of their own guerrillas killed. By comparison, Argentine security forces cite 775 deaths of their own. In contrast, there were 13,500 victims of left-wing terrorism in Argentina. There is no agreement on the actual number of detenidos-desaparecidos. In an interview with Buenos Aires daily Clarin in 2009, Fernandez Meijide, who formed part of the 1984 truth commission, claimed that the documented number of Argentines killed or disappeared was closer to 9,000. The Asemblea por los Derechos Humanos (APDH or Permanent Assembly for Human Rights) estimated the number of disappeared as 12,261, which included "definitive disappearances" and PEN detainee survivors of the clandestine detention centres spread throughout Argentina. The total figure of official prisoners was 8,625 and of these PEN detainees 157 were killed after being released from detention. Between 1969 and 1979 left-wing guerrillas accounted for 3,249 kidnappings and murders. CONADEP also recorded 458 assassinations (attributed to the Argentine Anticommunist Alliance) and about 600 forced disappearances during the period of democratic rule between 1973 and 1976.

The laws of Obediencia debida ("Due Obedience") and Punto Final ("Stop") known as the laws of impunity were annulled by the Supreme Court on June 14, 2005 using the concept of crimes against humanity, after on April 19, 2005 the Third Chamber of the Spanish National Court sentenced the naval officer, Adolfo Scilingo, for crimes against humanity, which was confirmed by the Spanish Supreme Court on October 1, 2007. The principle used by the sentence was ratified by the European Court of Human Rights in the case Petr Kislyiy against Estonia on January 17, 2006 and Inter-American Court of Human Rights ruling in the Case of Almonacid on September 26, 2006. The fact that these statements recognize the application of this concept of international law in ordinary courts is a milestone in the history of international human rights. This situation led to the opening of some trials in Cordoba, Corrientes, Tucumán and Buenos Aires and there are several on the procedural schedule. Sentences confirmed the implementation of the concept of "crimes against humanity", but investigations were not adequate to international law, or have joined the investigation and prosecution procedures as consistent with the types of crimes arising from international criminal law. This affects, using ordinary criminal law standards, the type of testing needed and who may be charged. There procedural certainty is impossible to substantiate the thousands of lawsuits pending across the country and to keep the current procedure.

== Respect for the integrity of the person ==
=== Arbitrary or unlawful deprivation of life ===
While the government or its agents did not commit any politically motivated killings, there are reports that police committed killings involving unwarranted or excessive force. Generally, officers accused of wrongdoing are administratively suspended until completion of an investigation. Authorities investigated and in some cases detained, prosecuted, and convicted the officers involved.

The non-governmental organization (NGO) Coordinator Against Police Repression (CORREPI) reported that security forces using excessive force killed more than 200 persons each year.

In January 2008 local victim advocacy organization Madres del Dolor lodged with court a case accusing two policemen of killing 21-year-old Sergio Enciso in Buenos Aires Province. The case remained pending till the end of 2008.

According to Madres del Dolor, a judge detained five police officers and the police chief of Ramos Mejia in Buenos Aires Province for the February death of 35-year-old Gaston Duffau after an official autopsy confirmed that the victim died from multiple blows to the body and asphyxia. The police officials involved remained in pretrial detention at year's end.

There are no known developments in the case of Carlos Madrid, an off duty Buenos Aires police sergeant, who was in pretrial detention for the November 2007 killing of Daniel Ezequiel Cespedes.

In July 2008 a court sentenced police officer Dario Poblete to life imprisonment for the April 2007 killing of school teacher Carlos Fuentealba during a teachers' strike in Neuquen.

In September a Jujuy provincial court sentenced one police officer to life imprisonment and another to four years in prison for the 2006 death of Saul Mendoza. The court acquitted a third officer and continued to investigate a fourth.

There were no known developments in the trial of two former police officers and a civilian charged with homicide in the 2006 beating and shooting death of 15-year-old Miguel Eduardo Cardozo.

Human rights groups stated to the press that ex-police officer Marta Jorgelina Oviedo was serving her life imprisonment sentence for the 2002 killing of Andrea Viera under house arrest.

In August 2008 the government, as recommended by the Inter-American Court of Human Rights in 2003, reopened an investigation into the 1991 killing by police forces of Walter Bulacio. The trial remained pending at year's end.

=== Disappearance ===
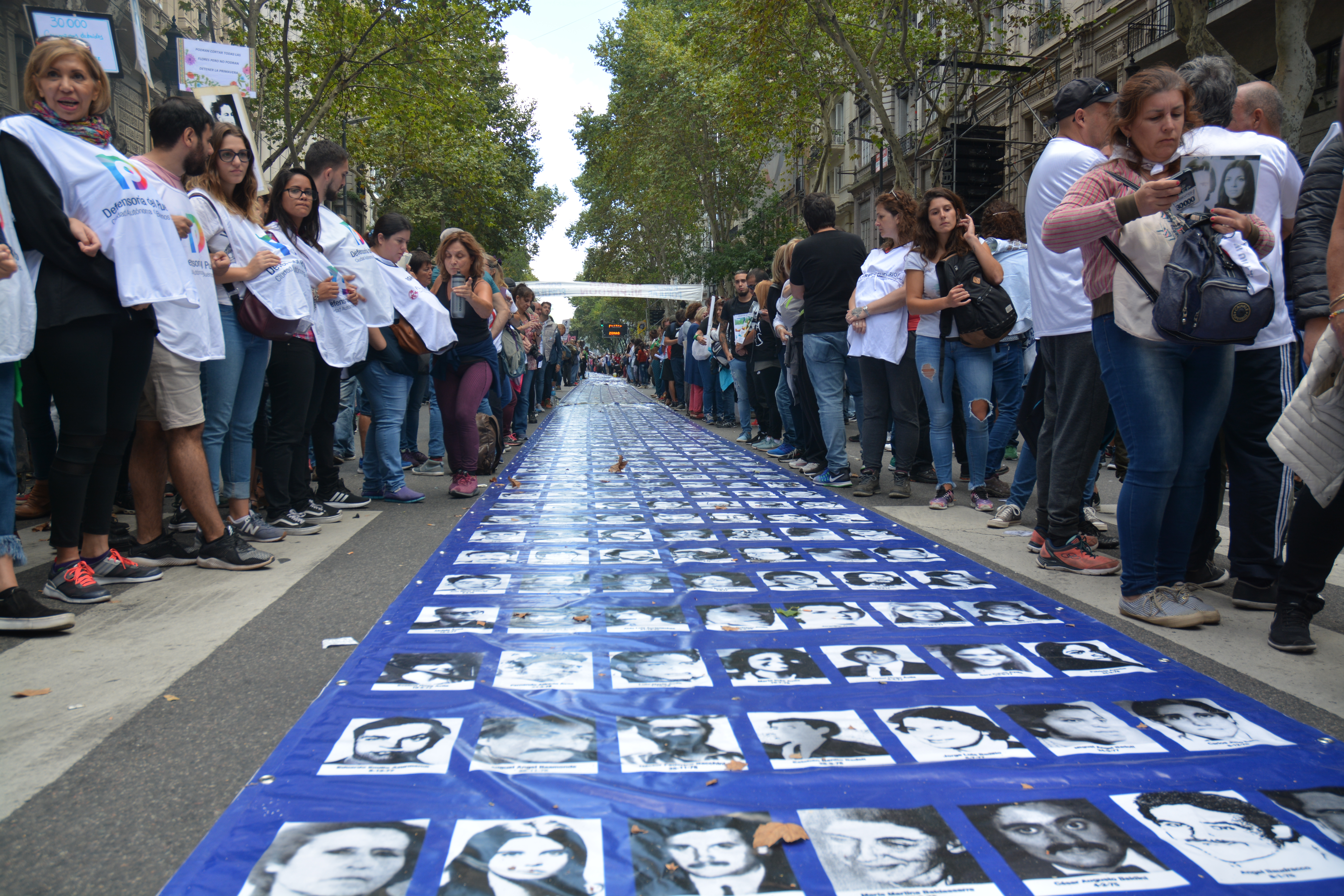
Photos of those who disappeared during the Day of Remembrance for Truth and Justice in Buenos Aires, 24 March 2019

In contrast with the systematic forced disappearance of persons under the military dictatorship, the situation has greatly improved and there were no reports of politically motivated disappearances in 2008.

Judicial proceedings related to killings, disappearances, and torture committed by the 1976-83 military dictatorship continue to this day. According to a human rights organization, the Center for Legal and Social Studies (CELS), by the end of 2008, there were 255 ongoing judicial investigations and an estimated 508 persons indicted for crimes against humanity committed during the Dirty War era. Of those indicted, 358 remained in pretrial detention. At least 14 former state security agents and their civilian allies were convicted of human rights crimes, including forced disappearances and kidnappings. A November 2008 Noticias Argentinas press report, compiling information provided by the National Prosecutor General's Office, stated that 32 individuals had been convicted for crimes against humanity since 2003, 371 suspects remained in pretrial detention, and 61 persons remained fugitives from justice. In March 2008 a federal court decided that crimes committed by the Argentine Anti Communism Alliance before and during the military dictatorship were crimes against humanity and therefore not subject to the statute of limitations.

The press, civil society, and legal scholars express concern that the government's efforts to pursue justice for human rights crimes committed during the military dictatorship does not include armed guerrilla groups that also were accused of committing abuses during the same time period. In January 2008 a court released the wife and two children of former naval official Hector Febres, who died of cyanide poisoning in prison while facing charges of torture. They still faced charges on suspicion that they helped Febres commit suicide. In March a federal court released two Coast Guard constables who were arrested in connection with the case.

In March 2008 the National Human Rights Secretariat pressed homicide charges against former economy minister Jose Martinez de Hoz, who served under the military dictatorship, for the death of economist Juan Carlos Casariego Del Bel.

In March 2008 former navy lieutenant commander Ricardo Cavallo was extradited from Spain to Argentina to face charges of crimes against humanity committed during the military dictatorship. Cavallo was indicted in July and remained in pretrial detention at year's end.

In May 2008 federal authorities indicted Ernesto Barreiro for his role in committing human rights abuses during the military dictatorship, when he served as an army officer and chief interrogator at the La Perla clandestine torture center. He remained in pretrial detention at year's end.

In April 2008 former police officers Fernando Esvedes and Carlos Vercellone were arrested for their alleged role in political kidnappings and torture in the clandestine detention center Pozo de Arana during the military dictatorship, and their trial remained pending at year's end.

In July former army chief Luciano Benjamin Menendez and former army officials Oreste Valentin Padovan, Ricardo Alberto Ramon Lardone, Carlos Alberto Diaz, and Luis Alberto Manzanelli were sentenced to life imprisonment for human rights violations committed during the military dictatorship. Former army officials Hermes Oscar Rodriguez, Jorge Exequiel Acosta, and Carlos Alberto Vega received sentences ranging from 18 to 22 years' imprisonment.

In August 2008 former army lieutenant colonel Julio Rafael Barreiro was sentenced to life imprisonment, while former captain Juan Carlos de Marchi and former colonel Horacio Losito were sentenced to 25 years' imprisonment for their role in human rights violations during the military dictatorship. Former gendarmerie commander Raul Alfredo Reynoso was sentenced to 18 years.

In August 2008 a human rights trial against former brigadier general Enrique Braulio Olea, former colonels Oscar Lorenzo Reinhold and Mario Alberto Gomez Arenas, former major Luis Alberto Farias Barrera, former military officers Jorge Eduardo Molina Ezcurra and Sergio Adolfo San Martin, and doctor Hilarion de la Paz Sosa began in Neuquen Province. The former military officials were accused of 17 counts of crimes against humanity committed during the military dictatorship.

In September 2008 a federal judge resumed an investigation into the 1973 killing of General Labor Confederation leader Jose Ignacio Rucci, in which the armed guerrilla group, the Montoneros, was believed to have been involved.

In October 2008 federal authorities indicted former National University Concentration chief Eduardo Cincotta, former member Nicolas Cafarello, three former air force officials, and former army colonel Roberto Atilio Bocalandro for human rights crimes committed in the clandestine detention center La Cueva in Mar del Plata. They remained in pretrial detention at year's end.

In October 2008 former army officials Alberto Barda, Hipolito Mariani, and Cesar Comes received sentences ranging from 25 years' to life imprisonment for human rights violations committed in the clandestine detention centers of Mansion Sere and La Cueva. In December the Court of Criminal Appeals ordered that 21 military officials accused of human rights violations during the military dictatorship be freed on bail, including two of the most notorious suspects, ex-naval captains Alfredo Astiz and Jorge Acosta. The three-judge panel noted that the men had spent more than five years in detention without a trial, far in excess of the two-year legal limit for pretrial detention. The prosecutors, CELS, and the Grandmothers of the Plaza de Mayo subsequently appealed the decision, and the officers remained in detention pending a Supreme Court decision. The government sought to impeach the judges who ordered the release.

There were no developments in the 2006 missing persons case of Jorge Julio Lopez, a key witness in the case against Miguel Etchecolatz, former commissioner general of the Buenos Aires Province police.

Judicial authorities continued to investigate cases of kidnapping and illegal adoption by members of the former military dictatorship of children born to detained dissidents. At year's end, 96 of an estimated 500 persons born to detained and disappeared dissidents and illegally adopted had been identified and made aware of their true backgrounds.

In April 2008 a court sentenced a military official to 10 years in prison for his role in facilitating the illegal adoption of Maria Eugenia Sampallo Barragan, the daughter of political dissidents killed during the military dictatorship. This was the first case of its kind, and Sampallo's adoptive parents were sentenced to seven and eight years' imprisonment.

=== Torture and other cruel, inhuman, or degrading treatment or punishment ===
Although the law prohibits such practices and provides penalties for torture similar to those for homicide, there are reports that some police and prison guards continue to employ torture and brutality. CELS reported police brutality and occasional alleged torture of suspects, particularly during prison transfers. While the government has investigated such reports, there were few convictions.

In 2008, according to CELS, a prison detainee in the Olmos, Buenos Aires, provincial prison asserted he had received knife injuries from a senior prison official in the presence of another prison official. A detainee in the Sierra Chica Prison in Buenos Aires Province filed a complaint for being subjected to solitary confinement for 45 days with no clothes or food. A 17-year-old minor also filed a complaint alleging that police agents in a police station in Hurlingham, Buenos Aires Province, subjected him to electrical shocks. Two lower ranking navy officials and a civilian remained in pretrial detention for the 2006 kidnapping, beating, torture, and killing of 15-year-old Lucas Ivarrola, were accused of stealing a television set. A trial date had not been set by year's end.

=== Prison and detention center conditions ===
The country's prisons remain in inhumane conditions, and prisoners often spend years in jail before trial. Police continue to abuse their power by hitting, and even torturing people in police stations. In fact, there have been instances of new desaparecidos ("disappeared").

Prison conditions often are poor and life-threatening; in many facilities, extreme overcrowding, poor nutrition, inadequate medical and psychological treatment, inadequate sanitation, limited family visits, and frequent inhuman and degrading treatment are common, according to various reports by human rights organizations and research centers. The research center Unidos por la Justicia estimated prison overcrowding at 20 percent nationwide, while credible press reports estimated prison overcrowding in Buenos Aires Province exceeded 25 percent.

The Buenos Aires Provincial Memory Commission's Committee Against Torture reported that, during the first 11 months of the year in Buenos Aires provincial prisons, there were 86 prisoner deaths and 5,169 violent incidents, resulting in injuries to 4,800 prisoners. According to an earlier report from the committee covering the first half of the year, authorities repressed violent incidents with rubber bullets and sticks on 564 occasions. The committee attributed the violence to inmate attacks on fellow prisoners and on prison officials. The committee also criticized the provincial prison health-care system.

In April 2008 federal criminal prosecutor Francisco Mugnolo filed a case with the Supreme Court arguing that inadequate federal control over federal prisons resulted in human rights violations and torture of some prisoners. He also released a report claiming that 63 percent of federal prisoners in the second half of 2007 had experienced physical aggression.

Also in April, Alfredo Emiliano Fleitas, a prisoner in Villa Devoto Prison, petitioned the courts for a writ of habeas corpus after having been beaten by prison guards in February during a transfer to Ezeiza Prison. Fleitas was hospitalized as a result of his injuries and underwent surgery to restore his vision. In August 2008 the Buenos Aires Provincial Supreme Court ordered the Provincial Criminal Court of Appeals to decide a collective habeas corpus case filed by CELS on behalf of provincial prisoners who were subject to mistreatment and violence during prison transfers.

While women were held separately from men, the law permits children to stay in prison with their mothers until age four. Press reports estimated that 86 children under the age of four lived with their mothers in federal prisons, with an additional 75 in Buenos Aires provincial prisons. In general men's prisons were more violent, dangerous, and crowded than the women's prisons.

Overcrowding in juvenile facilities often resulted in minors being held in police station facilities, although separate from adult detainees. According to a 2007 UN Children's Fund and National Secretariat for Human Rights report, these institutions held approximately 20,000 children, 20 percent of whom were under age 16. The overwhelming majority had not committed a crime; rather, they were abandoned by their families or considered "at risk" for other reasons.

Pretrial detainees often were held with convicted prisoners. CELS estimated that 53 percent of those in federal prison were awaiting trial. In November 2008 the Buenos Aires Provincial Court initiated trial proceedings in the case against Buenos Aires Magdalena Provincial Prison Director Carlos Tejeda and 15 prison guards and officials accused of abandoning prisoners in a 2005 fire that killed 33 prisoners.

The government permitted prison visits by local and international human rights observers, and such visits have been taking place.

=== Arbitrary arrest or detention ===
The law prohibits arbitrary arrest and detention, and the government generally observes these prohibitions; however, police reportedly arrests and detains citizens arbitrarily on occasion. The federal police have jurisdiction for maintaining law and order in the federal capital and for federal crimes in the provinces. Other federal police authorities include the Airport Security Police, the Gendarmerie, the Coast Guard, and the Bureau of Prisons. Additionally, each province has its own police force that responds to a provincial security ministry or secretariat. Individual forces vary considerably in their effectiveness and respect for human rights. Corruption is widespread in some forces, and internal controls to counter police abuses are often weak.

The most frequent abuses include extortion of, and protection for, those involved in drug trafficking, prostitution, and trafficking in persons.

The federal security forces have the authority to conduct internal investigations into alleged abuses and to fire individuals who have allegedly committed a human rights violation. The federal government can also file complaints with the federal courts; provincial governments may do the same for provincial security forces. Members of security forces convicted of a crime were subject to stiff penalties. In 2008, authorities in Buenos Aires Province removed more than 700 police officers for corruption and other offenses.

Police may detain suspects for up to 10 hours without an arrest warrant if the authorities have a well-founded belief that the suspects have committed, or are about to commit, a crime or are unable to determine the suspected person's identity. Human rights groups report that the police often detains suspects longer than 10 hours.

The law provides a person in detention with the right to a prompt determination of the legality of the detention, which entails appearance before a criminal lower court judge, who determines whether to proceed with an investigation. There are frequent delays in this process and in informing detainees of the charges against them.

The law provides for the right to bail, except in cases involving narcotics, violent crimes, and firearms violations. Although the bail system was used, civil rights groups claimed that judges were more likely to order the holding of indicted suspects in preventive or pretrial detention than to allow suspects to remain free pending their trial. In November 2008 the highest penal court broadly ruled that pretrial detention should be the exception to the rule, except in cases where a suspect represents a flight risk or may act to obstruct justice. Detainees are allowed prompt access to counsel, and public defenders were provided for detainees unable to afford counsel, although such access sometimes was delayed due to an overburdened system. Strong demand and a lack of resources for the Public Defender's Office results in an excessive caseload for public defense attorneys.

Although there are no official statistics on the percentage of detainees requesting public defense attorneys, human rights organizations estimated that 80 percent requested public defense attorneys. Detainees also were allowed access to family members, although not always promptly.

The law provides for investigative detention of up to two years for indicted persons awaiting or undergoing trial; the period may be extended for one year in limited situations. The slow pace of the justice system often resulted in lengthy detentions beyond the period stipulated by law. CELS reported that prisoners waited an average of three years to be tried, with some cases taking as long as six years to go to trial. A convicted prisoner usually received credit for time already served. In 2008, in Buenos Aires Province, provisional statistics from CELS indicated that nearly 75 percent of detainees were in pretrial detention, while the Buenos Aires Provincial Memory Commission Committee Against Torture reported that 78 percent of the approximately 26,000 detainees in provincial prisons were awaiting trial.

According to several human rights organizations, 30 percent of pretrial detainees were eventually acquitted. According to the Memory Commission's committee, there were approximately 6,500 complaints of human rights violations against juvenile detainees in provincial prisons and juvenile detention facilities, the majority of which were pending investigation. In July 2008 the Buenos Aires Provincial Supreme Court inaugurated an ad hoc juvenile justice system, which operated in eight out of 18 provincial districts. It provides minors age 16 to 18 the same procedural rights as adults and limits sentences to 180 days in prison. In August 2008 the minister of justice announced that he had instructed police forces to conform standard operating procedures for arresting minors to international standards; however, by year's end, there was no information on application of procedures.

=== Denial of fair public trial ===
The law provides for the right to a fair trial, and the judiciary generally enforced this right. However, there are complaints that some lower court federal judges, provincial judges, and judicial personnel were inefficient and at times subject to political manipulation. Justice organizations are particularly critical of the lack of independence of lower court judges with federal jurisdiction in many provinces. The judicial system is hampered by inordinate delays, procedural logjams, changes of judges, inadequate administrative support, and general inefficiency caused by remnants of the inquisitorial criminal justice system used in federal and many provincial courts. Judges have broad discretion as to whether and how to pursue investigations, contributing to a public perception that many decisions were arbitrary. Allegations of corruption in provincial courts as well as federal courts located in the provinces were more frequent than federal courts with jurisdiction over the city and province of Buenos Aires, reflecting strong connections between the executive and judicial branches at the provincial level. In May 2008 the Congress passed a law establishing a process to appoint temporary judges in response to a 2007 Supreme Court order. However, legal scholars expressed concern that the law encourages delays in the selection of permanent judges and increases the executive branch's authority to appoint temporary judges without public vetting. At year's end, there were 160 vacant judgeships nationwide. There were some criticisms in the press that interim judges were subject to political manipulation due to the temporary nature of their position.

The judicial system is divided into federal and provincial courts, both headed by a supreme court with appellate courts and district courts below it. The federal courts are divided between the criminal and civil courts. In August 2008 the Congress voted to abolish the military justice system, thus making members of the military subject to civil proceedings for crimes committed during peacetime and to a new military disciplinary code for infractions of military rules.

Trials are public, and defendants have the right to legal counsel and to call defense witnesses in the federal and some provincial courts that have an accusatory system of criminal justice. If needed, a public defender is provided at public expense when defendants face serious criminal charges. During the investigative stage, defendants can submit questions in writing to the investigating judge. A panel of judges decides guilt or innocence. Federal and provincial courts continued the transition to trials with oral arguments in criminal cases, replacing the old system of written submissions. Although the 1994 constitution provides for trial by jury, implementing legislation had not been passed by year's end. In Cordoba Province, however, defendants accused of certain serious crimes have the right to a trial by jury. Lengthy delays in trials are a nationwide problem, with many cases taking five or more years to resolve. Defendants are presumed innocent and have the right to appeal, as do prosecutors. Minors under age 16 cannot be criminally prosecuted. By law defendants and attorneys have access to government held evidence, but they may experience significant obstacles or delays in obtaining such evidence. In 2008, the human rights organization Fundacion Sur noted that the country lacked a separate juvenile justice system that affords adolescents due process protections and the right to a legal defense in criminal cases and expressed concern that the broad discretion judges have in such cases increased the possibility of arbitrary rulings. The age of legal liability is 16, and Fundacion Sur asserted that 16- and 17-year-old offenders frequently were transferred to adult criminal courts or held in juvenile detention centers for longer periods than warranted by their offenses. A December 2008 Supreme Court decision found that the country's juvenile justice system did not comply with international conventions and highlighted the need for the legislative branch to remedy the situation.

There were no reports of political prisoners or detainees.

There is an independent and impartial judiciary in civil matters, and anyone may bring lawsuits seeking damages or the protection of rights provided by the constitution. Government agencies, professional bar associations, universities, and NGOs provide free legal counseling and may represent indigent persons before civil courts as well as assist them in alternative dispute resolution proceedings.

=== Arbitrary interference with privacy, family, home, or correspondence ===
The constitution prohibits such actions, and the government generally respected these prohibitions in practice.

== Civil liberties ==
=== Freedom of speech and press ===
2025 World Press Freedom Index Good: 85–100 points Satisfactory: 70–85 points Problematic: 55–70 points Difficult: 40–55 points Very serious <40 points Not classified

The constitution provides for freedom of speech and of the press, and the government generally respected these rights in practice. Individuals can criticize the government publicly or privately, but there are criminal penalties, including prison sentences, for libel and slander, and government officials have sought to use these against the political opposition and other critics. The government pressed criminal libel and slander charges against Elisa Carrio, head of the opposition Civic Coalition party, for accusing officials in 2004 of corruption. In September 2008 Carrio won a civil case brought by the son of a deceased Peronist leader whom she accused of being involved in official corruption, murder, and drug trafficking; it was the second such case she had won. In December 2008 security forces arrested 26 "neo-Nazis," including four minors, on discrimination charges for conducting a ceremony to commemorate the death of World War II German naval captain Hans Langsdorff. All individuals subsequently were released but still faced discrimination charges.

Numerous FM radio stations continue to broadcast with temporary licenses pending conclusion of a licensing normalization process. In August 2008 AM radio signal Radio Continental, which had been critical of the government, filed a complaint before the Federal Broadcasting Committee (COMFER) for its decision to suspend its FM broadcast. Although the complaint was not resolved by year's end, COMFER did not enforce its decision, and the station continued to broadcast on the FM frequency.

In August 2008 the Association for Civil Rights and the Open Society Justice Initiative published a report alleging that the government's allocation of state advertising funds affected press freedom. The report claimed that the government abused the distribution of state advertising to benefit or punish the press according to the tone of their coverage of the administration. This assessment coincided with press reports and comments made in private by media organization leaders.

According to the Association for Civil Rights, the Neuquen provincial government had not complied by the end of 2008 with a 2007 Supreme Court order to present an official advertising distribution plan that would not indirectly curtail freedom of speech. The 2006 lawsuit lodged by the country's second largest media company, Grupo Editorial Perfil, against the federal government's use of government advertising as a means of indirect censorship remained pending at year's end.

Journalist Sergio Poma died in January 2008 while awaiting appeal of a September 2007 Salta provincial court decision that sentenced him to a one-year suspended prison term and barred him from practicing journalism for one year for slandering the former governor of Salta.

In November 2008 labor activists from the teamsters union, led by Hugo Moyano, vice president of the ruling Peronist Party and leader of the General Labor Confederation (CGT), blocked a newspaper distribution center jointly run by the country's two leading newspapers, Clarin and La Nacion. The union maintained that the protest was technically for better wage and working conditions for the teamsters that drive newspaper distribution trucks. However, media organizations and the opposition criticized the government failure to break up the blockade and called it a direct attack on press freedom; the two newspapers filed criminal charges against the perpetrators.

There are no government restrictions on access to the Internet or reports that the government monitored e mail or Internet chat rooms. Individuals and groups can engage in the peaceful expression of views via the Internet, including by e mail. According to the government's National Statistics and Census Institute, there are more than three million residential Internet users.

There are no government restrictions on academic freedom or cultural events.

=== Freedom of peaceful Assembly and Association ===
The constitution provides for freedom of assembly and association, and the government generally respects these rights in practice.

=== Freedom of religion ===
The constitution provides for freedom of religion, and the government generally respected this right in practice. The constitution also states that the federal government "sustains the apostolic Roman Catholic faith," and the government provided the Catholic Church with a variety of subsidies not available to other religious groups. Other religious faiths were practiced freely.

In order to hold public worship services, obtain visas for foreign missionaries, and obtain tax exempt status, religious organizations must register with the Secretariat of Worship in the Ministry of Foreign Relations, International Trade, and Worship and report periodically to maintain their status.

Acts of discrimination and vandalism against religious minorities, particularly the 300,000 member Jewish community, continued. During the year, the Delegation of Israeli Argentine Associations (DAIA) received approximately 202 complaints of anti-Semitic acts. The most commonly reported incidents were desecration of Jewish cemeteries, anti-Semitic graffiti, verbal slurs, and other forms of harassment.

In August 2008 Raul Arenas Vega was sentenced to nine months' imprisonment for the 2006 beating of an Orthodox Jewish teenager in Buenos Aires. The investigation continued into the 1994 bombing of the Argentine Jewish Mutual Aid Association (AMIA) building in Buenos Aires that killed 85 persons. In May 2008 a federal prosecutor called for the indictment of former President Carlos Menem, former federal judge Juan Galeano, and others for their alleged role in covering up and protecting those involved in the attack. Subsequently, the presiding federal judge, following recommendations from the AMIA Special Prosecutor, issued an international request for the seizure of assets belonging to eight Iranians and Hezbollah to cover damages being claimed by the civil suit brought against the perpetrators. In December the judge ordered the seizure of six commercial properties allegedly belonging to a former Iranian cultural attache who was among those accused of aiding in the attack.

There are still no developments in DAIA's case against activists from the left wing group Quebracho that prevented Jewish community groups from demonstrating in front of the Iranian Embassy in 2006.

The government continues to support a public dialogue to highlight past discrimination and to encourage improved religious tolerance.

In 2023, the country was scored 4 out of 4 for religious freedom. In the same year, a study assessing nations' levels of religious regulation and persecution (with scores ranging from 0-10 where 0 represented low levels of regulation or persecution), Argentina received a score of 1.5 on Government Regulation of Religion, 4.7 on Social Regulation of Religion and 8.1 on Government Favoritism of Religion.

=== Freedom of movement within the country, foreign travel, emigration, and repatriation ===
The constitution provides for freedom of movement within the country, foreign travel, emigration, and repatriation, and the government generally respected these rights in practice.

The government cooperates with the Office of the UN High Commissioner for Refugees (UNHCR) and other humanitarian organizations in providing protection and assistance to refugees, asylum seekers, and other persons of concern.

The law prohibits forced exile, and the government did not exile anyone.

The law provides for the granting of asylum or refugee status in accordance with the 1951 UN Convention relating to the Status of Refugees and its 1967 protocol, and the government has established a system for providing protection to refugees. The government granted refugee status or asylum.

The law allows the government to provide temporary protection for humanitarian reasons, including family reunification, to individuals who may not qualify as refugees under the 1951 convention and the 1967 protocol.

According to the government's Refugee Eligibility Committee, in the first 11 months of 2008, 745 persons sought asylum, and the government granted refugee status to 89 persons. The government continues to cooperate with the UNHCR to resettle at risk Colombian refugees. According to the UNHCR, the country also resettled 39 Colombians in the first six months of the year.

In practice the government provides protection against the expulsion or return of refugees to countries where their lives or freedom would be threatened. The government grants refugee status and temporary protection for humanitarian reasons.

== Political rights ==
=== Elections and political participation ===
The law provides citizens the right to change their government peacefully, and citizens exercised this right in practice through periodic, free, and fair elections based on universal suffrage.

National presidential and legislative elections took place in October 2007. At the national level, one half of the seats in the Chamber of Deputies and one third of those in the Senate were contested. The media, the Ministry of Justice, and various NGOs observed the elections and judged them free and fair, although several opposition parties filed a complaint alleging that ballots listing opposition candidates were not available at voting stations in some provinces.

Provincial elections in Santiago del Estero Province took place in orderly fashion in November.

Political parties generally operated without restriction.

Decrees provide that one third of the members of both houses of congress must be women, a goal achieved through balanced election slates. There were 28 women in the 72 seat Senate and 103 women in the 256 seat Chamber of Deputies. The president, two of the seven Supreme Court justices, and four cabinet ministers were women. Women constituted approximately 17 percent of top executive-branch positions at the federal level.

One indigenous person served in the Chamber of Deputies. There were no other known ethnic or racial minorities in the national legislature. There were no known indigenous, ethnic, or racial minorities in the cabinet or on the Supreme Court.

=== Government corruption and transparency ===
The law provides criminal penalties for official corruption; however, there were frequent press reports that executive officials engaged in corrupt practices, suggesting a failure to implement the law effectively. According to the World Bank's worldwide governance indicators, government corruption is a serious problem. Historically weak institutions and an often ineffective and politicized judicial system make rooting out corruption in any systemic fashion difficult.

Public officials are subject to financial disclosure laws, and the Ministry of Justice's Anti Corruption Office (ACO) is responsible for analyzing and investigating federal executive branch officials based on their financial disclosure forms. The ACO also is responsible for investigating corruption within the federal executive branch or in matters involving federal funds, except for funds transferred to the provinces. Although nominally a part of the judicial branch, the ACO does not have authority to prosecute cases independently, but it can refer cases to other agencies or serve as the plaintiff and request a judge to initiate a case. Individual judges investigated most high-profile corruption cases, but prosecutions were not expected in a number of such cases that began in 2007.

The minister of defense dismissed 31 senior officers and officials in August 2008 and another 13 in September 2008 following investigations into corrupt practices, and in September the army chief of staff resigned following his indictment over the illegal diversion of public funds in 2002 in another command. Judicial authorities were pursuing the investigations with the ministry's support.

According to press reports, the minister of health continued to push for greater transparency in the procurement of pharmaceuticals by the agency responsible for providing medicines to senior citizens following allegations of price fixing and overcharging by suppliers, many of whom were also reportedly prominent campaign contributors in 2007. In November 2008 the agency head resigned at the government's request.

In December 2008 a foreign plea agreement by the German corporation Siemens identified by their initials and titles several high level officials in former governments as having accepted multimillion-dollar bribes in the controversial procurement of a national identification card system. Investigations conducted by the NGO Poder Ciudadano in June and the National Electoral Court in September 2008 cited irregularities in the campaign finance reports of the 2007 presidential candidates. Their findings concluded that some candidates underreported their official campaign expenses, particularly regarding advertising costs; others overreported their expenses; and some received anonymous donations, which is prohibited by law. Poder Ciudadano's report also alleged that public resources were used to promote President Cristina Fernandez de Kirchner's campaign.

An executive decree provides for public access to government information from executive agencies, which are required to answer requests for public information within 10 working days, with a possible 10-day extension. The capacity to comply with this requirement, however, varies across executive agencies. Poder Ciudadano estimates that executive branch agencies answered such requests within the required timeframe approximately 70 percent of the time. The NGO notes that politically sensitive requests, such as the operational costs of the presidency, often were delayed or went unanswered.

== Governmental response to investigation of alleged human rights violations ==
A wide variety of domestic and international human rights groups generally operates without government restriction, investigating and publishing their findings on human rights cases. Government officials usually are cooperative and generally responsive to their views.

While the government cooperates with some international and local NGOs, the local chapter of a well-known international organization expressed concern in 2008 that, despite repeated requests, the government did not provide information under a freedom of information decree. The government has a Human Rights Secretariat and a National Ombudsman's Office.

== Discrimination, societal abuses, and trafficking in persons ==
The law prohibits discrimination based on race, gender, disability, language, or social status, and the government generally enforced these prohibitions in practice.

=== Women ===
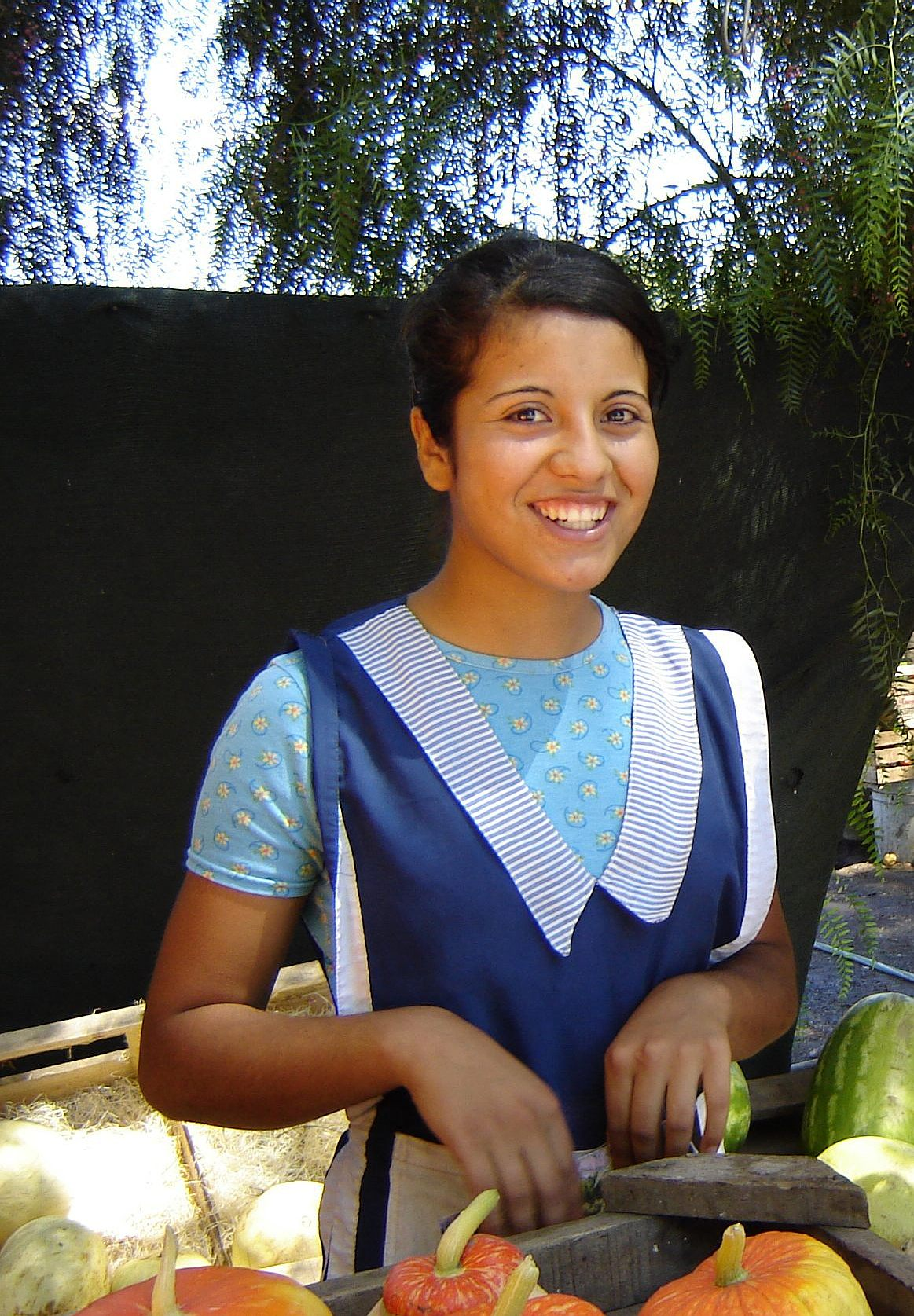
Working woman in San Rafael, Mendoza, Argentina

In 1985, Argentina ratified the Convention for the Elimination of All Forms of Discrimination against Women (CEDAW). Despite this, women are the constant target of aggressive machismo. Domestic violence including marital rape, widespread pornography and teenaged female prostitution as well as political underrepresentation are effects of the Argentinian machist patriarchy.

Domestic violence in Argentina against women is a serious problem. Rape, including spousal rape, is a crime, but the need for proof, either in the form of clear physical injury or the testimony of a witness, often presented difficulties in prosecuting such crimes. In August 2008 Amnesty International reported that a woman died every two days as a result of domestic violence. According to press reports quoting the Buenos Aires Provincial Ministry of Security statistics, 52,351 complaints of domestic abuse were filed at the Women's Police Stations in Buenos Aires Province in the first 10 months of the year.

Trafficking of women to and within the country for prostitution is a problem.

=== Children ===
Although the government voices strong commitment to children's rights and welfare, many programs remain underfunded. In September 2008 the Congress passed a law that maintained the 40-day timeframe in which parents can register the birth of their children but reduced from six years to 20 days the time thereafter for the state to register the births if parents failed to do so. For a birth occurring without medical assistance or outside a medical center, the government may authorize late registration up until one year after the birth; thereafter, only judges may order birth registrations.

While the law provides for free and compulsory education for 13 years, beginning at age five, it has not been enforced effectively. The governor of Buenos Aires estimates that there were approximately 400,000 children who neither worked nor attended school in Buenos Aires Province alone. Child abuse continues to occur and is not uncommon; for example, a University of Buenos Aires study released in August 2008 noted that 56 kindergartens and primary schools in Buenos Aires Province had detected 1,590 cases of family violence in the previous year. The government does however take some measures to combat child abuse.

The National Council for Children, Adolescents, and the Family continues to conduct public awareness campaigns and operates a national hot line, which children use to call for advice, make complaints, and report instances of abuse or other rights violations. Prosecutors and police pursue cases of Internet child pornography. In June 2008 the Congress passed a law criminalizing child pornography; however, the law does not penalize possession by individuals for personal use. The press and local NGOs reported that children were involved in sexual exploitation, sex tourism, and drug trafficking. Drawing on police statistics, the press estimates that approximately 5,000 children are recruited every year for pornography activities and sex tourism.

According to credible local press reports, dozens of child victims of violence from poor families are lodged in juvenile detention centers under judicial protection orders. City government observers are barred from visiting the centers. Local NGO Fundacion Sur express concern that the children may be subject to inhumane conditions and submitted a writ of habeas corpus in 2008 asking the courts to release the children and investigate the 2007 cases of two adolescents who allegedly committed suicide in separate incidents after having been raped while in detention. In December 2008 the Supreme Court rejected the petition but acknowledged the need to pass legislation to bring the juvenile justice system into compliance with international norms.

In December 2008 the newspaper La Nacion reported that a local NGO estimated that 3,000 children under five years of age died from malnourishment in 2008, down one-third since 2003.

On 6 October 2020, Human Rights Watch raised concerns over the publishing of child suspects’ private data online. HRW sent letters to Argentinian President Alberto Fernández and Horacio Rodríguez Larreta, the mayor of Buenos Aires city, saying that the policies and practices violate international obligations to respect children’s privacy in criminal proceedings.

=== Human trafficking ===
In April 2008 the Congress passed a law criminalizing trafficking in persons, largely due to the Marita Veron case. The country is still a source, transit point, and destination for trafficked persons.

Trafficking in persons primarily involves citizens trafficked within the country for the purposes of sexual and labor exploitation. They were trafficked mostly from the northern provinces to the central provinces and Buenos Aires and from Buenos Aires to several southern provinces. To a lesser degree, the country is a destination for victims, principally women and minors from Paraguay, the Dominican Republic, Bolivia, and Brazil. While there are no official reports on the activities of traffickers, the media reports that traffickers often present themselves as employment agencies or as individual recruiters. Credible sources also identify large organized crime networks, which sometimes consisted of extended families plus their business associates, including recruiters and brothel managers. Traffickers confiscated travel documents to prevent victims from appealing to authorities for protection. Victims, particularly women and girls in prostitution, at times are denied contact with the outside world. Victims often are threatened or beaten.

Traffickers can be prosecuted under the new federal law, which provides penalties for trafficking ranging from three to 15 years in prison, depending on the nature of the violation and the age of the victim. Traffickers have been prosecuted on charges of prostitution through fraud, intimidation, and coercion or, in the case of minors, alien smuggling, indentured servitude, and similar abuses.

Trafficking investigations and arrests increased in 2008. According to Ministry of Justice statistics, internal security agencies conducted 118 raids, arrested 120 persons suspected of human trafficking, and rescued 133 victims in the six-month period after the law took effect in late April. However, only 33 of those arrested remained in detention as of November. Official statistics on the number of prosecutions and convictions for trafficking during the year were unavailable. The Ministry of Justice was the lead agency for coordinating antitrafficking efforts with internal security agencies.

There are no allegations of federal government official involvement in trafficking. However, there are reports of widespread corruption and collusion with traffickers at provincial and local levels, which impeded prosecution. There are some efforts to investigate and prosecute local police and officials suspected of involvement in human trafficking.

There are no developments in the investigation of local police and official involvement in a 2006 case where women were forced into prostitution in Chubut Province. Press reports indicated that the two former police officers, who were charged in 2006, were reassigned without facing disciplinary actions. In March, 14 women were rescued from forced prostitution in brothels that continued to operate in the area.

In December 2008 a federal judge summoned the police commissioner, his deputy, and three other police officials for deposition as part of an investigation into alleged police protection of a ring of brothels suspected of human trafficking in the Mataderos neighborhood of Buenos Aires. In the same case, a woman running the brothel was indicted as an accessory to human trafficking, and her sister was also under investigation at year's end. Trafficking victims normally are not detained, jailed, or deported. The Ministry of Justice's training seminars for internal security forces included a component emphasizing that they not blame trafficking victims for illegal activities they may have become involved in as a consequence of their exploitation.

Limited victims' assistance is provided by the Ministry of Justice's First Responder Office for the Rescue and Immediate Assistance of Trafficking Victims. It refers minor and adult victims rescued in the city or province of Buenos Aires to the Ministry of Social Development's Secretariat for Children, Adolescents, and the Family, which then may direct victims to existing social and medical assistance programs. Victims in other provinces usually were assisted by the relevant human rights secretariat. The Prosecutor General's Office of Victim's Assistance continues to provide assistance on an as-needed basis.

Although it does not operate victim shelters dedicated to trafficking, the government funds one NGO to operate a victim's shelter. Some victims qualified for federal government assistance, but most provincial officials are not trained to identify or help victims of trafficking specifically. The International Organization for Migration assists with repatriation and reintegration of foreign victims of trafficking.

=== Persons with disabilities ===
The constitution and laws prohibit discrimination against people with physical or mental disabilities in employment, education, access to health care, or the provision of other state services, but the government does not effectively enforce these laws. A specific law also mandates access to buildings for persons with disabilities; however, the government does not effectively enforce it.

Laws mandating greater access to buses and trains for persons with disabilities also are not enforced fully. In March 2008 a federal court ordered the Buenos Aires subway operator Metrovias to make subway stations handicapped accessible. According to the Association for Civil Rights, only 12 of 73 subway stations were handicapped accessible.

According to the National Institute Against Discrimination, Xenophobia and Racism (INADI), an estimated 20,000 children with disabilities were unable to attend school in Buenos Aires City in 2008 because the buildings were not handicapped accessible.

In March 2008 the Buenos Aires City Ombudsman pressed charges against eight long-distance bus companies for failing to provide free bus tickets to persons with disabilities, as required by decree. Thereafter, INADI established a permanent office at the main bus terminal in Buenos Aires City and maintained a presence at many train and bus stations throughout the city on a rotational basis.

A 2007 study by CELS and international NGO Mental Disability Rights International reported that 25,000 persons were detained in psychiatric institutions, more than 80 percent for more than a year. The report documented egregious cases of abuse and neglect in psychiatric institutions, including patients burned to death in isolation cells, the use of sensory deprivation in long-term isolation, and physical and sexual violence. The report also detailed dangerous and unhygienic conditions, including the lack of running water, nonfunctioning sewer systems, and fire and safety hazards.

The National Advisory Committee for the Integration of People with Disabilities, under the National Council for Coordination of Social Policies, has formal responsibility for actions to accommodate persons with disabilities.

=== Indigenous people ===
The constitution recognizes the ethnic and cultural identities of indigenous people and states that the Congress shall protect their right to bilingual education, recognize their communities and the communal ownership of their ancestral lands, and allow for their participation in the management of their natural resources. In practice indigenous people do not fully participate in the management of their lands or natural resources, in part because responsibility for implementing the law is delegated to the 23 provinces, only 11 of which have constitutions recognizing indigenous rights.

Although there is no formal process to recognize indigenous tribes or determine who is an indigenous person, indigenous communities can register with the provincial or federal government as a civic association.

Estimates of the indigenous population ranged from 700,000 to 1.5 million. Poverty rates are higher than average in areas with large indigenous populations. Indigenous people have greater than average rates of illiteracy, chronic disease, and unemployment. The lack of trained teachers hampers government efforts to offer bilingual education opportunities to indigenous people.

According to indigenous rights experts, 75 percent of disputed territory in Jujuy, which had been the subject of court orders in 2006 and 2007, was either returned to indigenous communities or in the titling process by the end of 2008.

In October 2008 the Supreme Court overruled a Salta provincial court decision to turn down an appeal by the Eben Ezer indigenous community, which asked the provincial court to issue an injunction preventing the sale of provincial land previously considered a natural reserve. The Supreme Court indicated that the provincial court's decision violated the constitution and instructed the provincial court to take into consideration the rights of indigenous people to use the resources found on ancestral lands.

In December 2008, in response to a lawsuit filed by 18 indigenous communities, the Supreme Court ordered Salta Province to suspend plans to cut approximately 2 million acres (8,100 km^{2}) of forest, pending the outcome of a further hearing.

According to a Minority Rights Group International report from 2008, many provinces evicted indigenous communities from ancestral lands to sell the land to multinational companies, particularly for petroleum, mining, soy industries, and tourism development.

In December 2008, after protesters from the Mapuche community staged a roadblock, the Chubut Provincial Supreme Court suspended a lower court order evicting a Mapuche family from land they had occupied since 1940. The protesters expressed concern that Chubut Province would evict more indigenous families to provide concessions to mining companies.

The land dispute between the Mbya Guaraní community and La Plata National University over claims to territory in Misiones Province is still without resolution.

The Inter-American Commission on Human Rights (IACHR) continues to evaluate a petition presented by the Lhaka Honhat indigenous association regarding the national government's failure to implement a titling policy that would return their traditional land. The Lhaka Honhat association sent a letter to the IACHR in September 2008 asking for greater involvement and a timely resolution to the case.

In October 2008 three Mapuche families occupied land in the National Park of Nahuel Huapi in Neuquen Province in an attempt to obtain 123,000 acres (500 km^{2}) for other Mapuche communities. Park officials indicated that they already coexisted with five Mapuche communities in the area.

Also in October 2008 the first indigenous radio station, the Indigenous Voice, began broadcasting programs aimed at indigenous communities in Salta Province.

=== LGBT rights ===
During 2008, INADI received 82 complaints of discrimination on the basis of sexual orientation or gender identity, 38 of which were resolved rapidly. In July 2008 authorities arrested Sergio Alfredo Nunez, Silvio Elias Soria, and Cesar Javier Ulivarri in connection with the 2006 killing of transgender activist Pelusa Liendro, who was found stabbed in her car 10 days after the broadcast of an undercover videotape she and other activists made of police harassment and abuse of transgender persons in Salta Province. Nunez and Soria remained in pretrial detention at year's end. The court stayed legal proceedings against Rodolfo Aguilares and two other individuals.

Significant improvements have been observed in protection of LGBT rights in Argentina in the 2010s. Same-sex marriage was legalized in July 2010.

In August 2008 the National Social Security Administration granted widowed homosexual partners the rights to inherit their partner's pension. Eligible partners must demonstrate that they lived with their partner for at least five years.

INADI received 62 discrimination complaints on the basis of HIV positive status, 34 of which were resolved rapidly. The law prohibits termination of employment of HIV positive employees.

=== Intersex rights ===
Intersex people in Argentina have no recognition of their rights to physical integrity and bodily autonomy, and no specific protections from discrimination on the basis of sex characteristics. Cases also exist of children being denied access to birth certificates without their parents being pressured into consenting to medical interventions.

== Labor rights ==
=== Right of association ===
The law provides all workers, with the exception of military personnel, the right to form and join "free and democratic labor unions, recognized by simple inscription in a special register," and workers exercised this right. An estimated 35 to 40 percent of the workforce was organized.

The Argentine Workers Central (CTA) and other labor groups not affiliated with the CGT contends that the Trade Unions Law provision for the legal recognition of only one union per sector conflicts with the International Labor Organization's (ILO) Convention 87 and prevents the CTA from obtaining full legal standing. In November 2008 the Supreme Court declared Article 41 of the Trade Unions Law unconstitutional and upheld the right of a workers' union lacking official legal recognition to elect its own delegates. In addition the ruling asserted that the Ministry of Labor's discretion in awarding official union recognition violates international treaties. The IACHR continues to review the CTA's 2004 petition to this day.

Unions have the right to strike, although those representing civil servants and workers in essential services are subject to the condition that undefined "minimum services" are rendered. In some cases "minimum services" have already been incorporated in union bargaining agreements, but since the law does not define "minimum services," civil servants and workers in essential services have the right to strike only after a compulsory 15-day conciliation process. Once that term expires, civil servants and workers in essential services must give five days' notice to the administrative authority and the public agency that they intend to strike. All parties then negotiate which minimum services will continue to be provided and a schedule for their provision. The public agency, in turn, must provide two days' notice to users about the intended strike. Other workers exercised the right to strike by conducting legal strikes.

=== Right to organize and bargain collectively ===
The law provides unions with the right to negotiate collective bargaining agreements and to have recourse to conciliation and arbitration. The Ministry of Labor, Employment, and Social Security ratifies collective bargaining agreements, which covers roughly 75 percent of the formally employed workforce. According to the ILO, the ratification process impedes free collective bargaining because the ministry considered not only whether a collective labor agreement contained clauses violating public order standards but also whether the agreement complied with productivity, investment, technology, and vocational training criteria. However, there are no known cases of government refusal to approve any collective agreements under these criteria.

There are no special laws or exemptions from regular labor laws in the three functioning export processing zones.

=== Prohibition of forced or compulsory labor ===
While the law prohibits forced or compulsory labor, including by children, there were isolated reports that such practices occurred.

In April police rescued 30 Bolivians, including children, who were working under exploitative conditions at a poultry farm in Capilla del Senor, Buenos Aires Province. In August 2008 the press reported that children and other workers were working in exploitative conditions at other farms owned by the same company. The provincial ministry of labor fined the company 364,000 pesos ($117,400) and was reviewing additional forced labor complaints, including two deaths, lodged against the company. Press reports indicated the company had not paid the fine by year's end.

In September 2008 an appeals court reversed a lower court decision dismissing a case of forced labor against the owners of a prestigious garment company that employed Bolivians working in sweatshops under exploitative conditions. The lower court had dismissed the case on the basis that the Bolivians were culturally predisposed to working under such conditions. The case remains under investigation.

In September 2008 a federal judge indicted the owner and the manager of a garment sweatshop that employed 50 Bolivians, including 20 minors. The judge froze 900,000 pesos ($290,000) in assets belonging to the owner and seized and transferred sewing machines to a social organization of the employees' choosing so they could continue working. The case remained pending at year's end.

A Buenos Aires city court released four individuals in 2008 on probation in a 2006 case of forced labor. According to a local antislavery NGO, the individuals were charged for their role in operating clothing sweatshops in the Flores Sur neighborhood that left six Bolivian citizens dead and affected potentially hundreds more.

=== Prohibition of child labor and minimum age for employment ===
The law protects children from exploitation in the workplace. In 2004 the National Commission for the Eradication of Child Labor (CONAETI) estimated that up to 1.5 million children, or 22 percent of children under the age of 15, worked in some capacity, an estimate still considered valid. In June 2008 the Congress passed a law raising the minimum age for employment from 14 to 15, which will increase to 16; in rare cases the Ministry of Education may authorize a younger child to work as part of a family unit. Children between the ages of 15 and 18 may work in a limited number of job categories and for limited hours if they have completed compulsory schooling, which normally ends at age 18. Legal penalties for employing underage workers ranged from 1,000 to 5,000 pesos ($303 to $1,515) for each child employed. Provincial governments and the city government of Buenos Aires are responsible for labor law enforcement.

Most illegal child labor takes place in the informal sector, where inspectors have limited ability to enforce the law. Child labor includes such work as small scale garment production, trash recycling, street sales, domestic service, and food preparation and agricultural production.

CONAETI conducts seminars with the 19 provincial commissions for the eradication of child labor to train provincial authorities responsible for enforcing labor laws and raising awareness regarding exploitive child labor. It also provides technical assistance to NGOs addressing child labor in the tobacco and trash-picking sectors, including workshops with tobacco producers to encourage corporate social responsibility on child labor issues. The government works with several NGOs to address the commercial sexual exploitation of children in the triborder area with Brazil and Paraguay, disseminating information on prevention and available assistance for victims. A trinational network involving local government and civil society was established in 2008 to help coordinate the antitrafficking efforts.

The government participates in the MERCOSUR "Nino Sur" ("Southern Child") initiative to defend the rights of children and adolescents in the region. The initiative includes unified public campaigns against commercial sexual exploitation, trafficking and child labor, mutual technical assistance, and the exchange of best practices related to victims protection and assistance.

The Ministry of Education also provides scholarships to reintegrate school dropouts and supported children who work and attend school. The program also provides parents with job search assistance and job training.

=== Acceptable conditions of work ===
The government increased the monthly minimum wage in October, bringing the total monthly minimum wage to 1,440 pesos ($387). This exceeded the estimated amount of 1,013 ($272) a month needed by a family of four to maintain a "decent" standard of living. Most workers in the formal sector earned significantly more than the minimum wage. The Ministry of Labor, which is responsible for enforcing legislation related to working conditions, continued inspections to get companies to register their informal workers. In November the Ministry of Labor reported informal urban unemployment at 40 percent. According to a 2007 ILO study, 60 percent of employed citizens ages 15 to 24 were engaged in informal labor. Federal labor law sets standards in the areas of health, safety, and hours. The maximum workday is eight hours, and the maximum workweek is 48 hours. Overtime pay is required for hours worked in excess of these limits. The law sets minimums for periods of rest, requiring a minimum of 12 hours of rest to start a new workday. Sundays are holidays, and those required to work on Sundays are paid double. However, laws governing acceptable conditions of work were not enforced universally, particularly for workers in the informal sector. The law requires employers to ensure their employees against accidents at the workplace and when traveling to and from work. Workers have the right to remove themselves from dangerous or unhealthy work situations without jeopardy to continued employment. However, workers who leave the workplace before it has been proven unsafe risk being fired; in such cases the worker has the right to judicial appeal, but the process can be very lengthy.
