= Quotaism =

Societal organization method

Quotaism is the concept of organizing society by a quota system, whether by racial, gender, language or another demographic attribute. Examples of quotas include gender quotas, racial quota, and reservations. The basic premise is to have demographics represented at all levels and aspects of the civilization according to national statistics.

A quota system is often part of any affirmative action policies, but in those cases it is mainly used as a "target", within a single entity. Quotaism applies to the whole country and is enforced by legislation on all public and private entities.

== Implementation ==
=== Bangladesh ===
- The Bangladesh Civil Service reserves 5% of its positions to the children of Bangladesh Liberation War veterans, 1% to the indigenous peoples in Bangladesh, and 1% to disabled people. There have been demonstrations by university students calling for a drastic reduction in these quotas, or their complete abolition.

=== Brazil ===
- Higher Education – In 2012, the Brazilian government introduced legislation for federal universities, where spots are reserved according to the racial make-up of each Brazilian state.

=== European Union ===
Directive (EU) 2022/2381 requires that all EU member states pass a national law by 28 December 2024 that requires that by 30 June 2026 women hold at least 40% of non-executive director positions and at least 33% of all director positions at listed companies.

=== India ===
- Reservation – a form of quota-based affirmative action directed by constitutional and statutory laws, half of all the vacancies in government is reserved based on caste, tribe or gender i.e. mainly marginalised indigenous SC/ST communities.
- Economically Weaker Section – 10% quota is given in colleges for undergraduate and postgraduate studies.
- Higher Education – The University Grants Commission (UGC) provides financial assistance to universities/colleges which adopts a reservation policy for admissions and recruitment.
- Sports Quota – Sports ability can be a criterion for being hired for none-sports positions.

=== South Africa ===
Local trade unions commonly use the term "Absolute representation" in this regard.

- BEE (Black Economic Empowerment) – Companies are scored based on the quota of black ownership, senior managers, training, as well as suppliers. These scores then translate into their ability to compete for government tenders.
- Affirmative Action – The SAPS (South African Police Service) operates a quota system policy for hiring and promotion. Positions will be left unfilled if the appropriate demographic candidate cannot be recruited, even if another qualified person is available.
- University Enrollment – First-year students are registered on a racial quota basis. In some cases there are different admission requirements for different demographics. For example: to study medicine at the University of Cape Town (UCT), white and Indian students require at least a 78% average on their National Senior Certificate, whereas black students only requires 59%. This is largely as a result of the quota system requiring privileged access for certain ethnic groups - In 2016 the University of KwaZulu-Natal quota for medical students is 69% black African, 19% Indian, 9% coloured, 2% white and 1% other.
- Sport – In 2013, then Sports Minister Fikile Mbalula has imposed quota systems in athletics, cricket, football, netball and rugby.

== See also ==
- Gender quota (disambiguation)
- Jewish quota
- Reserved political positions
- Tokenism
