= Domestic violence in Argentina =

Domestic violence in Argentina is a serious issue. Since the 1990s onwards, the Government of Argentina has taken steps to address this problem. However, the policies of Argentina have been criticized for being weak, primarily due to focusing on civil, rather than criminal dealing with this form of violence, and for stressing conciliation between victim and perpetrator. The policy dealing with domestic violence has also been made more difficult due to the decentralized nature of the country: Argentina being a federal state with 23 provinces has caused significant regional variation between provincial policies on domestic violence, with women across the country having differing levels of protection.

== Legal situation ==
Argentina's Ley Nacional 24.417, of 1994, was its first law on domestic violence. Under this law, domestic violence is defined as "injury or physical or psychological abuse"(lesiones o maltrato físico o psíquico) by family members. In 2009, a much broader law was enacted: Ley de protección integral para prevenir, sancionar y erradicar la violencia contra las mujeres en los ámbitos en que desarrollen sus relacion es interpersonales [Ley 26.485] (The Comprehensive Law on the Prevention, Punishment and Elimination of Violence against Women in their Interpersonal Relations [Law 26.485]). This new law defines many forms of domestic abuse that were not present in the former law.

== Public support ==
Public and private institutions offer prevention programs and provide support and treatment for abused women. In general, complaints of domestic violence are addressed in civil courts, which can secure protection measures, including banning a perpetrator from a victim’s home or workplace. In 2012, the Congress passed an anti femicide law imposing stricter penalties on perpetrators who kill their spouses, partners, or children as a consequence of gender based violence.

== See also ==
- Women in Argentina
- Crime in Argentina
- 2025 livestreamed murder in Argentina
