= Women in the Brazilian Congress =

The National Brazilian Congress has a bicameral system, with the Chamber of Deputies and the Federal Senate. Women are extremely underrepresented in both parts of the Congress. Between 1983 and 2015 women only made up on average 7.2% of seats in the Senate, and 6.2% of seats in the Chamber of Deputies. While the majority of seats on both the Senate and the Chamber of Deputies were held by male politicians.

The way people are elected as senators, the gender quotas, states, parties and blocs are all linked with women's representation. The same goes for the Chamber of Deputies mechanics, the gender quotas specific to them, the states and parties, in the deputies female representation.

== Senate ==
=== Senate mechanics ===
Every Brazilian state has three senators. There are 26 states and 1 Federal District, so 81 senators in the Senate. Senators are elected every eight years, but the Senate is renewed every four years. The way this process works is by renewing a third of the senators, and then two thirds. This means that 27 members are elected every eight years, and four years later 54 senators are elected for the same period. The elections are done in a majoritarian way, and states elect either one or two senators every four years. The idea behind having only three members per state is to represent the state in itself, and not the population. This gives all the states the same importance. In each state there are usually a maximum of 20 candidates running each time, but this number may vary depending on whether voters are electing one or two senators. When two senators are being elected, voters can also vote for two candidates of their preference.

=== Gender quotas and women's representation ===
Brazilian Senate in 2021

Gender quotas have been argued to have a great impact in women’s representation. Countries with closed lists, some sort of proportional representation and gender quotas are a great terrain to foster women’s representation. However, Brazil’s Senate does not have any of that in place. The election system is majoritarian, candidates run for their parties, but independently from one another. As for gender quotas, there are only the legislated candidate quotas. This means that the constitution requires a minimum number of women to be running in the Senate election. There are none legal sanctions for those that do not comply, or placement rules. Such decisions weaken the chance of women to be elected. Women have been underrepresented in politics throughout Brazilian history, with the first female senator being elected only in 1979, in the 46th legislation. Women’s representation in the Brazilian Senate has never gone over 20%, meaning that no more than 13 women were ever in power at the same time. Seeing that there are 81 senators, which represent all the states and their interests, there should theoretically be more female senators.

=== States, parties and blocs ===
Some states and parties are more prone than others to both run and elect women to be senators and deputies. For these current terms, Mato Grosso do Sul and Paraiba have women as 2 out of their 3 senators. While other states such as Rio de Janeiro and Santa Catarina have no female representation. This varies considerably every new election, as it depends on many factors, such as voter disposition towards women, and the candidates on the run itself. The Senate is very fragmented, with 16 parties in place. The biggest party representation in the Senate are the Brazilian Democratic Movement (MDB) and the Social Democratic Party (PSD), with 15 and 12 senators respectively. While four of MDB’s senators are female, no woman was elected from PSD. Even those that do make up the biggest portion of the seats do not have equal representation. Parties like the Progressive (PP), currently hold seven seats on the Senate, and four of those seats are female. While parties such as PODEMOS have no female representation, when they have nine senators in place. Differently from others, the Workers’ Party (PT) is the only one that has a voluntary gender quota in place, with gender parity in specific positions. Such findings then demonstrate that women’s participation in parties varies, and not always depends on the size of the party representation. Another part of the Senate are the blocs formed in order to pass legislation and policies. There are currently 12 blocs, which vary from the Majority Leadership to the Parliamentary Bloc United for Brazil. Women hold leadership positions in four of these blocs, with one of them being the Female Parliamentary Group. This group has been created and approved in the Plenary earlier 2021. It fends for women’s rights in every sphere. According to the leader, Simone Tebet, from MDB, it also keeps in mind the family, children, senior citizens and so on.

== Chamber of Deputies ==
=== Chamber of Deputies mechanics ===
There are 513 deputies in power. Deputies are elected by proportional representation. This is done through dividing all the votes by the number of seats available. The number found is the election quotient. Each party’s vote share comes from their specific candidate shares. The votes for a specific party are then divided by the election quotient, and the party quotient is settled. Such calculations are called large remainder Hare quota.

The deputies are all elected at the same time. An open list is used for voters to elect deputies. Meaning that citizens vote directly to the candidate they want to win. Hence, if a party has received 3 seats, which was calculated via LR-Hare quota, the 3 most voted candidates win. For the candidate to be allowed to be elected, they must reach at least 10% of the election quotient. Their term duration is of four years, and they can be reelected for an unlimited number of terms.

The federal deputies represent the population of each state, so their numbers vary. São Paulo, which has a large population, has elected 70 deputies. As for states such as Acre, Mato Grosso do Sul and Rio Grande do Norte, they each have 8 deputies. This allows for bigger states to have a bigger representation, while smaller ones have a proportionally smaller representation.

Brazilian Chamber of Deputies in 2021

=== Gender quotas and women's representation ===
The gender quotas in place are similar to the ones in the Senate. Legislated quotas ensure that the lists parties put out contain at least 30%, and maximum 70% of each sex of their candidates. A measure like this ensures that there are at least some women on the candidate run. There are no reserved seats for gender, therefore all seats are up to be taken by candidates of any sex. The legal sanctions for any party that does not follow the mandatory quota is that the sex which is being overrepresented is to be a bit less represented, and this is done through the removal of these candidates. In theory this is a system which should aid women’s underrepresentation, nevertheless many things, in reality, hinder it from reaching its goal. Such sanctions only are enforced when the party goes over the ceiling people one can have in their list. Currently this maximum is at 150% of the total seats available in each state. These findings indicate that parties can just not follow the gender quota rule, and will not get caught if their lists are shorter than 150% of the seats.

Women are still underrepresented, with only 15% of the total Chamber of Deputies being female. This means that out of the 513 seats available, women only occupy 78 of those. To pass any new law project, provisional measure and amendment in the Constitution there needs to be at least half of the seats’ approval. The latter needs even more, with 35 approval. With the current numbers, this translates to 257 votes, if there is a simple majority, and 308 votes if there is the 35. Women then are not even able to constitute half of the simple majority. They can be seen as tokens, since they alone cannot pass any sort of policy they would like.

Within the Chamber of Deputies there are 25 permanent commissions which each deal with a specific set of topics. There are dozens of other boards which are temporary. The permanent commissions which impact women directly are the ones of: women’s rights, human and minority rights, education, and social security and family. Out of the 25 commissions, six have women as their presidents. The women’s rights council also has their three vice presidents as women. Female representation, though still little, can be seen in almost every committee, with representatives that speak up and make their voices heard.

Female representation in the Chamber of Deputies over the years
Year	Women in the Chamber of Deputies (%)
1945-1950	0
1950-1954	0.33
1954-1958	0.31
1958-1962	0.92
1962-1966	0.49
1966-1970	1.22
1970-1974	0.32
1974-1978	0.27
1978-1982	0.95
1982-1986	1.46
1986-1990	5.34
1990-1994	5.57
1994-1998	7.02
1998-2002	5.65
2002-2006	8.58
2006-2010	8.77
2010-2014	8.58
2014-2018	9.94
2018-2022	15.01

=== States and parties ===
The Chamber of Deputies has 513 members currently holding office in this term. Due to the proportionality of the representation in the lower house, some states hold more seats than others. With this the comparison between them needs to be done by percentages. To illustrate, Acre holds 8 seats in the Chamber of Deputies, and has 4 female representatives in power currently. While Ceará, which has 22 seats, only has a single female deputy. The Federal District also holds 8 seats, and has a female majority, with 5 representatives. There is much variation, which depends on the candidates running for office, the state in which they are running, and the popularity of their parties. The Workers’ Party (PT), which is the party which holds most seats in this legislation term, has 10 of their 54 seats as female. The party which holds the second biggest seat share is the Social Liberal Party (PSL), with 52 overall seats, and also has 10 female deputies. The Progressive Party (PP), which is the third biggest party, holds 38 seats with 5 women representatives. Clearly the share is small for all of them, and it additionally demonstrates how the gender quotas do not work when the sanctions used are not reinforced. With each list having at least 30% female candidates, many more women should be elected, not the amount which stands.
