= Argentine quota law =

Argentine Quota Law

Argentine National Congress
- Territorial extent: Argentina
- Enacted: November 6, 1991
- Status: In force

The Argentine law 24,012 or Argentine quota law (Spanish: Ley de cupo) seeks to increase the number of women in government in Argentina, by setting quotas for the minimum representation of women on the ballots of each party at the legislative elections. The law was enacted in 1991, during the presidency of Carlos Menem, and was the first gender quota law to be passed in Latin America. Following Argentina's lead, eleven other Latin American countries have since introduced gender quotas to increase female representation at the national level.

== Description ==
The number of female legislators elected in the 1983 general election (the first election after the National Reorganization Process) was minimal. In 1989, legislation to ensure larger representation of women was introduced by the Radical Civic Union and supported by women legislators from other parties. After initial debate in September 1990, in November 1991 the bill was passed by a large majority of the Chamber of Deputies. President Carlos Menem also favored the proposal. It became law as an amendment to the National Electoral Code. Initially, only the women who were not allowed in the party list in the required quota could request in court the compliance of the law; it was amended later to allow any citizen to denounce parties that did not follow the quota.

The law sets a quota of female candidates for each party, which must be both an 80% of the total of candidates, and at least one for each third name in the rank. The success of the law is caused by the characteristics of the Argentine electoral system. The parties offer a closed list of candidates, with fixed ranks, and voters must vote for the whole list of a given party. The large district magnitude helps as well.

== Results ==
The quota law made a huge impact. The Argentine Chamber of Deputies initiated 64 female deputies in 1995, 76 in 2001, and 93 in 2005. The respective percentages were 24.9%, 30% and 36.2% of the plenum. The law did not initially apply in the Argentine Senate, which worked with indirect elections. The electoral system for the Senate switched to direct elections in 1995, dramatically raising the number of female senators, who accounted for 2.8% of the senate in 1995 and 33.3% in 2001. By 2007, 33% of deputies and 24% of senators in the Argentine legislature were female. Although the number of women in office has increased, Elisa Maria Carrio (2012) notes that the male politicians who still dominate Argentina's political parties often place the name of their wives or other female family members on ballots, with the expectation that they will have control over the women's actions once they are elected.

Most provinces of Argentina enacted similar laws for their domestic elections, each one fitting into the context of their local laws. Each province has a provincial legislature; as of October 2003, female deputies accounted for 27.9% and female senators accounted for 20.4% of provincial legislatures.

Following Argentina's lead, eleven other countries in Latin America and South America (Bolivia, Brazil, Costa Rica, Dominican Republic, Ecuador, Guyana, Honduras, Mexico, Panama, Paraguay, and Peru) adopted similar gender quota laws during the following decade, with varying effects on women's share of legislative seats. A twelfth country, Venezuela, also adopted a quota law, but later rescinded it. In the 2006 election, the quota law in Ecuador contributed to increasing the representation of women in the nation's legislature from 15% to 25%. In Honduras, the institution of a quota law helped increase women's share of legislative seats to 23% after the 2005 election, having been only 5.5% previously.

== See also ==
- Affirmative action
- Gender quota
- Feminism in Argentina
- Women in Argentina

== Bibliography ==
- Carrio, Elisa Maria (2012). "Argentina: A New Look at the Challenges of Women's Participation in the Legislature". In Ballington, Julie; Karam, Azza (eds.). Women in Parliament: Beyond Numbers. A Revised Edition (PDF). International Institute for Democracy and Electoral Assistance. pp. 164–172. ISBN 91-85391-19-0.
- Dahlerup, Drude (2012). "Increasing Women's Political Representation: New Trends in Gender Quotas". In Ballington, Julie; Karam, Azza (eds.). Women in Parliament: Beyond Numbers. A Revised Edition (PDF). International Institute for Democracy and Electoral Assistance. pp. 141–153. ISBN 91-85391-19-0.
- Hinojosa, Magda (2009). "Argentina's Women: Don't Cry For Us". In Gelb, Joyce; Lief Palley, Marian (eds.). Women & Politics around the world. ABC Clio, Inc. pp. 211–229. ISBN 978-1-85109-988-7.
- Htun, Mala N. (2012). "Women, Political Parties and Electoral Systems in Latin America". In Ballington, Julie; Karam, Azza (eds.). Women in Parliament: Beyond Numbers. A Revised Edition (PDF). International Institute for Democracy and Electoral Assistance. pp. 112–121. ISBN 91-85391-19-0.
