= Women in Argentina =

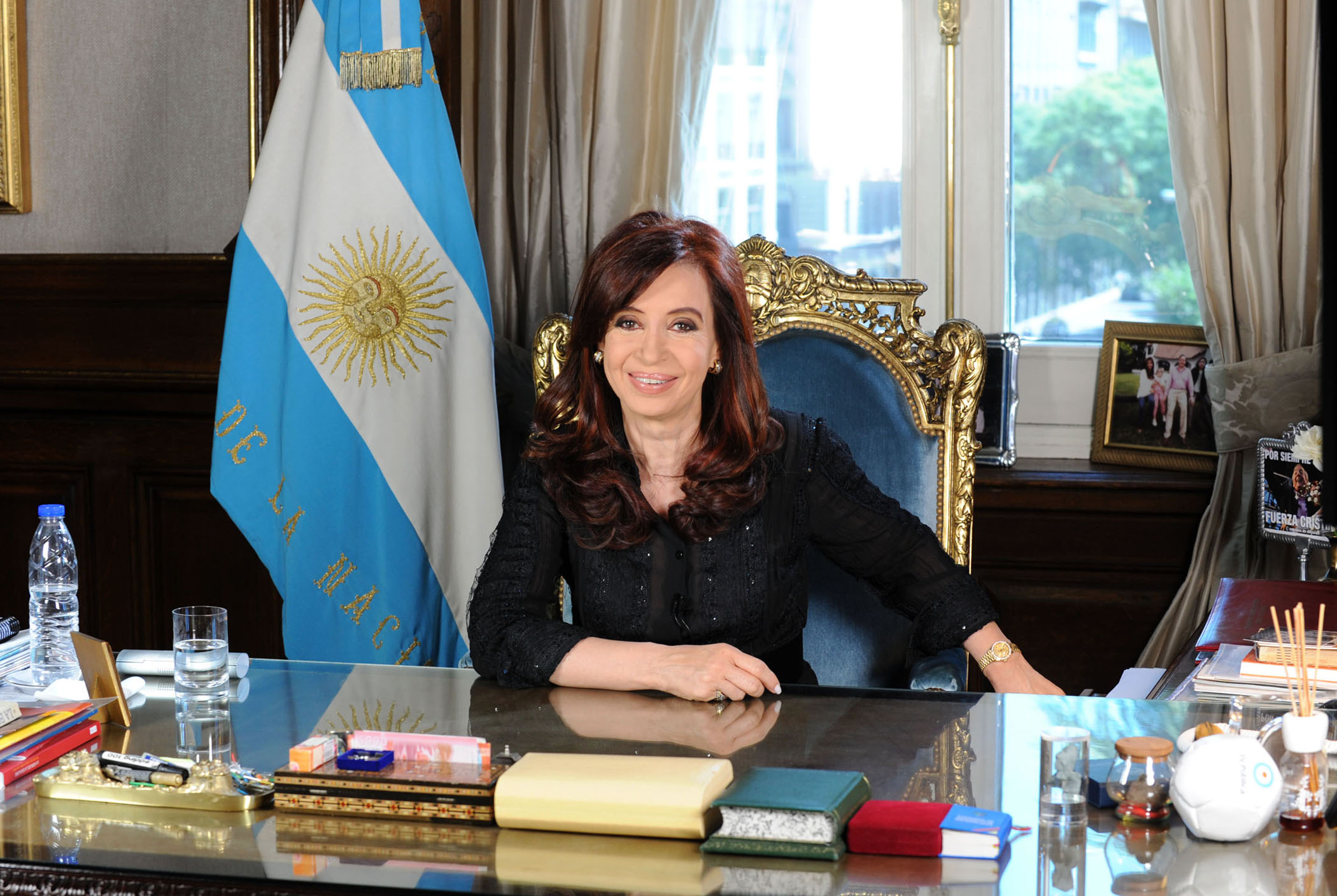
- Former President of Argentina Cristina Fernández served two full terms as President

General statistics
- Maternal mortality (per 100,000): 31.9 (2023)
- Women in parliament: 43% (2023)
- Women over 25 with secondary education: 65.9% (2010)
- Women in labour force: 47.3% (2017)

Gender Inequality Index
- Value: 0.287 (2021)
- Rank: 69th out of 191

Global Gender Gap Index
- Value: 0.762 (2025)
- Rank: 37th out of 148

The status of women in Argentina has changed significantly following the return of democracy in 1983; and they have attained a relatively high level of equality. In the Global Gender Gap Report prepared by the World Economic Forum in 2009, Argentine women ranked 24th among 134 countries studied in terms of their access to resources and opportunities relative to men. They enjoy comparable levels of education, and somewhat higher school enrollment ratios than their male counterparts. They are well integrated in the nation's cultural and intellectual life, though less so in the nation's economy. Their economic clout in relation to men is higher than in most Latin American countries, however, and numerous Argentine women hold top posts in the Argentine corporate world; among the best known are María Amalia Lacroze de Fortabat, former CEO and majority stakeholder of Loma Negra, the nation's largest cement manufacturer, and Ernestina Herrera de Noble, director of Grupo Clarín, the premier media group in Argentina.

Women, however, continue to face numerous systemic challenges common to those in other nations. Domestic violence in Argentina is a serious problem, as are obstacles to the timely prosecution of rape, the prevalence of sexual harassment, and a persistent gender pay gap, among other iniquities.

== Historical context ==
=== Nineteenth century ===
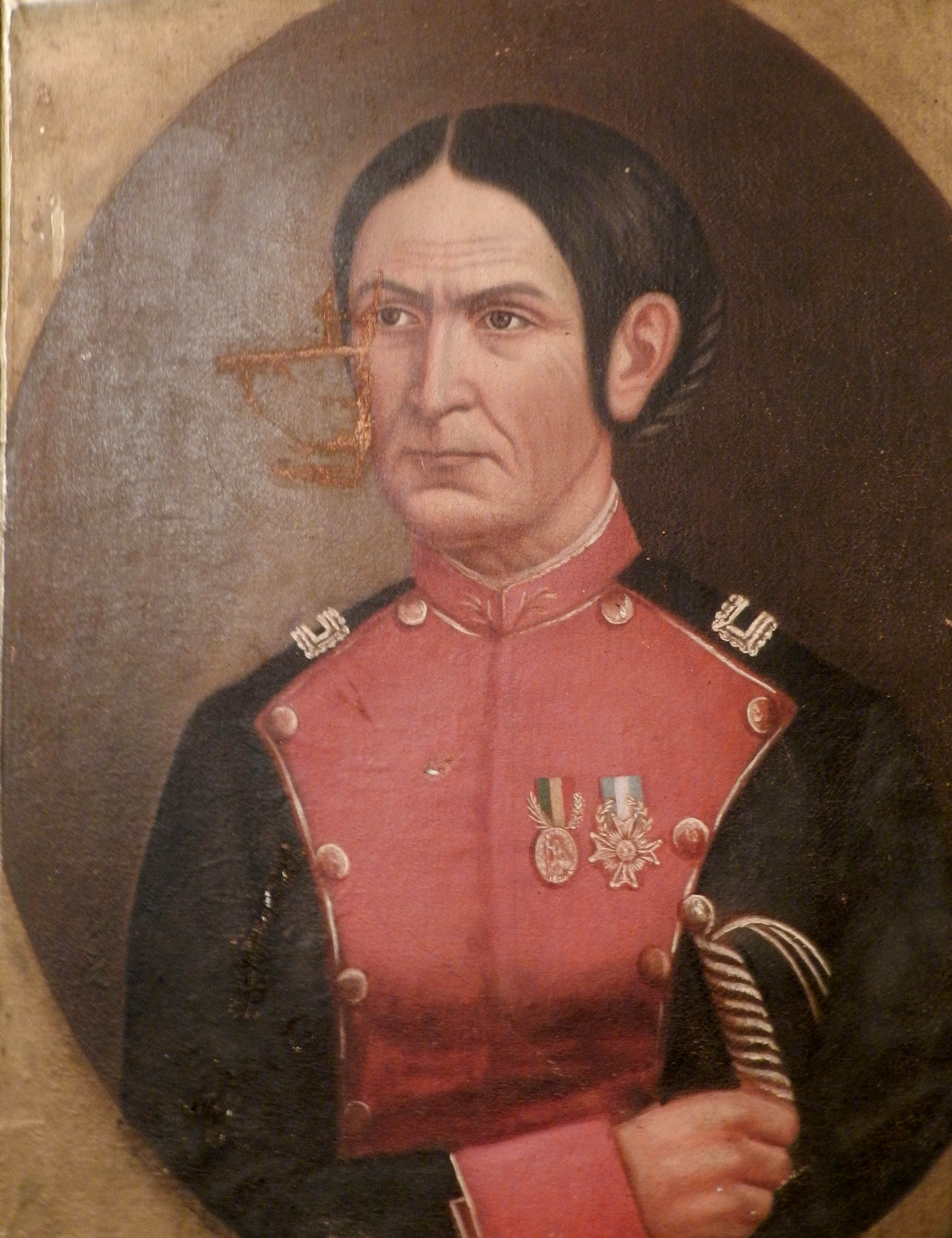
Juana Azurduy de Padilla, led independence fighters in the Rio de la Plata region

In the early nineteenth century, the Spanish crown ruled the region now encompassed by the modern countries of Argentina, Uruguay, and Paraguay, via the viceroyalty of Río de la Plata, with the capital in Buenos Aires. With the Napoleonic invasion of Spain in 1808, areas of the viceroyalty rose in revolt.

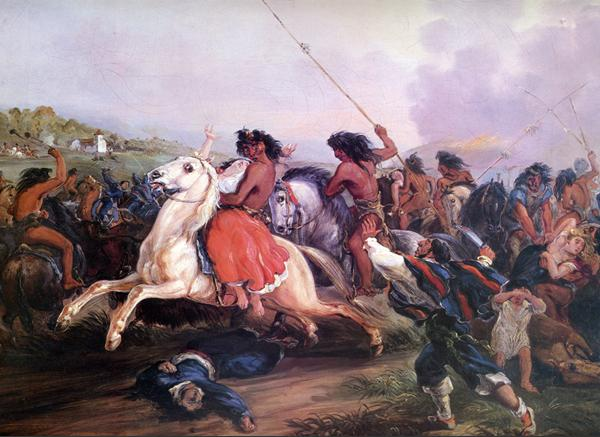
Abduction of a white Argentine woman, Doña Trinidad Salcedo by Araucanians painted by Johann Moritz Rugendas

One of the participants in the wars for independence was Juana Azurduy, who is honored now by both Bolivia and Argentina as contributing to independence. In 2009, Argentine President Cristina Fernández de Kirchner promoted Azurduy to the rank of general in the Argentine army from lieutenant colonel. The Argentine army named an infantry regiment based in the northern region of Salta as "Generala Juana Azurduy." In June 2014, President Fernández de Kirchner unveiled the new Argentine 10-peso note with the image of Azurduy.

Argentina in the early nineteenth century had few cities, but the port of Buenos Aires grew from a backwater of the Spanish empire into a major port in the late eighteenth century. Rural areas in Argentina were sparsely populated by the aboriginals and gauchos, mixed race men on horseback who hunted free-range cattle for their hides and to make dried beef. Non-indigenous women on the vast Argentine pampas were few, and depicted in art as vulnerable to abduction by "barbarian" Indians.

=== Twentieth century ===
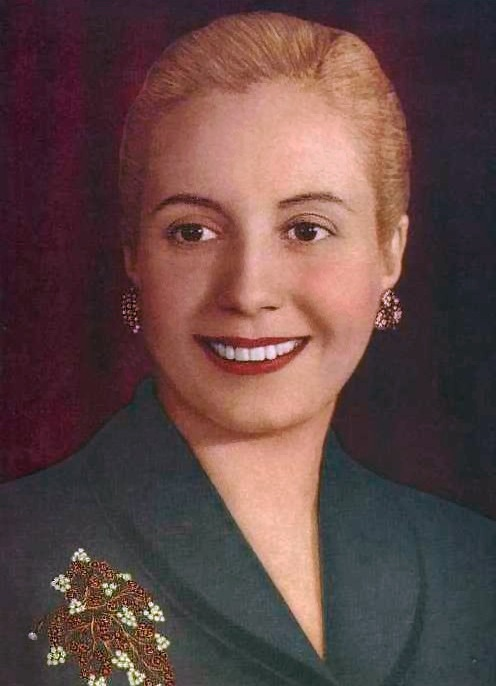
Eva Perón, 1947

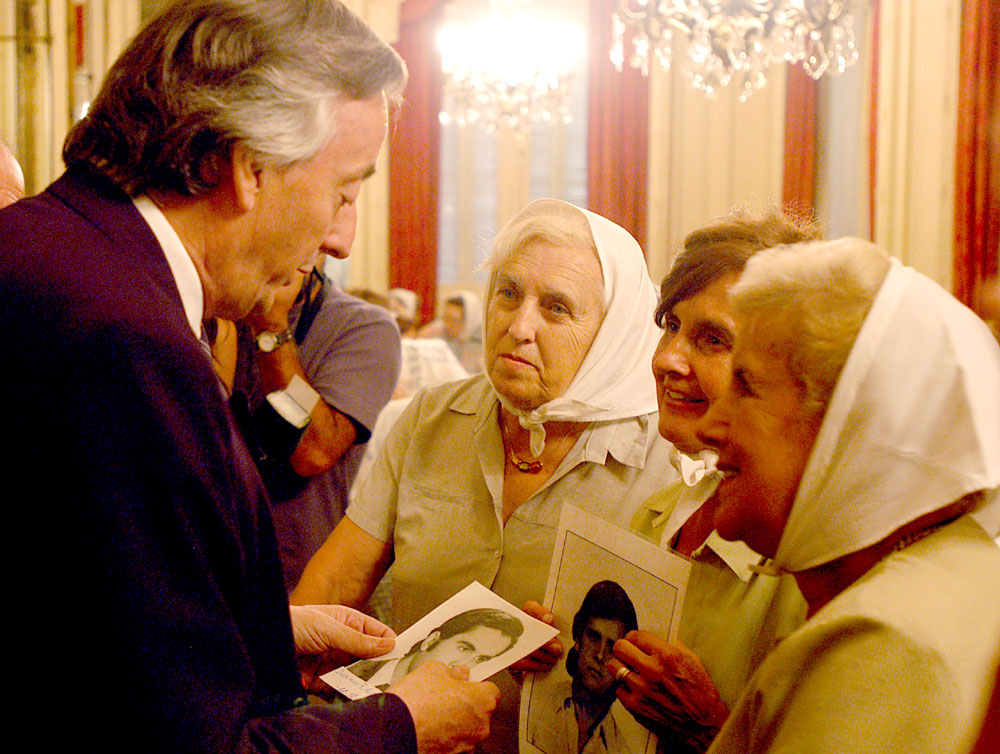
The Mothers of the Plaza de Mayo with President Néstor Kirchner

During the 1930s, Fanny Edelman, a Communist leader who was part of the International Brigades in defence of the Second Spanish Republic, became an international figure representing Communism and Feminism. She participated to the creation of the Women's Union of Argentina in 1937, and in 1972 she became head of the Women's International Democratic Federation. She was honorary president of the Communist party of Argentina until her death in 2011.

Following President Juan Perón's enactment of women's suffrage in 1949, First Lady Evita Perón led the Peronist Women's Party until her death in 1952, and helped enhance the role of women in Argentine society. Women played a significant role as both supporters and opponents of the National Reorganization Process, Argentina's last dictatorship, in the late 1970s, and the establishment of the Mothers of the Plaza de Mayo, an advocacy group led by mothers of the disappeared, was done by Azucena Villaflor de Vicenti and, mostly, other women, on the rationale that they would be less likely to be the targets of repression (Villaflor de Vicenti and her fellow founders were murdered by the regime in 1977). Women's rights in Argentina progressed in significant ways following the return of democracy in 1983. President Raúl Alfonsín signed laws in 1987 both limiting Patria potestas (the latitude given to a father regarding his treatment of fellow household members, particularly children) and legalizing divorce, helping resolve the legal status of 3 million adults living in legal separation. The Argentine quota law signed by President Carlos Menem in 1991 provides that one-third of the members of both houses of congress must be women, a goal achieved through balanced election slates. As of 2006, there were 29 women in the 72-seat Senate, 86 women in the 257-seat Argentine Chamber of Deputies, two female Supreme Court justices, and three women in the presidential cabinet. The President of Argentina, Cristina Fernández de Kirchner was elected in 2007; the runner-up in the crowded field was also a woman, Elisa Carrió.

== Family life ==
With regard to the organization of family life, Argentina has a history of social conservatism, and the influence of Catholicism in Argentina has been very strong throughout the 20th century. In Argentina, divorce was legalized only in 1987, and the legalization was the result of a struggle between different governments and conservative groups, mostly connected to the Catholic Church, that lasted a whole century. In 1987, President Raúl Alfonsín was successful in passing the divorce law, following a ruling of the Supreme Court. The new law also provided for gender equality between the wife and husband. By 1987, when divorce was legalized, only three other Latin American countries prohibited divorce (Paraguay and Colombia, which legalized it 1991, and Chile which legalized it in 2004). Adultery was decriminalized in 1995. Also, a new Civil and Commercial Code, modernizing family law, came into force in August 2015.

== Domestic violence ==
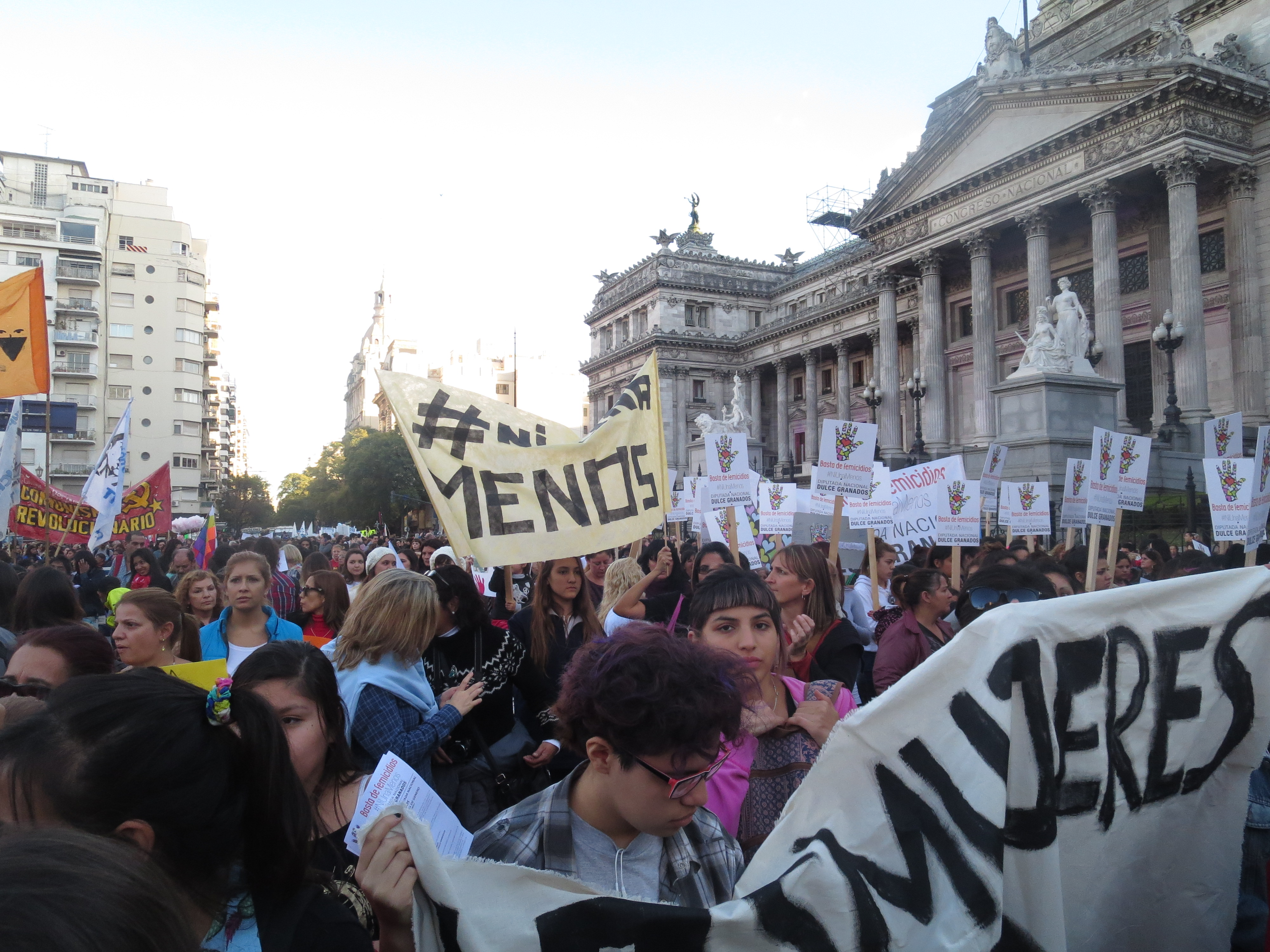
Mass protest against violence against women in Buenos Aires in 2015

Violence against women is a serious problem in Argentina. Amnesty International reported in February 2012 that a woman died every two days as a result of domestic violence in Argentina. The civil society organization La Casa del Encuentro reported that between January and September 2013, 209 women died as a result of domestic or gender-based violence.

In 2009, Argentina enacted Ley de protección integral para prevenir, sancionar y erradicar la violencia contra las mujeres en los ámbitos en que desarrollen sus relacion es interpersonales [Ley 26.485] (The Comprehensive Law on the Prevention, Punishment and Elimination of Violence against Women in their Interpersonal Relations [Law 26.485]).

In November 2012, the Congress passed an anti femicide law imposing stricter penalties on perpetrators who kill their spouses, partners, or children as a consequence of gender based violence.

According to the Human Rights Watch's 2018 world report, 254 femicides were reported, but only 22 convictions were done in 2016.

== Human trafficking ==
While individual prostitution is legal in Argentina, the promotion, facilitation, or forcing of people into prostitution is illegal. Argentina is a source, transit, and destination country for sex trafficking of women. Sex trafficking victims often come from Paraguay and the Dominican Republic.

== Rape and sexual harassment ==
Sexual harassment in the public sector is prohibited and is subject to disciplinary or corrective measures. In some jurisdictions, such as Buenos Aires City, sexual harassment may lead to the abuser's dismissal, but in others, such as in Santa Fe Province, the maximum penalty is five days in prison.

The law prohibits rape, including spousal rape; but the need for proof, either in the form of clear physical injury or the testimony of a witness, has often presented difficulties in prosecuting such crimes. Women's rights advocates have accused the police, hospitals, and courts of hostile attitudes against victims of sexual violence.

The 2009 law on violence against women (Law 26.485) has comprehensive provisions against sexual violence, including sexual violence within marriage (in particular Article 5(3)).

Before a change in law in 1999, sexual offenses were classified as "Offences against honesty", and the concept of "honest woman" appeared in certain sexual crimes. Act No. 25,087 of 1999 (Ley N° 25.087) reformed the legislation, and changed its name to "Offences against sexual integrity".

== Economic gender gap ==
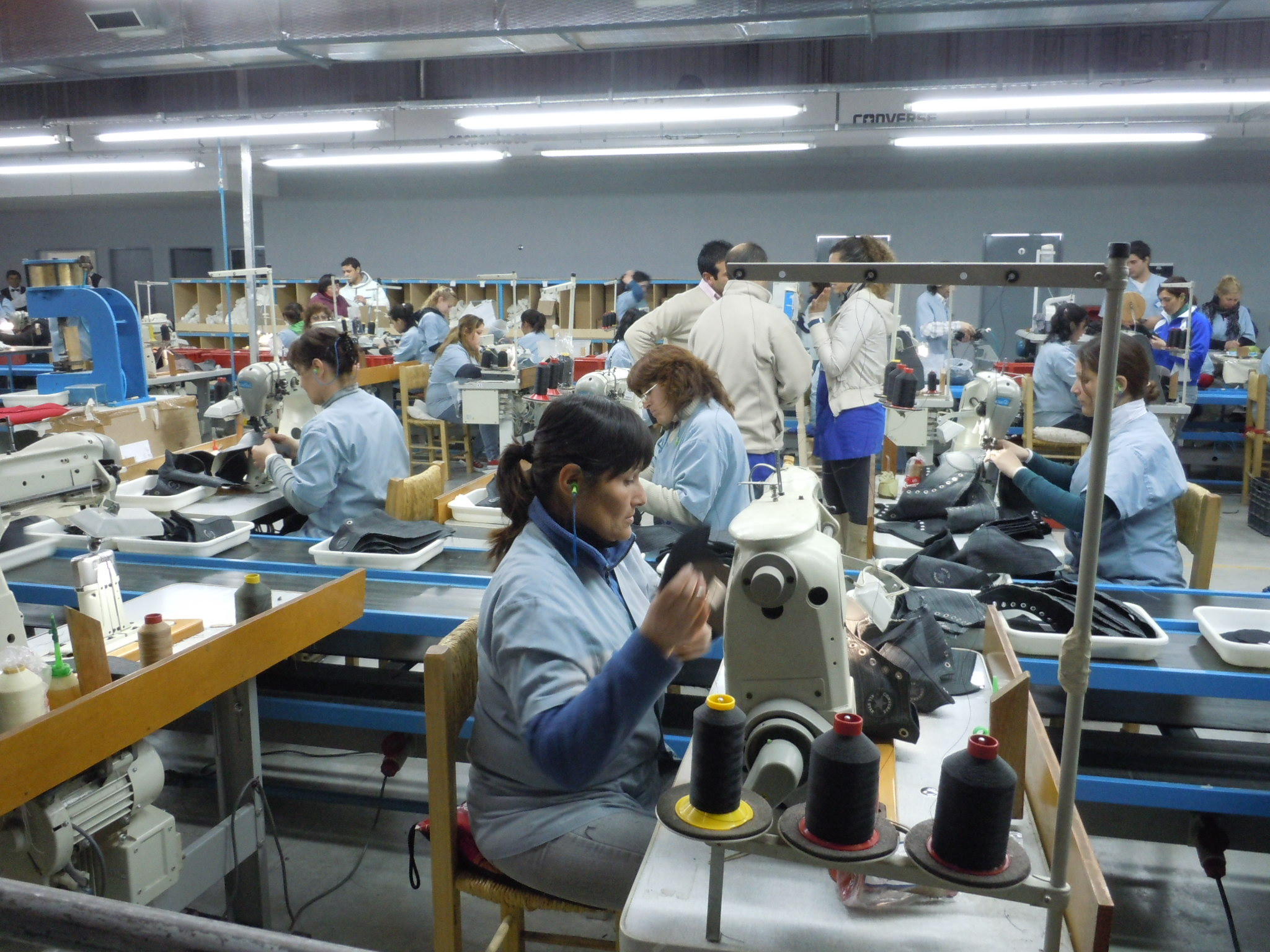
Women workers at a sportshoes factory in Las Flores, Buenos Aires Province, Argentina

Although since the 1869 enactment of the Argentine Civil Code, all citizens are considered equal, and the Constitution of Argentina also states at Section 16 that "The Argentine Nation admits neither blood nor birth prerogatives: there are neither personal privileges nor titles of nobility. All its inhabitants are equal before the law, and admissible to employment without any other requirement than their ability. Equality is the basis of taxation and public burdens", women often encounter economic discrimination and hold a disproportionately higher number of lower-paying jobs. Approximately 70 percent of women employed outside the home work in unskilled jobs, although more women than men hold university degrees. According to a 2007 study by the Foundation for Latin American Economic Research (FIEL), men earned 5 percent more than women for equivalent full-time work in the Greater Buenos Aires area, and earned 21 percent more than women for equivalent part-time work, an imbalance explicitly prohibited by law: prison terms of up to three years can be issued for discrimination based on gender.

== Abortion ==
Abortion in Argentina was legalized up to fourteen weeks of pregnancy on 30 December 2020. Previously it was prohibited, and was legal only in cases of rape, or when the woman's life or health was in danger. The Argentine Penal Code 846 had been amended in 2008 to place stricter sanctions against women who seek an abortion, as well as any medical staff involved in the act. These limitations notwithstanding, an estimated 500,000 abortions are performed annually in Argentina (compared to around 700,000 live births), resulting in at least 10,000 hospitalizations due to complications (estimates vary widely) and around 100 deaths (a third of all maternal mortality).

== Contraception and reproductive rights ==
Traditionally, access to contraceptives has long been discouraged by a succession of Argentine governments, which instead rewarded large families with subsidies rising disproportionately with the seventh child. Although Argentine women have long had among Latin America's lowest birth rates (averaging 2.3 births per woman in recent years), the policy has tended to encourage higher birth rates in the lowest strata of society (including women least able to afford large families). Contraceptives are widely used by sexually active Argentine women, as condoms are by Argentine men, and a variety of birth control products can be obtained freely in pharmacies; the Argentine government began their free distribution in 2003. In general, couples and individuals have the right to decide freely the number, spacing, and timing of children, and have access to information and reproductive health services. The law requires the government to provide free contraceptives.

== Women in politics ==
Traditionally, politics was seen a male domain. The legal and social roles of women in Argentina were mostly dictated by the Spanish Law (which itself was based on Roman law) and by the Catholic Church. As such, women were subordinated first to their fathers and then to their husbands. Today, however, women have a notable presence in Argentinian politics, and they make up almost a half of the parliament. Argentina became the first country in the world to approved a gender quota law in 1991 to increase female representation in parliament, expanding it in 2017 to achieve equal representation between men and women (50%). Argentina had two female presidents: Isabel Perón (1974-1976) and Cristina Fernández de Kirchner (2007-2015); four female vice presidents: Isabel Perón (1973-1974), Gabriela Michetti (2015-2019), Cristina Fernández de Kirchner (2019-2023) and Victoria Villarruel (since 2023). In 2007 the two most voted candidates in the presidential election were women: Fernández de Kirchner and Elisa Carrió.

== Advocacy and international law ==
The National Council of Women carries out programs to promote equal social, political, and economic opportunities for women. The council worked with the special representative for international women's issues, the Ministry of Labor, and union and business organizations to form the Tripartite Committee on Equal Opportunity for Men and Women in the Workplace, which seeks to foster equal treatment and opportunities for men and women in the job market.

In 1985, Argentina ratified the Convention for the Elimination of All Forms of Discrimination Against Women (CEDAW). In 1994, the National Constituent Convention incorporated the ratification of the CEDAW into the text of the new constitution. During the 1990s, some laws began to tackle domestic violence, by empowering police agencies and provincial judicial authorities to establish preventive measures. Although the Government of Argentina ratified the Inter-American Convention on the Prevention, Punishment and Eradication of Violence Against Women in 1996 (enacted in the 1994 Convention of Belem do Pará), not all Argentine provinces have promulgated regulations for its application. Despite the creation in 1985 of the Women's Department under the auspices of the Office of the President, provincial delegations or Women's Sections still have not been established throughout the entire nation.

== See also ==
- Feminism in Argentina
- List of Argentine women artists
