= Triple crime of Florencio Varela =

2025 killings in Argentina

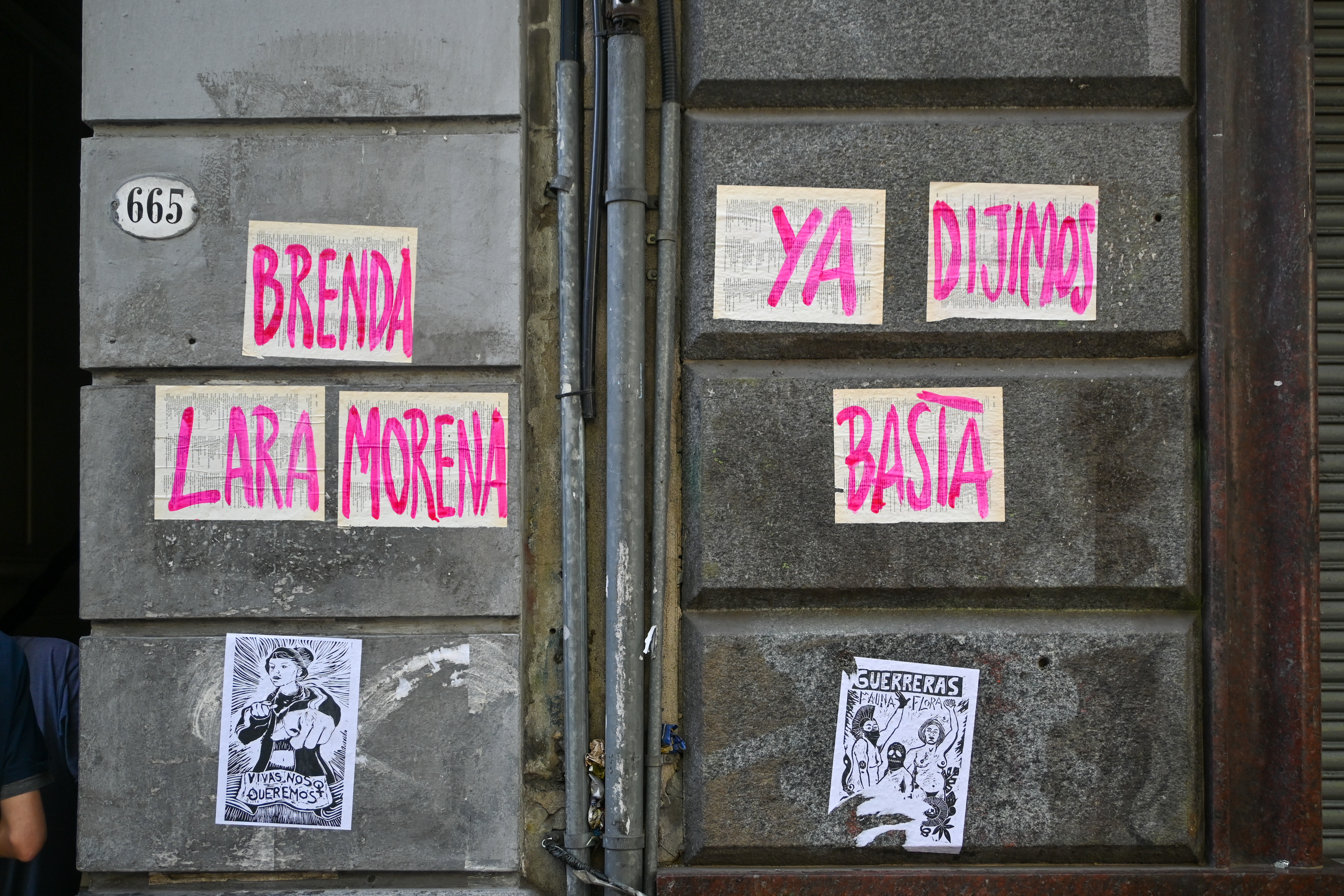
Posters bearing the names of Brenda, Morena, and Lara on Avenida de Mayo after a march held as part of the Global Day of Action for Access to Legal and Safe Abortion in response to the triple murder in Florencio Varela. Buenos Aires, Argentina.

On 19 September 2025, a triple murder of two young women and an adolescent girl took place in the city of Florencio Varela, outside of Buenos Aires, Argentina. The victims were livestreamed and tortured before they were killed. The discovery of the murders, which was linked to an international drug trafficking gang, provoked protests around the country.

== Background ==
According to reports, 20-year-old Brenda del Castillo and Morena Verdi, who were cousins, and 15-year-old Lara Gutiérrez disappeared on 19 September 2025 after being promised $300 for participating in a "sex party". They were driven to a house in a suburb of Buenos Aires.

== Murders ==
In the house the three women were tortured and killed; they were beaten, their fingernails were extracted and parts of their bodies amputated, and they were suffocated. Authorities say that many parts of the torture were livestreamed on Instagram and TikTok, to an exclusive audience of 45 people. Meta, the owners of Instagram, has stated that there is no proof the livestream took place on its platform.

== Investigation ==
The three dismembered bodies were discovered on 24 September 2025 in the backyard of a house in Florencio Varela. The bodies were discovered by tracing the women's cellphone signals; the livestream was revealed under questioning of a suspect. Authorities say the murder was meant to send a message of fear, as a gang leader is heard saying, "This is what happens to those who steal drugs from me." Police say one of the women allegedly stole a small package of drugs. As of 29 September the police had arrested six suspects, but reports say the mastermind of the murder, a Peruvian national, is still free.

On 1 October 2025, it was reported that Argentina police, suspect that a man by the name Tony Janzen Valverde Victoriano, also known as "Little J", is the mastermind behind the triple murder. Peruvian police reported they have arrested him along with his right hand man, in two separate operations.

== Public reaction ==
As the case became public, protests began, especially in Buenos Aires, where there were clashes with police. Marchers displayed the victims' names and photos, demanding justice and protection for women. Families, women's groups, and human rights activists denounced drug violence and femicide.

== See also ==
- Crime in Argentina
- Triple crime
