= Crime in Argentina =

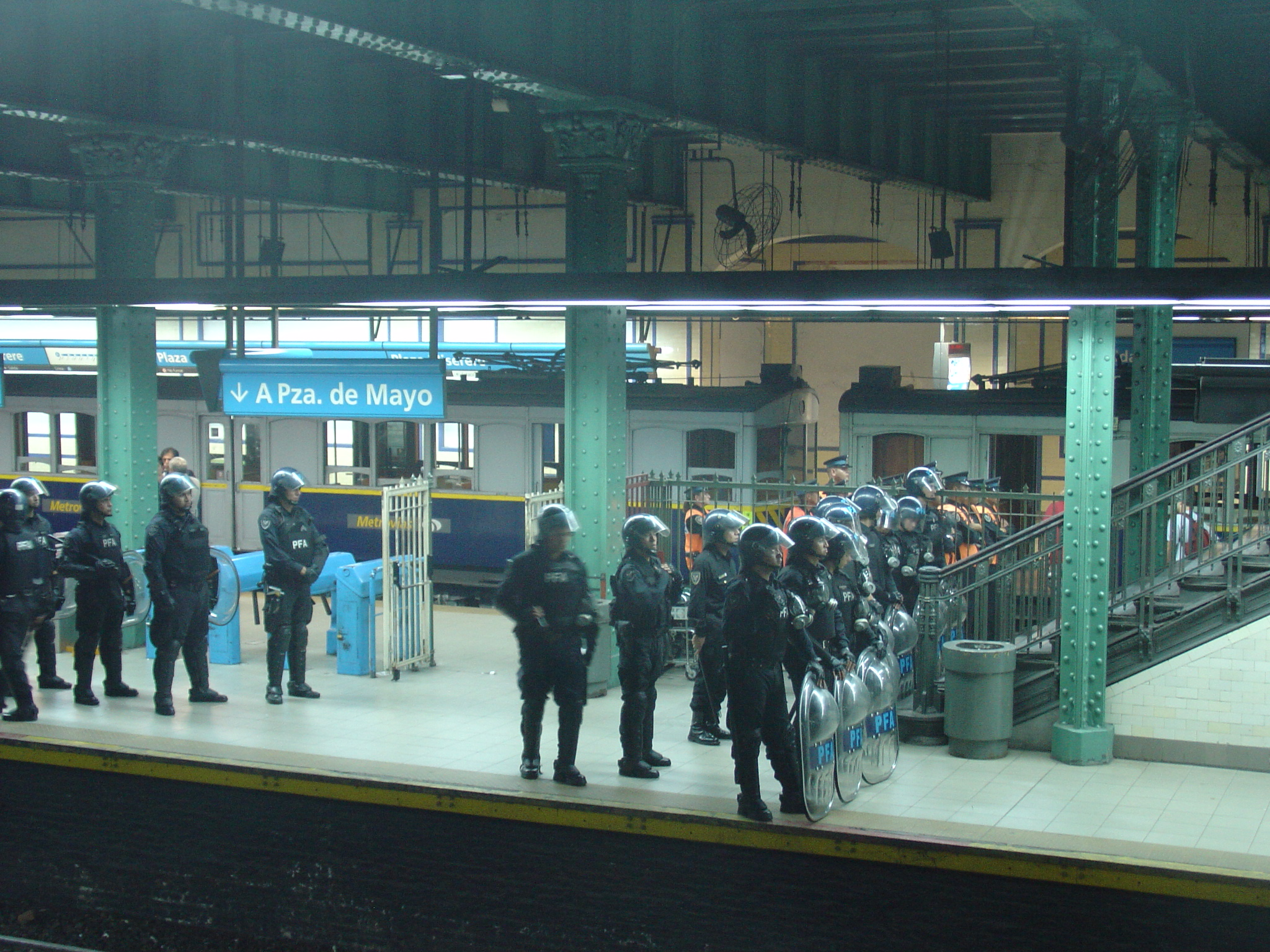
Argentine Federal Police at a train station in the Buenos Aires Underground

Argentina has among the lowest crime rates in South America and in all of Latin America. Although violent crimes like homicide are relatively low, other crime types such as theft remain significant concerns. For example, in 2023 the rate of reported thefts was "over 4,390 cases per 100,000 inhabitants". In 2024 the intentional homicide rate was about 3.8 per 100,000 inhabitants, the third lowest in Latin America.

== Crime by type ==
=== Murder ===
In 2016, Argentina had a murder rate of 5.94 per 100,000. There were a total of 2,605 murders in Argentina in 2016.

=== Corruption ===
Argentina has long suffered from widespread and endemic corruption. Corruption remains a serious problem in the public and private sector even though the legal and institutional framework combating corruption is strong in Argentina.

The New York Times reported in March 1996 that, "payoffs, kickbacks and government corruption are considered part of everyday life" in Argentina. Bribery and fraud are also found common among the private sector, and the lack of transparency in government regulations and laws has triggered an increased uncertainty among investors.

The Financial Times noted in 2013 that in Argentina corruption is widely considered to be "engrained," and "there is the sense that public officials are untouchable." In May 2013, sociologist Atilio Borón lamented that "the Argentinian is very accustomed to the idea that governments are corrupt, and does not seem shocked at acts of corruption," and that the corruption of politicians therefore does not prevent their reelection. "This is an economy that for the past 20 years has tolerated a legal drain of over 160 billion dollars," he added, "and this it now coming to take its revenge." A Center for the Investigation and Prevention of Economic Crimes (CIPCE) study concluded that public sector corruption alone cost the national treasury around US$10 billion from 1980 to 2006.

A major Argentine newspaper, La Nación, editorialized in October 2013 that although corruption has been a major problem in Argentina since the 1890s, it has been "on the increase" since the 1990s.

Diplomatic cables leaked in 2011 revealed that diplomats from the United States and several other Western countries had expressed deep concern about the current levels of corruption in Argentina. "Under President Cristina Fernández de Kirchner," reported The Heritage Foundation in 2013, "respect for markets and the rule of law has deteriorated and corruption has boomed."

According to Transparency International, Argentina has sufficient legislation and institutions dedicated to the prosecution of corruption in the public sector, but enforcement is highly inadequate, with the result that "impunity continues to trump integrity."

=== Domestic violence ===
Public and private institutions offer prevention programs and provide support and treatment for abused women. In general, complaints of domestic violence are addressed in civil courts, which can secure protection measures, including banning a perpetrator from a victim's home or workplace. In 2012, the Congress passed an anti-femicide law imposing stricter penalties on perpetrators who kill their spouses, partners, or children as a consequence of gender based violence.

== See also ==
- Triple crime of Florencio Varela
