= Gender quota =

Tool to increase women's legislative representation

A gender quota is a quota used by countries and parties to increase the amount of women or substantive equality based on gender in legislatures. Women are largely underrepresented in parliaments and account for a 26.9% average in parliaments globally. As of November 2021, gender quotas have been adopted in 132 countries. Around the world, quotas vary greatly in their enforcement and the stage of electoral process targeted, creating three main types of quotas: legislated candidate quotas, voluntary party quotas, and reserved seats. Regardless of their prevalence, they are a controversial measure, creating debates concerning their impacts, both negative and positive.

== Types of quota systems ==
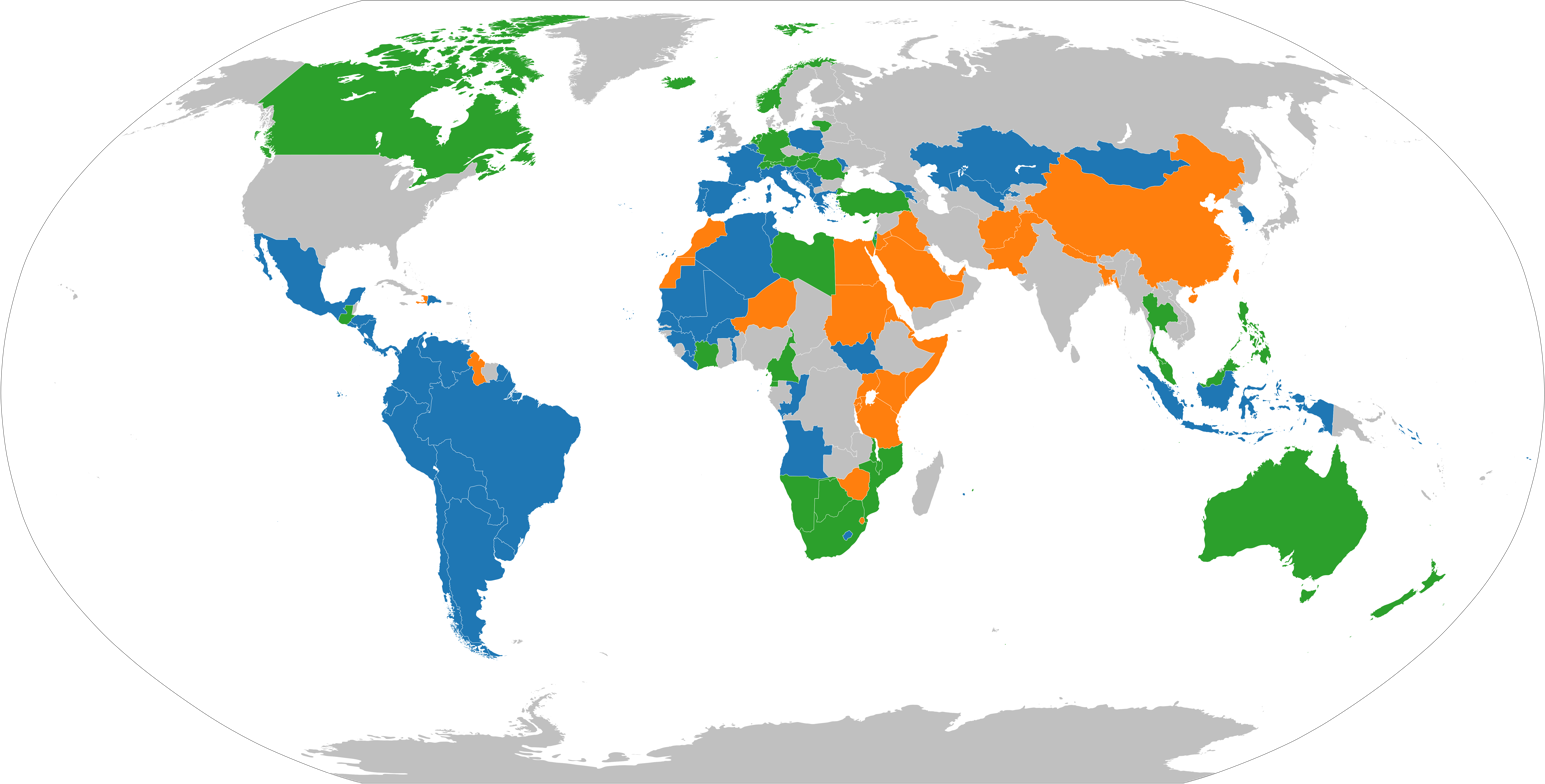
No quota Legislated candidate quota Reserved seats Voluntary party quota Use of Gender quotas by type, at the Single/Lower House Level

Developed by Drude Dahlerup, the definition of quotas contains two dimensions. The first examines what stage political recruitment process the quota targets. They can aim to increase the number of women who have considered running for office, the number of women candidates running, or women holding office. The second factor considers their enforcement, as quotas can either be required by law or voluntary, in which parties can choose to implement them. Based on these variations, there are three main types of gender quotas utilized around the world: aspirant quotas, candidate quotas, and reserved seats.

Different types of quotas
	What stage of the political recruitment process is targeted?		
How is the quota enforced?	Aspirant stage	Candidate stage	Elected stage
Legal quotas	Primaries	Candidate quotas	Reserved seats
Voluntary party quotas	Aspirant quotas (short list)	Candidate quotas	Reserved seats

=== Aspirant quotas ===
Considered the least used form of quota, aspirant quotas ensure that some women are nominated for candidacy by a political party, increasing the number of women moving from being eligible to run to being an aspirant. Aspirant quotas are adopted voluntarily on a party-by-party basis in single-member district systems. Examples of these policies include all-women shortlists in the United Kingdom and primaries.

Aspirant quotas are used so little because they are seen as having low effectiveness. One criticism is it targets the beginning of political recruitment, which doesn't guarantee an increase in women legislators. According to Professor Richard Matland, another difficulty of these policies is the local-central struggle for power over candidate selection. Aspirant quotas tend to be implemented by central parties to meet their demands, which can intrude on local party strength.

=== Legislated candidate quotas ===
Found in countries utilizing proportional representation, candidate quotas target the transition from aspirant to candidate by requiring parties to include a certain minimum percentage of women in their candidate lists. Candidate quotas are either statutory or voluntary. Legislated candidate quotas require all parties to abide by the rule and are commonly found in Latin America, such as the Argentine quota law. Thérèse Mailloux who serves as the Chair of the Board of directors for the Groupe Femmes Politique et Démocratie stated that approximately 25 of the top countries a part of the Inter-Parliamentary Union have implemented gender quotas by their constitution or as part of their law.

=== Voluntary party quotas ===
Voluntary party quotas leave it up to individual parties to implement guidelines regarding how many women are included on party lists. Predominantly found in Europe, these quotas are applied in systems with liberal political culture and left-leaning parties. Voluntary party quotas, like legislated candidate quotas, are most compatible with proportional representation systems. Since the policies are not legally enforced, their effectiveness varies greatly depending on party success and commitment to the policy. One example of a successful voluntary party quota is South Africa, in which the African National Congress committed to a quota and maintains high representation in the South African parliament.

=== Reserved seats ===
Reserved seats quotas guarantee the number of female legislators holding seats in legislature by setting aside a certain percentage of seats for women. Within reserved seats policies, seats can either be allocated by direction elections or appointments. These policies are implemented in the Middle East, Africa, and Asia.

== Case studies ==
These case studies will focus on countries who have implemented gender quotas or found alternatives to gender quotas.

=== Argentina ===
Prior to the establishment of a candidate quota in 1991, Argentina's Peronist party used internal party quotas to increase the number of women holding congressional seats. Because the party was so dominant, Argentina had one of the highest proportions of women in legislature in the world at the time.

In 1991, Argentina passed Law 24.012, the first national gender quota law in the world. The Ley de Cupos ("Law of Quotas") stipulates that the closed lists of candidates that parties present must have at least 30% women. It also requires that female candidates are placed in winnable spots on the list, which depended on the number of seats a party is renewing from the previous election. In most contexts, this meant at least one woman candidate for every two men. To ensure compliance, parties that do not present lists meeting these requirements are rejected.

In November 2017, Argentina made changes to its Electoral Code of 2012. By Law No. 27,412 Article 60, party lists were required to follow a zipper system, in which men and women alternated spots on the list. Because of this mechanism, party lists are required to have parity (50% women) in their composition.

As of November 1, 2021, there are 42.6% women in the Chamber of Deputies and 40.3% women in the Senate.

=== Canada ===
Canada’s system is based on voluntary party quotas allowing for each Canadian political party to hold their own stance on gender quotas. This is only if they wish to implement such quotas at all. The Progressive Conservative Party of Canada has yet to implement any structure or policies to increase female representation in their party. The Progressive Conservative Party believes that a gender quota would undermine a women’s merit and that government interference with a quota would invalidate the democratic system.

The New Democratic Party (NDP) has enforced a policy where during a federal election at least one female must be in contention for a nomination in each federal electoral district. Additionally, they adopted a goal to have at least fifty percent women candidates in a federal election. They also have a federal NDP Women Commission council and specific funding to advocate and support the participation of women in politics. In 1993, the Liberal Party of Canada aim to elect twenty-five percent women, although this has not been declared an official policy and is not strongly endorsed. Similar to the NDP, the Liberal Party has created a national women’s commission and a funding source to aid new female candidates. They have also implemented training for women interested in entering politics. The Green Party is currently led by a woman and holds a policy that fifty percent of their Party must be female candidates.

Although there have been no gender quotas implemented by the government in Canada, some provinces such as New Brunswick have established alternatives. In 2017, New Brunswick passed a law for gender-targeted public funding (GTPF) to become an incentive to increase female representation in New Brunswick politics. The GTFP policy functions by allocating funding to Canadian political parties based on the votes cast for women and men candidates in the previous election. In 2020, the party that benefited from this policy the most was the Green Party. The Green Party was able to achieve an equal slate of female and male candidates and increase their vote share by fifteen percent throughout the entire province. This in turn led to a ten percent increase in their annual subsidy received to fund their party.

The province of Quebec is another province that has implemented alternative strategies to increase the number of women who are elected in the province. The Quebec provincial government created and funds a program named “Decision-making: A Matter of Equality”. This program advocates for increasing the number of women who hold government decision-making positions. They try to achieve this by supporting projects to train women who wish to run for political office. Other groups such as the “Femme, Politique et Démocratie (FPD)” in Quebec and “Equal Voices” work with multiple levels of office in Canada. Both groups work to increase female nominations for candidates and work to elect more women to all levels of political office.

== Effectiveness ==
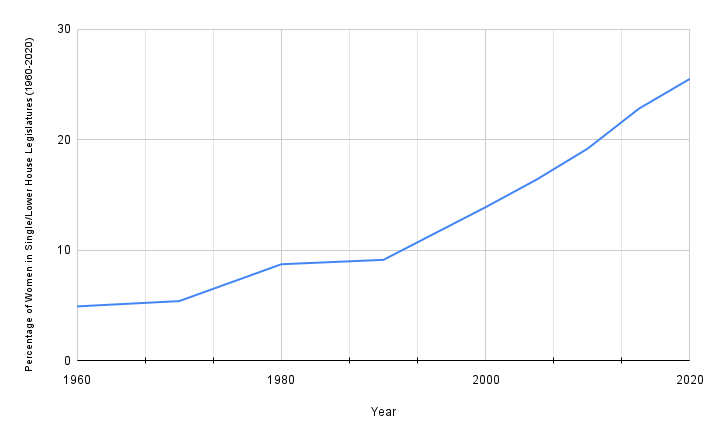
Percentage of women in unicameral and lower chamber legislatures from 1960 to 2020

In a 2008 paper by Aili Tripp and Alice Kang, quotas were found to have a positive and statistically significant effect on the number of women in single or lower house legislatures. They also found that voluntary party quotas and reserved seats had a significant, positive effect on women's representation, while compulsory party quotas did not have a significant effect. Reserved quotas were more effective than voluntary party quotas.

In 2015, Pamela Paxton and Melanie Hughes established that from 1990 to 2010, quotas became more effective over time in increasing women's representation. At the end of the period, quotas are twice as effective as at the beginning. They attribute this in part to a decrease over time in noncompliance and a rise in acceptance among elites. Like Tripp and Kang, Hughes and Paxton saw that reserved quotas were more effective than candidate quotas, finding them to be twice as effective.

The effectiveness of quota policies is influenced by many factors, including the context of the country it is adopted in. Because of this, there is no 'perfect' universal quota for increasing women's representation.

=== Placement mandates ===
Women's placement on party lists and electoral districts can impact how effective a quota is. In order for quotas to increase women's representation, women must be appointed to 'winnable' constituencies or seats on party ballots, where they have a plausible chance of being elected.

In proportional systems, the type of candidate list used by parties in elections can affect the number of women who are elected, whether or not there is a legislated candidate quota. Closed lists tend to yield more effective results than open lists. This is because systems with closed lists can implement placement mandates, which require parties to place women in electable positions on the list. In open list elections, voters select individual candidates based on their preferences, so placement mandates aren't a possibility.

There are several types of vertical placement mechanisms:

- A zipper system requires party lists to alternate candidates between men and women.
- Some countries such as Belgium stipulate that the top two candidates cannot be of the same gender, requiring a woman in the top two positions on the list.
- One out of a group of a certain number of candidates (e.g. 1 woman for every 3 candidates) must be a woman, such as in Argentina.

In majoritarian systems, quotas are effective if women are placed in winnable constituencies. For this to occur, proper horizontal placement mechanisms must be instituted based on previous party success or failure in those constituencies.

=== Enforcement mechanisms ===
To ensure political parties comply with gender quotas, countries can implement enforcement mechanisms into law that specify what the consequences are for parties that evade the quota. These laws encourage compliance with the quota, therefore resulting in more women being elected.

However, there is much variation in the level of the enforcement. In some countries, there is no penalty for refusing to comply with the quota. In other countries, parties are penalize for not abiding by the quota but can still run. Leslie Schwindt-Bayer explains that this creates an issue because parties can claim to not have found enough qualified women and continue to run mostly male candidates. The most strict enforcement of quotas rejects the lists of political parties that do not abide by the quota, preventing them from running in elections.

== Criticism ==
While quotas can be a useful tool in increasing women's representation in legislatures, they are also controversial policies.

Because some quotas require parties include a certain number of women be included on their lists, quotas can be viewed as undemocratic because voters aren't allowed to decide who is elected.

Pros and Cons of Quota Systems
	Criticism	Advantages
Equal Opportunity	Quotas give women preference over male candidates, so they don't follow the principle of equal opportunity.	Women face barriers in the electoral process, giving men preference over female candidates, so quotas rectify that inequity.
Single-Member Districts	Quotas can't work properly in single-member districts.	There are countries with SMD systems that use quotas, such as France, Mexico, and the United Kingdom.
Level of Democracy	Quotas are a violation of voter rights because they decide who is elected, not the voters themselves.	Political parties have authority over candidate placement and selection on party lists, so they don't violate voter rights. Quotas can make the nomination process more transparent, aiding democracy.
Merit	Quotas suggest that gender determines election of candidates rather than their qualifications, pushing out better qualified candidates.	Women are qualified enough for office but those qualifications are overlooked, so quotas help qualified women enter office and push out 'mediocre men'.
Stigma	Some women may not want to be elected based on their gender.	By increasing the number of women in a legislature, quotas decrease the stress that 'token women' face.

== Consequences ==
Outside of increasing women's representation in legislature, quotas can have effects on the women candidates, their peers, and their constituents.

=== Mandate and label effects ===
In countries that have adopted quotas, the female legislators elected via the quota policy may feel obligated to represent women, as that was part of the reason they were elected.

Another impact of the perception that women who are elected because of the quota were elected just because of their gender is "quota women" are seen negatively by their peers as less qualified and independent.

== See also ==
- Racial quota – Numerical requirements for hiring members of a particular racial group
- Gender parity – Statistical measure
- Women's Reservation Bill 2023 – 2023 constitutional amendment of India
