= Ernestina A. López =

Argentine educator and women's rights activist

Ernestina A. López de Nelson (1879–1965) was an Argentine educator and women's rights activist who served as Argentina's representative to the Inter-American Commission of Women from its founding in 1928 into the 1940s. She was the first woman in Argentina to earn a doctorate of letters and was a founder of the Argentine Association of University Women.

== Biography ==
Ernestina A. López was born in January 1879 in Buenos Aires, Argentina to Cándido and Adriana W. López. She began her teaching career and became Director of the Sarmiento Model School. In 1890, she founded the Liceo Nacional de Señoritas and thereafter served as its rector. In 1901, she earned the first doctorate degree issued to a woman in letters and philosophy from the University of Buenos Aires and in 1902 joined 31 other women including Petrona Eyle, Cecilia Grierson, Sara Justo, her sister Elvira López, Anna Pintos, and Elvira Rawson de Dellepiane to form the Argentine Association of University Women (Spanish: Asociación de Mujeres Universitarias de Argentinas (AMUA), as a means of addressing employment biases against women and female university graduates. The group actively worked to attain legal, civic and educational rights for women. In 1904 López attended the St. Louis World's Fair exposition as Argentina's delegate for the National Council of Education.

Beginning in 1908, the AMUA organized the First International Feminist Congress of Argentina (PCFIRA) (Spanish: Primer Congreso Femenino Internacional de la República Argentina) which ran from 18 to 23 May 1910. López was not only an attendee, but she presented the opening lecture of the conference to the nearly 1,000 attendants. As outlined by López, the goals of the Congress were to create a network women, beyond class and ideology, to support women's literacy and education, eliminate biases, work towards women's emancipation and free women from social and economic dependencies.

In 1918, López joined the Faculty of Philosophy and Letters of the University of Buenos Aires. Along with other prominent Socialists like Fenia Chertkoff and her sister Mariana Chertkoff, Alicia Moreau, Sara Justo, and Carolina Muzzilli, López advocated for schools to encompass feminist issues in their curriculum. Specifically, she advocated for classes on hygiene, sex education, citizenship and the responsibilities of voting, as well as horticulture and gardening. She felt that craftswork, being done by large numbers of urban women was better produced in the provinces, as part of the labor force instead of domestic make-work. In addition to teaching, she designed course curricula and published textbooks which were widely used. By 1925, López had married Ernesto Nelson, an educator and they later had one child, a daughter Alicia. In the 1930s, she helped Elina González Acha de Correa Morales promote the Club de Madres, one of the most active Argentine women's organizations, and served as its president for many years. As President of the Club de Madres, López became a member of the Argentine Government Commission of Child Welfare and worked with her husband on many social programs.

When the governing body of the Pan American Union created the Inter-American Commission of Women at their meeting in Havana on 4 April 1928. The provision called for a commission composed of seven women from the countries of the Americas and that those women should review data and prepare information to allow the Seventh Pan American Conference to consider women's civil and political equality in the region. It also called for expansion of the commission to eventually have one delegate for each country in the Pan American Union. Doris Stevens, who had suggested the commission was appointed as chair and the other six countries were selected by lot. The chosen countries were Argentina, Colombia, El Salvador, Haiti, Panama, and Venezuela and the appointed delegates were Dr. Ernestina A. López de Nelson from Argentina, María Elena de Hinestrosa from Colombia, María Alvárez de Guillén Rivas from El Salvador, Alice Téligny Mathon from Haiti, Clara González from Panama and Lucila Luciani de Pérez Díaz from Venezuela.

López de Nelson died in 1965.

== Selected works ==
Ernestina A. López de nelson. Nuestra Tierra. Cuarto libro de lectura.

López de Nelson's works were primarily elementary school primers and were all written in Spanish.

- López de Nelson, Ernestina A. (1903). Ensayo sobre Ricardo Gutiérrez (in Spanish). Buenos Aires, Argentina: Europea.
- López de Nelson, Ernestina A. (1907). La escuela y la vida: lecciones de pedagogía práctica (in Spanish). Buenos Aires, Argentina: Imprenta y Casa Editora de Coni.
- López, Ernestina A. (18 May 1910). Ideas feministas de Nuestra América (Speech). Primer Congreso Femenino Internacional de la República Argentina. Buenos Aires, Argentina.
- López de Nelson, Ernestina A. (1914). Elementos de botánica experimental (in Spanish). Buenos Aires, Argentina: Coni.
- López de Nelson, Ernestina A. (1926). En torno mío: primer libro de lectura corriente (in Spanish). Buenos Aires, Argentina: Coni.
- López de Nelson, Ernestina A. (c. 1920). Veo y leo: primer libro de lectura y escritura (in Spanish). Buenos Aires, Argentina: Coni.
- López de Nelson, Ernestina A. (c. 1920). Nosotros: segundo libro de lectura (in Spanish). Buenos Aires, Argentina: Coni.
- López de Nelson, Ernestina A. (1940). La señorita Raquel: tercer libro de lectura (in Spanish). Buenos Aires, Argentina: Imprenta y Casa Editora de Coni.
- López de Nelson, Ernestina A. (1950). Nuestra tierra: cuarto libro de lectura (in Spanish). Buenos Aires, Argentina: Coni.

== Sources ==
- Carlson, Marifran (1 August 2005). ¡Feminismo!: The Woman's Movement in Argentina. Chicago Review Press. ISBN 978-1-61373-337-0.
- Girbal-Blacha, Noemí María; Mendonça, Sonia Regina de (1 January 2007). Cuestiones agrarias en Argentina y Brasil: conflictos sociales, educación y medio ambiente. Prometeo Libros Editorial. ISBN 978-987-574-200-0.
- Lee, Muna; Cohen, Jonathan (2004). A Pan-American Life: Selected Poetry and Prose of Muna Lee. Univ of Wisconsin Press. ISBN 978-0-299-20234-7.
- Martin, Percy Alvin (1935). Who's Who in Latin America: A Biographical Dictionary of the Outstanding Living Men and Women of Spanish America and Brazil (1 ed.). Stanford University Press. ISBN 978-0-8047-2315-2.
- Miller, Francesca (1991). Latin American Women and the Search for Social Justice. UPNE. ISBN 978-0-87451-558-9.
- Montserrat, Marcelo; Andermann, Jens (2000). La ciencia en la Argentina entre siglos: textos, contextos e instituciones. Ediciones Manantial. ISBN 978-987-500-051-3.
- Pan American Union (January–June 1922). "Bulletin of the Pan American Union". LIV. Washington, DC: Government Printing Office.
