= Asociación de Mujeres Universitarias Argentinas =

Women's organization in Argentina

Asociación de Mujeres Universitarias Argentinas (AMUA) (Association of Argentine University Women) was a women's organization in Argentina, founded in 1904. It was one of the first feminist organizations in Argentina, and played a significant pioneering role in the campaign for women's suffrage in Argentina.

The organization was founded by a group of educated women, including Julieta Lanteri, Cecilia Grierson, Sara Justo, Elvira Rawson de Dellepiane and Ernestina López and Elvira López.

It is known for having arranged the First International Women's Congress (Primer Congreso Femenino Internacional) in Buenos Aires in 1910, a Pan-American Congress with delegates from the rest of Latin America.
