= Cecilia Grierson =

Argentine physician

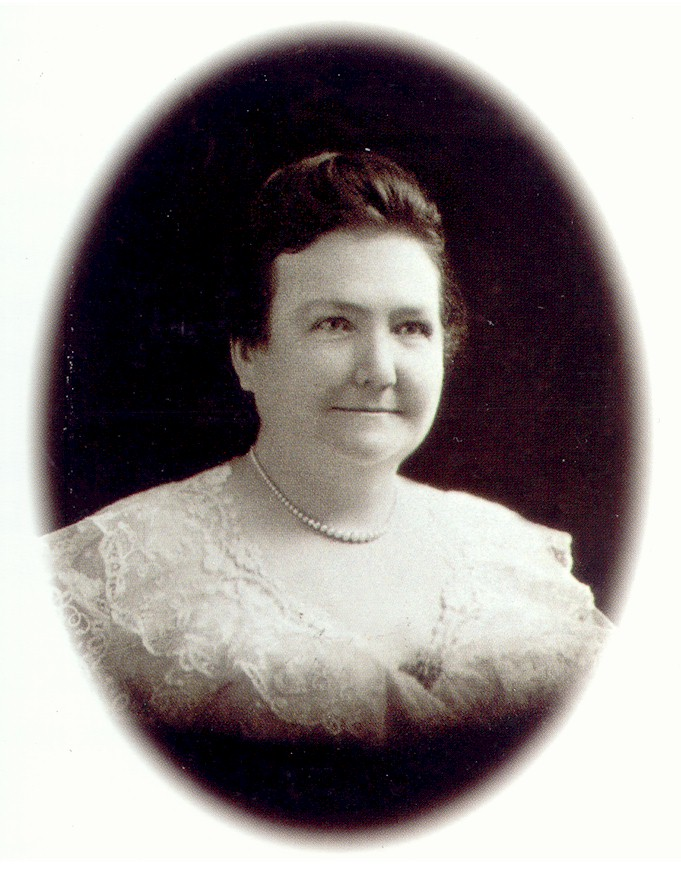
- Grierson, c. 1910
- Born: 22 November 1859; Buenos Aires, Argentina
- Died: 10 April 1934 (aged 74); Buenos Aires, Argentina
- Education: University of Buenos Aires

Cecilia Grierson (22 November 1859 – 10 April 1934) was an Argentine physician, reformer, nurse educator, feminist and prominent Freethinker. She had the distinction of being the first woman to receive a Medical Degree in Argentina.

== Early life ==
Cecilia Grierson was born in Buenos Aires in 1859 to Jane Duffy, an Irish Catholic woman, and John Parish Robertson Grierson, a Scottish-Argentine Protestant. Her paternal grandfather William Grierson, a native of Mouswald in Dumfriesshire, was among the 220 Scottish colonists who arrived in Buenos Aires in August 1825 from Leith to settle Monte Grande.

Grierson spent her early childhood on her family’s estancia in Entre Ríos Province, where her family were prosperous farmers. At the age of six she was sent to attend English and French schools in Buenos Aires, but had to return home on the early death of her father. She assisted her mother in managing a country school, and eventually taught there. Grierson returned to Buenos Aires to enroll when she was fifteen, at the Nº 1 Girls Normal School, where she graduated as a teacher in 1878. She was appointed by Domingo Faustino Sarmiento as a teacher at a nearby boys’ school, and after a bereavement of a dear friend, Grierson decided to study medicine.

== Medical career ==
Grierson faced entrenched opposition to her enrollment in medical school in 1883, including a supposed requirement for Latin, which was only taught in certain boys schools, and she was asked to provide written justifications for her motivation to become a doctor. Another woman, Élida Passo, had entered the Faculty of Medicine to pursue a degree of Doctor of Pharmacy, becoming in 1885 the first Argentine woman to earn a university diploma in Argentina. Passo overcame numerous rejected applications and returned to earn a Medical Degree. She became seriously ill while in the fifth year of medical school, however, and died in 1893 without a diploma.

Women were barred from the Faculty of Medicine at the nation's four universities in operation at the time; indeed, few women in 19th century Argentina enrolled in formal secondary education. Grierson, however, was an exceptional student, volunteering as an unpaid assistant at the university laboratory, and in 1885, beginning her internship under the auspices of the Public Health Department. She organized an ambulance service while with the department, introducing the use of alarm bells (equivalent to today’s sirens), an innovation that until then had been exclusive to the fire brigade. Her work during an 1886 cholera epidemic garnered her widespread acknowledgment for her efficient work in caring for patients in the Isolation Unit (in present-day Hospital Muñiz).

Grierson was also a pioneer in kinesiology. She introduced a course in massage therapy at the Faculty of Medicine, and later articulated her ideas in her textbook, Practical Massage. The book was widely read and played a key role in the development of modern kinesiology in Argentina. She joined the staff at the important Hospital Rivadavia in 1888, and graduated in 1889 upon her successful defense of her thesis on gynecology: Histero-ovariotomías efectuadas en el Hospital de Mujeres desde 1883 a 1889 (Ovary Extractions at the Women’s Hospital, 1883-1889). Grierson thus became the first woman in Argentina to earn a Medical Degree.

She joined the medical staff at Hospital San Roque (today Hospital Ramos Mejía) upon graduation. She also offered classes in anatomy at the Academia de Bellas Artes, and provided free psychological and learning consultations for children with special needs, particularly blind and deaf mute children. She also finished her textbooks: La educación del ciego (The Education of the Blind), Cuidado del enfermo (Patient Care) and Primer Tratado Nacional de Enfermería (First National Nursing Textbook).

Grierson founded the first nursing school in Argentina, the Nursing School of the Hospital Británico de Buenos Aires, in 1890. Student nurses attended classes on childcare, first aid and treatment of patients. This initiative led, in 1891, to the creation of the Nursing School, which Grierson directed until 1913. This success helped make her a founding member of the Argentine Medical Association (1891). Encouraged by the reports of the Third International Conference of the Red Cross on first aid training, she created the Argentine First Aid Society in 1892, publishing a book on the care of accident victims.

Taking part in 1892 in the first cesarean section performed in Argentina, she founded the National Obstetrics Association in 1901, and its journal, Revista Obstétrica. She also gave gymnastics lessons at the Faculty of Medicine and mentored the few other female students that had enrolled; one of these, Armandina Poggetti, in 1902 became the first woman in Argentina to earn a degree in Pharmacology.

Grierson founded the Society for Domestic Economy in 1902. This organization, later renamed the Technical School for Home Management, was the first of its kind in the country, and in 1907, she instituted the Domestic Sciences course at the Buenos Aires Girls’ Secondary School (the first such course in Argentina). Following her 1909 report on improving conditions in Europe regarding education, living standards, and the availability of vocational schools, the National Education Council approved a curriculum for vocational schools in Argentina. Grierson published Educación técnica de la mujer (Women’s Technical Education), introducing the study of day care in these schools. She held teaching positions in the School of Fine Arts and the National Secondary School for Girls, where she taught from its inception in 1907. The Argentine government named her as a representative to the First International Eugenics Conference, held in London in 1912.

== Feminist activism ==
The harassment Grierson endured as a medical student and afterward helped make her a militant advocate for women's rights in Argentina. She joined the recently established Socialist Party of Argentina, and became one of a relatively small number of Argentine women in academia or from high society who supported feminism and the women’s emancipation movement that had developed in the United States and the United Kingdom.

Grierson was named Vice President of the second meeting of the suffragist organization, the International Council of Women (ICW), held in London in 1889. This led her to establish the Argentine Women’s Council (CNM) in 1900. The CNM, in the person of Grierson and Elvira Rawson de Dellepiane, presented a draft bill in 1906 to the National Congress providing for the creation of funds for social welfare benefits and maternity leave for working-class women. The bill was not passed, however, nor was another measure drafted by Grierson banning the white slave trade.

Rifts developed within the CNM, however. Alvina Van Praet de Sala, the president, arranged for a priest to attend all their meetings, a decision which was opposed by Grierson and her allies. These began to identify themselves more closely with feminism and to promote a more vigorous campaigns in favor of women’s suffrage. Some thirty university and professional women, including Grierson, broke with the more conservative Catholic line in the CNM. They, among them Grierson, Elvira Rawson de Dellepiane, Julieta Lantieri Renshaw, Alicia Moreau de Justo, Ernestina A. López and other prominent women from academia, co-founded the Association of Argentine University Women (AMUA), the first university student association for women in the country, in 1904. The AMUA sought to engage with the problems of working-class women as much as with those of female university graduates. They campaigned against women’s inferior legal status, their exclusion from civic activity and lack of access to education relative to men. They also campaigned for civil and political rights, the rights of children (particularly illegitimate children), legalized divorce; and against alcoholism, prostitution, and gambling. Grierson presided over the First International Women’s Conference, organized by the AMUA. Grierson was an active supporter of the Argentine Freethinkers Association (AALP), which advocated rationalism, anticlericalism, a scientific approach to life, and full equality for women. The AALP sought to join the CNM, but were rejected on account of their anticlerical views. This provoked a new confrontation between Grierson and the membership of the CNM, upon which she joined the Women’s Socialist Centre. Grierson chaired the First International Feminist Conference of Argentina organized by the Association of University Women during the Argentine Centennial, in 1910. This provoked her departure from the CNM, which, with official support, had organized the rightist First Patriotic Women’s Congress. Grierson articulated her opposition to a turn to the right on the part of Argentine feminists in her 1910 treatise Decadencia del Consejo Nacional de Mujeres de la República Argentina (Degeneration of the Argentine National Women’s Council).

== Later life ==
Grierson was publicly honored in 1914 on the occasion of the silver jubilee of her graduation, an homage repeated in 1916, when she retired from academia. She lived in scenic Los Cocos, Córdoba Province, during her retirement, practicing family medicine on a largely pro bono basis and teaching. She inaugurated a school in the rural town, as well as a residence for teachers and artists. She was allowed credit for only a few years' service upon her retirement and received but a modest pension; she lamented most, however, that she was never offered the position of Chair of her alma mater's Faculty of Medicine, which she attributed to misogyny, as a single woman. A noted academic and activist throughout her life, Grierson died in Buenos Aires in 1934, at age 74, and was buried in the city's British Cemetery, (See also the English page of: Cementerio Británico).

== Tributes ==
The nursing school she established in 1891 was renamed for her following her death. A street in Los Cocos and one in the newest district of Buenos Aires, Puerto Madero, were also named in her honor.

On November 22, 2016, Google celebrated her 157th birthday with a Google Doodle.

A new 2,000 peso banknote, due to Argentina's high inflation, has been designed with Grierson and Ramón Carrillo on the front.

The first locally-developed Covid-19 vaccine in Argentina, approved in October 2023, was named in Grierson's honor.
