= Petrona Eyle =

Argentine doctor and feminist (1866-1945)

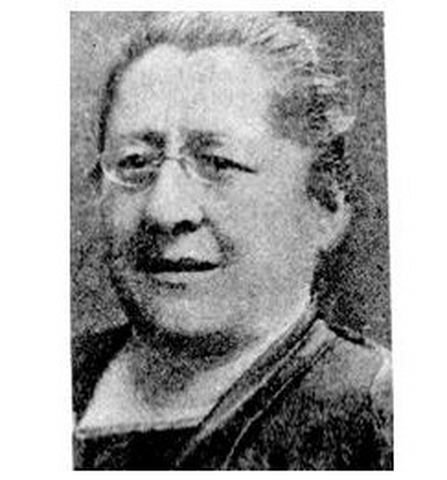
- Born: 18 January 1866; Baradero, Argentina
- Died: 12 April 1945 (aged 79); Buenos Aires, Argentina
- Occupations: Physician, activist

Petrona Eyle (18 January 1866, Baradero, Argentina – 12 April 1945, Buenos Aires) was an Argentine physician and feminist who campaigned for Latin American women's rights. She studied medicine at the University of Zurich, where she wrote her thesis on ear deformities, and in 1893 became the second woman to practice medicine in Argentina after Cecilia Grierson.

Eyle helped found the Consejo Argentino de Mujeres (transl. 'Argentine Council of Women'), the Asociación Universitarias Argentinas (transl. 'Association of Argentine University Women'), and the Liga contra la Trata de Blancas (transl. 'League against the White Slave Trade'). She also participated in various conferences for the benefit of women and children and served as the editor of the periodical Nuestra Causa (transl. 'Our Cause'). She died in Buenos Aires on 12 April 1945.

== Early life and education ==
Petrona Eyle was born in Baradero, Argentina on 18 January 1866. Her father was German medical professional. (Note: Barrancos says that he was a pharmacist while both Palermo and López say that he was a military surgeon.) Her mother, María Romero, was an Argentine, and died when she was young. Several sources, including sociologist Alicia Itatí Palermo and journalist Alberto López, also mention that she was of Swiss ancestry. She traveled to Montevideo, Uruguay after her mother's death, where she attended a Catholic elementary school. (Note: Moretti offers a different version, claiming that Eyle studied and attended church at the Cristiana Evangélica del Río de la Plata (transl. 'Evangelical Christian Church of the Río de la Plata') alongside other Swiss immigrants in the town.)

Eyle received her teaching degree from the Escuela Normal de Concepción del Uruguay (transl. 'Normal School of Concepción in Uruguay') in 1879, and in 1887, she traveled to Switzerland to study medicine at the University of Zurich, which was one of the first European universities to accept women starting in 1868. She graduated in 1891. Her thesis was titled Anomalías de las Orejas de los Delincuentes (transl. 'Ear Anomalies of Criminals').

After revalidating her degree at the University of Buenos Aires, Eyle became the second woman to practice medicine in Argentina after Cecilia Grierson. She worked in various public hospitals in Buenos Aires and joined the Asociación Médica Argentina (transl. 'Argentine Medical Association'), which had been founded in 1891 to promote scientific communication and regulate medical activity in the country.

== Activism ==
During the 1900s, Eyle began actively associating with various feminist organizations. In 1901, she helped to establish the Consejo Argentino de Mujeres. She also presided over the German Woman's Home from 1901 to 1903 and helped to create the Argentine Asociación Universitarias Argentinas, (Note: Various dates are given for the establishment of the Asociación. Bryce lists the date as 1902. Laba and Tort list the date as 1904, and Bustelo and Varela list the date as 1908.) which advocated for various reforms before the National Congress of Argentina. Reforms introduced by the Asociación addressed a variety of issues, including maternity protection, social security, and teachers' retirement. In 1907, Eyle corresponsed at length with Uruguayan feminist Paulina Luisi. In addition to encouraging her to form an Uruguayan branch of the Asociación, which she did later that year, and expressing support for women's suffrage, Eyle also talked to Luisi about practicing medicine, including the economic logistics of assisted childbirth.

The Asociación also organized the Primer Congreso Femenino Internacional (transl. 'First International Women's Conference') in Buenos Aires in 1910, on the centennial anniversary of the May Revolution, with Eyle serving as chair of the conference's organizing committee. Luisi and Grierson both attended, alongside other notable figures such as Sara Justo, Ada María Elflein, Alicia Moreau de Justo, Fenia Chertkoff, Marie Curie, and Maria Montessori. The conference, which aimed to unite women from around the world, was attended by 185 women, with representatives from major trade associations, advocacy groups, and socialist organizations all present.

Eyle participated in several conferences centered on children's rights and welfare during the 1910s. The first took place in Buenos Aires in 1913. Topics discussed included the role of men and women in childcare and education, legal reforms to prevent juvenile delinquency, and hygiene reforms to reduce infant mortality and address children's behavioral issues. The second was the Primer Congreso Americano del Niño (transl. 'First American Congress on the Child') in Buenos Aires in 1916, where proposals for child labor regulations and menstrual leave were discussed.

As of 1918, Eyle was a part of the Unión Feminista Nacional (transl. 'National Feminist Union') founded by Alicia Moreau de Justo, an organization founded to unite different segments of the Argentine feminist movement. Eyle served as the first editor of the organization's periodical, Nuestra Causa, which ran from 1919-1921. Explaining the periodical's purpose, Eyle wrote that:

The feminist movement is no longer an isolated manifestation of a few exalted, eccentric women who inspired repulsion; it is now a worldwide evolution, which nothing and no one will be able to suppress. It is necessary to study these manifestations and above all women must know what feminists intend. This is why we call on the supporters of feminism and feminists.

During Eyle's tenure, the periodical published numerous articles in opposition to the "white slave trade," a term used to refer to the trafficking and sexual enslavement of white women. Conversely, according to gender researcher María Soledad De León Lascano, coverage of the topic declined after Eyle left her editorial position.

Eyle was also the secretary of the Comité femenino de Higiene Social (transl. 'Women's Social Hygiene Committee') as of 1920, and in 1924, she founded the Liga contra la Trata de Blancas, which worked to end the white slave trade and promote the rights of children. As part of her work with the Liga, she presented a report on child sexual abuse to President Marcelo Torcuato de Alvear, outlining various ways in which children were mistreated as part of the trade.

== Death and legacy ==
Eyle died in Buenos Aires on 12 April 1945. A street in the Puerto Madero neighborhood of Buenos Aires is named for her, and on 18 January 2021, Google celebrated her 155th birthday with a Google Doodle.
