= Mazzilli =

Mazzilli is a surname. Notable people with the surname include:

- Agustín Mazzilli (born 1989), Argentine field hockey player
- Frank Mazzilli (born 1962) Canadian politician
- Lee Mazzilli (born 1955), American baseball player
- L. J. Mazzilli (born 1990), American baseball player
- Ranieri Mazzilli (1910–1975), Brazilian politician

== See also ==
- Carolina Muzzilli
