= Sara Justo =

Argentine educator and dentist

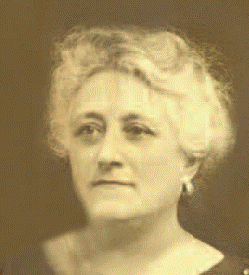
- Born: 5 February 1870; Buenos Aires, Argentina
- Died: 6 October 1941 (aged 71); Buenos Aires, Argentina
- Education: Dental School of University of Buenos Aires
- Occupations: Dentist, educator
- Known for: Women's rights activism
- Relatives: Juan Bautista Justo (brother)

Sara Justo (5 February 1870 – 6 October 1941) was an Argentine women's rights activist, educator and dentist. She was a leader in the women's rights movement of Argentina early in the 20th century, supporting women's suffrage and co-founding both the Women's Pro-Suffrage Committee and the Feminist Center of Argentina. She was one of the first four women dentists in Argentina, graduating from the University of Buenos Aires in 1901.

== Early life and education ==
Sara Justo was born in Buenos Aires on 5 February 1870 to Aurora Castro and Juan Felipe Justo. She had nine siblings, including her brother Juan Bautista Justo, who went on to form the Argentine Socialist Party.

Justo was one of the first students at the newly created Dental School at the University of Buenos Aires. She graduated in July 1901 and was one of the first four women dentists in Argentina alongside Leonilda Rosa Meneclier, Catalina Marni, and Antonia Arroyo. She was a practicing dentist for a time, but soon turned her focus to social issues such as women's rights and education. She directed the Paula Albarracín de Sarmiento Professional School for Women (now ET Nº8 Paula Albarracín de Sarmiento), teaching classes in childcare and home economics.

== Women's rights and social movements ==
Justo was one of the leading figures of the women's rights movement in Argentina. She promoted the Association of Argentine University Women, which was founded in 1904 by Cecilia Grierson and Petrona Eyle.

In 1905, Justo founded the Feminist Center of Argentina with Julieta Lanteri and Elvira Rawson. At the International Congress of Free Thought in Buenos Aires in 1906, Spanish feminist politician Belén de Sárraga suggested that Justo organize a movement to secure women's political rights. In 1907, Justo founded the Women's Pro-Suffrage Committee with her future sister-in-law, Alicia Moreau, to "promote the intellectual, moral and material emancipation of women, whatever their social conditions". Justo had some ideological differences with Moreau, mostly over how to achieve suffrage. Justo preferred a staged approach while Moreau preferred universal suffrage.

With Lanteri, Alicia Moreau, Petrona Eley, and Rawson, Justo prepared a petition on women's rights. Socialist politician Alfredo Palacios presented the petition to the Argentine Chamber of Deputies in 1911. It formed the basis for the Civil Rights Act of 1926.

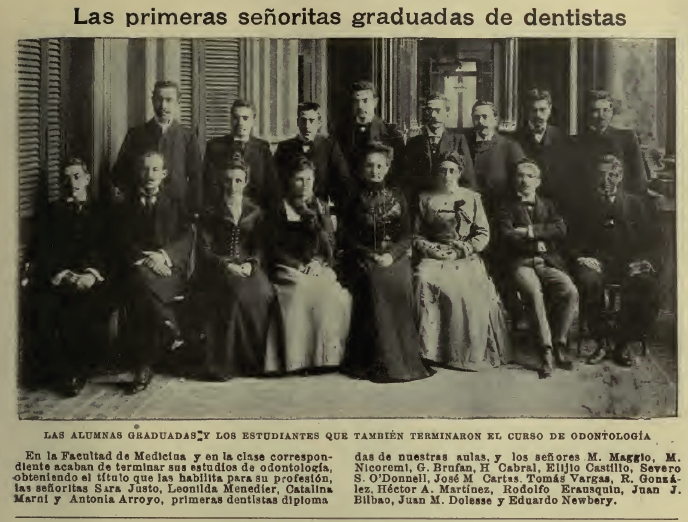
Sara Justo with the first graduating class of the Dental School

Justo published numerous articles on feminism in periodicals such as the Buenos Aires newspaper El Diario. She also voiced her position on women's suffrage in 1909 at a conference on the feminist movement in Europe.

The Association of Argentine University Women organized the First International Women's Congress in 1910 with Justo serving as the treasurer. Justo was a delegate of the National Association of Teachers to the 1925 meeting of the International Congress of Social Economy and attended the Third International Women's Congress in 1928.

Justo died on 6 October 1941 in Buenos Aires.
