= Elvira López =

Elvira López may refer to:

- Elvira López (feminist), Argentine feminist and author
- Elvira López (actress) (born 1966), Chilean actress
