= Julieta Lanteri =

Argentine doctor and activist (1873–1932)

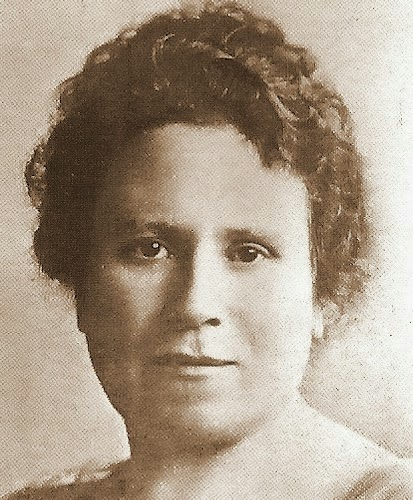
- Born: Giulia Maddalena Angela Lanteri; 22 March 1873; Briga Marittima, Kingdom of Italy
- Died: 25 February 1932 (aged 58); Buenos Aires, Argentina
- Education: University of Buenos Aires
- Spouse: Alberto Renshaw

Julieta Lanteri (born Giulia Maddalena Angela Lanteri, 22 March 1873 — 25 February 1932) was an Argentine physician, leading freethinker, and activist for women's rights in Argentina as well as for social reform generally.

== Early life and education ==
Julie Madeleine Lanteri was born in rural Briga Marittima, in the Province of Cuneo, Italy (today La Brigue, France). Her parents, Mattea Guido and Pierre-Antoine Lanteri, emigrated to Argentina with their two daughters in 1879, and she was raised in Buenos Aires and La Plata.

She became, in 1891, the first woman to enroll at the Colegio Nacional de La Plata, a public college preparatory school. Earning a degree in pharmacology at the University of Buenos Aires in 1898, Lanteri enrolled in the university's School of Medicine with permission from the Dean, Dr. Leopoldo Montes de Oca. She would encounter opposition to her career as both a student and a professional by conservatives; objections included the broader concept of allowing women to pursue a career, as well as more petty ones such as that a woman should not examine a cadaver. These experiences led Lanteri and Dr. Cecilia Grierson (the first woman to earn a Medical Degree in Argentina) to co-found Asociación de Universitarias Argentinas, the first university student association for women in the country, in 1904. Following an internship at the women's ward at San Roque Hospital, Lanteri became, in 1907, only the fifth woman in Argentina to earn a medical degree, and the first Italian Argentine woman to do so.

== Work ==
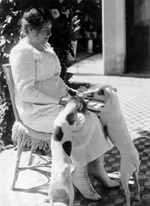
Lanteri in 1920

Lanteri worked for a decade in the Public Assistance Bureau of Buenos Aires and in the Emergency Hospital and Dispensary. She campaigned actively for greater access to medical care for the poor early on, and founded a periodical, Semana Médica, for the purpose. She established the Argentine Association of Free Thought in 1905, and remained active in women's rights causes, having joined Grierson, Alicia Moreau de Justo, and others in the establishment of the Center for Feminism at the 1906 International Congress of Free Thought, held in Buenos Aires.

She founded the National League of Women Freethinkers and its journal, La Nueva Mujer. She helped organize the first International Congress of Women in 1910, and later helped organize the first National Child Welfare Congress. Her application for a faculty position at her alma mater's Medical School was denied on grounds that she was a still a resident alien, prompting her to apply for Argentine citizenship. Single immigrant women, however, were not generally granted citizenship in Argentina. Lanteri married Dr. Alberto Renshaw in 1910, and following an eight-month-long lawsuit, she was granted citizenship in 1911. The marriage was in itself controversial, as he was 14 years younger than the bride. The same pretext was used to deny her enrollment in the Psychiatry course at her own alma mater's School of Medicine.

Armed with detailed knowledge of Law 5.098, which specified numerous requisites for the right to vote while remaining moot on a woman's right to do so, Lanteri persuaded the precinct chair to accept her vote in the 16 July 1911, elections for the Deliberative Council, thus becoming the first woman to vote in South America; women were not granted the right to vote in Argentina nationwide until 1947. Electoral Law was amended that year to require military service (something required of all male Argentine citizens) in order to vote, again eliminating women. Lanteri instead joined her lawyer, Angelica Barreda, in forming a political party, the National Feminist Union, in 1918, and she ran for a seat in the Argentine Chamber of Deputies in every election thereafter until the 1930 military coup.

Her political party's platform called for universal suffrage, equality of the sexes under the Argentine Civil Code, and a wide array of progressive social legislation, including: legislation regulating working hours; equal pay; pensions; maternity leave benefits; labor law reforms regarding women and child laborers; professional training for women; the legalization of divorce; specialist care for juvenile delinquents; prison reform; the abolition of capital punishment; investments in public health and kindergartens; greater work safety regulation in factories; bans on the manufacture and sale of alcohol, preventive medicine against infectious diseases, and bans on regulated brothels. She was unsuccessful, however, garnering 1,000 to 1,730 votes in each election; among her supporters was the nationalist writer Manuel Gálvez who, opposed to both the Conservatives and the ruling UCR, opted to vote for the "intrepid Dr. Lanteri."

Dr. Lanteri was inducted into the Argentine Medical Association. She continued to practice medicine, and provided psychiatric and mental health nursing to needy women and children. She founded the first primary school in the town of Sáenz Peña, Buenos Aires, and lectured extensively in Europe. She ventured into other activities, introducing a hair restoration tonic in 1928. Her work for women's suffrage took a novel turn when, in 1929, she applied for military service on the rationale that, since military service was required for all citizens, women should be permitted military service and, accordingly, the vote. The case reached the Argentine Supreme Court, where it was stricken down, however.

== Death and legacy ==
Lanteri walked along Diagonal Norte Avenue, in downtown Buenos Aires, on 23 February 1932, when a motorist struck her. The driver fled, and following two days in the hospital, the noted physician and activist died at age 58; over 1,000 people attended her funeral.

The incident, ruled an accident by the police, was called into question at the time by El Mundo writer Adelia Di Carlo. The news daily published details of the incident, including the fact that the police report had had the driver's name and vehicle tags blotted out; that the man, David Klapenbach, was a member of the right-wing paramilitary group, the Argentine Patriotic League; and that Klapenbach himself had committed numerous murders. Di Carlo's home was ransacked by the Argentine Federal Police following the publication of these details.

Investigative journalists Araceli Bellota and Ana María De Mena published biographies of Lanteri (Julieta Lanteri: La pasión de una mujer and Palomita Blanca, respectively), in 2001. A street in the newest district of Buenos Aires, Puerto Madero, was named in her honor. In 2019, a new station in Line H of the Buenos Aires Underground was named after Lanteri.

== See also ==
- Feminism in Argentina
- Timeline of women's suffrage
