= Asociación Pro Derechos de la Mujer =

Women's association in Argentina

Asociación Pro Derechos de la Mujer was a women's organization in Argentina, founded in 1919.

It was founded by Elvira Rawson, Adelina Di Carlo, Emma Day and Alfonsina Storni in 1919. It played an important role for the struggle for women's suffrage in Argentina. They also engaged in other issues, and played an important role within reforms in women's working rights.
