= Argentine Society of Plastic, Reconstructive and Aesthetic Surgery =

Argentine nonprofit association

The Argentine Society of Plastic, Reconstructive and Aesthetic Surgery (SACPER) is a medical nonprofit association, which includes doctors specialized in plastic surgery in Argentina.

== Origins and history ==
In the world, plastic surgery was developed during the First World War, in England, France, Germany, and the United States, where the first specialized training centers and the first texts on the subject appeared. Those centers were attended by surgeons from around the world that wanted to learn the new specialty. A small group of selected plastic surgeons in Argentina, Brazil, Chile, Peru and Uruguay, among other countries, met in São Paulo, in 1940, and organized the Latin American Society of Plastic Surgery.

The first Latin American Congress of Plastic Surgery in Rio de Janeiro and São Paulo followed in 1941. Attendees included Argentine surgeons Dr. Ernesto Malbec (Buenos Aires) and Dr. Lelio Zeno (Rosario). The 2nd Latin American Congress was held in 1942, in Buenos Aires and in Rosario, and created a significant boost to the specialty in Argentina.

Argentina was the home of a small number of specialists up to the 1940s, and the publication of their findings were largely limited to general medical journals or the bulletin of the Argentine Society of Surgeons. "Clinical rounds" by plastic surgeons, in the few hospitals that included one, began in Argentina in 1949. Complex cases were discussed with great interest, allowing professionals to compare and add opinions of medical diagnosis and treatment; that was the beginning of the teaching of the specialty in Argentina.

The clinical rounds showed great practical utility, and gained importance with the years. An initiative by Dr. Héctor Marino for the establishment of a professional association of Argentine plastic surgeons led to two meetings on the subject: in late 1951 and early 1952. The Argentine Society of Plastic Surgery was established on March 24, 1952. An interim steering committee of 14 members was formed, and Doctors José C. Viñas and Alberto Beaux drafted the charter.

The first scientific meeting was held at the headquarters of the Argentine Medical Association, on July 17, 1952. The first General Assembly was held on April 23, 1953, to elect the first board of directors and appoint its first president, Dr. Ernesto Malbec.

By the mid-'50s, Argentine plastic surgery had developed considerably, as more hospitals included professional plastic surgeons in their staff. SACPER's Argentine Congress of Plastic Surgery met in cities across the country, and the group began to develop conferences, courses and other educational activities.

The first SACPER presidents were:

- 1953: Dr. Ernesto Malbec
- 1954: Dr. Héctor Marino
- 1955: Dr. Julián Fernández
- 1956: Dr. Alberto Beaux
- 1957: Dr. Roberto Dellepiane Rawson
- 1958: Dr. Miguel Correa Iturraspe
- 1959: Dr. Guillermo Armanino
- 1960: Dr. Jorge Santamarina Iraola
- 1961: Dr. Fortunato Benaim
- 1962: Dr. Jorge Niklison
- 1963: Dr. Cornelio O'Connor
- 1964: Dr. Luis Monti
- 1965: Dr. José Spera.

All of them with a recognized ability as well as a reputation as pioneers and promoters of the specialty in Argentina.

In 1965, the Argentine Society of Plastic Surgery invited Spanish and Portuguese Plastic Surgery Societies to the First Ibero-American Congress, leading to the establishment of the Ibero Latin American Federation of Plastic Surgery, a decade later.

Since SACPER's founding in 1953 and until 1995, its president was in charge of the Argentine Congress of Plastic Surgery. Since 1996, it was decided that the chairmanship of the latter should fall on another member of the Society, considering the complexity of these events by taking the advances and new developments in the specialty and mass audience of professionals.

The specialty has been recognized by the National Academy of Medicine, dedicating a seat which was occupied successively by two former presidents of SACPER: first by Dr. Héctor Marino and then by Dr. Fortunato Benaim.

== Objectives ==
The following objectives stand out in SACPER's statute :

1. Contribute to the continuous improvement of plastic surgeons organizing scientific events (seminars and conferences) and refresher courses, as well as accreditation and evaluation of continuing medical education programs.

2. Establish the basic patterns of teaching and training of future specialists, as well as the certification and recertification of current specialists.

3. Ensure compliance with ethical and legal standards in the specialty medical practices, and excellence in the system.

4. Provide accurate information to the community, objective and scientific rigor on the specialty.

== Organizational structure ==
The SACPER governing body is constituted by the General Assembly and the governing board, headed by a president. The assembly is held with the present members at the annual meeting, and the following posts are elected by simple majority: a) SACPER Commission Directive, b) President of the Argentine Congress of Plastic Surgery, c) Editor of the Argentine Journal of Plastic Surgery, and d) Director of Higher Course of Specialization in Plastic Surgery. These four figures represent in each of their areas the highest expression of scientific development of the specialty.

The SACPER Commission Directive conducts its business through Committees (technical-administrative area) and Chapters (scientific-care area). They are:

Committees: a) Continuing medical education; b) Medical ethics, c) Legal issues; d) Medical recertification; e) Teaching and research, among others.

Chapters: a) Aesthetic surgery; b) Treatment of burn and surgery; c) Maxillofacial surgery; d) Pediatric plastic surgery; e) Hands and extremities plastic surgery, among others.

The current president of the SACPER is Dr. Dr. Omar Pellicioni.

== Regions ==
SACPER is organized into nine regions which cover the whole country. They are: 1. Buenos Aires 2. La Plata 3. Mar del Plata 4. Rosario & the Littoral 5. Córdoba & Central Argentina 6. Northeast (NEA) 7. Northwest (NOA) 8. Cuyo 9. Patagonia

Professionals first associate through a regional area; specialists who meet the requirements to become members can be incorporated to these. Members of the national society must first be members of their respective regional chapters.

== Argentine Congress of Plastic Surgery ==
It is the most important scientific activity at SACPER and it is held annually. Its location varies among the different cities of the country, and the General Assembly decides on the venue by a vote.

These Congresses are increasingly important and popular because of the unceasing progress and development of new procedures, instruments and technical resources on both aesthetic and reconstructive surgery.

The 42nd Congress took place in Buenos Aires, on April 17–20, 2012, and was chaired by Dr. Vicente Hugo Bertone.

== Higher Course of Specialization in Plastic Surgery ==
The SACPER postgraduate course is of three years' duration, and trains specialists.

Seventy-two local and foreign specialists have graduated since the course's inception in 1977; its current director is Dr. Ricardo J. Losardo.

== Argentine Journal of Plastic Surgery ==
The official publication of SACPER, the journal currently publishes four quarterly numbers per year; its current editor is Dr. Martha O. Mogliani.

== Community service ==
It is the most important daily work at SACPER, and is expressed through a solidary campaign against congenital malformation, which operates throughout the country as a SACPER contribution to the community.

It is dedicated to the medical and surgical treatment of patients with cleft lip and palate with the participation of voluntary and pro bono plastic surgeons, and is directed by Dr. Rodolfo Rojas.

== Inter-institutional relations ==
The SACPER is a section of Argentine Medical Association (AMA) and is related internationally with Ibero-Latin American Federation of Plastic and Reconstructive Surgery (FILACP), and International Confederation for Plastic, Reconstructive and Aesthetic Surgery (IPRAS).

Surgeons in this specialty believe that the terms "aesthetic" and "reconstructive" are, in reality, inseparable in the daily practice of plastic surgery, for what is ultimately intended for each patient, according to their needs and condition, is a better quality of life.

== See also ==
- Plastic Surgery
- Reconstructive Surgery
- Cosmetic Surgery
- Health in Argentina
