= Lucila Luciani de Pérez Díaz =

Venezuelan historian, musician and feminist (1882-1971)

- National Woman's Party, 1928
- Born: Lucila Luciani Eduardo; 21 January 1882; Maracaibo, Zulia, Venezuela
- Died: 8 March 1971 (aged 89); Caracas, Venezuela
- Occupations: Teacher, historian, musician, feminist
- Known for: First woman to be inducted into the National Academy of History

Lucila Luciani de Pérez Díaz (21 January 1882 – 8 March 1971) was a Venezuelan historian, musician and feminist. She was the first woman Director of the Teacher's Normal School, served as the librarian of the Ministry of Foreign Affairs and became the Deputy Director of the National Library. She was the first woman inducted into the National Academy of History and was Venezuela's delegate for the inaugural body of the Inter-American Commission of Women. She was one of the founders of the feminist movement in Venezuela and published the feminist magazine Iris.

== Biography ==
Lucila Luciani Eduardo was born on 21 January 1882 in Maracaibo, Zulia, Venezuela to Juan Nepomuceno Luciani and Casimira Eduardo. She was educated in Venezuela, the United States and France, and studied piano and violin with renowned instructors like Ramón Delgado Palacios. She performed abroad at both private and public concerts, returning in 1909 to Venezuela and marrying the pioneering dermatologist, Manuel Pérez Díaz (1872–1931), with whom she had eight children.

Luciani began her career writing historical and feminist articles, literary critiques and essays for journals and newspapers She published several short stories, and in 1919, she published her first book, La batalla de Boyacá: su importancia militar y política, which won the award of the Academy of History of Venezuela in the early 1920s.

In 1928, when the Inter-American Commission of Women (CIM) was founded, Luciani was designated as one of the inaugural members. Doris Stevens, who had suggested the commission to investigate the disparity of laws effecting women throughout the Americas, was appointed as chair and the other six countries were selected by lot. The chosen countries were Argentina, Colombia, El Salvador, Haiti, Panama, and Venezuela and the appointed delegates were Dr. Ernestina A. López de Nelson from Argentina, María Elena de Hinestrosa from Colombia, María Alvárez de Guillén Rivas from El Salvador, Alice Téligny Mathon from Haiti, Clara González from Panama and Luciani from Venezuela. That same year, she began publishing Iris: revista de acción social and remained as its director until 1941. The magazine was published in conjunction with the Unión de Damas de la Acción Católica, (Union of Catholic Women of Action) of which Luciani was founder and first president, but was a feminist journal.

When her husband died in 1931, Luciani became sole support of her large family and began teaching. Between 1934 and 1935 she taught at the Escuela Normal para Mujeres (Female Teacher's Normal School) and in 1936 became its first female Director. That same year, she also served as the Director of the Colegio Cháves and worked as a librarian at the Ministry of Foreign Affairs. In 1939 she became the Deputy Director of the Biblioteca Nacional (National Library) and in 1940, she was awarded the first chair (number 10) ever given to a woman at the National Academy of History.

She represented Venezuela in several international conferences. Besides her travel and research work with the CIM, Luciani attended the International Congress of the Union of Catholic Women held in Santiago, Chile in 1936. In 1941, she was appointed as the first female President of Venezuela's Catholic Conference and in 1945, she served in Venezuela's delegation to the conference in San Francisco which resulted in the founding of the United Nations.

Luciani died on 8 March 1971 in Caracas, Venezuela.

== Selected works ==
- L. de Pérez Díaz, Lucila (1919). La batalla de Boyacá: su importancia militar y política (in Spanish). Caracas: Tip. Cultura venezolana. OCLC 15023788.
- Luciani de Peréz Díaz, Lucila (January 1929). "Miranda: precursor do feminismo". Revista Feminina (in Portuguese). Anno XVI (176). São Paulo, Brazil: Empresa Feminina Brasileira do São Paulo: 30–32.
- L. de Pérez Díaz, Lucila (1933). Bolivianas; ensayos históricos: homenaje al Libertador en el sesquicentenario de su natalicio (in Spanish). Caracas: Editorial "Elite". OCLC 253124751.
- Luciani de Pérez Díaz, Lucila (1939). Lecciones de Catecismo, o el Catecismo [i.e. "Catecismo de la Doctrina Cristiana" ] enseñado a los niños por una madre (in Spanish). Caracas: Editorial Venezuela. OCLC 561018892.
- Luciani de Pérez Díaz, Lucila (1940). Discursos pronunciados en la recepcion de la Senora Lucila Luciani de Perez Diaz como individuo de numero de la Corporacion (in Spanish). Cáracas: Tipografia Americana. OCLC 83566716.
- L. de Pérez Díaz, Lucila (1968). Miranda: su vida y su obra (in Spanish). Caracas: Comandancia General de la Marina. OCLC 2100272.
- L. de Pérez Díaz, Lucila (1970). Páginas sueltas (in Spanish). Caracas: Academia Nacional de la Historia. OCLC 253636688.
- L. de Pérez Díaz, Lucila (1970). Catálogo de libros de la exposición catequística: con un estudio histórico y bibliográfico. Volume 24 of CIDOC Sondeos (in Spanish). Cuernavaca, México: Centro Intercultural de Documentación de Biblioteca Nacional de Venezuela. OCLC 253781145.
- Luciani de Pérez Díaz, Lucila (1975). Seis ensayos sobre Bolívar. Biblioteca selecta de la cultura venezolana, Vol. 3 (in Spanish). Caracas: Editorial Laude. OCLC 254013111.
- Luciani de Pérez Díaz, Lucila (2006). Historia mínima (in Spanish). Caracas: BanCaribe. ISBN 978-980-12-2051-0.

== Sources ==
- Hilton, Ronald, ed. (1951). Who's Who in Latin America: Part III, Columbia, Ecuador and Venezuela. Stanford, California: Stanford University Press. ISBN 978-0-8047-0726-8.
- Lee, Muna; Cohen, Jonathan (2004). A Pan-American Life: Selected Poetry and Prose of Muna Lee. Madison, Wisconsin: University of Wisconsin Press. ISBN 978-0-299-20234-7.
- Pacheco, Carlos; Barrera Linares, Luis; González Stephan, Beatriz (2006). Nación y literatura: itinerarios de la palabra escrita en la cultura venezolana. Caracas: Equinoccio. ISBN 978-980-6428-73-7.
