= María Álvarez de Guillén =

- Álvarez de Guillén in 1929
- Born: María Álvarez Ángel; 1889; El Salvador
- Died: 1980 (aged 90–91); El Salvador
- Other names: María Álvarez de Guillén Rivas, Amary Zalvera
- Occupations: Coffee plantation operator, writer
- Known for: Women's rights activism
- Children: Marta Guillén Álvarez Álvaro Guillén Álvarez
- Father: Rafael Álvarez Lalinde

María Álvarez de Guillén (1889–1980), pen name Amari Zalvera, (Note: According to her great-granddaughter, Álvarez's pseudonym was an anagram of her real name, Amari Zalvera. Some references spell the first name as Amari, and others use the spelling Amary.) was a Salvadoran businesswoman, writer and women's rights activist. She was one of the first Salvadoran women to publish a novel and was one of the first delegates to serve on the Inter-American Commission of Women.

== Early life ==
Her parents moved to El Salvador to join her uncle Emilio and his family in establishing a coffee business. They arrived on 5 June 1889 and initially the family lived in San Salvador with Emilio and his family, but soon moved ten miles away to Quezaltepeque to the Colombia coffee farm. Rafael, who had been a shopkeeper in Colombia, served as manager of Emilio's farms Colombia and Santa Isabel and soon opened the first water-powered depulping machinery in El Salvador.

María Álvarez Ángel was born 24 August 1889 (Note: Reports of her birth date and place vary. Her great-granddaughter states she was the first member of her family to be born in El Salvador, and that the family arrived in 1898. Fernández Asenjo indicates she was born in 1896, as does Sermeño Melara. In 1929, L'Égyptienne published her birth year as 1889, citing that the information came from the Inter-American Commission of Women. That date is confirmed by immigration records for a border crossing in 1944 to the United States from Mexico. Baptismal records in Colombia, indicate a María Álvarez Ángel was born 20 February 1887 in Manizales, Colombia to Rafael Álvarez and Julia Ángel.) in El Salvador to Julia Ángel Macias and Rafael Álvarez Lalinde. When Álvarez was eight years old, the family moved to Santa Ana, where she attended the Colegio de la Asuncion. Her father continued managing his brother's farms and began purchasing his own properties for coffee production as well. After graduating, she married Dr. Joaquin Guillén Rivas in 1914.

== Career ==
Over the next several years, Álvarez, who would continue to work on her family coffee plantation, had five children. Besides raising her children, she was active in charitable and social programs, as well as the movement for suffrage. She was one of the suffragists who won the right for the enfranchisement of women, which was enshrined in the constitution developed by the Federal Republic of Central America. But when the Republic fell apart in 1922, she founded the Sociedad Confraternidad de Señoras de la República de El Salvador (Confraternal Society of Women of the Republic of El Salvador) and led campaigns for voting and nationality rights of women in El Salvador. Publishing articles on social welfare and political issues, Álvarez published her first literary work in 1926. Her book, La Hija de Casa (Daughter of the House) won second prize in the national literary competition Queremos and was the first novel published by a woman in El Salvador.

In 1928, the Pan American Union created the Inter-American Commission of Women (Spanish: Comisión Interamericana de Mujeres, CIM) to review data and prepare information comparing women's civil and political equality in the region. The inaugural delegates to the CIM, selected by lot, included Álvarez, along with chair Doris Stevens (United States), Ernestina A. López de Nelson (Argentina), María Elena de Hinestrosa (Colombia), Alice Téligny Mathon (Haiti), Clara González (Panama), and Lucila Luciani de Pérez Díaz (Venezuela). Not only did Álvarez work to compile the information, over the course of her ten-year service to the CIM, she frequently urged the government of El Salvador to amend the constitution to protect women's citizenship, so that upon marriage they did not lose their nationality and had equal civil rights to men.

Throughout her career, Álvarez continued writing, creating several theatrical works, as well as another unpublished manuscript which had been completed by 1929. Her second published novel, Sobre el puente (Over the Bridge, 1947) wove a love story throughout a historical account of Panama's relationship with Colombia and the United States. She continued to work in coffee production and in her later years published a book of poetry El pregón del café (The Proclamation of Coffee). She retired from the farm in 1965, leaving production to her daughter and as she aged, Álvarez lost her sight.

== Death and legacy ==
Álvarez died in 1980 and was buried in the Cementerio de Los Ilustres in the family mausoleum. Her letters to Doris Stevens, during her service on the CIM, are housed in the Schlesinger Library at Harvard University in Cambridge, Massachusetts. Her daughter, María "Marta" (born 1915) became a noted opera singer.

== Selected works ==
- Zalvera, Amary (1926). La Hija de Casa. San Salvador, El Salvador.
- Zalvera, Amary (1947). Sobre el puente. San Salvador, El Salvador. OCLC 20950513.
- Zalvera, Amary (1965). Hola América (in Spanish). San Salvador, El Salvador: Institute of Hispanic Culture. OCLC 1124922540.
- Zalvera, Amary (1975). El pregón del café: poemas (in Spanish). Madrid, Spain: Afrodisio Aguado. ISBN 978-84-202-0318-8.
