= Carolina Muzzilli =

Argentine activist (1889–1917)

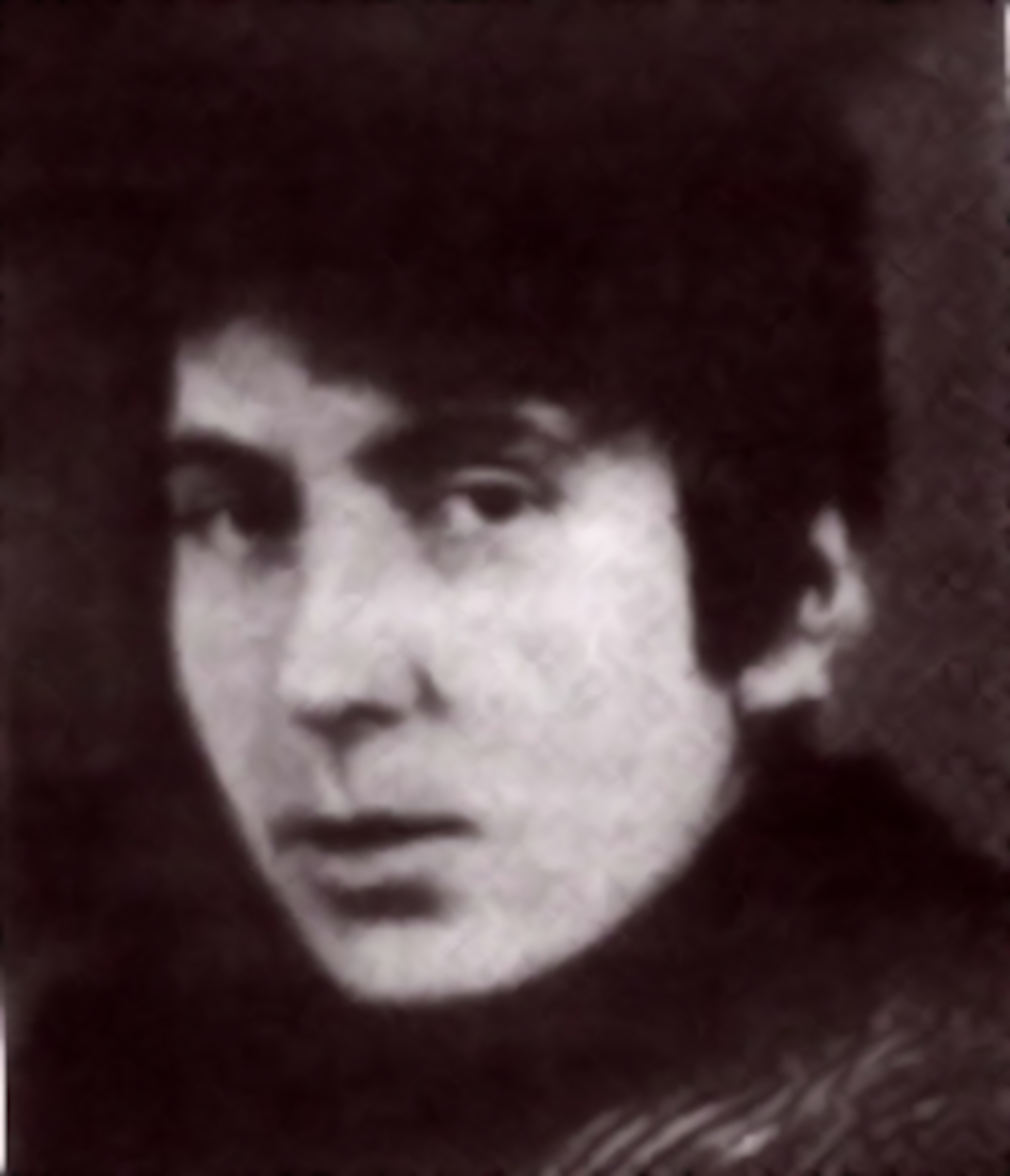
- Born: Carolina Muzzilli; 17 November 1889; Buenos Aires, Argentina
- Died: March 23, 1917 (aged 27)

Carolina Muzzilli (also Muzilli, 17 November 1889 – 23 March 1917) was an Argentine industrial researcher and social activist of Italian descent. She was the first woman to be made an official of Argentina's National Department of Employment. She did much to improve the working conditions in factories and the work place in Argentina.

== Career ==
Muzzilli was a seamstress, working in a factory. As a self-taught person, she reported on the working conditions of female laborers in La Prensa. She was critical of the upper elite who talked more and did less regarding the "exploitation of women and child workers." Her dogma was for "sportive" feminism rather than the elitist subdued practice of conservative approach to feminism. She was a notable militant feminist. Muzzilli served as director of the Women's Tribune , a feminist journal. In her work for the Women's Tribune, she took active part in the education programmes for the workers of cigar and textile industries in particular, as the health conditions prevailing in these industries were deplorable; she projected this as a class conflict.

Muzzilli was instrumental in the enactment of legislation to protect workers by active participation in 1906, in the activities of the Beneficent Society. In 1907, when divorce was legalized in Uruguay, Muzzilli demanded divorce laws be enacted in Argentina, too, for which Elvira Rawson de Dellepiane took a dissenting view. In 1912, she took up the cause of women (in the age group of 12 to 50) who were working in the laundry of “La Higiénica” in poor conditions, where workers often fainted in the ironing section of the laundry due to excessive heat during summer. The inspectors, instead of helping them, would count the duration the workers fainted and insist that the workers make good the “lost time during her workday.” Muzzilli's lament was that the majority of management who opposed the claims of the workers were “militant Catholics, accustomed to wearing the papal cloak in processions."

In 1913, Muzzilli wrote the award-winning "El trabajo femenino", regarding the conditions faced by working women. In the same year, she participated in the Congress for the Protection of Childhood, and three years later, she campaigned for the Socialist Party. She wrote a number of articles in the Vanguard in 1917. She died of tuberculosis at the age of 27, in 1917.
