= Hospital Rivadavia =

Hospital in Palermo, Buenos Aires, Argentina

Coordinates: 34.585°S 58.402°W

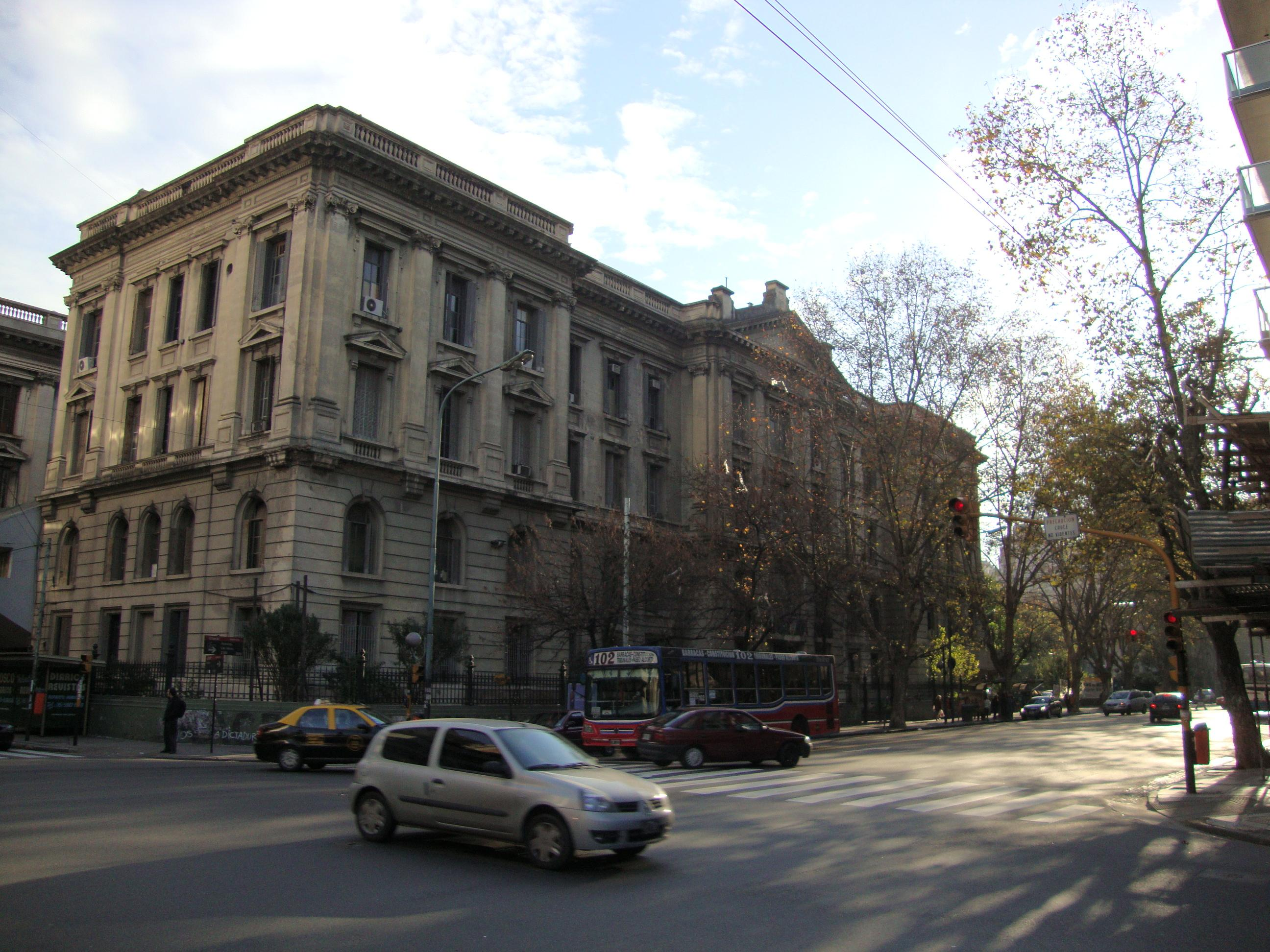
Main building (of 1887) of the Hospital Rivadavia.

The Hospital General de Agudos Bernardino Rivadavia was founded in 1774 in 800 Bartolomé Mitre St., San Nicolás, Buenos Aires, Argentina, with the name Hospital de mujeres (Women's Hospital).

In 1887 it was moved to its present location in 2670 Las Heras Ave., in the Palermo neighbourhood.
