= Hospital Ramos Mejía =

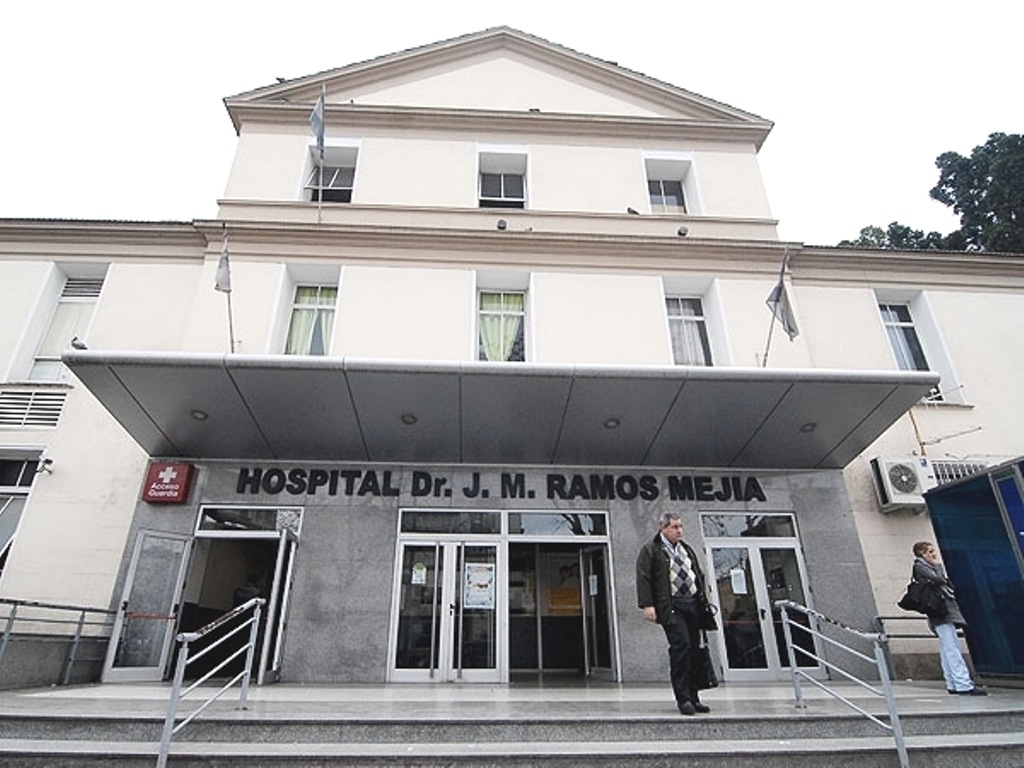

Geography
- Location: Urquiza 609 Balvanera, Buenos Aires, Argentina
- Coordinates: 34°37′06″S 58°24′37″W

Organisation
- Type: General

History
- Opened: 1883

Links
- Website: www.hospitalramosmejia.com.ar
- Lists: Hospitals in Argentina

Hospital Ramos Mejía is a hospital in Buenos Aires, Argentina.

== Notable patients who have been in the hospital ==
- José María Gatica, Argentine boxer, was hospitalized after a fight in 1947.
