= Elvira López (feminist) =

Argentine feminist, activist, reformer and author

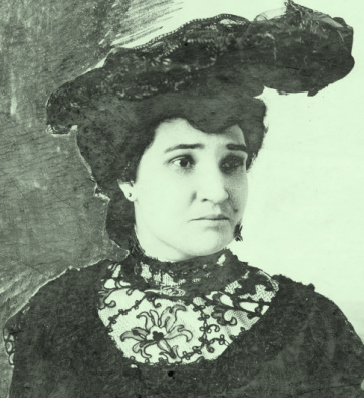

Elvira V. López (1871–1956) was an Argentine feminist, activist, reformer and author.

Along with her sister, Ernestina López de Nelson, she studied philosophy at the University of Buenos Aires. In 1901 she completed a doctoral thesis on feminism, El movimiento feminista, supervised by Rodolfo Rivarola and Antonio Dellepiane. In her thesis key concepts include female education, work, and family.

She focused on the need to reform teaching programs, as well as, the intolerance which opposes the education of women. Drawing extensively on European sources, the thesis reviewed the development of feminism in the United States, Canada, Africa, India and Argentina. A final chapter reviewed international feminist congresses. Elvira López, seu Poem e sua Maeta: sobre duas cantigas constitutes the metaphor(maeta) of what her body represents and the stigma around the discourse during that time.

== Works ==
- El movimiento feminista. Tesis presentada para optar por el grado de Doctora en Filosofía y Letras, Buenos Aires, Facultad de Filosofía y Letras, Imprenta Mariano Moreno, 1901. Republished as El movimiento feminista: Primeros trazos del feminismo en Argentina, Buenos Aires: Ediciones Biblioteca Nacional, 2009.
- 'La mujer en la Argentina: Costumbres, educación profesiones a que se dedica, datos estadísticos, legislación, etc.', Revista del Consejo Nacional de Mujeres, Vol. 2, No. 6 (June 1902)
- 'Mujeres en las fábricas', La Prensa, 31 May 1918
