= Argentine Medical Association =

Coordinates: 34°35′43″S 58°23′1.5″W

Asociación Médica Argentina
- Founded: 1891; 135 years ago
- Type: professional association
- Purpose: Health in Argentina
- Location: Santa Fe 1171, Buenos Aires
- Region served: Argentina
- Members: 37,000
- Key people: Dr. Elías Hurtado Hoyo, President
- Website: www.ama-med.ar

The Argentine Medical Association (Asociación Médica Argentina, AMA) is the principal professional association of physicians in Argentina. It is a medical non-profit organization with headquarters in Buenos Aires.

== Overview ==
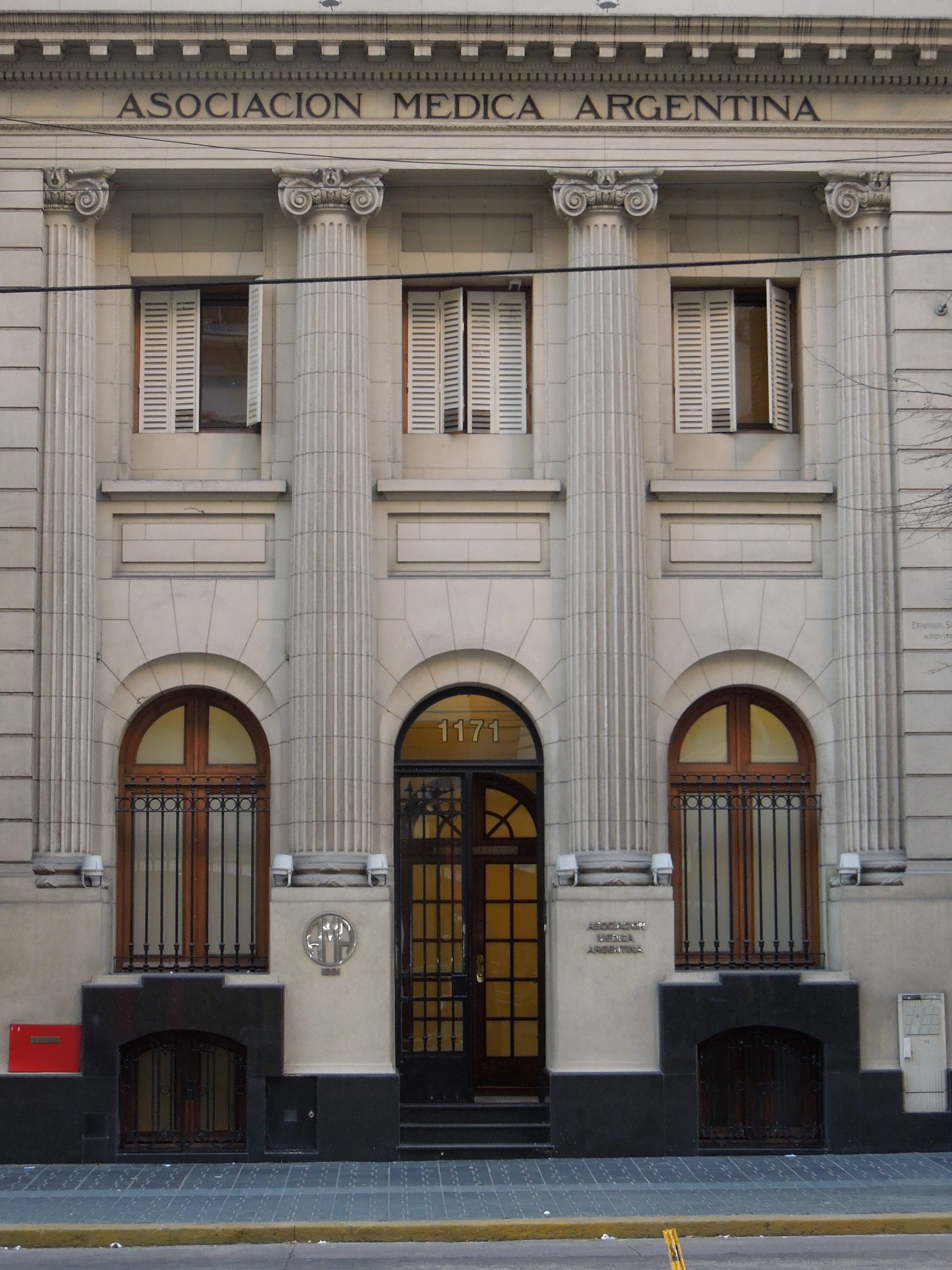
Santa Fe Avenue headquarters

The group was founded on September 5, 1891, as the Sociedad Mèdica Argentina by a conference of doctors in Buenos Aires led by Dr. Pedro F. Roberts, an ophthalmologist, and Doctors José Penna and Alfredo Lagarde. Though the society was preceded by the Buenos Aires National Academy of Medicine (founded in 1822), the former was founded with a focus on advocacy on behalf of the nation's medical professionals, and was a response to hardships imposed by the Panic of 1890. Although the founding conference debated the possibility of establishing the society as a guild or trade union, these options were discarded in favor of creating a professional association and learned society.

The society was initially composed of 106 members, and was housed within the Illuminated Block, a historic, Jesuit center of learning; among its founding members was Dr. Juan B. Justo, later a leader of the Socialist Party of Argentina. It relocated to offices of its own in 1892, and as it grew, it became legally necessary to have the society succeed to the Argentine Medical Association, a name adopted by an assembly held on August 13, 1913. The Buenos Aires city government granted it a valuable Santa Fe Avenue lot for the construction of new offices in 1917, and the following year, new headquarters were inaugurated.

The new facilities allowed the association to grow, and by 1923, over 1,000 physicians had become members. Six societies comprised the association in 1919: internal medicine, surgery, biology, microbiology, radiology, and ophthalmology. Societies of urology and otolaryngology were added in 1922, and later, toxicology (1926), and pharmacology (1928). Dr. Carlos Mainini's tenure (1936–42) was marked by a notable expansion of the group's academic activities, including the establishment of the societies of orthopedic surgery, endocrinology, nutrition science, and mental health, as well as the Argentine Society of Medical History. The Argentine Society of Plastic, Reconstructive and Aesthetic Surgery was inducted in 1952.

The institution grew to include 43 societies, 7 associations, and 25 committees; over 37,000 physicians (over a fourth of the nation's total) were members. The association issues accreditation to health facilities nationwide, and since 1950, operates the school of Continuing Medical Education, which offers 60 courses to over 2,000 students yearly (including around 300 from overseas). Its periodical, the Revista de la Sociedad Médica Argentina has been published since October 1891, and its library, opened in 1917, houses over 25,000 volumes.

== General features ==
This scientific society was created in 1891 to promote medical science and improve health.

It carried scientific sessions to disseminated information, advances and various aspects of medicine.

It is composed of sections and / or subsidiaries representing different medical specialties and subspecialties. Their number is increasing, in view of the complexity that medical science takes every day.

Is a center for teaching in different medical specialties. Basically, it performs continuing medical education and postgraduate education.

The AMA members require being doctors and having a behavior, honesty and morality of the profession itself.

== Objectives ==
They stand out in AMA statute the following:

1. Contribute to the progress of medicine and encourage scientific research.
2. Celebrating scientific activities by facilitating the exchange among its members in medical specialties.
3. Contribute to teaching medical in the country.
4. Publish the works of scientific interest to disseminate knowledge and encourage medical research.
5. To promote scientific relations with other similar foreign societies.

== Organizational structure ==
It consists of a general assembly, a steering committee and a board of AMA.

The administration of the AMA is in charge of a steering committee headed by a chairman. It is elected by the majority of the members present at the Ordinary General Assembly.

The council of the AMA is constituted by the committee and the chairmen of the sections and subsidiaries.

The president of the AMA is Prof. Dr. Elias Hurtado Hoyo.

== Sections ==
To organize scientific efforts in each specialty or discipline sections are created.

These sections are increasingly important and popular because of the unceasing progress and development of health sciences.

In them, they develop conferences, round tables and complex clinical cases also for discussed by the attendees and encouraging colleague's diagnosis and medical treatment. They also developed seminars, courses and other educational activities.

== Graduate School of AMA ==
The EGAMA began in 1977. Brings together and coordinates all formal educational activities carried out at AMA. Some of them are specialists in different disciplines. Its current director is Prof. Dr. Armando Arata.

== Journal of the Medical Association of Argentina ==
The Journal of the Medical Association of Argentina is the official publication of AMA. Professionals use it to dump its expertise in scientific articles in various fields.

The magazine is distributed to all partners. Four issues were published per year and is quarterly appearance. The current editor is Prof. Dr. Alfredo Buzzi.
