= Elvira Rawson de Dellepiane =

Dr. Elvira Rawson de Dellepiane
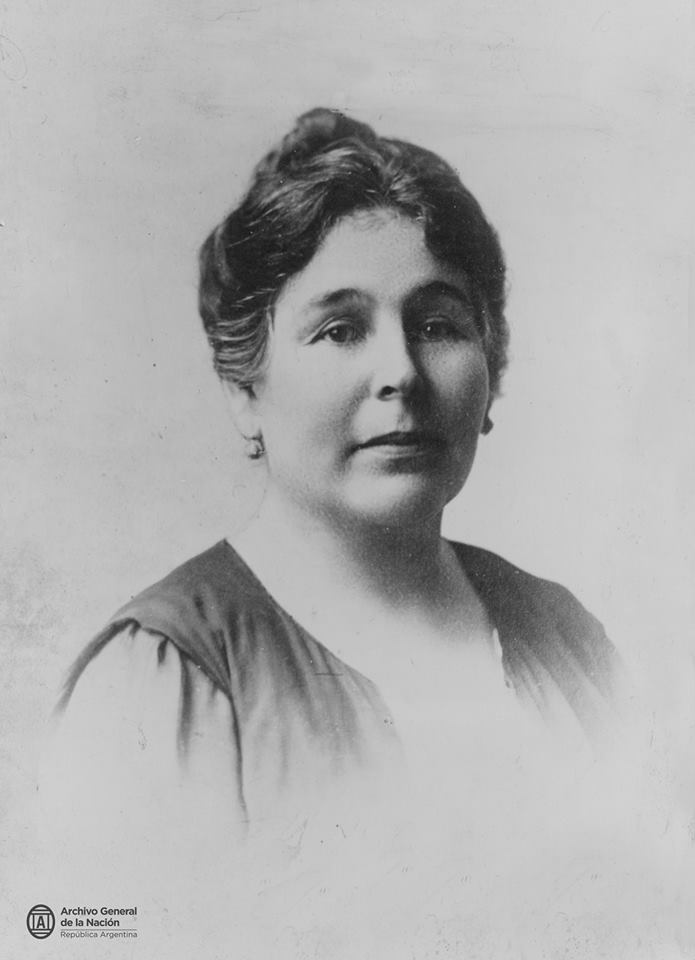
- Born: Elvira Rawson de Dellepiane; 19 April 1867; Junín, Argentina
- Died: 4 June 1954 (aged 87); Buenos Aires, Argentina
- Other names: Physician, Suffragist
- Education: University of Buenos Aires
- Spouse: Dr. Manuel Dellepiane
- Children: Seven

Dr. Elvira Rawson de Dellepiane (née Elvira Rawson; April 19, 1867 – June 4, 1954) was an Argentine militant suffragist and the second woman to receive a medical degree in Argentina. She was an activist for women's and children's rights and was known as "the mother of women's rights in Argentina".

== Early years ==
Rawson de Dellepiane was born in Junín, Argentina to Colonel Juan de Dios Rawson. She belonged to the renowned family of dean Gregorio Funes who was considered the father of history of Argentina. She was educated in Buenos Aires, receiving her university doctoral degree in medicine on 29 September 1892 from the University of Buenos Aires. Earlier to this, she had obtained a certificate from the Ecole Normale de Mendoza in teaching after that she had worked as a teacher for one year before starting her medical education. A year earlier, she married Doctor Manuel Dellepiane. Her doctoral thesis, which received the acclaim of Gregorio Aráoz Alfaro, a renowned physician of Argentina, was on "Notes on hygiene in women". She had seven children.

== Career ==
After her graduation she started practicing medicine. She devotedly promoted numerous projects, which included the establishment of the first school cafeteria in the country. In 1919, she was one of the founders of the Association Pro-Derechos de la Mujer. From 1920 to 1922, she served as professor of hygiene and child care at the National Home for Military Orphans (1920–22). In 1916, she was the organizer and director of the first vacation home for chronically ill women teachers, the Vacation Colony in Uspallata. During the period of 1907 to 1918, she was a medical inspector for the National Department of Hygiene (Departamento Nacional de Higiene). She served on the National Council of Education (Consejo Nacional de Educación) (1919–34).

In her commitment towards promoting rights of women in Argentina, she established the Centro Feminista in 1905, which was subsequently renamed to the Centro Juana Manuela Gorriti. In 1910, she pioneered the movement to establish civil code for women. In 1919, she established the Asociación Pro-Derechos de la Mujer; Alfonsina Storni, the Argentine writer and many others were her associates in this effort.

Among her career achievements are establishing the National Women's Council, participation in the First International Women's Congress in 1910, which was held in Buenos Aires, promoting subjects of Sociology, Law and Education, establishing the Maternal Center, known as "Juana Gorriti" (maternity home for unwed mothers) in 1910, founding the Association for Women-rights in 1919, making the practice of a "glass of milk" compulsory in schools, and writing many reports on the status and condition of women, and school households.
