= HIV/AIDS in North America =

As of 2016, it is estimated that there are 1.5 million adults and children living with HIV/AIDS in North America, excluding Central America and the Caribbean. 70,000 adults and children are newly infected every year, and the overall adult prevalence is 0.5%. 26,000 people in North America (again, excluding Central America and the Caribbean) die from AIDS every year.

HIV/AIDS prevalence rates in North America vary from 0.23% in Mexico to 3.22% in The Bahamas.

== HIV/AIDS in Antigua and Barbuda ==
Since the country's first HIV diagnosis in December 1985, reported cases of HIV have consistently increased through 2023. While the prevalence of HIV has persisted in both men and women ages 15 to 24, it remains relatively low at 0.2% as of 2024. The government and its implementation partners have facilitated free, confidential HIV testing, along with offering free antiretroviral medication.

== HIV/AIDS in The Bahamas ==
After a rapid increase from 1990 to 1995, the number of people of all ages living with HIV in the Bahamas has persisted at 4,100 to 4,500 total annually. In 2013, the adult prevalence rate was estimated to be 3.22%, which decreased to 1% of the general population in 2021. Of newly diagnosed HIV cases in 2021, the majority were males, persons aged 30 - 49, and persons living on the New Providence island.

== HIV/AIDS in Barbados ==
There has been a significant annual increase of people living with HIV/AIDS in Barbados, from less than 500 in 1990 to 2,400 in 2023. In 2013, the adult prevalence rate was estimated to be 0.88%, which increased to 1.5% in 2019 and was approximately 1% in 2022. Although the majority of people living with HIV know their status, only 52% are on treatment and only 46% are virally repressed. In 2018, after the Bahamas, Barbados became the second country in the English-speaking Caribbean to implement PrEP in its HIV prevention strategy nationally.

== HIV/AIDS in Belize ==
As of 2023, the adult prevalence rate of HIV/AIDS in Belize was estimated to be 1.10%, or about 3,600 - 3,800 people total, which is relatively high for the region. This reflects a significant and consistent annual increase of cases since 1990. In 2007 - 2011, the HIV prevalence rate was estimated to be as high as 2.1% among adults, which at the time was the highest in Central America and third-highest in the broader Caribbean after the Bahamas and Haiti.

== HIV/AIDS in Canada ==
As of 2012, the adult prevalence rate of HIV/AIDS in Canada was estimated at 0.30%. There has been a steady increase of people living with HIV in Canada, beginning at 31,000 in 1990 and now estimated at 64,000 in 2023. Stronger than this trend is the coverage of people receiving antiretroviral therapy, which has spiked from less than 1% in 1990 - 1995 to nearly 80% by 2021.

== HIV/AIDS in Costa Rica ==
As of 2014, the adult prevalence rate of HIV/AIDS in Costa Rica was estimated to be 0.26%. This reflects a consistent annual increase in people living with HIV, which has grown to exceed 20,000 in 2023. Since 2000, there has also been a continued increase in new HIV infections each year through 2023. An annual increase in coverage of people receiving antiretroviral therapy since 2000 has also matched these trends.

== HIV/AIDS in Cuba ==
As of 2014, the adult prevalence rate of HIV/AIDS in Cuba was estimated to be 0.25%. More recently, UNAIDS reports a steady annual increase of people living with HIV in Cuba, reported to be as high as 41,000 people in 2023, with a corresponding increase to 70% coverage of people receiving antiretroviral treatment. Cuba's policies of mandatory quarantining of HIV-positive individuals and mandatory HIV testing are unique to the region.

== HIV/AIDS in the Dominican Republic ==
As of 2012, the adult prevalence rate of HIV/AIDS in the Dominican Republic was estimated to be 0.68%, which increased to 1% in 2023 to be considered a concentrated epidemic.

== HIV/AIDS in El Salvador ==
As of 2012, the adult prevalence rate of HIV/AIDS in El Salvador was estimated to be 0.60%.

== HIV/AIDS in Guatemala ==
As of 2023, the adult prevalence rate of HIV/AIDS in Guatemala was estimated to be 0.20%.

== HIV/AIDS in Haiti ==
As of 2014, the adult prevalence rate of HIV/AIDS in Haiti was estimated to be 1.93%.

== HIV/AIDS in Honduras ==
As of 2012, the adult prevalence rate HIV/AIDS in Honduras was estimated to be 0.50%.

== HIV/AIDS in Jamaica ==
As of 2012, the adult prevalence rate of HIV/AIDS in Jamaica was estimated to be 1.70%.

== HIV/AIDS in Mexico ==
As of 2014, the adult prevalence rate of HIV/AIDS in Mexico was estimated to be 0.23%.

== HIV/AIDS in Nicaragua ==
As of 2012, the adult prevalence rate of HIV/AIDS in Nicaragua was estimated to be 0.30%.

== HIV/AIDS in Panama ==
As of 2012, the adult prevalence rate of HIV/AIDS in Panama was estimated to be 0.70%.

== HIV/AIDS in Trinidad and Tobago ==
As of 2012, the adult prevalence rate of HIV/AIDS in Trinidad and Tobago was estimated to be 1.60%.

== HIV/AIDS in the United States ==
In 2012, the adult prevalence rate was estimated to be 0.60%. African-Americans are at the highest risk of contracting HIV in the United States. According to the Centers for Disease and Control and Prevention (CDC), African-American accounted for 44% of all new HIV infections in the United States between 2010 and 2016, although African-Americans make up roughly 12% of the American population. The extent of the HIV/AIDS crisis within the African-American community is an indication that the solution will also need to be multi-faceted ranging from increasing access to health care to reducing the stigma that HIV and homosexuality has within the African-American community.

== See also ==
- HIV/AIDS in Africa
- HIV/AIDS in Asia
- HIV/AIDS in Europe
- HIV/AIDS in South America
- List of countries by HIV/AIDS adult prevalence rate
