= Health in Haiti =

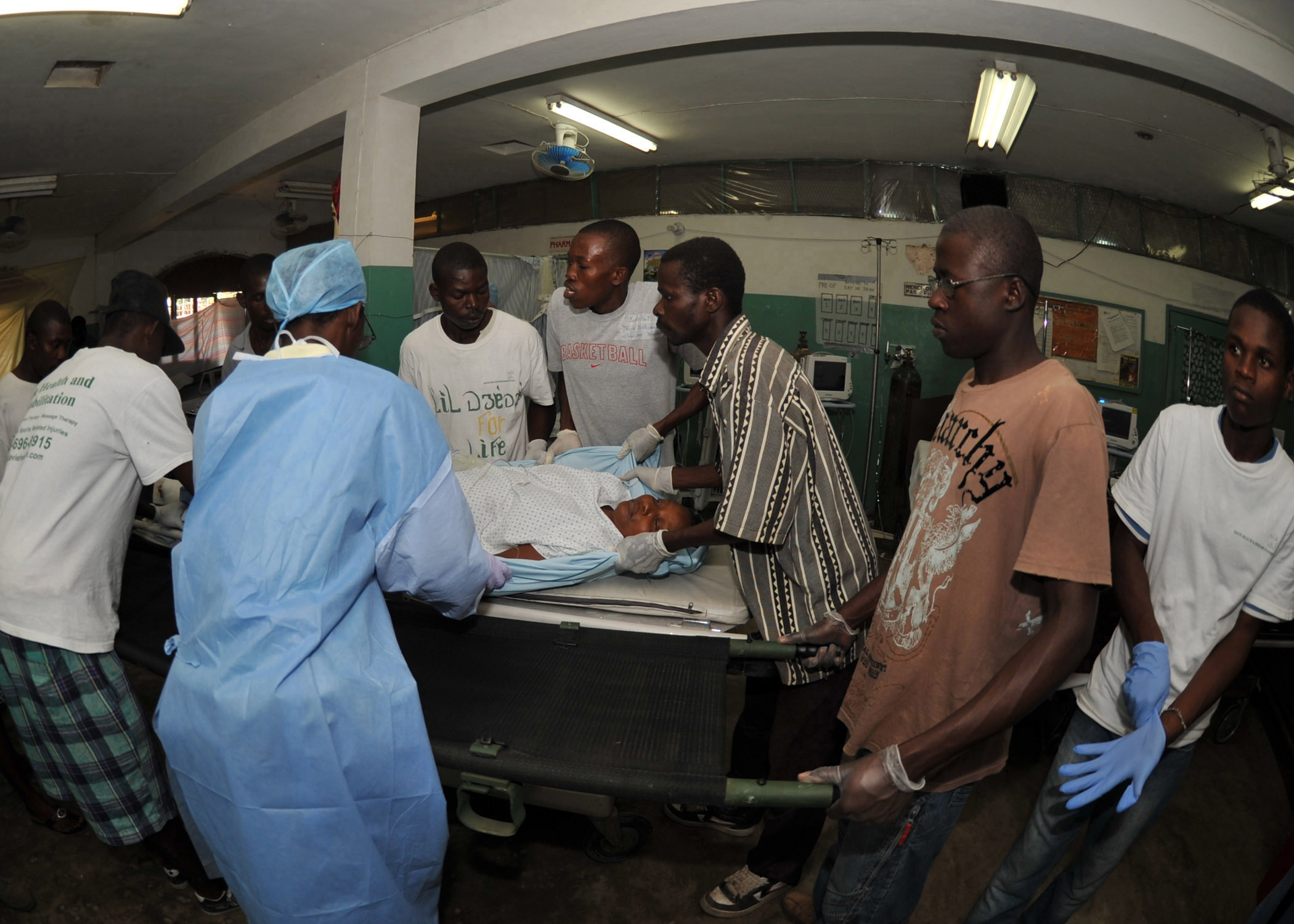
Medical personnel prepare a Haitian woman for surgery at the Milot hospital in cap-Haitian, Haiti operated by the Crudem Foundation.

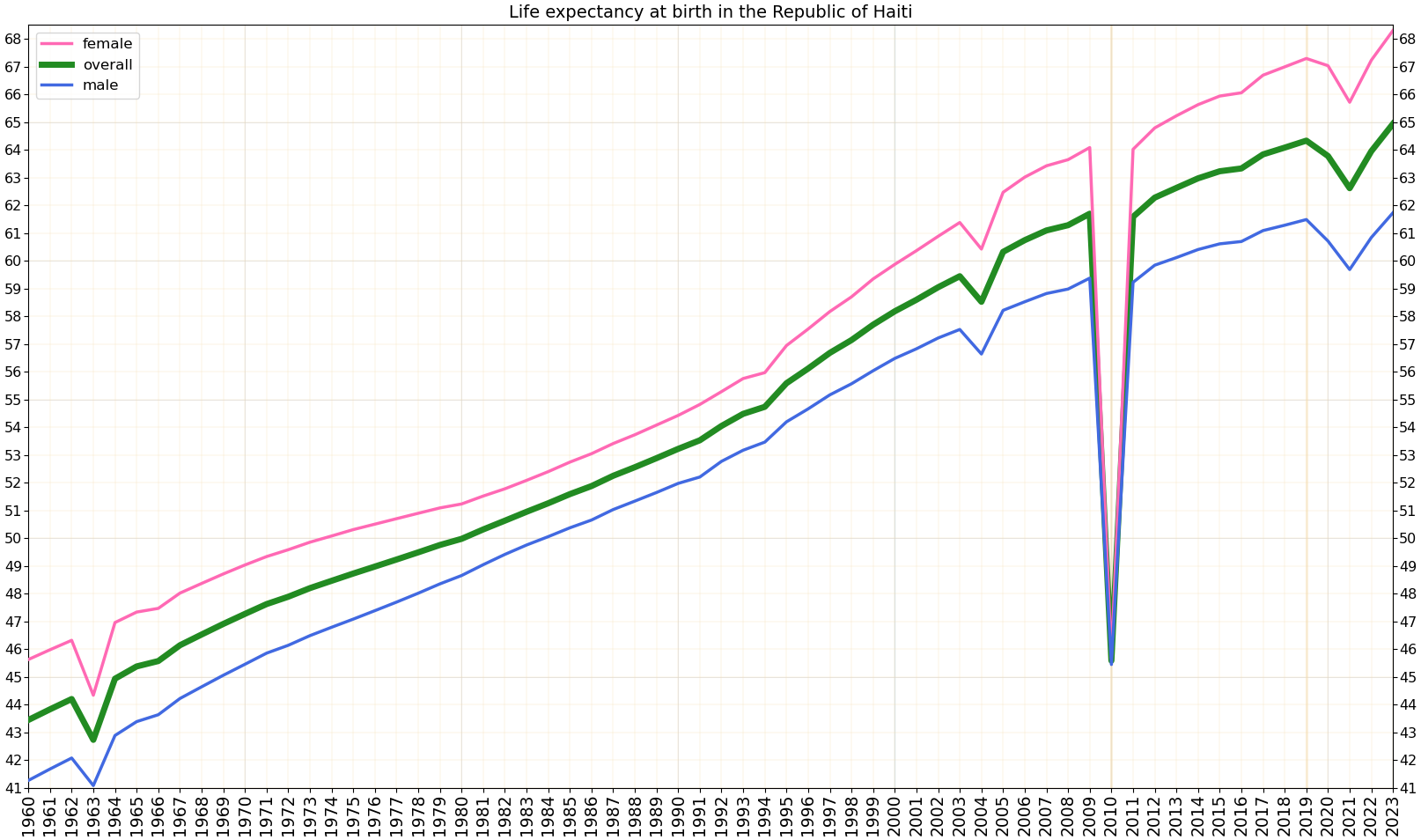
Life expectancy in Haiti

Deficient sanitation systems, poor nutrition, and inadequate health services have pushed Haiti to the bottom of the World Bank's rankings of health indicators. The World Bank reports that Haiti's infant and maternal mortality rates remain among the highest in the region, with declining preventive care coverage, particularly affecting the poorest households. Also, according to the United Nations World Food Programme, 80 percent of Haiti's population lives below the poverty line. In fact, 75% of the Haitian population lives off of $2.50 per day. Consequently, malnutrition is a significant problem. Half the population can be categorized as "food insecure," and nearly one in four children in Haiti suffer from chronic malnutrition, known as stunting, which has long-lasting physical consequences. According to the Global Nutrition Report, 21.9% of Haitian children under five years old are affected by stunting, indicating chronic malnutrition. Less than half the population has access to clean drinking water, a rate that compares poorly even with other less-developed nations. Haiti's healthy life expectancy at birth is 63 years. The World Health Organization (WHO) estimates that only 43 percent of the target population receives the recommended immunizations. This article will examine Haiti's healthcare infrastructure, prevalent public health challenges, and international initiatives aimed at enhancing health outcomes in the nation.

In 2013, there were approximately 800 primary care facilities in Haiti, with only 43% of these facilities being classified as good for accessible care. Only 8% of people living in rural areas have access to one of these facilities.

In terms of health care spending, Haiti ranks last in the western hemisphere. Economic instability has limited any growth in this area. Per capita, Haiti spends about US$83 annually on health care. There are 25 physicians and 11 nurses per 100,000 population. Only one-fourth of births are attended by a skilled health professional. Most rural areas have no access to health care, making residents susceptible to otherwise treatable diseases. In 2003, for example, the WHO confirmed an outbreak of typhoid fever in Haiti that, because of a lack of access to doctors and safe water, led to dozens of deaths.

Haiti has the highest incidence of human immunodeficiency virus/acquired immune deficiency syndrome (HIV/AIDS) outside of Africa. Sex tourism and lack of health education led to the beginning of the epidemic in the early 1980s. Estimates vary, but the United Nations projects the national prevalence rate to be 1.5 percent of the population. Other estimates place the rate as high as 5 percent in the urban population and 3 percent in rural regions. Annually, 5,000 Haitian babies are born infected with the AIDS virus. The disease causes a fifth of all infant deaths and has orphaned 200,000 children. Haiti also continues to face challenges with communicable diseases, including vector-borne illnesses such as dengue and malaria.

The Human Rights Measurement Initiative finds that Haiti is fulfilling 72.9% of what it should be fulfilling for the right to health based on its level of income. When looking at the right to health with respect to children, Haiti achieves 87.0% of what is expected based on its current income. In regards to the right to health amongst the adult population, the country achieves only 83.2% of what is expected based on the nation's level of income. Haiti falls into the "very bad" category when evaluating the right to reproductive health because the nation is fulfilling only 48.3% of what the nation is expected to achieve based on the resources (income) it has available.

== Issues ==
=== Structural violence ===
Structural violence, as defined by medical anthropologist Dr. Paul Farmer, is a source that is negatively affecting Haiti's healthcare system and the health of the Haitian people. Structural violence is the way by which social arrangements are constructed that put specific members or groups of a population in harm's way. Such groups include females and those belonging to lower socioeconomic classes Being one of the world's poorest countries, Haiti illustrates how prevailing societal frameworks perpetuate the suffering of certain individuals and communities. Due to social factors such as pollution, poor housing, poverty, and varying forms of social disparity, structural violence prevents the citizens of Haiti, particularly those living in rural areas or coming from lower social classes from receiving proper clinical treatment and medicine. Studies have suggested by addressing unfavorable biosocial phenomena, such as poverty and social inequality, the negative impacts of structural violence on health can be reduced and that improvements to both healthcare access and health outcomes in Haiti can be attained.

== Mental Health Care ==
Natural disasters such as the earthquake in 2010 are the main causes of trauma and loss in Haiti; these events can have a severe impact on mental health. With only 10 psychiatrists and 9 psychiatric nurses serving Haiti's public sector as of 2003, the prevalence of mental illnesses is unknown. However, the distribution of diagnoses seen at one psychiatric hospital in 2010 was as follows: 50% schizophrenia, 30% bipolar disorder with mania, 15% other psychoses and 5% epilepsy.

Most healthcare facilities are located in urban areas, and of those only 30% are public; 70% of those in rural areas are private and provide mainly primary health care. Structural barriers such as cost, distance and location prevent most people in Haiti from utilizing professional biomedical services. Instead, many people rely on a health care system composed of Roman Catholic, Protestant or Vodou (which combines West African traditions and Catholicism) practices. Health professionals in Haiti often use religious leaders as allies to serve as consultants, as they gain the patients' trust more readily.

While members of the upper and middle classes mainly practice Vodou in times of crisis, those from the lower class follow the beliefs and practices more closely. Mental health problems are often considered to be consequences of a spell, a hex, a curse transmitted by an enemy or failure to please the spirits. Because health professionals are unable to offer a biomedical explanation for most mental illnesses, many Haitians utilize a combination of medical, religious and Vodou sources when available.

Since January 2010, Partners in Health and Zanmi Lasante have employed 14 psychologists, 35 social workers and assistants, and many other mental health professionals to meet the needs of earthquake victims in Haiti. Within two years these organizations provided 44 psychiatric evaluations, 2,431 psychosocial evaluations and 2,223 ongoing mental health visits. They have also provided school-based mental health education for 13,694 high school-aged students and teachers to teach children the signs and symptoms of mental illness, as well as strategies for combating stress.

== Maternal and Child Healthcare ==
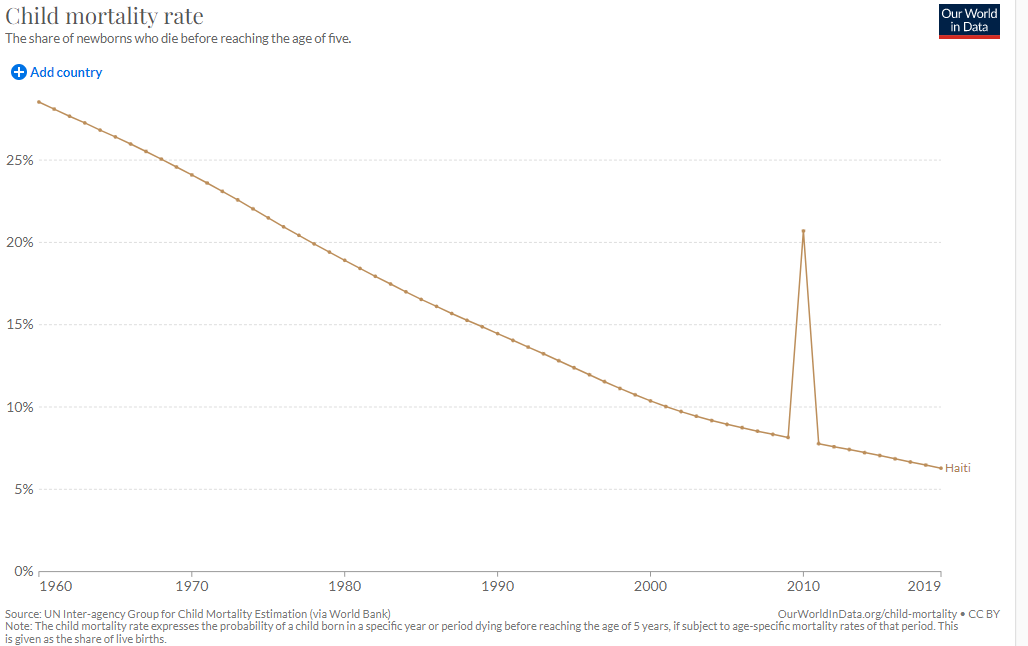
Development of child mortality rate in Haiti since 1961

The 2015 maternal mortality rate per 100,000 births for Haiti is 359. This is compared with 582.5 in 2008 and 898.2 in 1990. The under 5 mortality rate, per 1,000 births is 89 and the neonatal mortality as a percentage of under 5's mortality is 31. In Haiti the number of midwives per 1,000 live births is 1 and the lifetime risk of death for pregnant women 1 in 93. As of 2021, Haiti's maternal mortality rate remains among the highest in the region, with significant challenges in accessing quality prenatal and postnatal care.

Due to political, economic, and social instability of the country, there are not enough resources to educate and provide care for women who are pregnant. Based on a survey of human rights experts administered by the Human Rights Measurement Initiative in 2017, Haiti is doing only 47.6% of what should be possible at its level of income on the right to reproductive health. This is measured by the percentage of women who are practicing or whose sexual partners are practicing, any form of contraception. According to the high maternal mortality rates, Haitian women and girls die from complications related to pregnancy and childbirth more often than those in any other developed country. There are a wide variety of reasons why many women and girls face death when trying to carry a child to term. One such reason is that the majority of births in Haiti occur at home. Most postnatal deaths occur from women delaying seeking treatment, the amount of time it takes to reach a treatment center, the lack of available resources and/or physicians at the care center, and a lack of funds.

Acute diarrheal disease, intestinal infectious diseases, perinatal infections, malnutrition and acute respiratory infections are among the leading causes of infant death in Haiti. Infectious diseases and parasitic diseases are the most common causes of death in young children. Adolescent death is often a result of HIV/AIDS, violence, tuberculosis, typhoid and maternal death. AIDS, intestinal infections and complications during pregnancy are responsible for most maternal deaths.

Among the numerous responsibilities of women in Haiti such as employment and domestic work, mothers are also responsible for childcare and family health. The international health planning approach combines interventions that are essential to child survival, such as the GOBI strategies (growth monitoring, oral rehydration therapy, breastfeeding and immunization). The success of this primary health care program is reliant upon the behavior of mothers, as scientists anticipate that once a mother takes on one of these strategies, she will be more receptive to other strategies.

Clinic-based care requires families to rearrange their daily schedules so that an adult can travel to the clinic where they expect to wait for long periods. The most common home-based illness treatment is the use of oral rehydration therapy to treat diarrhea in children. Since each household has a limited number of utensils that are constantly in use, this treatment is often delayed until a suitable container is available. The need for boiling water also delays the treatment until the hearth space is available. Mothers must meet daily subsistence needs, attend market activities, and cope with everyday family problems; these responsibilities leave little time to travel to the clinic to have their babies immunized.

The widespread practice of Vodou throughout Haiti has led to the conception of several folk diagnoses intended to explain various symptoms of mental illness, all of which pose a great risk to pregnant women. In the rural areas of Haiti, midwives deliver babies and are responsible for most prenatal and postpartum care. The first month after giving birth is spent in seclusion with the baby, while women close to the mother provide for her needs; this is believed to prevent rapid disequilibrium of the mother's body, which can be passed to the baby resulting in tetanus or diarrhea. It is also believed that distress, fright or negative emotions can cause the mother's milk to spoil, resulting in diarrhea or skin rashes; the milk could then become too thick resulting in depression in the mother and impetigo in the infant.

Many Haitians also believe in pedisyon, which involves the diversion of uterine blood from the fetus, leaving it in a state of arrested development while the mother loses blood from it. Once cured, the gestation process resumes and a normal baby can be born. Health professionals view this as an erroneous folk diagnosis to explain infertility, but this perception serves numerous functions for infertile women. Because women are not considered adults in Haiti until becoming a mother, the inability to bear a child results in no economic support or other benefits of a conjugal relationship.

Many organizations have contributed to the recovery of Haiti since the earthquake in 2010. The Haitian Ministry of Health, with the support of the Pan American Health Organization (WHO/PAHO), the Canadian International Development Agency (CIDA) and the European Commission, underwent a project to fund free childbirth and care to poor women. The Society of Obstetricians and Gynecologists of Canada (SOGC) had begun working to address the maternal mortality rate. The Women's Refugee Commission has joined with other international partners and local organizations in the hopes of providing Haitian women with better reproductive health care. Workshops coordinated by the Women's Refugee Commission and the UN Population Fund (UNFPA) are seeking to set guidelines for meeting sexual and reproductive health needs during incidents of disaster. The strategies would include plans for providing services to prevent sexual violence, reduce HIV transmissions, and preserve the lives of women and children. As of 2009, clinics were reporting fewer deaths among both women and babies and a six-fold increase in antenatal visits.

== Impact of Foreign Aid and NGO Dependency ==
Haiti’s healthcare system has long been dependent on foreign aid and non-governmental organizations (NGOs) to provide essential medical services. While these organizations help address health disparities and emergency response needs, scholars and policymakers have raised concerns about sustainability, lack of coordination, and the long-term impact on Haiti’s public healthcare infrastructure.

=== NGO Dependency and Its Impact on Healthcare Services ===
Following natural disasters, political instability, and health crises, international organizations have stepped in to fill gaps in Haiti’s healthcare system. Many NGOs provide maternal care, infectious disease treatment, and emergency response services, often free of charge. However, this parallel healthcare system is largely independent of the Haitian government, leading to fragmented and uncoordinated service delivery. The Pan American Health Organization (PAHO) highlights that disease-specific and short-term aid initiatives often fail to contribute to long-term health system strengthening. One of the most affected areas is maternal health. While NGOs offer lifesaving services, access fluctuates based on donor priorities and funding availability. This has resulted in uneven access to prenatal, childbirth, and postnatal care, contributing to Haiti’s high maternal and infant mortality rates.

=== The Shift in Healthcare Workforce ===
A significant consequence of NGO dominance is its effect on Haiti’s healthcare workforce. Due to low wages, poor working conditions, and limited resources in public hospitals, many Haitian doctors and nurses choose to work for NGOs that provide higher salaries and better infrastructure. This has led to a two-tier system, where the public sector struggles to retain skilled professionals while NGOs attract medical talent. Furthermore, international NGOs have contributed to the emigration of Haitian healthcare workers, as NGO employment often serves as a stepping stone for migration to countries like the United States and Canada. The loss of skilled workers, weakens Haiti’s ability to develop a self-sufficient healthcare system, further entrenching reliance on foreign aid.

=== Lack of Coordination and Fragmentation of Healthcare Services ===
Haiti’s healthcare system is characterized by a lack of coordination among foreign aid organizations, resulting in inefficiencies, resource duplication, and inconsistent care. NGOs often function independently of the Haitian Ministry of Health, creating a patchwork of services rather than an integrated healthcare system. This issue became apparent during the cholera epidemic, when multiple organizations implemented overlapping but uncoordinated interventions instead of following a national health strategy. Without a centralized approach to healthcare delivery, resources are often misallocated, and public health initiatives fail to create lasting improvements.

=== Sustainability vs. Short-Term Aid ===
Some NGOs focus on capacity-building initiatives aimed at training local healthcare workers and strengthening hospitals. However, many aid efforts remain short-term, prioritizing immediate relief over long-term development. Research suggests that a more effective approach would involve integrating NGO-led services into Haiti’s public healthcare system, ensuring that foreign aid supports systemic improvements rather than creating parallel structures. However, power imbalances and the dominance of foreign-led initiatives often prevent Haitian health professionals from taking leadership roles in their own healthcare system.

== Traditional Medication ==
As part of their healthcare system, many Haitians rely on traditional medicines, spiritual healing and herbs to cure ailments. Herbal doctors, called doktè-fèy, administer treatments for wounds, fevers, and skin conditions using roots, local plants, roots and barks. Some believe in voodoo alternatives. TikTok health influencer Lissel Severe is known for pushing this globally.

== See also ==
- HIV/AIDS in Haiti
- List of hospitals in Haiti
- Water supply and sanitation in Haiti
- Deafness in Haiti
- COVID-19 pandemic in Haiti
