= National HIV Testing Day =

National HIV Testing Day may refer to:

- National AIDS Testing Day (El Salvador), June 27, HIV/AIDS in El Salvador
- National HIV Testing Day (United States), June 27
