= International rankings of Haiti =

International rankings of Haiti include economic, health, and political data.

== Economy ==
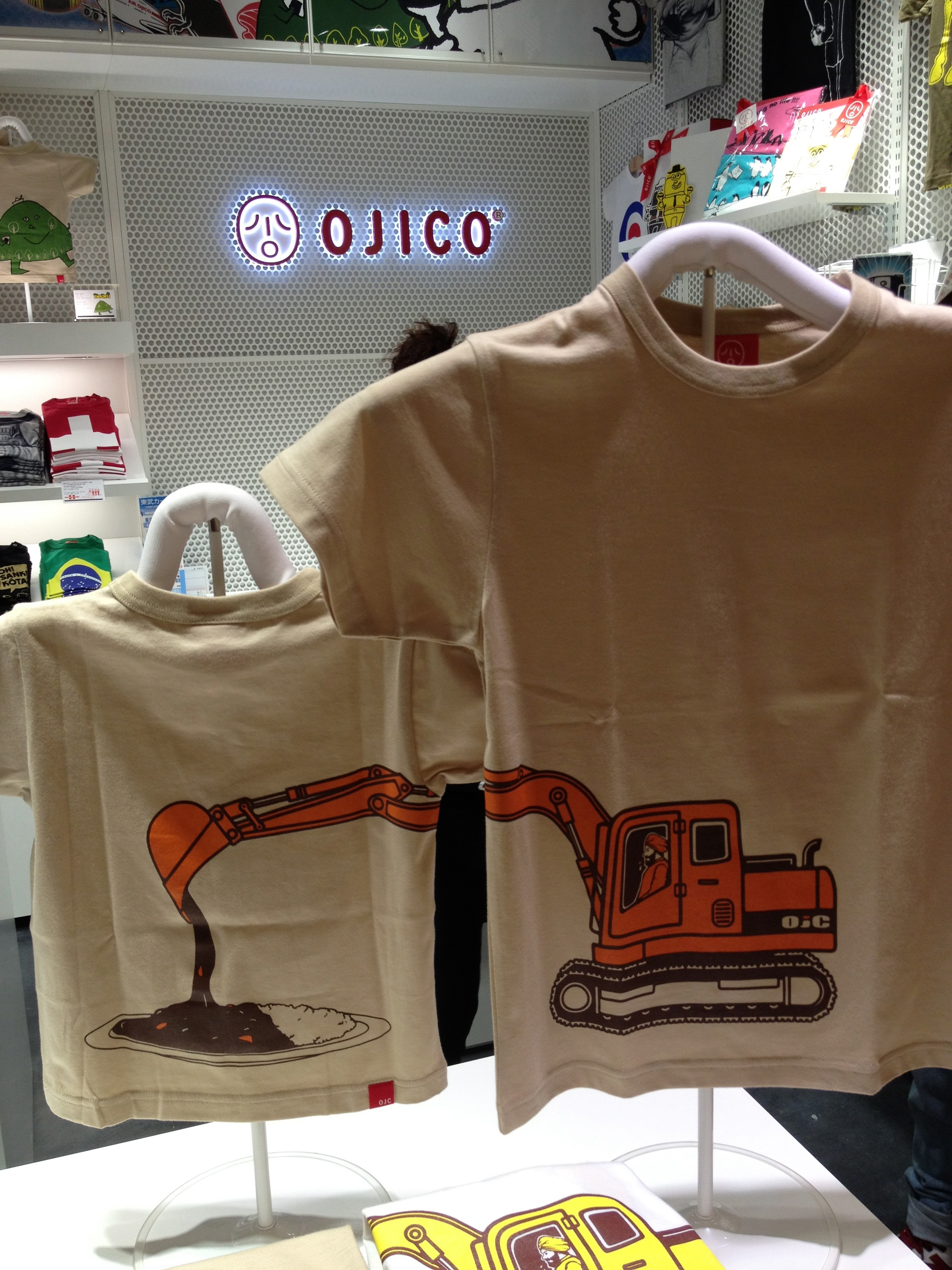
Textiles, such as T-shirts account for 40% of Haiti's exports

- World Bank 2015 Nominal GDP ranked 141 out of 194 economies

== Politics ==
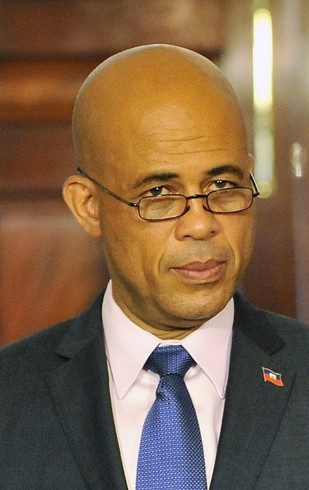
Former President Michel Martelly, whose term in office ended in 2016, was characterized by political stalemate, delayed elections, and an array of challenges in unstable democratic institutions.

- Transparency International 2015 Corruption Perception Index ranked 158/168 countries (lowest ranking in the Caribbean)
- The Heritage Foundation's 2016 Index of Economic Freedom ranked Haiti 150th among nations in its economic freedom.

== Society ==
- United Nations Development Programme 2015 Human Development Index: ranked 163 out of 188
- University of Leicester 2006 Satisfaction with Life Index 118 out of 178

== See also ==
- Lists of countries
- Lists by country
- List of international rankings
