= Jamaica Red Cross =

Jamaica Red Cross Society
- Formation: 8 April 1948
- Type: Aid agency
- Purpose: Humanitarian aid
- Headquarters: Central Village, Saint Catherine Parish, Jamaica
- Location: Jamaica
- Affiliations: International Federation of Red Cross and Red Crescent Societies
- Website: https://www.jamaicaredcross.org/

The Jamaica Red Cross Society is a humanitarian aid agency in Jamaica.

== History ==
The Jamaica Red Cross was founded in 1948 as a branch of the British Red Cross. In July 1964, the British Red Cross transferred control to a new national society, which in October 1964 was officially recognised by the International Committee of the Red Cross.

Following Hurricane Gilbert in 1988, the Jamaica Red Cross was very involved in providing aid. Over 2,500 volunteers worked 14-hour shifts providing relief. They also had support from the League of Red Cross Societies, with additional supplies arriving from their warehouse in Panama.

== Programmes ==
The Jamaica Red Cross Society is governed and administered a Central Committee. The term of office for its members is two years.

The organisation has executed various programmes to mitigate the harms of HIV/AIDS in the country.
