= HIV/AIDS in Belize =

Disease in Belize

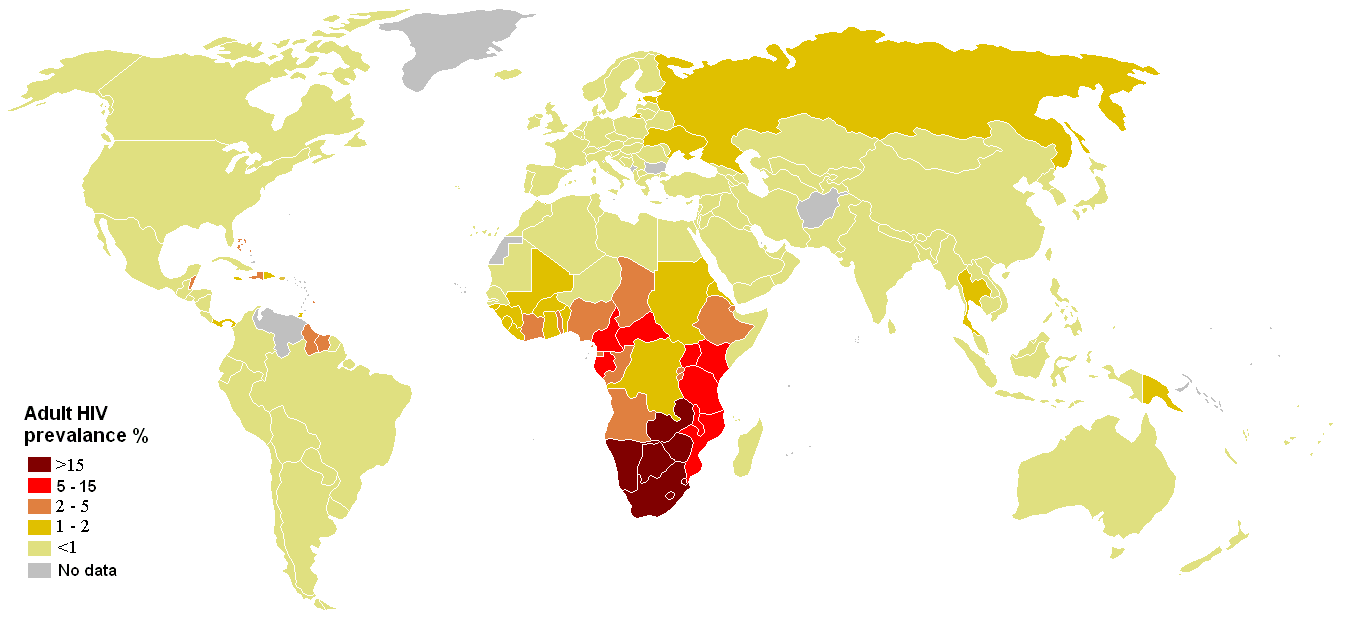
Map of adult HIV prevalence by country in 2008, with Belize identified at 2-5%.

HIV/AIDS in Belize affects about 1.10% of the population, giving the country the highest prevalence in Central America. As of 2023, it is estimated that 3,600 adults and children are living with HIV in Belize. This total number of people living with HIV in Belize has consistently increased year-to-year since 1990. Subpopulations may have a concentrated epidemic, with concentrations in men who have sex with men (MSM) and transgender women.

== Prevalence ==
Representing approximately 1.1% of the population, Belize is reported to have one of the highest HIV prevalence rates in Central America. This percentage was as high as 2.1% in 2011 reports, which was the third-highest rate in the wider Caribbean after the Bahamas and Haiti. The 1.3% prevalence in 2024 still exceeded the Caribbean average, although new infections in Belize have been declining faster than the regional average since 2010.

The majority of people living with HIV in Belize are women, and HIV testing rates among women have increased from 2006 to 2015. As of 2023, approximately 86% of people living with HIV are aware of their status, and 49% of people living with HIV are on antiretroviral therapy (ART). There is also co-management of tuberculosis (TB) and HIV treatment. Further to men who have sex with men (MSM), with a HIV prevalence of 13.9% in 2012, and transgender women, prisoners in Belize are also vulnerable to HIV with a 5.8% prevalence in 2016.

According to UNAIDS, and estimated 3,600 people were living with the disease, including 3,500 adults (over the age of 15) and about 100 children under the age of 15. Since 2010, new infections have fallen by 23% but HIV/AIDS–deaths have increased by 29%.

== National response ==
In February 2000, the Cabinet created the National AIDS Commission of Belize. The government implemented prevention programs along with 2015 and 2020 goals. Belize continued to address HIV/AIDS during the COVID-19 pandemic. A new national HIV strategic plan is underway for 2021–2025.

Belize has collaborated with organizations such as the World Health Organization (WHO), Pan American Health Organization (PAHO), UNICEF, and UNAIDS to address the transmission of HIV and related diseases. For example, the Minister of Health and Wellness highlighted eliminating mother to child transmission of HIV as a priority. A 2025 study identified prioritizing antiretroviral therapy (ART) as necessary for national HIV epidemic control.

== See also ==
- HIV/AIDS in North America
- HIV/AIDS in the Caribbean
- HIV/AIDS in Latin America
