= HIV/AIDS in Nicaragua =

Nicaragua has 0.2 percent of the adult population estimated to be HIV-positive. Nicaragua has one of the lowest HIV prevalence rates in Central America.

== History ==
HIV was first detected in Nicaragua in 1987, after concentrated epidemics had been reported in other Central American nations. The onset of the epidemic was likely delayed by Nicaragua's 10-year civil war and the U.S.-led economic blockade, both of which left the country isolated for several years. Relative control over commercial sex work, low infection rates among injecting drug users, and a ban on the commercial sale of blood also slowed HIV transmission.

== Dynamics ==
Nicaragua is at risk of a broader epidemic because of social conditions such as multiple sex partners, gender inequality, and widespread poverty. Many people are unaware of their HIV status and could unwittingly spread the disease. UNAIDS estimates Nicaragua has 7,300 HIV-positive people, nearly half of whom were identified over the past three years.

Sexual activity is the primary mode of HIV transmission in Nicaragua. Unprotected heterosexual intercourse is reported to account for 72 percent of HIV infections, and unprotected sex between men is estimated to account for 26 percent, according to UNAIDS. However, it is likely that the former is over-reported and the latter under-reported because of stigma and discrimination (S&D) against homosexuals. HIV prevalence among men who have sex with men (MSM) is significantly higher (7.6 percent) than among sex workers or the general population.

A 2002 study reported by UNAIDS demonstrated that infection levels among MSM were 38 times higher than among the general population. The latest study on HIV among commercial sex workers reported by UNAIDS demonstrated a prevalence of only 0.2 percent in that group. As of September 2005, more than half of reported HIV cases occurred among 20- to 39-year-olds, in Nicaragua's 2006 United Nations General Assembly Special Session on HIV report.

Factors that put Nicaraguans at risk include early sexual debut; social pressures for males to have multiple sexual partners and take sexual risks; widespread poverty; women's and girls’ inability to negotiate when and under what circumstances to have sex or use condoms; gender-based violence; and sexual abuse of women and girls. Compounding these factors, access to HIV/AIDS services and information is limited in much of the country due to budgetary priorities and limitations. Moreover, conservative religious and social values make it difficult to talk about sex and ways to protect oneself from disease or unwanted pregnancy.

== National response ==
Traditionally, HIV/AIDS prevention has not been a national priority in Nicaragua because HIV prevalence is low. The National Program for the Prevention and Control of HIV/AIDS and Sexually Transmitted Infections was not established until 1998. Before that, the Government of Nicaragua enacted the Law for the Promotion, Protection and Defense of Human Rights of People Living With HIV/AIDS (Law 238) in 1996, but the law did not go into effect until 1999. Law 238 created the Nicaraguan AIDS Commission (CONISIDA) in 2000, which is tasked with enforcing the law and guiding the national response to HIV/AIDS. However, CONISIDA lacks the organizational and technical capacity to effectively fulfill its role in supporting government and civil society efforts to assist people living with HIV/AIDS (PLWHA) and prevent the spread of HIV. Of particular concern is CONISIDA's failure to adequately ensure the rights of PLWHA.

The Country Coordinating Mechanism, formed in 2000, has a variety of prominent members, including representatives from government; multilateral, nongovernmental, and educational organizations; the private sector; religious groups; and representatives of PLWHA. It oversees the HIV/AIDS grant from the Global Fund to Fight AIDS, Tuberculosis and Malaria. The Global Fund grant is for more than $10.1 million from 2004 to 2009. The purpose of the grant is to build on the existing national strategic plan for HIV/AIDS and other sexually transmitted infections (STIs) by strengthening prevention, care, and support activities; by ensuring comprehensive care for PLWHA; and by documenting all AIDS cases within the national surveillance system.

In 2006, the government approved a new national strategic plan for 2005 to 2009 and a new national AIDS policy. Current efforts focus on increasing the response capacity of the health sector and ensuring the sustainability of measures and actions taken. The Ministry of Health (MOH) has integrated its HIV/AIDS and tuberculosis programs and adopted protocols for treating co-infected patients; however, it has not been able to achieve efficient coordination of the two programs in practice. Nicaragua is also strengthening primary care and implementing awareness, prevention, and protection efforts.

Nicaragua is a partner in the Brazil+7 initiative, a UNICEF-, UNAIDS-, and Brazilian-led effort dedicated to expanding HIV/AIDS prevention, treatment, and care for pregnant women and young people; to offering universal access to antiretroviral medication for PLWHA; and to ensuring universal access to services for preventing mother-to-child transmission. The other partner countries are São Tomé and Príncipe, Bolivia, Paraguay, Cape Verde, Guinea-Bissau, and East Timor.

== See also ==
- HIV/AIDS in North America
- Healthcare in Nicaragua
