= HIV/AIDS in Honduras =

Honduras is the Central American country most adversely affected by the HIV/AIDS epidemic. It is estimated that the prevalence of HIV among Honduran adults is 1.5%.

== History ==
In a 1998 report released by the office of the Honduran Secretary of Public Health, the incubation period, during which HIV/AIDS was first introduced into the Honduran population without being recognized, is estimated to have been during the end of the 1970s and into the early 1980s. In 1984, the first case of HIV/AIDS in Honduras was identified in a man who reported having travelled to San Francisco multiple times in the years preceding his diagnosis, which was confirmed in 1985 when he tested positive for Kaposi's sarcoma and antibodies for HIV. Four men, all reporting having traveled outside of the country, constituted the first cases recognized in Honduras. Three of those men were likely to have contracted HIV from homosexual transmission, while one contracted the virus likely from heterosexual transmission.

By 1992, the 100 Honduran cases of HIV/AIDS included almost every risk group associated with HIV/AIDS: men who have sex with men (MSM), men who have sex with men and women (MSM/W), commercial sex workers, children of HIV-positive mothers, intravenous drug users, and blood transfusion recipients. Since spreading to other populations, HIV/AIDS is considered to be transmitted mainly heterosexually in Honduras and thought to have been introduced to the heterosexual population through bisexual transmission. Additionally, groups such as marines and soldiers, who have increased interaction with the exterior and are also more likely to have multiple sexual partners, contributed to the spread of HIV/AIDS throughout Honduras. A 1997 study found prevalence of 6.8% among military recruits.

In 1998, Honduras had the highest prevalence of HIV out of all seven Central American countries, in a study published by the office of the Honduran Secretary of Public Health. As of that same year, Hondurans made up only 17% of the Central American population, yet Honduras contained 50% of the initial AIDS cases in Central America and 60% of all Central American cases in 2001. In more recent years, new HIV infections have decreased by 29% since 2010 while AIDS-related deaths have increased by 11% since then.

HIV/AIDS heavily affects the young, active, working population in Honduras, and HIV/AIDS deaths account for 10% of the overall national mortality rate. As of 2008, AIDS was the leading cause of death among Honduran women of childbearing age and the second-leading cause of hospitalization among both men and women. Sexually transmitted infections are common, and condom use in risky sexual encounters is sporadic and variable. HIV remains a mainly heterosexual epidemic in Honduras, as 90% of emerging infections are attributed to heterosexual transmission.

== Prevalence and causes ==
=== Geographical predominance ===
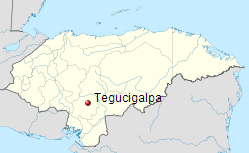
Map of Honduras, delineating its departments, and its capital Tegucigalpa

The areas most heavily affected by HIV/AIDS cases tend to be within what is called the Central Corridor of Development (Corridor Central de Desarrollo), affecting urban areas such as Tegucigalpa, San Pedro Sula, La Ceiba, El Progreso, Comayagua, Puerto Cortés, Tela, La Lima, and Choluteca. The disease originated in the northern part of the country, with especially high rates in Tegucigalpa and San Pedro Sula, which was the original epicenter of the disease.

In San Pedro Sula, rates of HIV prevalence were estimated to be as high as 14 to 21% of the population at the height of the epidemic in Honduras. HIV/AIDS has since spread to the south, east, and west of Honduras, including the Honduran Bay Islands in the Caribbean, though these regions were affected later. Municipalities with the highest reported incidences of HIV infection are found on the border with neighboring countries El Salvador, Guatemala, and Nicaragua. On the northern coast of Honduras, the Garífuna minority group experiences particularly high rates of HIV prevalence.

=== Demographical predominance ===
HIV/AIDS has most affected young people in Honduras, ranging from 20 to 39 years of age. The main risk groups associated with HIV/AIDS in Honduras are female sex workers (FSWs), men who have sex with men (MSM), the Garífuna community, prisoners, and transgender women.

The United Nations Joint Programme on AIDS (UNAIDS) released the following statistics regarding the HIV prevalence among different risk groups in Honduras:

- 5.3% among sex workers
- 11.7% among gay men and men who have sex with men
- 11.9% among transgender people

Prevalence rates among prisoners have been found to be as high as 7.6%. In 2005 the national prevalence among sex workers was 9.68% according to a UNAIDS document on CONASIDA. 47% of the cases of HIV recorded in 2004 were women, and in that same year around 0.5% of women in antenatal surveillance studies were HIV positive. Overall, women account for more of emerging infections than men do.

=== Proposed national causes ===
While it is not known exactly why the epidemic in Honduras became so severe, some experts, such as epidemiologists like Manuel Sierra, attribute its severity to the long incubation period of the disease in the country. Other reasons to which specialists attribute the state of the Honduran epidemic include increased international military presence due to the Cold War, during which Honduras experienced an influx of both international military personnel and also contras from neighboring Nicaragua, who helped to stimulate the commercial sex industry on a national level.

=== Among the Garífuna ===
The Garífuna, of Afro-Caribbean descent, are one of at least eight minority groups within Honduras and one of the few for which HIV prevalence rates are known. Heterosexual transmission rates among the Garífuna are comparable to those of sub-Saharan Africa. As of 2005, the prevalence of HIV among the Garífuna was estimated to be somewhere between 8 and 14% of this population.

Among this population, condom use was reported in 2009 to be only 10.6% in stable couples and 41.4% in casual couples. HIV was higher among Garífunas residing in urban areas. In addition to low condom use and urban living, researchers suggest that the high rates of HIV prevalence may be due to the migratory working patterns of Garífuna men, who often travel seasonally to the United States or cities, such as San Pedro Sula where HIV prevalence is particularly high, for their jobs in shipping and fishing. Other possible contributing factors are sexual violence, the inability of women to control their sexual experiences, multiple sex partners, remuneration received for sex, with 6% of subjects reporting having received money for sex in a 2009 study, and first sexual encounters for men at 15 and women at 17.

Prevalence among Garífuna was 3.8% among men and 5.1% among women as of 2006, indicating rates more than three times those of the national average. In a 2015 study, men were found to be more than four times as likely to have had multiple sex partners within the last 12 months than women. Garífuna women remain an especially disenfranchised group and have been subject to treatment methods as radical as forced sterilization. Only 9% of Garífuna men were reported to have been circumcised, which is proven to be a successful method at lowering risk of HIV contraction through heterosexual transmission by as much as 60%. High rates of other sexually transmitted infections (STIs) such as syphilis and herpes (HSV-2) were also found among the Garífuna in a 2009 study, and high rates of other STIs are linked to a higher risk of HIV infection.

Although traditional health care is available to some within this community, the Garífuna have also developed their own methods of educating their community and spreading knowledge of prevention: utilizing their traditional musical forms to accompany informational plays about HIV/AIDS. Organizations, such as the Pan American Social Marketing Organization (PASMO), have adopted similar education tactics, such as bingo games in which each space on a playing card contains a picture of HIV/AIDS or another STD.

== National response ==
=== Early response ===
National efforts to reduce the number of new HIV infections have been in place since the late 1980s. The national response to HIV/AIDS has been led by the Ministry of Health, with collaboration from other ministries and several nongovernmental organizations (NGOs). The Health Secretariat solidified the creation of the National AIDS Control Program (PNS) between 1989 and 1994 in an effort to improve health infrastructure, create a national counseling network, and standardize treatment for Hondurans living with HIV/AIDS. During this same time period, the National AIDS Commission (COMSIDA) was also founded.

Since the beginning of its involvement in preventing the spread of HIV, the Honduran government has sought to establish multi-sector programs, such as COMSIDA, which was reorganized in 1999 into CONASIDA, with fifteen national institutions or organizations represented. Similarly, the Strategic Plan for the Fight Against AIDS, in place from 1998 to 2002, included the response capabilities of both governmental and nongovernmental bodies and organizations. By the beginning of the 1990s, blood began to be screened for HIV on a national scale in Honduras, five years after the US began screening blood donations. HIV/AIDS cases due to blood transfusions began to decrease by 1991.

=== Recent response and current policies ===
HIV/AIDS was declared a national priority between 2002 and 2006 under President Ricardo Maduro, who publicly committed himself to support the national response to HIV/AIDS and identified HIV/AIDS as one of five health issues to receive priority government attention.

Current programs focus on prevention, education, comprehensive care, and the rights of HIV-positive people. Prevention efforts, executed among various governmental and nongovernmental organizations like NGOs, churches, and schools, have specifically targeted groups especially at risk for HIV/AIDS, such as sex workers, members of the gay and lesbian community, mobile populations, and members of the Garífuna ethnic population. In the education system, teachers were trained in 2005 to educate their students about reproductive health, STIs, and HIV/AIDS, and these topics have become integrated into the national curriculum in Honduran schools.

Despite these education and awareness efforts, in 2013, still around half of Hondurans infected were unaware they were living with HIV. Honduras’s long-term plan is to prevent new infections and to provide services to those who are most at risk for HIV infection, including young people, sex workers, men who have sex with men, institutionalized persons, and the Garífuna ethnic group. In 2017, the Ministry of Health resolved to cover all treatment for those living with HIV, regardless of CD4 count, and internal funding covers 95% and 70% of treatment costs and preventative efforts respectively.

== International response and aid ==
The Global Fund to Fight AIDS, Tuberculosis and Malaria has disbursed US$90,720,054 of the US$96,502,161 originally signed to Honduras for HIV/AIDS programs alone. According to USAIDS, another international body that supports programs addressing HIV/AIDS in Honduras, Global Fund programs have three main goals: to promote the protection of the rights of people living with HIV/AIDS (PLWHA), create awareness surrounding risks and risk-reducing measures among particularly vulnerable populations, and make health services more accessible to these populations.

The Joint United Nations Programme on HIV/AIDS (UNAIDS) has been another significant supporter of HIV/AIDS prevention, treatment, and care in Honduras. Other international bodies that have assisted programs in Honduras include the Swedish International Development Agency, Canadian International Development Agency, Department for International Development (United Kingdom), Humanist Institute for Development Cooperation, Christian Aid, Catholic Relief Services, German Cooperation Agency, Cooperative for American Relief Everywhere, Inc. (CARE), and the Red Cross. USAID programs include partnership directly with the Honduran government through projects such as AIDSTAR-One (AIDS Support and Technical Assistance Resources) but also include funding of individual, local organizations and NGOs, such as Fundación para el Fomento en Salud.

Doctors Without Borders (Medecins sans Frotieres) has been active in Honduras since 1974. Their HIV/AIDS programs in Honduras focus on antenatal care and their servicio prioritario, or priority service, which consists of free and confidential post-exposure prophylaxis and psychological counseling to rape victims. As of 2017, Doctors Without Borders had provided 2,300 mental health consultations, 6,800 antenatal consultations, 800 postnatal consultations, assisted in 400 births, and treated 600 patients after experiences of sexual violence.

== Access to ARV treatment ==
Antiretroviral therapy was only offered in the Honduran public health system as of 2002. In 2001, 18 million lempiras were allocated to the purchase of ART in 2002, and the Honduran government aims to achieve universal ART access. Currently, the Honduran government spends 40 million lempiras annually to provide this treatment. In 2005, it was estimated that 4,500 people were receiving ART treatment, but CONASIDA estimated that only one-third of people with advanced HIV were actually receiving their drugs.

Beyond simply providing the antiretroviral drugs themselves, programs such as the Inter-institutional Alliance for the Improved Nutrition of People Living with HIV/AIDS (IMANAS) have attempted to alleviate among households receiving ART the added stressor of lack of food, which can negatively impact people's ability to adhere to their ART regimens. Despite these efforts, in a study published in 2011, researchers found that 87% of households receiving ART in Honduras were food insecure, which was reflected by the 15% of these households in which ART adherence was inadequate.

In 2013, 42% of people were still accessing health care and receiving treatment after 12 months, and one in three patients had reached an undetectable viral load. As of 2016, 51% of Honduras affected by HIV/AIDS were able to receive antiretroviral treatment (ART), and 54% of HIV-positive pregnant women were receiving treatment or had utilized prophylaxis as a means of prevention of mother to child transmission (PMTCT). As of 2018, a total of 12,789 individuals were reported to be receiving ART, according to El Heraldo.

== Activism ==
The Special Law on HIV/AIDS, passed by Congress and allowing CONASIDA to be formed in order to protect the rights of Hondurans living with HIV/AIDS, is attributed greatly to activism on the part of Hondurans living with HIV/AIDS and civil society workers in a 2005 special report created for the United Nations General Assembly Special Session on HIV/AIDS.

=== Honduran National Association of People Living with HIV (Asociación Nacional de Honduras de Personas que Viven con el VIH) ===
The Honduran National Association of People Living with HIV, in part facilitated by USAID funds, has served to empower those in Honduras living with HIV/AIDS and was established to protect their human rights. It was founded by Allan Dunaway, who served as its president and give a face to HIV/AIDS in Honduras and essentially all of Latin America, as he was one of the first Latin American HIV/AIDS activists. He and his wife, Rosa González, were the first couple to publicly reveal their HIV-positive status. Together, they founded Fundación Llaves. Dunaway worked directly with the National Commission of Human Rights (Comisionado Nacional de los Derechos Humanos). Representing their organization, Dunaway and his wife traveled to the International AIDS Conference in New York City in 2008.

== See also ==
- HIV/AIDS in North America
- HIV/AIDS in South America
