= HIV/AIDS in Guatemala =

HIV/AIDS in Guatemala is a prevalent issue in that country. As of 2023, it is estimated that 35,000 adults and children are living with HIV in Guatemala, or approximately 0.20% of the population. Of these people, approximately 72% are on antiretroviral therapy (ART).

With less than 1% of the adult population estimated to be HIV-positive, Guatemala is considered to have a concentrated epidemic. However, Guatemala–currently Central America's most populous country–accounts for nearly one-sixth of Central America's HIV-infected population.

== Prevalence ==
Since Guatemala's first case of HIV was reported in 1984, infections have occurred primarily among men who have sex with men (MSM), sex workers, and transgender people. According to the National AIDS Program (NAP) in the Ministry of Health (MOH), in April 2007, Guatemala had 10,304 officially reported cases of HIV/AIDS, with a subsequent 2008 estimation by UNAIDS that 61,000 people were living with HIV in Guatemala, and 2,700 deaths had occurred due to AIDS. According to UNAIDS 2023 data, the percent change in new HIV infections since 2010 is 13%, and the percent change in AIDS-related deaths since 2010 is -18%.

In the early-mid 2000s, the NAP estimated that 80% of reported HIV cases occurred among 15- to 49-year-olds, with 20- to 34-year-olds accounting for more than 51% of all cases.

National HIV prevalence among MSM is 10%. In Guatemala City, 18% of MSM were HIV-positive in 2006, according to baseline data collected for a Global Fund to Fight AIDS, Tuberculosis and Malaria project. A 2002 study published by UNAIDS in 2007 showed that infection levels among MSM in Guatemala were 10 times higher than in the adult general population. National HIV prevalence among sex workers is 4%, and among street-based female sex workers, prevalence is as high as 12%. In 2015, it was estimated that 23.1% of transgender people in Guatemala were living with HIV. In 2016 and as recently as 2022, it was estimated that 22.2% of transgender people in Guatemala were living with HIV, or roughly 4,400 individuals. Despite a global decline in new HIV infections among all women from 2010 to 2019, HIV infections have remained persistent amongst transgender women in Guatemala. Other vulnerable populations include prison inmates, with a reported prevalence of 3.2%, and at-risk youth and street children, with an HIV prevalence of 3.3%.

Guatemala's HIV-infected population lives primarily in urban areas along major transportation routes. According to Guatemala's 2007 National Epidemiological Center report, more than 77% of reported HIV/AIDS cases occurred in seven departments: Suchitepéquez, Guatemala, Izabal, Escuintla, Retalhuleu, San Marcos, and Quetzaltenango. Available data indicate that HIV has mainly affected urban and Ladino (mixed Amerindian-Spanish peoples) populations; however, preliminary data indicate that the indigenous population (primarily Mayans) potentially could be experiencing increasing HIV infections. The data are insufficient, however, to determine the extent of the epidemic within this population.

Several risk factors contribute to Guatemala's epidemic, including migration and tourism. While in transit, migrants may participate in high-risk sexual behavior, increasing their chances of becoming infected with HIV and other sexually transmitted infections (STIs). The Garifuna population, which shares cultural and ethnic characteristics with the Caribbean countries, is more at risk than the general population. The effects of HIV/AIDS are exacerbated by high poverty levels and limited access to health care, particularly among rural populations. According to the MOH, no cases of infection have been reported among injecting drug users or through blood or blood products.

The rate of HIV co-infection with tuberculosis (TB) is growing. The current rate of new TB infections is 34 per 100,000 people and a 2006 study cited by UNAIDS found that HIV prevalence among new TB patients in Quetzaltenango tripled from 4.2 to 12% between 1995 and 2002. TB is the most frequent opportunistic infection associated with HIV/AIDS in Guatemala.

== National response 1984 - Present ==
According to the 2003 AIDS Program Effort Index, a tool developed by the United States Agency for International Development (USAID) to measure the collective effort put into an effective HIV/AIDS response by individuals and domestic and international organizations, Guatemala had a score of 52, which is an improvement from the score in 1996 but still slightly lower than the average score of 55 for Latin America and the Caribbean region. It ranked highest in the areas of political support and prevention programs.

The NAP has been responsible for the surveillance of the epidemic since 1984. However, sentinel surveillance was not established until 1998. Over the past several years, the Guatemalan government has taken concrete steps to address the HIV/AIDS epidemic. A national strategic plan was produced from 1999 to 2003. Guatemala acknowledges HIV/AIDs in its Criminal Code, and in 2000, Guatemala established Decree 27-2000, General Law for the Fight against the Human Immunodeficiency Virus (HIV) and the Acquired Immunodeficiency Syndrome (AIDS) and for the promotion, protection and defence of Human Rights in the face of HIV/AIDS, including Articles regarding the communication of HIV/AIDS status.

At the end of 2005, Guatemala adopted a new national HIV/AIDS policy, along with a new strategic plan for 2006–2010. The plan charges the NAP with coordinating national responses, including those from civil society. UNAIDS works with the NAP, and USAID provides technical assistance to implement the national strategic plan and establish key universal access targets. Decentralization of AIDS care and prevention services throughout the country is an important priority.

In recent years, the NAP has improved communication with civil society and other institutions to coordinate national efforts. This has resulted in the establishment of NAP-led technical committees with multisectoral participation to address such issues as standardizing diagnosis, treatment, and care. Moreover, the Country Coordination Mechanism serves as an inter-institutional coordinating body, aimed at better implementing Global Fund projects. Guatemala is also implementing the Regional HIV/STI Plan for the Health Sector 2006–2015 of the Pan American Health Organization (PAHO). The Plan is designed to assist health services and systems in the Americas to more effectively respond to the HIV epidemic and prevent STIs.

Antiretroviral treatment (ART) coverage has expanded over the years, and currently, 76% of identified HIV-infected men and women who need treatment receive ART, according to the NAP. The recent WHO/UNAIDS/UNICEF report Towards Universal Access estimates that 52% of HIV-infected people who need treatment receive ART. However, because the slow expansion and decentralization of services, people living with HIV/AIDS (PLWHA) must travel long distances to obtain treatment, imposing cost burdens on them. There are major challenges in extending both prevention and care coverage outside the capital and other main cities. Furthermore, discrimination against PLWHA and vulnerable groups such as commercial sex workers and MSM remains a significant barrier to a more effective AIDS response in Guatemala. USAID has supported a national campaign focusing on the diversity of PLWHA to help break down barriers of stigma and discrimination (S&D) and promote respect for human rights related to HIV/AIDS.

Guatemala receives significant support from the Global Fund to expand prevention, care, and treatment activities among vulnerable groups and in priority geographic areas of the country. The objectives of the Global Fund are to expand prevention activities and ART services from the capital city to regions with the highest HIV incidence; to improve coordination among civil society organizations working in HIV/AIDS, and to reduce mother-to-child transmission of HIV by expanding voluntary screening and counseling for pregnant women. Bilateral donors, including USAID and European countries, also provide support for prevention, treatment, care, and health system improvement initiatives.

In March 2025, in response to United States government funding cuts on HIV programs in Guatemala, UNAIDS published concerns regarding risks and disruptions to service delivery, HIV prevention, and staff capacity.

== See also ==
- HIV/AIDS in North America
