= HIV/AIDS in the Caribbean =

As of 2024, the Caribbean continues to face a generalized epidemic with an average HIV prevalence rate of 1.2% annually since 2020. As of 2024, approximately 340,000 people in the Caribbean are living with HIV. In 2024, there were approximately 15,000 new HIV infections (13,000 of which were among adults aged 15 and older) and 4,800 AIDS-related deaths. The Caribbean has been the second-most-affected region in the world after Sub-Saharan Africa, and as of 2024 has similar HIV adult prevalence rates to UNAIDS regions of West and Central Africa (1.1 - 1.2%) and Eastern Europe and Central Asia (1.1–1.2%).

As of 2024, there was a national prevalence of at least 1% in the majority of Caribbean countries. These 2024 estimates also showed HIV prevalence among pregnant women reaching or exceeding 2% in eight countries: the Bahamas, Belize, the Dominican Republic, Haiti, St. Lucia, Suriname, and Trinidad and Tobago. According to The World Factbook in 2020, the Bahamas had an HIV/AIDS prevalence rate of 3.3%, which was the highest rate outside of Africa - there has since been a reduction in prevalence to as low as 1.1%.

Several factors influence this epidemic, including poverty, gender, sex tourism, and stigma. HIV incidence in the Caribbean declined 49% between 2001 and 2012, with a continued reduction in both new HIV infections and AIDS related deaths from 2010 - 2024. Different countries have employed a variety of responses to the disease, with a range of challenges and successes.

== Overview ==
Although the exact origin of the disease is unknown, the HIV epidemic in the Caribbean most likely began in the 1970s. The first reported AIDS case occurred in Jamaica in 1982, followed by eight cases among gay and bisexual men in Trinidad and Tobago. In the early days of the epidemic, more men were affected than women. By 1985, HIV/AIDS was becoming a general population issue and was no longer a disease solely of gay or bisexual men.

Contrary to popular belief, the primary mode of HIV transmission in the region is heterosexual sex. The number of new HIV infections among women became and continues to be higher than those among men. Currently, the Caribbean is the only area outside of Sub-Saharan Africa where women and girls outnumber men and boys living with HIV.

=== Prevalence ===
Among adults aged 25 - 44, AIDS was a leading cause of death. Between 2001 and 2009, new infections slightly declined. However, in 2009, about 1.0% of the adult population (240,000 people) was living with HIV, which was higher than any other region except Sub-Saharan Africa. Despite progress since 2010, the reduction in the annual number of new HIV infections slowed during 2019 - 2023.

New HIV infections have been reduced by 21% in the Caribbean from 2010 - 2024, lower than the global reduction of 40%. In 2023, Cuba, the Dominican Republic, Haiti, and Jamaica comprised nearly 90% of 15,000 new HIV infections. In particular, solely Haiti accounted for 38% of new HIV infections. In 2022, people from key populations accounted for 47% of new infections, and in 2024, young people (15–24 years) accounted for 25% of new infections overall. From 2010 - 2014, there was a 62% decline in AIDS-related deaths in the Caribbean, better than the global average of a 54% decline.

Compared to the regional average of 1.2%, there is a degree of variation in HIV prevalence between Caribbean countries. As of 2024, the highest rates of HIV prevalence are in Guyana, Suriname, and Haiti, all at 1.6%. These are followed by Belize (1.2%), Antigua and Barbuda (1.1%), Bahamas (1.1%), Jamaica (1.1%), and the Dominican Republic (1.0%). Cuba has maintained a relatively low rate, reported as under 0.2% and currently estimated to be 0.6%. Other countries like Saint Kitts and Nevis (0.8%), Saint Vincent and the Grenadines (0.8%), Dominica (0.5%), and Saint Lucia (0.4%) also reported rates in 2024 that were relatively low for the region.

The HIV/AIDS epidemic in the Caribbean appears to have been overshadowed by the seemingly more severe problems in Sub-Saharan Africa, Asia, and countries with more active and highly visible activism.

== Causes and spread ==
=== Social factors ===
A variety of social factors have perpetuated the spread and worsened the severity of HIV/AIDS in the Caribbean. Many persons are at increased risk of HIV infection because of their social vulnerability, arising from poverty, illiteracy or limited education, unemployment, gender inequity, and sexual orientation. HIV/AIDS can weaken the national education system, perpetuating the spread of the disease by hindering efforts to educate the public about the disease. Furthermore, a weak political response by the government can result in ineffective programs.

Public policies in some countries openly discriminate against HIV-positive people, placing the burden of responsibility on the family of the infected individual. Discrimination also takes place in housing, employment, and public accommodations, and currently little is able to be done. Because of these factors, many have less knowledge, skills, and motivation to practice safe-sex and avoid the disease.

==== Women ====
Gender plays an important role in the spread of HIV. Young women are more likely than men to contract HIV in the Caribbean, and most of these women are between 24–44 years old. In developing countries in general, women are at an extreme disadvantage in terms of the prevention and treatment of HIV. The gender hierarchies found within many societies contributes to the correlation of women and HIV. One of the factors that put women most at risk is sexual violence. The first sexual experience of a girl is often forced, and during unprotected vaginal intercourse, women are more likely than men to contract HIV, because HIV-infected semen has a higher viral concentration than vaginal secretions.

The Capability Approach, outlined by Nussbaum's Central Capabilities, lists bodily health and bodily integrity as crucial components of human dignity, and both of these are violated in the case of HIV transmission through rape. Furthermore, sexual relations between older men and younger women during transactional sex possibly explain why more teenage girls than boys are HIV-positive in the Caribbean.

==== Men who have sex with men ====
Sexuality has also had a significant impact on HIV/AIDS in the Caribbean. The prevalence of HIV among men who have sex with men (MSM) seems to be high, though reliable, current data is lacking. The HIV prevalence rate across the Caribbean between MSM varies, ranging from 11.7 percent in the Dominican Republic (1996) to 18 percent in Suriname (1998) to 33.6 percent in Jamaica (1996). While unprotected sex between men is undoubtedly a major contributing factor to the epidemic, it remains largely hidden in the data. In many Caribbean countries, gay sexual relations remain illegal. This has led to a heavy stigma associated with same-sex relationships.

This stigma and widespread discrimination are definite factors in the spread of HIV. In Trinidad and Tobago, one in five MSM were HIV positive, and out of those, one in four said they also have sex with women. Because of the stigma and discrimination, these men hide their same sex behavior and become involved with women who do not know about their sexuality. This has created a bridge for HIV to pass from the gay community to the general population.

=== Cultural factors ===
Several factors within Caribbean cultures play a role in HIV transmission. Firstly, sexual patterns exist in several countries that foster the spread of the disease. There is a high level of sexual activity among the youth, as evidenced by the 22 to 32 percent of persons in six eastern Caribbean states reporting having sex before age 15. Furthermore, having multiple sexual partners within the past year is relatively common throughout the Caribbean.

The commercial sex industry, transactional sex, and sex tourism in the Caribbean are likewise important factors. HIV infection rates for commercial sex workers are high, ranging from 4.5-12.4 percent in the Dominican Republic (2000) to 9 percent in Jamaica (2005) to 30.6 percent in Guyana (2000). One possible explanation is that the use of condoms in transactional sex is less likely. In addition to the specific industry of sex tourism, studies have shown that the general tourism industry is positively correlated with the HIV epidemic. The perceived connection exists in that there are aspects of the environment of a tourist area that foster higher risks for HIV infection. These include riskier behaviors on the part of locals and tourists, as well as employees of the tourism industry engaging in relations with the tourists.

Intravenous drug use also plays a small role in perpetuating the spread of the disease, though it is not very common in many countries. However, two notable exceptions are Bermuda and Puerto Rico. In Bermuda, the prevalence rate is around 43 percent, while in Puerto Rico almost 80 percent of HIV infections arise from drug injection.

=== Economic factors ===
The economies of the Caribbean influence the spread of HIV/AIDS as well. Firstly, the cost of HIV on many facets of life, outside of simply human well-being, was underestimated in the past. The disease hindered both the growth and the development of the island nations that make up the region. Because of rising mortality and falling productivity due to illness, the labor force in several industries has been negatively affected. Several aspects on individual economies will also experience negative impacts of HIV, from agriculture to tourism to finance. There have also been observed correlations between condom use and economic security, with those in more impoverished situations being less likely to practice safe sex.

Studies have tried to identify a relationship between poverty and susceptibility to HIV. Many have indicated that HIV/AIDS can have a negative impact on socioeconomic status, as well as the level of overall employment in a given country.

== Examples by country ==
=== Haiti ===
Haiti, a nation that shares the island of Hispaniola with the Dominican Republic, has been greatly affected by HIV. The adult prevalence rate of HIV was estimated to be 1.93% in 2014 and 1.6% in 2024. For some time, Haiti had highest rate in the Americas and the highest outside of Sub-Saharan Africa. Like many other countries, the disease began as being associated with men who have sex with men, specifically men in Haiti who engaged in commercial sex with male tourists. However, Worobey et al confirm that there is no evidence that HIV was initially brought to Haiti by homosexual men, or that it started among the homosexual community in Haiti. They note that the highest incidence of HIV infection in Haiti in the 1980s was among female prostitutes who engaged with heterosexual men.

The course of the disease in Haiti has been rapid and aggressive, compounded by high rates of tuberculosis and other diseases of poverty. A large number of children were born to HIV-positive mothers before proper treatment was available, leading to a spike in infant mortality. Negative effects have been observed in Haiti, one being the impact on the economy due to a shrinking tourism industry. The response of the healthcare in Haiti has been fairly effective. Due to swift identification of the disease, a coordinated response was undertaken relatively quickly.

Several measures were taken, such as giving the Haitian Red Cross complete control of the blood bank, launching a national awareness campaign, and setting up local health units that provide HIV treatment with antiretroviral drugs. Although Haiti has undergone civil unrest for several years, a priority was placed on the HIV/AIDS epidemic, and strong relationships were formed with the private health sector. Through both prevention and care, Haiti continues to manage the spread of the disease.

=== Barbados ===
The adult prevalence rate of HIV in Barbados was previously estimated to be 1.5% and more recently in 2024 as 1.0%. When HIV first struck Barbados, the island nation was underprepared to handle such a significant and detrimental disease. The first case was recognized in 1984, after which those infected with AIDS were heavily stigmatized. In contrast to system in Haiti, much of the healthcare response in Barbados was carried out by the public sector. Several successes of Barbados in its fight against HIV include universal screening, confidentiality, an AIDS information center and hotline, and special attention focused on at-risk groups. Overall, the achievements should undoubtedly be praised, especially considering the fact that these responses were carried out during an economic depression in the 1990s, as well as during a period of severe stigmatization of HIV-positive people.

=== Jamaica ===
Jamaica is another island nation that has been hit hard by the HIV/AIDS epidemic, with a previous adult prevalence rate of around 1.5% which as of 2024 is now 1.1%. AIDS was the leading cause of death among two at-risk groups, young children aged 1–4 and young women aged 20–29. Both the public and private health sectors have played important roles in the response to the epidemic. From providing healthcare to seeking international funds, instituting educational programs to providing condoms, the Jamaican government has done much in prioritizing the HIV crisis.

Notably, as part of their strategic plan. Jamaica has set of goal of normalizing HIV as part of normal societal discourse. This would undoubtedly help to reduce stigma towards HIV-positive individuals. The relative successes of the Jamaican program are also notable, as the country has managed to secure its blood supply, expand STI treatment centers, introduce proper surveillance of HIV, and make condoms widely available. Jamaica still seeks to strengthen its response, especially in terms of reducing discrimination and expanding prevention and intervention programs.

=== Cuba ===
The current HIV adult prevalence rate in Cuba is estimated to be about 0.6%, which is low both globally and in the region. Three of the major modes of transmissions in other nations, mother-to-child transmission, transmission through blood transfusion, and through intravenous drug use, are virtually non-existent in Cuba. Instead, sexual contact accounts for approximately 99 percent of all cases. In terms of sexuality, Cuba has followed a trajectory nearly opposite of the norm. Most of the first cases diagnosed were heterosexual men, but the disease then crossed over into the gay community as male-to-male sexual contact began to spread the disease. Today, men who have sex with men (MSM) are one of the most at-risk groups, making up for around 72% of men infected with HIV in Cuba.

With the establishment of the Working Group for Confronting and Fighting AIDS, the government and nongovernmental organizations created comprehensive measures to fight the disease. Firstly, Cuba banned the importation of all human blood products and destroyed potentially infected supplies, effectively eliminating transmission of HIV through blood transfusions. Next, the country provided wide-scale HIV testing for Cubans who had travelled abroad and potentially brought the disease back into the country. The most important measures served to prevent sexual transmission, namely through education programs, medical examinations, and admittance of HIV-positive individuals into specialized health centers called sanatoria. These sanatoria were somewhat controversial, especially in terms of possible human rights violations. Although severely isolated in the late 1980s, the program has since improved significantly, providing outlets for social integration and multiple levels of care.

== Responses ==
The responses to the HIV/AIDS epidemic in the Caribbean have varied over time and across countries. In the 2001 Nassau Declaration on Health, the Caribbean Community (CARICOM) declared the HIV/AIDS crisis to be a priority for the region. As part of their response, the Pan-Caribbean Partnership Against AIDS (PANCAP) was formed. Today, this partnership is made up of over 80 members, including Caribbean countries, AIDS organizations, and nongovernmental organizations (NGOs). Sources of funding include the World Bank, UNAIDS, and the Global Fund for AIDS, TB, and Malaria. Three principles that are crucial to the effective control of HIV are the inclusion of HIV positive persons, prevention and treatment programs that are carried out simultaneously, and the reduction of stigma.

Broadly, increased political will, affordable and accessible antiretroviral drugs, stronger NGOs, and the generous aid of donors have combined to improve access to treatment. Testing pregnant women for HIV and providing antiretroviral drugs has significantly reduced the rates of mother-to-child transmission. Improving awareness of safe sex practices through HIV education and prevention programs, as well as increasing contraceptive distribution, can reduce the rates of sexual transmission.

Specifically, childhood sex education is important in helping kids to develop lifelong safe-sex practices like consistent condom usage and reducing risk by delaying sexual activity. Although it does play a minor role in the Caribbean, IV drug use still contributes to the spread of the disease. There is evidence that the harm reduction model, including needle and syringe exchange, is effective at preventing HIV with no other harmful effects. Other responses include screening blood banks to reduce transmission through blood transfusion, increasing HIV screening and testing, and advocacy to establish responsive governmental policies.

In 2010, only 53,000 people living with HIV were on treatment in the Caribbean, and 13,000 adults and children died due to AIDS-related conditions. By 2024, 250,000 people living with HIV were on treatment in the Caribbean—with 50,000 of them added between 2020 and 2024.

== Challenges ==
Several challenges have hindered the response to the HIV crisis. First, many countries have weak national capacities in terms of their ability to manage, control, and address the epidemic. This management also presents technical challenges for developing countries with varying levels of technological advancement. Because of the many regional governments and international aid agencies, the response to the spread of the disease is often uncoordinated and less effective than it could be. Political factors that affect the response include inattention to or a lack of concern about HIV and incomplete or slow information flow.

The stigma associated with both HIV-positive people and the perceived connection to the gay community is often crippling, resulting in discrimination, low use of testing facilities, and increased transmission of the disease. While this is certainly improving, there is still also a lack of information regarding how HIV/AIDS affected specific groups, like commercial sex workers, men who have sex with men, and IV drug users. Without substantive and concrete information, it remains difficult to completely address the needs of the groups. It also remains difficult to fully implement HIV interventions in several areas, and in-depth research is needed to truly understand how these interventions function to help HIV-positive individuals.

In 2023, approximately 85% of people living with HIV in the Caribbean knew their status. Approximately 74% of all people living with HIV in the Caribbean were on treatment. Approximately 66% of all people living with HIV were virally suppressed, which was an increase from 33% in 2017. The number of people living with HIV who were both on treatment and virally suppressed rose by 8% from 2018 (79%) to 2023 (87%). HIV treatment coverage in the Caribbean was 78% among women (aged 15+ years), 65% among men (aged 15+ years), and only 39% at the pediatric level.

AIDS-related deaths in the Caribbean have decreased by 57% since 2010, largely attributed to greater treatment usage. While 6,100 people in the Caribbean died of HIV/AIDS in 2020, there were approximately 4,800 deaths in 2024. However, recent increases in deaths have been reported in Belize, Cuba, Guyana, and Suriname. The late diagnosis of AIDS remains a significant challenge in the Caribbean.

== See also ==
- AIDS pandemic
- HIV/AIDS
- Diseases of poverty
- Inequality in disease
- Gender inequality in the English Caribbean
