= HIV/AIDS in El Salvador =

HIV/AIDS in El Salvador has a less than 1 percent prevalence of the adult population reported to be HIV-positive. El Salvador therefore is a low-HIV-prevalence country. The virus remains a significant threat in high-risk communities, such as commercial sex workers (CSWs) and men who have sex with men (MSM).

== Prevalence ==
Overall prevalence has increased since the first case was detected in 1984. Since that time, 18,282 HIV/AIDS cases have actually been reported in the country. Incidence appears to have declined since 2004, but there is a fear that because of the lack of an effective monitoring system, many HIV/AIDS cases are not reported (according to a UNAIDS May 2006 report, 40 to 50 percent of cases are under-reported). Heterosexual sex is the main route of HIV transmission in El Salvador, accounting for 79 percent of HIV cases in the country.

The epidemic is predominantly in urban areas and is becoming increasingly feminized as the percent of women with HIV rises. Although prevalence is 3 percent among sex workers, it is as high as 16 percent in specific areas, such as Puerto de Acajutla. Prevalence is also high among MSM (17.8 percent, the highest in Central America). One study from 2002 reported by UNAIDS in 2007 demonstrated that infection levels among MSM in El Salvador were 22 times higher than among the general population. Moreover, stigma and discrimination (S&D) against MSM lead to hidden behaviors, and, as a result, there is probably considerable under-reporting of the epidemic among this group.

The National AIDS Program (NAP) estimates that 51 percent of reported AIDS cases occur in the 25- to 34-year-old age group. Although estimates vary, about 85 percent of infections are sexually transmitted, of which 4 percent are cases of homosexual transmission and 3 percent bisexual transmission. According to the national sexually transmitted disease (STD) and HIV/AIDS program, the range for new HIV/AIDS infections per day is between 4.5 and 5.5 cases. Mortality due to AIDS represented the seventh-leading cause of death in hospitals for the population as a whole and the leading cause in the 20 to 59 age group. El Salvador contributes 18.4 percent of all cases in the Central America subregion and has the third-largest number of cases behind Honduras and Guatemala.

Factors that put El Salvador at risk of a larger epidemic include early initiation of sex, limited knowledge or practice of preventive practices among people engaging in high-risk behaviors, and the country’s large mobile population. The National Health Survey conducted in 2002 and 2003 indicated that 32 percent of females aged 15 to 19 were already sexually active. Knowledge about HIV/AIDS remains somewhat limited, as evidenced by one multicenter study in which 40 percent of MSM had false beliefs about the modes of transmission of HIV. Among sex workers, an estimated 90 percent do not use condoms with regular partners. Compounding these issues are S&D toward HIV-infected individuals and at-risk groups, which can deter people from getting tested and receiving adequate support if they have the disease.

== National response ==
Although the Government of El Salvador began initial HIV/AIDS prevention activities as early as 1988, stigma surrounding HIV persists. In 2001, El Salvador passed legislation protecting patients’ rights and guaranteeing access to treatment. El Salvador’s NAP was established in 1987, and it continues to work closely with various state ministries, civil society, the private sector, and nongovernmental organizations (NGOs). The country is now implementing its fourth HIV/AIDS strategic plan for 2005 to 2010. The new plan aims to improve the population’s knowledge about HIV/AIDS, strengthen preventive and protective measures, and extend coverage of HIV/AIDS services for vulnerable groups.

Following the worldwide Three Ones principles, El Salvador formed the National AIDS Commission (CONASIDA) to act as the country’s AIDS coordinating mechanism. One of the achievements of CONASIDA was the development of the 2005 National Policy for Comprehensive HIV Care. Important government activities include signing the Declaration of San Salvador for fighting AIDS in Central America and the Caribbean and the creation of an HIV/AIDS/sexually transmitted infection (STI) prevention program for mobile populations. The latter is particularly important because El Salvador is a corridor for migrants. El Salvador is also implementing the Regional HIV/STI Plan for the Health Sector 2006-2015 of the Pan American Health Organization.

Free HIV testing began in El Salvador in 1997, and in January 2002, the Ministry of Health (MOH) began to offer antiretroviral treatment (ART). By December 2006, 174 health facilities and two mobile clinics offered HIV testing for free, and 3,447 people were receiving ART without charge. In cooperation with other countries in the region, the Salvadoran Government negotiated with major pharmaceutical manufacturers and received price reductions on antiretroviral drugs. Currently, 39 percent of people infected with HIV who need ART receive it. In 2003, the country began a national program called Make the Decision to Wait to teach adolescents about safer sexual behaviors and to abstain from sex, and in 2005, two major campaigns were launched to combat stigma against people living with HIV/AIDS (PLWHA).

President Elías Antonio Saca González declared June 27, 2007, National HIV Testing Day. With the support of the U.S. Agency for International Development (USAID), the regional NGO Pan American Social Marketing Organization (PASMO) managed the event’s publicity campaign. The campaign resulted in 54,461 tests, exceeding the 40,000 target. Nearly three times the normal monthly average of tests done in all of 2006 were conducted on this one day. The Global Fund to Fight AIDS, Tuberculosis and Malaria is also currently supporting the MOH and the United Nations Development Program to develop a strategy for fighting HIV/AIDS in vulnerable populations to help poverty reduction. Despite these efforts, improved monitoring and surveillance and campaigns to raise awareness are needed.

== See also ==
- HIV/AIDS in North America
