= Health in Panama =

Taiwan donates 3,000 boxes of flu medicine to help Panama fight the recent outbreak of H1N1. (2016/06/27)

Even though Panama has one of the fastest growing economies in the western hemisphere, an estimated 500,000 people (13.8% of its population) are in extreme poverty. Panama has major socioeconomic and health inequalities between the country's urban and rural populations. The indigenous population lives in more disadvantaged conditions and experiences greater vulnerability in health. In general, the population living in more marginalized areas has less service coverage and less access to health care.

== Burden of disease ==
The burden of disease in Panama consists mainly of non-communicable diseases (76,99% of total deaths). Communicable diseases stands for 13,17% of total deaths, and injuries 9,84% of total deaths.

The top 10 causes of total deaths in 2017 were; ischemic heart disease, stroke, Alzheimer's disease, diabetes, chronic kidney disease, lower respiratory infection, interpersonal violence, COPD, HIV/AIDS and road injuries

The top 10 causes for DALYs (Disability Adjusted Life Years) were; diabetes, ischemic heart disease, headache disorder, stroke, interpersonal violence, HIV/AIDS, lower respiratory infections, road injuries, neonatal disorders and congenital defects

== Life expectancy ==
Life expectancy at birth in Panama was 75 years for men in 2016 and 81 years for women. There was a 9-year gap in 2014 between Panama City with the highest life expectancy, 79 years, and the indigenous reservation Ngäbe-Buglé Comarca the lowest at 70 years.

== Maternal mortality ==
Maternal mortality remained at 58.5 deaths per 100,000 live births in 2014, with major differences between urban areas (30.6 deaths per 100,000) and rural areas (110.8 per 100,000). The disparity was particularly acute in indigenous territories (303.4 per 100,000 in the Ngäbe Buglé region). Thus, Panama did not meet the goal for reduction of maternal mortality set by the Millennium Development Goals, which called for no more than 12.5 deaths per 100,000 live births.

== Child health ==
In 2014, the infant mortality rate was 13.8 per 1,000 live births in Panama, while neonatal mortality was 7.9 per 1,000 live births, up from 6.8 in 2010. Thus, the infant mortality target (for the first year of life) of 6.3 per 1,000 live births was not achieved. There are inequalities, as evident in the disparity between the country's highest infant mortality rate (21.0 per 1,000 live births in Guna Yala) and the lowest (6.6 in Los Santos).

In 2019, child mortality or the under-five mortality rate was 14,9 per 1,000 live births.

== Malnutrition ==
Panama have The Double Burden of Malnutrition which refers to the coexistence of both under-nutrition and over-nutrition in its population. In 2013, 15.9% of school-age children suffered from chronic malnutrition, and 3.4% had serious stunting. Chronic malnutrition is more prevalent in areas with indigenous populations. 33.8% of children aged 6 and 59 months and 23.2% of pregnant women suffer from anemia. In 2008, an increase in overweight was observed at the national level, with a prevalence of 10% in pre-schoolers, 30% in schoolchildren, 25% in adolescents, and 57% in adults.

== HIV/AIDS ==
Panama has a concentrated HIV/AIDS epidemic, with the 2006 adult prevalence rate estimated at 0.92%. In 2016, there were 21.000 people living with HIV in Panama, 54% were accessing antiretroviral therapy. Since 2016, the Ministry of Health has provided free HIV treatment for all.

The rate of HIV infection is increasing in Panama. Since 2010, new HIV infections have increased by 9% and AIDS-related deaths have increased by 20%. The key populations that are most affected are transgender people (15%), gay men and other men who have sex with men (13,06%), Prisoners (6,4%) and sex workers (2%).

== Neglected Tropical Diseases ==
Panama has a range of Neglected Tropical Diseases (NTDs) such as Malaria, Dengue, Chikungunya, Leishmaniasis, Soil-transmitted helminthiasis, Hookworm, Chagas disease, and more recently also the Zika virus. Most of the NTDs are present in the country's rural regions. The indigenous populations are especially vulnerable to neglected tropical diseases.

== Sanitation ==
In 2015, improved-water coverage in the country was 95% (98% in urban areas and less than 50% in rural and indigenous communities), while 75% of the population (84% in urban areas and 58% in rural ones) was covered by improved sanitation services.

== Health workers ==
In 2011, there were 29.2 health workers per 10,000 inhabitants, exceeding the goal of 25 per 10,000 set by the Pan American Sanitary Conference. However, the distribution of health workers is inequitable (in 2011, only 12.3% of doctors were serving in the country's rural areas, where 33% of the population lives). Moreover, in 2011, the presence of health workers was much lower in indigenous regions, where no CSS (Caja de Seguridad Social, or Social Security Fund) facilities or personnel were present.

== Healthcare ==
Healthcare in Panama is provided through a system through the government and a private sector. The public sector is funded through the Ministerio de Salud, (MINSA) and the Social Security Fund (Caja de Seguro Social), which operate separate facilities.
