= Gender inequality in the English Caribbean =

Gender inequality in the English Caribbean refers to gaps between individuals based on gender in the Anglophone countries of the Caribbean. These disparities persist in areas such as human and physical capital endowments, economic opportunities, and the ability to make choices to achieve desired outcomes (agency).

Caribbean countries have been moving toward compliance with the United Nations' Convention on the Elimination on Discrimination Against Women (CEDAW), but according to the UN Women Caribbean department, there is still work to be done to achieve gender equality in the region. In the English-speaking Caribbean, women are disadvantaged in the labor market as well as the legislature, whereas men and boys face unequal outcomes in education. Amartya Sen's capabilities approach asserts that all inequalities, including those relating to gender, keep individuals from securing opportunities and choosing from these opportunities to achieve desired outcomes.

== Background ==
The Caribbean is made of the chain of islands that border the Caribbean Sea and the Atlantic Ocean. The region also includes mainland regions such as Guyana that identify culturally and historically with those island. The Caribbean region is made up of many developing nations. Most of the islands of the English-speaking Caribbean have less than a century of independence from colonialism and, by the world's standards, their governments are fairly young. In recent decades the world has seen significant changes in GDPs and other economic and globalization factors leading to increased inequality within and between countries. "In the last ten to fifteen years the Latin American and Caribbean region has undergone the most significant changes of economic policy since World War II." Many of these policies were expected to create new jobs and greater equality. Still “people in Latin America and the Caribbean region face unequal opportunities in life and different chances of economic success and very unequal outcomes ” Areas such as education, labor and politics are just a few but important areas in which gender inequality is apparent in the region. Growing GDPs and globalization however, are not enough to offset the effect of gender inequality. With the exception of education women bear most of the negative impacts that occur as a result of gender inequality in the Caribbean region.

== Labor and migration ==
Women in the Caribbean make up a significant number of the labor force but still earn significantly less than their male counterparts. On average, 50 percent of women are a part of the formal sector as compared to more than 75 percent of men.

=== Unemployment ===
Unemployment rates are high throughout the region. According to the Central Intelligence Agency (CIA), the unemployment rates in Antigua and Barbuda are at 11 percent (2001 est), about 23 percent (2000 est) in Dominica, 20 percent in Saint Lucia (2003 est), and 25 percent in Grenada. Unemployment rates are especially high for women despite their higher educational attainment. According to the World Development Report of 2007/2008 the female unemployment rate in Jamaica is 207 percent of the male unemployment rate, in Guyana that number is 240 percent, in St. Lucia 164 percent, and 190 percent in Trinidad and Tobago.

=== Informal work ===
Informal work, as defined by Martha Chen, is work that may be unpaid or work that is simply not a part of the formal legal structure. Many women and men in the Caribbean region are engaged on a large scale in the informal sector. Within the informal sector however, there is earning discrimination. Men tend to do the work that earns high wages whereas women do the work that is considered domestic. Within the informal sector women earn less wages than men. This has important implications for the region because most households are headed by women who are the sole breadwinners. This may also contribute to the poverty gender bias in the region. Informal work does not provide benefits such as healthcare and are especially vulnerable to economic shifts and natural disasters. Women in this region have less access to credit and other avenues that would allow them to enter the formal sector, therefore, many of their businesses, such as shop keeping, belong to the informal sector. Occupations such as inter island trade are largely unprotected. There are no assurances for healthcare, pregnancy leave, or sick leave.

=== Formal work ===
Moves have been made at decreasing the gender bias in labor. Caribbean countries have put in place minimum wage levels as well as paternity and maternity leave. In this region many of the men employed in the formal sector are less qualified than their female counterparts and in fact, many are under-qualified. As a result, men are given more opportunities for onsite and occupational training. Women in the formal sector work less hours and earn lower wages. The Inter-American Development Bank reports that at every educational level, men earn higher wages than women. The wage levels for women with none, primary, and secondary education are similar. Women only see significant changes in their wages with tertiary education. This is not the case for men.

Cultural norms place the burden of care work and household work on women. Therefore, women are often forced into occupations that require them to reconcile their home responsibilities with their jobs. Many of the women who are employed within the formal sector, work as professionals which is a testament to their higher educational attainment. Still, there are fewer women in the workforce and they earn less than their male counterparts.

=== Migration ===
Within the Caribbean region, significant portions of the population participate in extra- and to a lesser extent, intra- regional migration. According to the World Bank, between 1989 and 2001, more than 1.4 million Caribbean nationals migrated legally to the U.S. Migration, especially for economic reasons, also has a significant gender impact. Since the 1960s more West Indian women than West Indian men migrated to the United States, Canada and the United Kingdom. Professionals, particularly those skilled in Health and Education, have moved out of the region in large numbers. Women often migrate with the hope of having their family follow years later or making enough money to provide stable lives for their families back home. The major migration of women out of the Caribbean region has a tremendous impact on a region known to have notoriously low marriage rates, and in which many households are headed by women. Many families construct extended family units in which childcare and housework are split among the women.

=== Migrant nurses ===
Migrant nursing programs find a large pool of recruits from the Caribbean. Traditionally nurses in the region were almost exclusively women. There are a substantial number of nurses from the Anglophone Caribbean working in the United States and an even greater number in the United Kingdom. Since 1980 as many as one third of Caribbean nurses are thought to have migrated. This has major implications for primary care facilities, such as health centers which rely on the region's nurses.

== Family life ==
The burden of care work (childcare, elderly care, and care for the sick) housework falls disproportionately on women in the Caribbean. Within the region there is little to no provision for free childcare so this burden has severe implications for women. Social norms permit women to work for the sustainment of their families, but also carries expectations about family life and customs, that favor men as breadwinners and women as homemakers. This is a surprising fact considering that women in the Caribbean have worked outside the home since the days of slavery, through indenture, and on through independence. These norms have a negative effect on the region because most households are headed by a sole female provider. Family life, child care, and elderly care often shapes women's wage work, constraining them to places near the home.

=== Marriage ===
Within the region, marriage rates are low. Common-law relationships are common as well as visiting relationships where one partner lives or works in another country or at another primary residence. The general expectation throughout the region is that women remain monogamous whereas it is more acceptable for men to have multiple partners. It is common for men to have multiple families.

=== Domestic violence ===
Violence against women is widespread throughout the region. According to UN Women Caribbean, 1 in 3 women in the Caribbean will experience domestic violence. Three Caribbean countries are among the top 10 for reported incidence of rape, and all Caribbean countries have higher than the world average for rape. The devaluation of women's work, decreases their bargaining power within the home and this leads to widespread partner violence. Both women and girls are affected by violence. A large percentage of girls report forced sexual initiation.

Most of the countries in the region have now fully criminalized rape within marriage and have added measure that give women full access to courts for orders of protection. Partnership for Peace, UN Trust Fund to End Violence Against Women, and other organizations are all working to end violence against women in region.

== Education ==
The countries of the Caribbean have a history of universal access to primary education and widely available secondary schooling. The Caribbean however, paints a different picture of gender and education than most of the other places in the world. With the improvements in economy female education level started following U-shape path. Throughout the entire Caribbean girls outperform boys during primary school, specifically in the areas of mathematics, English and reading. On the Caribbean Examination Council (CXC) exam, taken near the end of secondary school, girls were both more likely to score better than boys as well as outperform them across all subject areas. Reports have found that both the education of children's parents and their presence at home were significant in predicting children's attainment in school. This was especially true for fathers and male students who performed better when their fathers were both better educated and present in the home. Boys were more likely than girls to drop out before and during secondary school. Boys also had higher repetition rates. Women completed on average 13.3 years of schooling whereas their male counterparts completed 12.7 years. Women are enrolled in secondary and tertiary levels in greater numbers than men.

== Politics ==
Women in the English-speaking Caribbean gained the right to vote in their independent legislatures at the same time as men. The percentage of women who turn out to vote is similar to that of men; however, women are significantly underrepresented in the island legislatures.

=== Legislation ===
Women make up 15 percent of the islands' legislators. Within the region, the higher a country's GDP the more likely of women holding cabinet ministries. However, women's higher educational attainment throughout the region does not correlate with higher representation within government. Female ministers are more likely to head ministries traditionally associated with women such as, Education, Tourism, Housing and Culture. Dominica, Guyana, Trinidad and Tobago, and Jamaica have all seen women prime ministers or heads of state. Women in the region are largely underrepresented in politics. A former prime minister of Jamaica was a woman, the Honourable Portia Simpson-Miller. The Honorable Kamla Persad-Bissessar was the female prime minister of Trinidad and Tobago from May 26, 2010, to September 9, 2015. This is significant because these two islands have the largest GDPs in the English-speaking Caribbean region.

==== Dame Mary Eugenia Charles ====
Born May 15, 1919 Dame Eugenia Charles rose up to be the first female prime minister in the Caribbean and the first female Head of State in the Americas to be elected in her own right. Born on the island of Dominica, she went on to study economics in Canada and the London School of Economics. She then moved back to her native Dominica as the first female lawyer on the island. She opened a law firm but soon found herself active in politics. In 1968 she opposed the Dominica Labour Party's attempt to pass the Sedition Acts. She was appointed to the Legislature and the Assembly in 1970 and 1975 respectively. In 1972, she helped to found the Dominica Freedom Party, which helped Dominica gain independence from the British Crown on November 3, 1978. After the devastation of Hurricane David in 1979 Charles' plan for reconstruction helped her sweep the 1980 election. She led her country from 1980 to 1995 and became known as “The Iron Lady of the Caribbean.” Charles gained popularity on the world stage in 1983, when she encouraged the United States, under President Reagan, to invade Grenada after Cuban rebels had taken hold.

Charles' work in the area of reform, economics and Caribbean integration is notable. In 1991, Mary Eugenia Charles was knighted by Queen Elizabeth 11. Dame Eugenia Charles put in place the Women's Desk in her native Dominica and after her election it evolved into the Women's Bureau. This department provided for a more systematic involvement of women in development and was the first in the region.

Dame Eugenia Charles died on September 6, 2005.

== Poverty ==
Poverty in the English Caribbean affects both men and women. The combination of the burden of care work and lack of opportunity in the labor market for women translates into poverty having a very gendered impact in the region. Women have limited access to resources, such as land and especially credit. Like the other factors, this is significant in a region where a majority of the households are headed solely by women. In islands like St. Vincent and the Grenadines and across the region women head 96 percent of all poor households. In Dominica, where the number of poor men and women is almost equal (about 28.8 percent), only 20 percent of the male poor population is unemployed whereas 33.8 percent of poor women are unemployed. In St. Lucia as with many other countries, women in the lowest socio-economic bracket were very likely to have their first birth during their teen years.

== Progress ==
Over the past decade, the English-speaking Caribbean, under the lead of the Caribbean Community (CARICOM), has made significant strides in improving gender parity. The United Nations Women Caribbean is also working to reach gender equity in the region. The CARICOM Secretariat and the United Nations Development Fund for women (UNIFEM) formed a task force in 2005 charged with identifying region specific indicators for reaching the UN's development goals.

The Caribbean Association for Feminist Research and Action (CAFRA), has worked to end violence against women and to secure sex workers' rights. Individual countries have committed to putting in place women's councils. Dominica has had the Dominica National Council of women, which "aims to sensitize, empower, and unite women and their families." Moves are being made within the entire region to improve education for young men, to improve representation of women in the legislature, to improve their conditions in the workforce and to relieve the burden of care work.
