= Deafness in Haiti =

There is limited information on the extent of Deafness in Haiti, due mainly to the lack of census data. Haiti's poor infrastructure makes it almost impossible to obtain accurate information on many health related issues, not just the hearing impaired. In 2003, the number of deaf people in Haiti was estimated at 72,000, based on a survey provided by the World Health Organization.

Deaf people in Haiti face multiple barriers, not only from the lack of standard care and treatment, but also from the lack of specialist services like interpreters and sign language expertise. They may also be stigmatized, face discrimination, and even suffer violence due to cultural beliefs about the deaf. The justice system is either unwilling or unable to cope with deaf people.

The lack of employment available for people with disabilities has resulted in high levels of poverty, with most living under the poverty level. The Haitian government has established disability policies, however it is largely unable to enforce them.

== Language emergence ==
LSH (Langue des Signes Haïtienne), also known as Haitian Sign Language (HSL), is the language of the Deaf Community in Haiti. Although American Sign Language (ASL) is also widely used in Haiti, HSL is deemed to be the signed language of the Haitian deaf community. American Sign Language was used by the foreign aid programs based in Haiti to help the deaf community. There is not much information on the emergence of HSL, however, it is believed that Haitian Sign Language is influenced or derived from American Sign Language, because of the similarity between them and the prevalence of ASL among foreign aid programs. Haitian Sign Language is characterized as a deaf-community sign language, as it is mostly used among the Deaf Community in Haiti. In Haitian culture, being deaf or disabled is seen as a punishment for committing a sin or a curse from a higher power. Therefore, many deaf Haitians are in constant fear of using sign language (ASL or HSL) around the typical hearing community. The use of HSL is transmitted through education in Deaf schools and peer interaction.

== Significant organizations ==
There are many organizations that focus on helping the Deaf community of Haiti.

=== The Association des Sourds de Leveque ===
The Association des Sourds de Leveque focuses on strengthening the deaf community and advocating for the inclusion of the Deaf community in local and national decision-making, specifically in the case of risk and emergency situations. This organization was established in response to Article 11 of the Convention on the Rights of Persons with Disabilities, which addresses emergency situations and humanitarian emergencies.

=== Off the Grid Missions ===
Off the Grid Mission is a non-profit organization founded by Angela Maria Nardolillo, who is a hard-of-hearing woman. She traveled around the world (in hopes to help provide isolated Deaf communities with resources and supplies), where she observed the effects of language deprivation within the Deaf and Hard-of-Hearing (DHH) communities. The goal of Off-The-Grid missions is to help DHH communities gain easier access to resources, specifically in regions that are remote and considered to be a higher risk. The missions are unique to the region but mainly aim to provide emergency response and disaster relief resources. Off-The-Grid Missions is a Deaf-led organization with a team consisting of individuals from the Deaf and/or Hard-of-Hearing community. The Off-The-Grids mission in Haiti is currently ongoing and has helped Haiti's deaf community significantly. In 2010, a 7.0 earthquake struck Haiti, ultimately causing chaos within the country. After the Earthquake about 300,000 people died, homes and buildings were destroyed and it is estimated that 6,000 inmates escaped imprisonment. They have helped the Deaf community by providing tools and resources, such as sustainable footwear, assistance in creating businesses, educational resources (including Deaf schools), and providing activities for Deaf children, including soccer and Jiu-Jitsu training camps.

=== The Centre D'Aide Aux Personnes a Problemes Auditifs (CAPPA) ===
The Centre D'Aide Aux Personnes a Problemes Auditifs, also known as CAPPA, is a non-profit organization that promotes sign language and deaf education and advocates to bring the typical hearing community and the Deaf community together in Haiti. In addition, this organization also works to educate the Deaf community about serious and relevant topics such as sexual health (including pregnancy and STIs) and drug use.

=== Other Organizations ===
Service Chrétien d'Haïti and the National Committee for the Rehabilitation of Disabled Persons, work to educate, inform, and raise awareness about challenges the Deaf community in Haiti (and other communities) may face.

== Human and civil rights ==
=== Legal provisions and the CRPD ===
Haiti ratified the Convention on the Rights of Persons with Disabilities (CRPD), and Optional Protocol l in 2009. The deaf or hard-of-hearing community is mentioned a few times in the "List of issues in relation to the initial report of Haiti" document.

The document states that legal courts and the police do not have the resources to effectively communicate and interact with Deaf or Hard-of-Hearing people. In particular, it mentions that Haiti does not have interpreting services or language specialists for Deaf or Hard-of-Hearing individuals. The document explains that sign language should be used to effectively reach and communicate with the Deaf community. This issue has been addressed in a 2018 provision made to the Act on the Inclusion of Persons with Disabilities which has helped to address these issues; specifically helping to give people with disabilities easier access to the courts and providing statistics of services provided. However, these legal provisions have not been observed and there are no statistics provided, mainly due to the lack of observation.

In addition, the document mentions the murder of three Deaf Haitian women in 2016 and acknowledges the lack of justice and reparation. In an attempt to address this, the Office of the Secretary of State for the Inclusions of Persons with Disabilities and the National Federation of the Deaf worked together, in 2018 (and currently work), to help support and seek justice and reparation for the victims.

Another issue reported by the document was the lack of support, resources, and education for deaf children. The Government of Haiti has helped to address this issue by providing "special schools", such as the Montfort Institute for Deaf Children, with supplies and subsidizing salaries for teachers in 2018.

==== World Federation of the Deaf ====
Moreover, the World Federation of the Deaf (WFD) requirements for Haiti's CRPD were achieved in most of the articles. However, there are articles in Haiti's initial observation report that do not meet the requirements of the WFD.

- The WFD requires Article 2 to clearly state that sign language is equal to spoken languages. However, Haiti's Concluding Observations on the Initial Report document does not mention sign language in Article 2.
- The WFD requires Article 21.b to allow deaf people to choose their official method of communication, which is not mentioned in the Concluding Observations on the Initial Report of Haiti document.

=== Everyday Realities for Deaf Haitians ===
==== Voting ====
Deaf Haitians have the right to vote, however, there are barriers making it difficult for them to engage in voting. One main challenge that makes it difficult for deaf Haitians to vote is that most of the information regarding voting, such as political candidates and polling places, is transmitted via the radio, which completely disadvantages the deaf community.

==== Stigmatization and cultural beliefs of deafness ====
In Haiti, deaf people are seen as worthless and are considered to be below the disabled community. The reason that disabled people are considered to be above deaf people is that, even though they were still disabled, they possess the ability to communicate verbally and hear. Moreover, the Deaf community of Haiti is not labeled as "deaf" by society but rather labeled "bèbè", which translates to dumb. Labeling the deaf community as "bèbè"has significantly increased discrimination in the workplace and when accessing basic resources. Also, healthcare professionals deny deaf Haitians care knowing that the person can not verbally defend themselves, forcing them to go elsewhere. In Haitian Creole culture, it is believed that disabled people are cursed or are being punished for committing sin, which significantly impacts and threatens the safety of the Deaf community in Haiti. This belief has led to the Deaf community being isolated and abused.

==== Violence towards the deaf community ====
Four deaf women, Majorie Célestin, Jesus "Sophonie" Gelin, Monique Vincent, and Vanessa Previl, have been brutally tortured and murdered in Haiti due to the beliefs held about Deaf individuals. Majorie Celestin was raped and tortured by six men and was later found dead with organs removed, such as her heart and eyes. Jesus "Sophonie" Gelin, Monique Vincent, and Vanessa Previl were lured into a house where they were beaten, mutilated, and burned. These inhumane crimes have received a lack of public attention and justice.

== Early hearing detection and intervention ==
There is no early hearing detection screening system established in Haiti, which results in many Deaf Haitians not knowing whether they were born Deaf or became Deaf. Due to the lack of healthcare services, audiological services, and medical records, many families discover their child is Deaf anywhere from infancy to the age of six or eight. Upon discovering their child's deafness, some families take their children to hospitals to receive medications, and others to voodoo ceremonies. There are very few services available and no government-sponsored programs to help families that have children with disabilities. Deaf children have more access to hearing technologies than to sign language resources. This is due to the large number of non-government organizations (NGOs) that specifically focus on meeting the medical needs of Haitians. There is a hearing clinic supported by Comcare International, a religious USA-based organization, which focuses on providing solar-powered hearing aids to unreached people.

== Language deprivation ==
In Haiti, the deaf community has more access to hearing equipment (that is provided by non-government organizations) than support and resources for learning sign language. There are no sign language interpreting services in Haiti. There is also a lack of accessibility to sign language and sign language education. For example, there is only one school (as of 2003), PAZAPA, that employed a teacher who was adequately qualified to teach sign language to students. This teacher offered sign language classes to parents of deaf children and other people in the community that showed interest. ASL is the sign language used by Deaf Haitians who were fortunate enough to receive an education at deaf schools. However, most Deaf Haitians rely on home signing or have little to no language accessibility.

== Primary and secondary education ==
Haiti offers a variety of educational services, such as private schools, public schools, and schools run by international aid organizations However, most of the public schools are run by private entities because of the Haitian government's lack of control over the education system. There have also been rare instances, where Deaf Haitians have attended USA-based educational programs through the Center for Intercultural Education and Development.

In Haiti, less than half of all school-aged children are enrolled in school, which has resulted in a high illiteracy rate (between 50%-85%). The United Nations Educational, Scientific and Cultural Organization (UNESCO), estimates that, in Haiti, only 2% of disabled children are enrolled in school and less than 1% of those children are receiving special accommodations to meet their needs. The children that receive special accommodations are most likely enrolled in private schools (that are costly), which provide a more supportive environment.

=== Barriers to Deaf education ===
Primary and secondary Deaf schools in Haiti report that they are experiencing a lack of resources, including equipment, trained personnel, and books of all kinds, such as sign-language and educational books, and financial backing. Most of the teachers employed at Haitian Deaf schools do not have the appropriate training or skills to effectively teach Deaf students. In addition, most Deaf schools are led by hearing people, except one Deaf school, The Northwest Haiti Christian Mission, which has two Deaf teachers.

=== Deaf schools in Haiti ===
Below is a table identifying known institutions that provide education for the Haitian Deaf community and their details.

School name	School Details
St. Vincent School for the Handicapped	Enrolls students with disabilities, including Deaf children; More than 100 deaf students; Elementary and secondary education
Institut Montfort pour Infants Sourds	Only enrolls Deaf and Deaf-blind students; More than 600 students; Nursery - secondary education; includes vocational training
Haitian Christian Center for the Deaf (HCCD)	Enrolls Deaf students only; More than 200 students
PAZAPA School at the Jacmel Center	Enrolls children with disabilities, including Deaf children; Kindergarten - vocational training
Northwest Haiti Christian Mission	Employs Two Deaf Haitian teachers; Enrolls only Deaf students; Better described as a Deaf classroom; only 10 Deaf students; Primary school
The Ferrier School for the Deaf	Enrolls only deaf students; Primary School; Approximately 40 Deaf students

== Employment ==
In Haiti, 75%-80% of the population has no formal employment, relying instead on small-scale subsistence farming as their source of income. Frequent natural disasters that cause severe destruction to Haiti's land make it difficult for people to supply themselves with food let alone supply others with food.

=== Barriers ===
The deaf community in Haiti has even more difficulty finding employment (and employment that would meet their needs). The greatest barrier for the Deaf community regarding employment is the societal stigmatization of deafness. In addition, the inaccessibility of information regarding employment and social networking, which are both integral components to obtaining a job, disadvantages the Deaf community. The lack of employment that is available for people with disabilities has resulted in high levels of poverty among the disabled community; approximately 98% of people with disabilities are living under the poverty level in Haiti. The Haitian government has established disability policies that protect people with disability's employment rights and their general rights. However, there is no administrative system established to enforce these policies.

=== Common jobs ===
Deaf Haitians most commonly find work in the informal sector, which includes jobs in the marketplace, selling items at stands, and some jobs at the Port-au-Prince International Airport. However, the Deaf community has difficulty finding work in the informal sector, because most of the jobs require social connections and there is a high chance of a language barrier.

=== Deaf institutions as employment opportunities ===
Deaf institutions and establishments are most suitable for hiring Deaf individuals, because there is no communication barrier, the stigmatization of deafness is most likely eliminated and Deaf people are most likely qualified for the jobs (linguistic, cultural, and advocacy skills relating to the Deaf community). However, most of these jobs are occupied by hearing people, some of whom are not adequately knowledgeable about Haitian Sign Language or the Deaf community.

There are two establishments in Haiti known to actively employ Deaf individuals, St. Vincent's brace shop and Institut Montfort's farm.

1. St. Vincet's brace shop hires recent Deaf graduates from the St. Vincent's School for the Handicapped to make leg braces.
2. The Institut Montfort's farm employs Deaf adults to work on the farm during harvest season.

== Healthcare ==
There is a lack of healthcare, audiological and medical services for the whole population of Haiti. However, the deaf and hard-of-hearing community faces more barriers when accessing and utilizing healthcare and medical services. For example, there are no interpreting services in most healthcare services in Haiti, which results in a language barrier that may impact diagnosis, health literacy, and treatment adherence. The lack of healthcare services combined with the stigmatization of the Deaf community has resulted in medical professionals discriminating against Deaf individuals and denying them medical treatment

=== Discrimination ===
Deaf Haitians are often denied service when attempting to utilize healthcare services, due to the stigmatization and cultural beliefs of deafness in Haiti. In addition, the laws established to protect the deaf and hard-of-hearing community in Haiti are not enforced Therefore, these cultural and social beliefs result in discrimination against Deaf people that are not addressed. Angela Nardolillo, the founder of Off-The-Grid Missions, reported helping a Deaf woman get medical treatment for a gunshot wound to her stomach. Upon arriving at the medical center, the medical professionals denied the Deaf woman treatment, despite her concerning the state, and urged the injured woman to go elsewhere for treatment.

=== Ministries ===
There are multiple ministries that focus on providing medical and healing services to the Deaf Haitian community of Haiti.

- Haitian Christian Center for the Deaf (HCCD)
- The Church of Nazarene
- Coram Deo
- Healing Hands for Haiti

== Language preservation and revitalization ==
Haitian Sign Language (HSL) is not listed on the Expanded Graded Intergenerational Disruption Scale. However, many factors would negatively influence the vitality score of HSL

- HSL is not legally recognized by the Haitian government but is socially accepted as the official sign language of the Haitian Deaf community
- HSL has little social value and prestige due to societal and cultural beliefs about deafness. The number of people that openly use HSL is also negatively impacted by the stigmatization, societal, and cultural beliefs about deafness and violence toward the Deaf community.
- HSL is at risk due to American Sign Language's (which is a more dominant/higher prestige sign language) high presence and influence on the Deaf Community of Haiti and HSL.
- HSL is at risk due to the prioritization of spoken language. As mentioned in the Language Deprivation section, the Deaf community of Haiti has more access to hearing aids (and other hearing devices) and oral education, than to sign language support, resources, and education.
- There is a lack of provision of sign language services, such as interpreters. Haiti does not have a sign language interpreting service.

=== Primary threats ===
Haitian Sign Language (HSL) is heavily impacted by American Sign Language (ASL), which is used by foreign aid programs to help the Haitian deaf community. Most Deaf schools and foreign aid programs teach ASL, which can diminish the need and presence of HSL. Furthermore, HSL is threatened by societal and cultural beliefs about deafness. These beliefs result in a lack of availability of HSL education, support, and resources and, overall, a lack of HSL use. These beliefs influence the accessibility of HSL to children as well. For example, many parents, upon discovering their child is Deaf, do not attempt to teach them to HSL or expose them to the Deaf community because of the stigmatization of deafness, which may threaten the survival of HSL. These Deaf children are, instead, exposed to oral education and hearing technology.
