= Intestinal infectious diseases =

Intestinal infectious diseases include a large number of infections of the bowels, including cholera, typhoid fever, paratyphoid fever, other types of salmonella infections, shigellosis, botulism, gastroenteritis, and amoebiasis among others.

Typhoid and paratyphoid resulted in 221,000 deaths in 2013 down from 259,000 deaths in 1990. Other diseases which result in diarrhea caused another 1.3 million additional deaths in 2013 down from 2.6 million deaths in 1990.
