= Lissel Severe =

Internet Personality

- Born: Lissel Severe; February 20, 1968 (age 58); Boule Aquin, Haiti
- Known for: health content

Lissel Severe is a Haitian-American internet personality and traditional health expert. He gained attention for sharing traditional wellness remedies and natural medicine content on social media.

== Early life ==
Severe was born on February 20, 1968, in Boule Aquin, Haiti, where he spent his early years. He attended Adventist High School before moving to Fort Myers, Florida. He credits his childhood in Haiti, watching his father rely on local herbs to support their community, as the inspiration to share traditional health remedies on the internet.

== Career ==
Severe began sharing health-related content online in 2020, focusing on traditional remedies and aiming to make natural medicine easier to understand. He also made several podcast appearances to share his knowledge and promote his work. He launched his herbal tea business in 2021. By May 2025, Severe had garnered over 1.9 million followers across several social media platforms including 1.5 million on TikTok. He is known for his stripped-down videos and often personalized content to address the concerns of his followers.
