= HIV/AIDS in Jamaica =

HIV/AIDS in Jamaica has a 1.5 percent prevalence of the adult population estimated to be HIV-positive. There has been no significant change over the last five years and therefore Jamaica appears to have stabilized its HIV/AIDS epidemic.

== Prevalence ==
In 2008, at least 9 percent of commercial sex workers and 20 to 30 percent of men who have sex with men (MSM) were estimated to be HIV-positive. Men and women aged 20 to 39 accounted for 54 percent of reported AIDS cases in Jamaica. First detected in 1982, HIV is present in all of Jamaica’s parishes. Kingston, St. Andrew, and St. James – the three most urbanized parishes – have the majority of cases, with St James being the highest overall. In 2008, UNAIDS estimated that 25,000 people in Jamaica are HIV-infected.

The primary contributors to the epidemic are sociocultural, behavioral, and economic factors that result in risky behaviors such as multiple sex partners, older men having sex with younger women, and early sexual debut. In 2004, 89 percent of males and 78 percent of females aged 15 to 24 had sex with a nonmarital or noncohabitating partner in the preceding 12 months (2006). Fifty-six percent of males and 16 percent of females had multiple sex partners in the preceding 12 months. Among patients attending sexually transmitted infection (STI) clinics in Kingston, St. Andrew, and St. James, HIV infection rates reached 5 percent.

In the general population, overall AIDS case rates among men continue to exceed the rates among women. Surveillance data, as presented by Dr. Peter Figueroa of Jamaica’s Ministry of Health (MOH) at the U.S. Government-sponsored sixth annual Caribbean U.S. Chiefs of Mission Conference on HIV/AIDS held in Jamaica in October 2007, indicated that adolescent females (10 to 19 years old) are 2.7 times more likely to be infected than same-age males.

Young women are particularly at risk because they find it difficult to negotiate whether and when to have sex and how to protect themselves from pregnancy and disease. For example, the “sugar daddy” phenomenon, in which young women and girls exchange sex with older men for material or financial gain, is common. Gender inequality, high levels of unemployment, persistent poverty, rising crime and violence, population mobility, and the growing commercial sex trade – including sex tourism – compound the country’s vulnerability to the HIV/AIDS epidemic.

=== Men who have sex with men (MSM) ===
Although Jamaica has a well-established national surveillance system, collecting accurate data about at-risk groups is challenging. Despite some progress in reducing stigma and discrimination (S&D), homosexual behavior continues to be illegal in Jamaica, and many MSM hide their sexual orientation and behavior, impeding accurate health surveys. Recent program estimates indicate that 20 to 30 percent of MSM are HIV-positive.

=== Sex workers ===
Jamaica has a large number of mobile sex workers, both Jamaican and from outside Jamaica, who are difficult to monitor. HIV infection rates among sex workers are much higher than they are in the general population. A 2006 study of female sex workers, showed an HIV prevalence of 9 percent in this group. An earlier study found a 20 percent prevalence rate among sex workers in the tourist areas of Montego Bay. The actual prevalence of HIV may be higher in these groups as data collection remains difficult and is limited by sampling methods.

Sex workers who were older, less educated, and used crack cocaine were more likely to be HIV-infected.

=== Orphans ===
In 2003, there were 5,125 children in Jamaica who had lost one or both parents to HIV/AIDS, and thousands more were estimated to have been made vulnerable by the disease. Poverty and neglect have led to a growing number of street and working children. There were 5,143 children in institutional care in 2003, including those in foster care.

=== Tuberculosis ===
Controlling new tuberculosis (TB) infections in Jamaica remains a challenge. The incidence rate is 3 per 100,000 people. The prevalence of HIV among Jamaican TB patients is 26 percent. This figure is similar to other developing countries. Jamaica has a higher mortality rate among those who are co-infected, so prompt diagnosis of HIV infection and early institution of active antiretroviral treatment (ART) are imperative.

== National Response ==
The Government of Jamaica has aggressively addressed the HIV/AIDS epidemic since 1988, when it established the National HIV/Sexually Transmitted Disease Prevention and Control Program and the National AIDS Committee (NAC), a nongovernmental organization (NGO). The Program, working under the MOH, facilitates governmental cooperation with the private sector and NGOs in the fight against HIV/AIDS. NAC, which has more than 100 member organizations, coordinates the national response to the epidemic.

During the past two decades, Jamaica has taken several steps to combat HIV/AIDS. More recent efforts include joining the Pan Caribbean Partnership Against HIV/AIDS upon its formation in 2001 and continuing to serve as an active member; developing an HIV/AIDS prevention and control project; implementing two national strategic plans on HIV/AIDS and STIs, the most recent of which ended in 2006, and launching a new plan in 2007; providing ART for persons with advanced HIV and HIV-infected mothers since 2004; adopting a national HIV/AIDS policy in 2005; and establishing a private sector-led business coalition on HIV in 2006.

From 2007 to 2011, the government implemented its third National Strategic Plan on HIV/AIDS/STIs. The Plan focused on achieving universal access to prevention, treatment, and care and support. In 2008, only 56 percent of HIV-infected people who needed treatment receive ART. In July 2007, the World Bank announced that it would work with Jamaica to design a second HIV/AIDS prevention and control project to be implemented after the current project closes in May 2008.

In 2004, Jamaica’s MOH received a third-round grant from the Global Fund to Fight AIDS, Tuberculosis and Malaria to strengthen multisectoral national activities to prevent and address the HIV/AIDS epidemic. This has been done through scaling up efforts to:

- Provide ART to children and adults living with HIV/AIDS
- Promote safer sex practices, including abstinence, especially among subpopulations and marginalized groups who tend to be the most vulnerable
- Complete and implement policies and a legislative framework specifically addressing S&D aimed at people living with HIV/AIDS and vulnerable high-risk groups

Jamaica has applied to the Global Fund for a 2007 $44.2 million grant to consolidate existing gains while scaling up efforts to provide universal access to HIV treatment, care, and prevention, with special emphasis on vulnerable populations. Jamaica had already received $16.4 million from the Global Fund during round three for HIV/AIDS treatment, prevention, and policy efforts.

== See also ==
- HIV/AIDS in North America
