= HIV/AIDS in South America =

In 2025, there were an estimated 41 million people worldwide infected with HIV. HIV/AIDS prevalence rates in South America vary from 1.6% in Suriname to 0.4% in Argentina.

== Prevalence per country ==
=== HIV/AIDS in Argentina ===
In 2025, the adult prevalence rate in Argentina was estimated to be 0.4%.

=== HIV/AIDS in Bolivia ===
In 2025, the adult prevalence rate was estimated to be 0.4%.

=== HIV/AIDS in Brazil ===
In 2024, the adult prevalence rate was estimated to be 0.7%.

=== HIV/AIDS in Chile ===
In 2024, the adult prevalence rate in Chile was estimated to be 0.7%.

=== HIV/AIDS in Colombia ===
In 2024, the adult prevalence rate was estimated to be 0.6%.

=== HIV/AIDS in Ecuador ===
In 2024, the adult prevalence rate in Ecuador was estimated to be 0.4%.

=== HIV/AIDS in French Guiana ===
In 2024, French Guyana was estimated to have a prevalence rate of HIV in treatment of 14.3%.

=== HIV/AIDS in Guyana ===
In 2024, the adult prevalence rate in Guyana was estimated to be 1.6%.

=== HIV/AIDS in Paraguay ===
In 2024, the adult prevalence rate was estimated to be 0.5%.

=== HIV/AIDS in Peru ===
In 2024, the adult prevalence rate was estimated to be 0.4%.

=== HIV/AIDS in Suriname ===
In 2024, the adult prevalence rate was estimated to be 1.6%.

=== HIV/AIDS in Uruguay ===
In 2025, the prevalence in the general population was estimated to be 0.6%.

=== HIV/AIDS in Venezuela ===
In 2024, the adult prevalence rate was estimated to be 0.6%.

== See also ==
- HIV/AIDS in Africa
- HIV/AIDS in Asia
- HIV/AIDS in Europe
- HIV/AIDS in North America
- List of countries by HIV/AIDS adult prevalence rate
