= HIV/AIDS in Indonesia =

HIV epidemic in Indonesia

UNAIDS has said that HIV/AIDS in Indonesia is one of Asia's fastest growing epidemics. In 2010, it is expected that 5 million Indonesians will have HIV/AIDS. In 2007, Indonesia was ranked 99th in the world by prevalence rate, but because of low understanding of the symptoms of the disease and high social stigma attached to it, only 5-10% of HIV/AIDS sufferers actually get diagnosed and treated. According to the a estimation conducted in 2019, it is counted that 640,443 people in the country are living with HIV. The adult prevalence for HIV/ AIDS in the country is 0.4%. Indonesia is the country in Southeast Asia to have the most number of recorded people living with HIV while Thailand has the highest adult prevalence.

== History ==
Indonesia's first case of HIV was reported in 1987 and between then and 2009, 3,492 people died from the disease. Of the 11,856 cases reported in 2008, 6,962 of them were people under 30 years of age, including 55 infants under 1 year old. There were a high number of concentrated cases among Indonesia's most at risk including injection drug users (IDUs), sex workers their partners and clients, homosexual men and infants who contract the disease through the womb or from being breast fed.

Over the past two decades the spread of HIV/AIDS has grown into a generalised epidemic in Indonesia. The number of AIDS-related deaths among people aged above 15 years was anticipated to be as high as 40,000 people a year in 2015. UNAIDS has also estimated there were 110,000 orphans due to AIDS aged 0 to 17 in 2015.

According to 2016 data from the Ministry of Health, risky heterosexual sex is attributed to 47% of new HIV infections, MSM accounted for 25% and the cohort 'under 4 years old' accounted for 2%. When these three are combined it equals almost 75% of all new HIV infections.

Historically the highest concentration areas have been Papua, Jakarta, East Java, West Java, Bali and Riau. The island of Java, which includes the capital Jakarta, is now home to the highest concentration of HIV cases in Indonesia. Of the 34 provinces spread across the vast territories of Indonesia, two provinces represent more than a quarter (28%) of the national total of people living with HIV – DKI Jakarta and Papua.

A generalised epidemic was already under way in the provinces of Papua and West Papua, where a population-based survey found an adult-prevalence rate of 2.4% in 2006. When surveyed, 48% of Papuans were unaware of HIV/AIDS, and the number of AIDS cases per 100,000 people in the two provinces was almost 20 times the national average. The percentage of people who reported being unaware of HIV/AIDS increases to 74% among uneducated populations in the region.

The epidemic in Indonesia is one of the fastest growing among HIV/AIDS in Asia. In 2006 it was considered that injecting drug use was the primary mode of transmission, not heterosexual sex. Injecting drug users accounted for 59% of HIV infections, and heterosexual transmission accounted for 41%. According to the Indonesian Ministry of Health, surveys reported that more than 40% of injecting drug users in Jakarta tested positive for HIV, and about 13% tested positive in West Java. In 2005, 25% of IDUs in Bandung, Jakarta, and Medan said they had unprotected paid sex in the last 12 months.

The speed of growth in HIV infections in Indonesia is clear from the data presented in the Indonesian Ministry of Health's 'Documentation of Preliminary Modeling Update Work Undertaken to Provide Input into the Investment Case Analysis and National HIV Strategic and Action Plan 2015–2019'. This shows there were an estimated 697,000 people living with HIV in Indonesia in 2016. This is projected to increase by 11.6% to almost 778,000 in 2019. This increase is far above the anticipated natural population growth rate of 3.6% over the same period (World Bank 2016).

This modelling also highlights that the largest key population when measured by total projected new infections, and by the total number living with HIV, is low risk women. HIV-positive men aged over 15 years (420,000) outnumber women in the same age cohort (247,000) at a ratio of almost 2 to 1 according to PEPFAR (2016).

According to the National AIDS Commission of Indonesia "the annual number of new ART initiators continues to fall short of the estimated annual number of new HIV infections, and insufficient treatment retention rates limits both the prevention and mortality impact of resources being spent on HIV treatment. The strategies being employed to contain HIV in Indonesia are by and large appropriate given the stage of the HIV epidemic, but have not been realizing their full impact due to insufficient scale and program implementation issues".

== Challenges of addressing HIV/AIDS in Indonesia ==
Indonesia has a mix of legal and governance arrangements spanning from central national government down to smaller local administrative districts and municipalities. The Aceh part of Indonesia live under local Shari'a laws.

There has been a national commitment to reduce HIV for many years. In 2011 former President Susilo Bambang Yudhoyono committed to the UNAIDS 'Getting to Zero' goals (UNAIDS 2011) which included a commitment to halt the spread of new infections by 2015 through scaling up treatment services. Despite these commitments Indonesia has failed to achieve the improvements the government signed up to. There are many possible reasons including the decentralised system of government in Indonesia, leaving the ultimate implementation of any strategy or guideline to lower-tiers of government like local and district governments.

A failure to properly invest in healthcare and HIV treatments has meant HIV has continued to spread and to kill Indonesians of all ages. The National HIV and AIDS Strategy and Action Plan 2010-2014 included commitments to 'achieve coverage of 80% of key affected populations with effective programs, with 60% of them engaging in safe behavior, and for 70% of funding for the target response coming from domestic sources.'

Yet the reality is far different. With respect to reaching key populations with effective programs, and engaging them with safe behaviour, according to PEPFAR (2016) these goals also were not met. A 2013 social marketing campaign to increase condom usage for HIV prevention by the then Minister for Health failed to shift condom usage rates among key populations, with condom usage actually declining among people who inject drugs (PEPFAR 2016).

HIV antiretroviral therapy coverage is woefully low despite clear scientific evidence supporting immediate provision of Antiretroviral Therapy to a person who is newly diagnosed with HIV irrespective of their CD4 count. It is estimated that 57,194 people of the almost 800,000 people living with HIV, or 7%, will be on ART by 2019. According to the UNAIDS GAP Report in 2014, only 8% national ART coverage had been achieved at the time of writing the report. Since 2011 new infections among key populations have increased or remained largely unchanged in raw numbers.

In addition to the lack of provision of ART, according to PEPFAR (2016), "viral load testing is still currently not widely available in country and CD4 testing is not always conducted regularly among those currently on ART". This makes it very difficult to monitor the effectiveness of ART drugs among the HIV-positive population who have been prescribed the HIV drugs. As a result this lack of system infrastructure severely inhibits the use of viral suppression (when a HIV-positive person achieves an 'undetectable' viral amount and theoretically cannot transmit the virus on) as a prevention tool in Indonesia.

The National AIDS Commission of Indonesia noted in 2015 the need for increased investment into HIV prevention with epidemiological modelling showing Indonesia would not achieve zero new infections and zero HIV-related deaths by 2030. It is a UNAIDS goal and broadly a United Nations Goal, of which Indonesia is a member, to achieve these 'zero' targets for HIV by 2030.

The investment in proper healthcare is not limited to HIV. According to the Australian Department of Foreign Affairs and Trade (2016), "Indonesia spends the least in the region on health as a percentage of GDP and has some of the lowest health indicators". It was recently ranked 91 out of 188 countries in a study measuring the Global Burden of Disease, published in The Lancet (2016). However a new healthcare insurance scheme is being rolled out with a provisional finalisation date of 2019.

Condom use is low according to the Indonesian Ministry of Health's Integrated Behaviour Biological Surveillance among 'high risk groups' (not including low-risk women who are expected to be the largest cohort for new infections during 2016–2019), with 61% of female sex workers using a condom during their 'last commercial sex encounter'. Less than half reported consistent condom use. Injecting drug users and men who have sex with men also had usage rates below 60%. Transgender sex workers (waria) achieved 80% condom usage.

With respect to the funding target a recent statement by the Ministry of Health of Indonesia in June 2016 would suggest the target wasn't met or sustained: 'Indonesia currently is funding almost 60% of total HIV treatment needs, and determined to increase it in the future'. The remainder of the current funding comes from foreign aid and NGOs according to PEPFAR. This is despite Indonesia being a middle income nation (World Bank 2016)

There are also socio-cultural and legal barriers to preventing the transmission of HIV in Indonesia as outlined in the National Consultation on Legal and Policy Barriers to HIV in Indonesia 2015. Sex work is criminal, and a condom is admissible in a court as proof a sexual transaction between two people, providing a major disincentive to using a condom during this type of sexual encounter. Some leaders have attempted to shut down the sex work which may prove to be impossible industry.

Broadly there is a lack of accurate health knowledge about HIV/AIDS, how it is spread and how to treat it. In 2015 the Jakarta Globe reported that an Indonesian Government Minister claimed used clothes 'transmit HIV', showing even at the highest levels of leadership in Indonesia there remains a very poor understanding about HIV/AIDS.

Historically the awareness of HIV status among at-risk populations has been low. According to a 2004–2005 study cited in the UNGASS report, 18.1% of IDUs, 15.4% of MSM, 14.8% of sex workers, and 3.3% of clients of sex workers had received HIV testing in the previous 12 months and knew their test results. Stigma and discrimination persist and many people living with HIV hide their status for fear of losing their jobs, social status, and the support of their families and communities, thus decreasing the likelihood that they will receive proper treatment and increasing the chances of HIV spreading undetected.

A major factor in this lack of knowledge could be due to the fact sexual education is not part of the school curriculum in Indonesia (Yosephine 2016). A New York Times article in 2013 (Schonhardt 2013), at the time of the Indonesian Health Minister's inaugural condom awareness campaign, noted the Minister (also a respected medical doctor) "stepped back from her support for sex education after her campaign to promote condom use among groups at risk of contracting HIV provoked a public backlash last year". It continues, "in Indonesia, many conservative officials feel that sexual topics are too sensitive to be discussed publicly and oppose mandatory sex education... Groups like the Indonesian Council of Ulema are also influential in the majority-Muslim country."

== National response ==
Indonesia established a National AIDS Commission in 1994 to focus on preventing the spread of HIV, addressing the needs of people living with HIV/AIDS, and coordinating government, nongovernmental organizations (NGOs), private sector, and community activities. The Government of Indonesia signified its continued commitment to fighting HIV/AIDS in 2005 when it budgeted $13 million to HIV/AIDS programs, an increase of 40 percent over the amount disbursed in 2004. However, the national budget for HIV/AIDS has since been stagnant. A 2006 Presidential Regulation reinforced the Commission's position as the National AIDS Strategy for 2003–2007 stressed the role of prevention as the core of Indonesia's HIV/AIDS program, while recognizing the urgent need to scale up treatment, care, and support services. The strategy emphasized the importance of conducting proper HIV/AIDS and sexually transmitted infection (STI) surveillance; carrying out operational research; creating an enabling environment through legislation, advocacy, capacity building, and antidiscrimination efforts; and promoting sustainability. Building upon this framework, the National AIDS Strategy for 2007–2010 added the priority targets of reaching 80 percent of people most-at-risk with comprehensive prevention programs; influencing 60 percent of the most-at-risk population to change their behaviors; and providing antiretroviral therapy (ART) to 80 percent of those in need.

The Government of Indonesia initiated a program to subsidise the cost of ART in 2004. By 2005, the program provided low-cost ART at 50 hospitals. However, only 20 percent of HIV-infected people received ART in 2006, according to UNAIDS, and for every one person who starts ART another six get infected. Treatment adherence continues to be a challenge in Indonesia as more often than not, people living with HIV drop out of antiretroviral therapy due to many complex factors. Other competing demands on the government such as dealing with natural disasters and other health emergencies such as avian influenza also pose challenges to sustaining the momentum of the AIDS response.

Indonesia's local governments have investigated innovative techniques to slow down the spread of the disease, including using microchip tagging technology to keep track of the infected individuals known to be sexually active.

== International help ==
Indonesia receives assistance from several international donor organizations, including the Global Fund to Fight AIDS, Tuberculosis and Malaria. The Global Fund approved a fourth-round grant in 2005 for Indonesia to provide comprehensive care for HIV/AIDS-infected and -affected individuals.

In 2007 Australia donated A$100 million to help contain the epidemic in Indonesia. The aim of the program is to limit the number of people who contract the disease through education of at risk groups, improve the quality of life for suffers, and reduce the socioeconomic effects on Indonesia. Australia has been assisting Indonesia to tackle HIV/AIDS for over 15 years and introduced the first methadone program to a prison in Asia, the program is now in 95 prisons across Indonesia.

America also supports Indonesia's National Aids Program, donating US$8 million annually. The program aims to increase awareness of the risks and prevention methods and will work closely with NGO's and provincial governments to develop services in areas where the spread is now considered to be an epidemic.
