= HIV/AIDS in Latin America =

HIV/AIDS has been a public health concern for Latin America due to a remaining prevalence of the disease. As of 2024, approximately 2.5 million people in Latin America were living with HIV. This is an increase from the 2018 estimation that 2.2 million people had HIV in Latin America and the Caribbean, making the HIV prevalence rate approximately 0.4% in Latin America. In 2024, there were approximately 120,000 new HIV infections in Latin America, nearly all of which were among adults aged 15 and older. That same year, the region experienced 27,000 AIDS-related deaths. Overall, approximately 71% of all people living with HIV in Latin America are on an antiretroviral treatment (ART), though this regional treatment coverage percentage is lower for children (age 0-14) and pregnant women.

Some demographic groups in Latin America have higher prevalence rates for HIV/ AIDS including men who have sex with men having a prevalence rate of 10.6%, and transgender women having one of the highest rates within the population with a prevalence rate of 17.7%. Female sex workers and drug users also have higher prevalence for the disease than the general population (4.9% and 1%-49.7% respectively).

== Prevalence ==
The 2001 prevalence rate of HIV/AIDS in Latin America was highest in Belize (2%), Honduras (1.9%), Panama (1.54%) and Guatemala (1.4%). Since 2000, the prevalence of HIV/AIDS in the Caribbean has been highest in Haiti (5.2%), the Bahamas (4.1%), and the Dominican Republic (2.8%).

One aspect that has contributed to the higher prevalence of HIV/AIDS in LGBT+ groups in Latin America is the concept of homophobia. Homophobia in Latin America has historically affected HIV service provision through under reported data and less priority through government programs.

Antiretroviral treatment coverage has been high, with AIDS related deaths decreasing between 2007 and 2017 by 12%, although the rate of new infections has not seen a large decrease. The cost of antiretroviral medicines remain a barrier for some in Latin America, as well as country wide shortages of medicines and condoms. In 2017 77% of Latin Americans with HIV were aware of their HIV status.

The prevention of HIV/AIDS in Latin America among groups with a higher prevalence, such as men who have sex with men and transgender women, has been aided with educational outreach, condom distribution, and LGBT+ friendly clinics. Other main prevention methods include condom availability, education and outreach, HIV awareness, and mother-to-child transmission prevention.

== History ==
The first documented reporting of what would come to be known as HIV/AIDS happened in June 1981. In September 1982, AIDS is given its name and a case definition for the very first time. Specific details on the origin of HIV/AIDS in Latin America are lacking, but in 1983, the first known HIV cases in Latin America were confirmed in Mexico and Haiti in the form of the HIV-1. Blood screening in Mexico was scarce in the early 1990s, which contributed to 63% of female AIDS cases stemming from blood transfusions.

== Prevention of HIV/AIDS infections ==
In order to prevent and slow the transmission rates within the Latin American population public health initiatives need to target vulnerable populations. Providing treatment, education, and health services that are stigma-free and accessible to vulnerable populations is key to combating the prevalence of HIV/AIDS in Latin America. Another common barrier in accessing health services among transgender women is a mistrust of the health system as a whole from past discrimination towards this community within the health system.

=== Prevention practices and methods ===
To prevent transmission between individuals, safe sex practices and treatment using antiretroviral treatment is a necessary public health intervention. Within Latin America as of 2018, 62% of those that are aware of their positive HIV status are currently on antiretroviral therapy, and of those individuals only 55% of them are virally suppressed, and carry an undetectable load. This accounts for 29% of the entire HIV positive community in Latin America.

Practices to prevent transmission of HIV/AIDS

- Engaging in less risky sexual behavior
- Correctly using barrier methods (male condoms and dental damns)
- Getting tested for HIV/AIDS and getting treated with antiretroviral therapy
- Taking preventative medicines for high risk populations, like post-exposure prophylaxis (PEP) and pre-exposure prophylaxis (PrEP)
- Not using or injecting drugs

These safe sex practices reduce the risk of contracting HIV/AIDS. Many of these treatments are not widely available and accessible to vulnerable populations within Latin America. In order to successfully implement these prevention methods the stigma and discrimination surrounding vulnerable populations needs to be addressed within the present health systems in Latin America.

=== Public health initiatives ===
Within Latin America there are many barriers to prevention methods, including late diagnostic testing of patients, lack of testing centers in rural communities, and the stigma/discrimination within the HIV positive population. In 2009, the Elimination Initiative was launched in partnership with UNICEF, the Pan American Health Organization, the Latin American Center for Perinatology (CLAP) and other organizations. It aimed to integrate the services of prevention and diagnosis of both HIV and syphilis within the framework of primary care services, prenatal, sexual, reproductive and family health.

Recently in Bahamas, Brazil, El Salvador, Jamaica, Peru, and Trinidad and Tobago self tests were made available, and have the potential to increase testing in at-risk populations. However the accessibility and affordability of the tests is under scrutiny from public health professionals. Other public health initiatives include education regarding safe sex practice use and condom availability. Programs in Mexico and Brazil that aimed to prevent mother-to-child transmission (PMTCT) is an important initiative that has been relatively successful at reducing the prevalence of HIV/AIDS in this population from 16.7% in 2010 to 10.4% in 2017.

== See also ==
- HIV/AIDS in North America
- HIV/AIDS in South America
- HIV/AIDS in the Caribbean
- AIDS pandemic
- HIV/AIDS in Argentina
- HIV/AIDS in Brazil
