= Roberto Jáuregui =

Argentine actor, activist, journalist

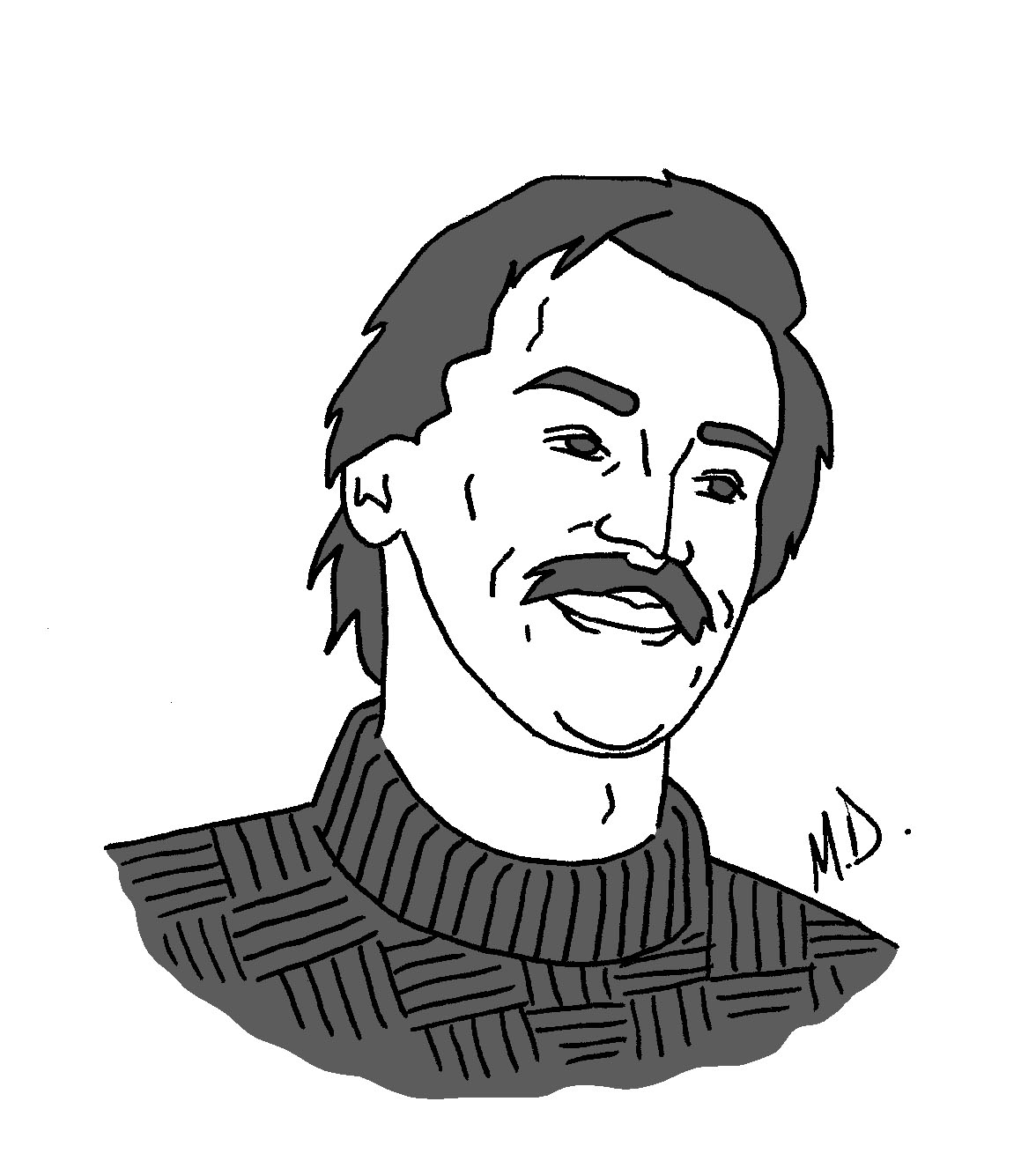
- Born: August 12, 1960; La Plata, Argentina
- Died: January 13, 1994 (33 years old); Buenos Aires, Argentina
- Cause of death: Complications of AIDS
- Other names: Roby
- Occupations: Journalist, writer, human rights activist
- Relatives: Carlos Jáuregui

Roberto Jáuregui was an Argentine journalist, actor, and human rights activist. Jáuregui was among the first people to contract HIV in Argentina, and the first to publicly disclose his condition. He was also the first General Coordinator of the Fundación Huésped, an Argentine public health organization which has prioritized HIV/AIDS awareness and treatment. His brother, Carlos Jáuregui, was also an activist for LGBT rights and related issues.

== Notable events ==
In 1989, Jáuregui had contracted HIV, but did not have the money to pay for treatment. He publicly denounced the inequality of access to healthcare which he believed existed in Argentina at the time, bringing him into the public eye as an activist for public health and HIV/AIDS treatment.

He appeared on the television show Hora Clave in 1993, where reporter Mariano Grondona asked Jáuregui to give him a hug, publicly debunking the misconception that physical touch alone can transmit HIV. During the program, when asked by a doctor about whether he was afraid of death, he replied "¿Y usted, doctor, no le tiene miedo a la muerte?" ("And you, doctor, are you not afraid of death?")

Jáuregui also appeared on the telenovela Celeste to speak about living with HIV. This appearance was a result of UNICEF's strategy of using soap operas to educate about health issues.

On January 13, 1994, Jáuregui died of AIDS complications.

== See also ==
- Carlos Jáuregui (activist)
- HIV/AIDS in Argentina
