= Carlos Jáuregui (activist) =

Argentine LGBT rights activist

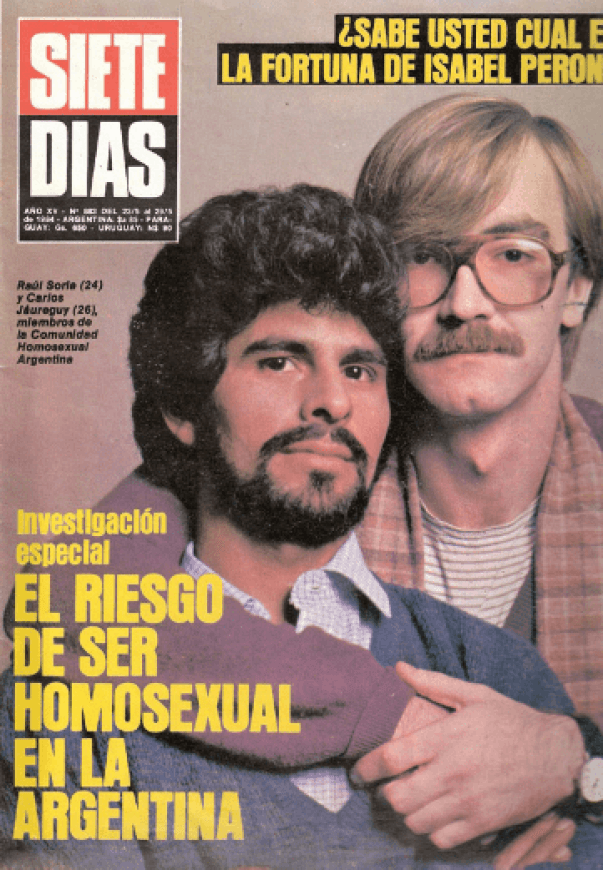
- Jauregui (right) in 1984
- Born: 22 September 1957; La Plata, Buenos Aires, Argentina
- Died: 20 August 1996 (aged 38); Buenos Aires, Argentina
- Occupations: Activist; author
- Known for: La Comunidad Homosexual Argentina (CHA), Gays por los Derechos Civiles (Gays DC)
- Political party: Front of Advanced Democracy
- Relatives: Roberto Jáuregui

Carlos Jáuregui (22 September 1957 – 20 August 1996) was an Argentine LGBT rights activist. He founded La Comunidad Homosexual Argentina (CHA, or the Argentine Homosexual Community) in 1984. In the early 1990s, he set up Gays por los Derechos Civiles (Gays DC, or Gays for Civil Rights) and organised the first Pride march in Buenos Aires. He died from an HIV-AIDS-related illness at the age of 38. In memorial, a national day of activism for sexual diversity was established. He was posthumously given the Felipa de Souza Award, and, in 2017, a station was renamed after him on the Buenos Aires Underground.

== Early life ==
Carlos Jáuregui was born in La Plata on 22 September 1957. After attending university, he studied as a postgraduate in Paris and then lived in New York City. When he returned to Argentina in 1982, he was not yet an activist. The National Reorganization Process, the military dictatorship that had ruled Argentina since 1976, collapsed in 1983 and the following year Jáuregui founded La Comunidad Homosexual Argentina (CHA, or the Argentine Homosexual Community).

== Career ==
CHA became an important group campaigning for gay rights in Argentina and is internationally recognised as a force in creating the strong LGBT rights in Argentina. By the end of the 1990s it was giving legal assistance, remembering AIDS deaths and campaigning for HIV/AIDS awareness and against LGBT discrimination. Jáuregui published La homosexualidad en la Argentina (Homosexuality and Argentina) in 1987. It recounted his experiences as an activist in Argentina and the foundation of CHA. Jáuregui then set up Gays por los Derechos Civiles (Gays DC, or Gays for Civil Rights) in 1991, which later became Gays and Lesbians for Civil Rights. Its most active years were 1993 until 1996, with the group focusing upon supporting victims of discrimination based on sexuality and sufferers of AIDS. Jáuregui became a media figure, performing stunts such as suing Antonio Quarracino (the Archbishop of Buenos Aires) for discrimination. Unlike other gay leaders at the time, he always insisted upon the four "legs" of the "table", namely gay, lesbian, transsexual, and travesti, saying that if any leg was missing the whole table would collapse. In 1992, Jáuregui organised the Primera Marcha del Orgullo Gay Lésbica Travesti Trans Bisexual, the first LGBT Pride march in Buenos Aires. The first march drew 300 people; by the late 2010s it was drawing over 100,000 people.

== Death and legacy ==
Carlos Jáuregui died at the age of 38 as a result of an HIV-AIDS-related illness on 20 August 1996. His partner Pablo Azcona and his brother Roberto Jáuregui had each previously died from AIDS related illnesses, in 1988 and 1994 respectively. Soon after his death, the Buenos Aires City Legislature voted to add a clause that punishes acts of sexual discrimination to the city's constitution.

A square was named after him in Buenos Aires, and an annual day of activism for sexual diversity (el Día del Activismo por la diversidad sexual) was launched. In 1998, he was posthumously given the Felipa de Souza Award. A Buenos Aires Underground station was named after him in 2017; Santa Fe – Carlos Jáuregui station was opened by Horacio Rodríguez Larreta, chief of local government, and featured rainbow-coloured steps and a large mural. The Independent claimed it was the first station in the world to be named after an LGBT activist.

Mabel Bellucci wrote Orgullo – Carlos Jáuregui, una biografía política (Pride – Carlos Jáuregui, a political biography), which was published in 2010. A film about Jáuregui's life was made in 2016, titled Carlos Jáuregui: The Unforgettable Fag.
