= HIV/AIDS in Peru =

Cases of HIV/AIDS in Peru are considered to have reached the level of a concentrated epidemic.

== Prevalence ==
In a population-based survey conducted in Peru’s 24 largest cities in 2002, adult HIV prevalence was estimated to be less than 1 percent. It was 0.6 percent among pregnant women; 0.4 percent among males; and 0.1 percent among females. The survey demonstrated that cases are unevenly distributed in Peru, affecting mostly young people between the ages of 25 and 34.

As of July 2010, the cumulative reported number of persons infected with HIV was 41,638. There were 26,566 cases of AIDS, according to the Ministry of Health (MOH). The male/female ratio for AIDS diagnoses in 2009 was 3.02 to 1. The Joint United Nations Program on HIV/AIDS (UNAIDS) estimates 76,000 Peruvians are HIV-positive, meaning that many people at risk do not know their status. There were 3,300 deaths due to AIDS in Peru in 2007 (UNAIDS, 2008), down from 5,600 deaths in 2005.

In 2010, 77 percent of all reported cases were in Lima and Callao – the capital city area.

== Transmission ==
Sexual transmission accounts for the majority (97 percent) of cases, followed by mother-to-child transmission (2 percent), and contaminated blood and blood products (1 percent) (UNGASS, 2010). The prevalence among men who have sex with men (MSM), which was 14 percent nationally and 23 percent in Lima in 2005, has continued to rise in recent years, while among prostitutes prevalence remains low (0.6 to 2 percent).

In five Central American countries, the annual HIV incidence was 5.1% among men who have sex with men, while an incidence of 3.5% has been found among men who have sex with men who attended public health clinics in Lima, Peru. A 2009 analysis by Alarcon-Villaverde indicated MSM account for a large proportion of HIV incidence (55 percent) in Peru (UNAIDS, 2009). Transsexual prostitutes are the most affected population, with an estimated prevalence between 32 percent and 45 percent (UNGASS, 2010).

Although 96 percent of female prostitutes report having used a condom with their last client (MOH, 2003), the frequency of condom use among male prostitutes is only 42 percent (UNGASS 2008). HIV/AIDS incidence in the main prisons in Peru is approximately 1.1 percent (Instituto Nacional Penitenciario [INPE], 2005), and condom use by prison inmates is low (32.8 percent reported in 2004) (INPE, 2005).

Blood safety is a concern. Several reported cases of HIV infection in 2006 and 2007 have been attributed to blood transfusions received through public health services (MOH, 2007).

Infections with syphilis, gonorrhea, and Chlamydia in men and women and trichomoniasis and bacterial vaginosis in women are factors in the increasing risk of HIV transmission in Peru. In the 2009 Demographic and Health Survey, 14 percent of the women surveyed among those reporting history of sexual intercourse reported having sexually transmitted infection (STI) symptoms. Inadequate and ineffective treatment of sexually transmitted infections (STIs) is common in Peru. Of significant concern is the high HIV prevalence among prison inmates.

Given the relatively low level of sexual education, limited condom use, and risky sexual behaviors practiced by some subpopulations, including multiple sex partners, there is a significant potential for the further spread of HIV in Peru. In the 2008 UNGASS report, less than 5 percent of schools offer sex education, including information about HIV (USAID 2010). A 2002 study of young people aged 18 to 30 in 34 neighborhoods in Lima, Chiclayo, and Trujillo, demonstrated that 18 percent had more than one sex partner in the last year, while 8 percent had more than one partner in the last three months, and condom use was low.

== National response ==
Peru was one of the first countries in Latin America to adopt a syndromic management approach to STIs and offer prophylaxis for preventing mother-to-child HIV transmission, although currently PMTCT coverage is only 56 percent, according to the 2010 UNGASS report. Peru's strategy to prevent STIs was called a model for the Andean region, and in 2000, UNAIDS cited Peru's HIV/AIDS prevention program as one of the best in the world. Soon after, however, political turmoil, an economic crisis, and repeated changes in key personnel combined to undermine MOH operations, including the STI program.

In a major restructuring of the MOH in 2002 and 2003, several vertical programs, including the National AIDS Program (NAP), were merged. This was accompanied by a reduction in funding and management capacity for AIDS, tuberculosis (TB), child immunization, and other programs. All aspects of the NAP suffered. In 2004, the MOH began reconstituting its HIV/AIDS program, with the goals of limiting the expansion of the epidemic by preventing new infections and providing appropriate and effective care and support to those who have HIV/AIDS.

In 2007, a new Strategic Multisectoral Plan for the Prevention and Control of STI/HIV/AIDS for 2007–2011 was designed based on evidence-based strategies. Most-at-risk populations (MARPs) were included as one of the most important target populations. The Plan proposed nine strategic objectives, including prevention, care, and policy issues. One strategic objective was the reduction of HIV and STIs among MSM, FSW, and prison inmates.

The Plan proposed the following activities: promotion and distribution of condoms, advocacy for promotion and access to services, improvement of STI/HIV services, STI/HIV facilities, treatment of STIs, strengthening the peer-educator strategy, and strengthening community-based organizations of MSM and FSW. Since the plan was designed to guide HIV/STI activities for 2007–2011, Global Fund to Fight AIDS, Tuberculosis and Malaria projects in Peru (especially the sixth round) used it as a framework for their activities.

Public health services are the main source of care for HIV/AIDS and STIs in Peru, most of which are delivered by the MOH, regional health authorities, and the social security system. In coordination with the MOH, other state sectors, such as the Ministry of Education and the Ministry for Women and Social Development, have programs directed at educating and protecting adolescents and children and preventing HIV/AIDS by promoting healthy lifestyles and reducing high-risk behaviors. Education efforts for HIV prevention in schools are being implemented as part of activities financed by the Global Fund to Fight AIDS, Tuberculosis and Malaria and the United States Agency for International Development (USAID).

Peruvians living with HIV/AIDS are protected by Law 26626, enacted in 1996, which recognizes fundamental rights of autonomy, confidentiality, and nondiscrimination and guarantees provision of medical treatment according to the state's capacity. HIV testing for pregnant women is mandatory where there is a risk (although this is criticized by human rights observers), and the state is required to provide integral care (including treatment) to all people living with HIV/AIDS (PLWHA). According to the WHO/UNAIDS/UNICEF Towards Universal Access report, only 48 percent of HIV-infected people in need of antiretroviral therapy (ART) were receiving it in 2007.

The activities supported by the Global Fund represent a large proportion of the investment in HIV/AIDS in the country, though the Government of Peru is funding most of the costs of procuring antiretroviral drugs. Peru has obtained funding for HIV/AIDS activities through the Global Fund's rounds two, five, and six. The initial activities emphasized the provision of highly active antiretroviral therapy (ART), but later projects emphasized prevention. Peru directs more than 5% of its HIV prevention spending toward prevention programmes for men who have sex with men. An opportunity in these prevention efforts is to target HIV positive individuals through internet communication and cell phone messages to support intervention delivery for HIV treatment adherence and prevention of secondary HIV transmission.

The Country Coordinating Mechanism (CCM), established for coordinating activities supported by the Global Fund, is the only multisectoral coordinating mechanism in the country. Under the CCM, governmental ministries, organizations of PLWHA and those affected by TB, nongovernmental organizations, faith-based groups, academia, and international organizations oversee and coordinate Peru's response to the epidemic. The CCM steered the development of the Strategic Multisectoral Plan for the Prevention and Control of STI/HIV/AIDS for 2007–2011.

There are currently four national organizations of people living with HIV/AIDS in Peru. The group with the largest reported impact of 1,000 people is the Asociación Solas y Unidas, which was founded in 1999. Their principal activities include sexual and reproductive health training, gender and leadership for women living with HIV/AIDS, professional training and career support for impoverished women living with HIV/AIDS, education and training for children affected by HIV/AIDS, and nutritional support for low-income families affected by HIV/AIDS (Directory of Associations of People Living with HIV/AIDS, USAID 2004).

Also working with these populations are the Alianza en Accion +, Coordinadora Peruana de Personas Viviendo con VIH/SIDA, and GAM Renacer. Overall, the populations these organizations work with have limited access to anti-retroviral therapies, psychosocial support, home-based services, while there is more access to nutritional guidance and TB screening and treatment through the national Ministry of Health health centers.

== USAID Support ==
Through USAID, Peru received $1.2 million in fiscal year (FY) 2009 for essential HIV/AIDS programs and services. USAID's HIV/AIDS programs in Peru are implemented as part of the U.S. President's Emergency Plan. Thanks to this support, Peru's health indicators-such as life expectancy, fertility rate, and infant and maternal death rates- have improved steadily over the past several decades. However, troubling differences exist, particularly between rural and urban populations, made worse by poverty and low education levels. There are significant challenges associated with enacting successful prevention efforts in Peru, in particular in the rural regions where there is limited access and where some communities do not even have a word for ‘prevention’.

== See also ==
- HIV/AIDS in South America
