= HIV/AIDS in Bolivia =

HIV/AIDS in Bolivia has a less than 1 percent prevalence of Bolivia's adult population estimated to be HIV-positive. Bolivia has one of the lowest HIV prevalence rates in the Latin America and Caribbean region.

== Prevalence ==
Bolivia’s first case of HIV was diagnosed in 1985. Since then, the epidemic has been largely concentrated in groups of men who have sex with men (MSM). In May 2007, the Government of Bolivia reported a total of 2,464 cases of HIV since the beginning of the epidemic. UNAIDS, which included estimates of unknown cases, reported in 2005 that 7,000 people in Bolivia were HIV-infected, but estimates vary widely between 3,800 and 17,000 people.

== Transmission ==
HIV prevalence rates in Bolivia are highest among MSM, who had infection levels of 15 percent in La Paz and nearly 24 percent in Santa Cruz, according to a 2005 report cited by UNAIDS. Homeless boys and girls also appear to be vulnerable to HIV infection. A recent study of street youth in Cochabamba found that 3.5 percent were HIV-positive. In part because of governmental regulation that requires sex workers to regularly visit sexually transmitted infection (STI) clinics for checkups, HIV rates among sex workers have remained low. Patterns from other countries in the region suggest that Bolivian sex workers may be another population at risk for HIV/AIDS.

Several factors put Bolivia in danger of a wider HIV/AIDS epidemic, including high levels of migration from rural to urban areas, and social norms that encourage men to have multiple sexual partners. In the 2003 Bolivia Demographic and Health Survey (DHS), 23 percent of single men aged 15 to 49 had multiple sex partners in the preceding 12 months, which puts them and their sex partners at risk for HIV/AIDS. There is a lack of basic knowledge and information about the disease, with 24 percent of women aged 15 to 49 reporting that they have never heard of the disease.

High rates of violence, including sexual abuse, contribute to the spread of the disease. Many false beliefs persist, with 45 percent of those surveyed in the DHS maintaining that a person who looks healthy cannot have HIV. Compounding these issues are stigma and discrimination against HIV-infected individuals and at-risk groups and limited resources at the public and private levels.

== National response ==
The Government of Bolivia has made a political commitment to confront the HIV/AIDS epidemic. Its allocation of resources to its national STI/HIV/AIDS program has been uneven, and sustainability is not guaranteed. The low levels of HIV funding are due to the limitations of Bolivia’s health system, which reaches only about 70 percent of the population, and the more immediate threats of other infectious diseases – tuberculosis, malaria, Chagas disease, leishmaniasis, dengue fever, and yellow fever – that demand the majority of Bolivia’s health funds.

The government consistently signals its dedication to confronting the epidemic. The most recent example is the joint signing in February 2007 of an agreement to implement the Adoption of Attitudes and Practices to Prevent HIV-AIDS at the Interior of the Armed Forces project by the Ministry of National Defense, the Ministry of Health and Sports, the Commander-In-Chief of the Armed Forces, and UNAIDS.

Bolivia has been able to mobilise support from the international community, and a large proportion of its funding comes from external sources. For instance, the UN Theme Group and the UNAIDS Country Coordinator support projects targeting vulnerable populations. Coverage of HIV services to vulnerable groups is low, reaching only 3 percent of MSM and 30 percent of sex workers. The Global Fund to Fight AIDS, Tuberculosis and Malaria targets HIV-infected and -affected individuals in nine provinces for integral care, including anti-retroviral treatment (ART); laboratory and psychological support; and treatment of opportunistic illnesses. Currently, ART reaches only 24 percent of the target population of people living with HIV/AIDS (PLWHA).

Bolivia is a partner in the Brazil+7 initiative, a UNICEF-, UNAIDS-, and Brazilian-led effort dedicated to expanding HIV/AIDS prevention, treatment, and care for pregnant women and young people; to offering universal access to ART for PLWHA; and to ensuring universal access to services for prevention of mother-to-child transmission (PMTCT). The other partner countries are São Tomé and Príncipe, Nicaragua, Paraguay, Cape Verde, Guinea-Bissau, and East Timor.

== See also ==
- HIV/AIDS in South America
