= Fundación Huésped =

Foundation in Buenos Aires, Argentina

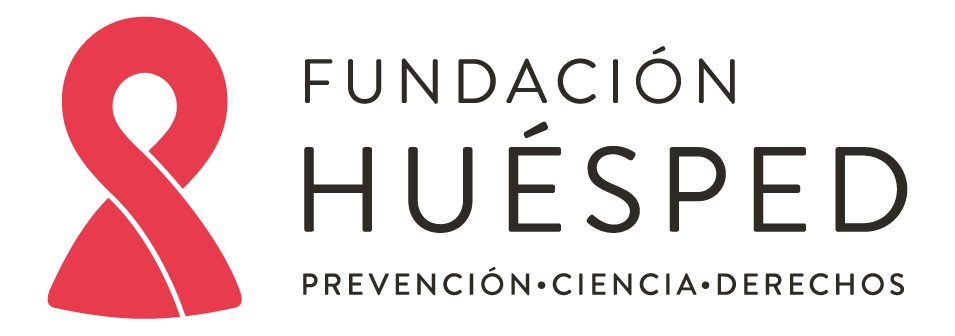
- Formation: 1989; 37 years ago
- Founder: Pedro Cahn, Kurt Frieder
- Type: Nonprofit foundation
- Location: Buenos Aires, Argentina
- Website: https://www.huesped.org.ar/

Fundación Huésped is a nonprofit foundation in Argentina. It was created in 1989 for the purpose of fighting HIV/AIDS, with a specific focus on creating a social environment that would allow the disease to be overcome. Since October 2015, the foundation has maintained a free testing center which allows rapid diagnosis of HIV/AIDS.

== History ==
The first General Coordinator of Fundación Huésped was Roberto Jáuregui, who was one of the first people in Argentina to contract HIV and the first to make the diagnosis public. Jáuregui died in 1994.

== Activity ==
In December 2016, Fundación Huésped recorded a television program titled Sutiles Diferencias ("Subtle Differences"). The program, which was broadcast on the network El Trece, explored the stigma around HIV/AIDS in Argentina. It was the ninth year in a row that El Trece showed a special program produced by the foundation.

In September 2020, the foundation began recruiting volunteers to test a COVID-19 vaccine developed by the Sinopharm Group.

On December 30, 2020, the foundation's headquarters was vandalized with the word asesinos, meaning murderers. The vandalism took place during a vote to legalize abortion in the National Congress of Argentina. The foundation's Scientific Director Pedro Cahn had previously advocated for legalization of abortion in Argentina.
