= HIV adult prevalence rate =

Share of the population infected with HIV

HIV death rates by age

The human immunodeficiency virus (HIV), which causes AIDS, varies in prevalence from countries. Listed here are the prevalence rates among adults in various countries, based on data from various sources, largely the CIA World Factbook.

As of 2024, around 40.8 million people, and 0.7% of the adult population (15–49), were estimated to be infected with HIV globally. Prevalence was higher among sex workers, gay and bisexual men, people who inject drugs, transgender people, and prisoners.

The HIV pandemic is most severe in Southern Africa. Over 10% of all people infected with HIV/AIDS reside within the region. Adult HIV prevalence exceeds 20% in Eswatini, Botswana, Lesotho and Zimbabwe, while an additional five countries report adult HIV prevalence of at least 10%.

In absolute numbers, South Africa (9.2 million)—, Mozambique (2.48 million), and Nigeria (2.45 million)—had the highest number of HIV/AIDS cases by the start of 2024. While South Africa's large population of HIV-positive people is attributable to its high disease prevalence (17.3%, one of the highest in the world), Nigeria's is lower at 1.3%. However, countries such as Nigeria with high HIV rates above 1% are classified as having Generalized HIV Epidemics (GHEs) by UNAIDS.

== Prevalence estimates table ==
This data was sourced from the CIA World Factbook and UNAIDS AIDS info website unless referenced otherwise. A horizontal dash "-" indicates the data was not published. Adult prevalence describes ages between 15 and 49.

Country/Region	Adult prevalence of HIV/AIDS	Number of people with HIV/AIDS	Annual deaths from HIV/AIDS	Year of estimate
Eswatini	28.30%	240,000	3,001	2024
Lesotho	26.20%	445,000	7,000	2025
Botswana	22.80%	399,100	5,275	2025
Zimbabwe	23.10%	2,460,000	28,000	2025
South Africa	14.40%	9,400,000	80,000	2025
Mozambique	12.65%	2,485,000	59,100	2024
Namibia	11.80%			2021
Malawi	11.40%	1,642,570	15,270	2024
Equatorial Guinea	7.71%	74,466	2,400	2025
Tanzania	8.20%	3,410,000	39,000	2025
Kenya	5.30%	1,750,000	28,000	2025
Uganda	5%	1,590,000	23,300	2023
Togo	5.20%	220,440	6,600	2024
Cameroon	4%	530,000	14,600	2023
Gabon	4.50%	68,000	4,800	2025
Central African Republic	4%	126,200	4,400	2024
Guinea-Bissau	3.65%	42,000	2,200	2023
Congo, Republic of the	3.77%	110,840	6,700	2024
Barbados	0.9%	2,100	-	2023
Rwanda	2.90%	230,000	2,800	2016
Côte d'Ivoire	2.70%	430,000	13,000	2016
South Sudan	2.40%	190,000	9,100	2016
Gambia, The	2.40%	31,000	1,540	2023
Haiti	2.20%	180,000	3,000	2023
Nigeria	2.20%	2,450,000	56,500	2024
Belize	3%	6,000	-	2025
Angola	2.10%	355,000	15,000	2024
Ghana	2.00%	361,897	22,000	2025
Bahamas, The	1.10%	3,988	-	2025
Jamaica	1.65%	32,000	1,000	2019
Saint Vincent and the Grenadines	1.60%	860	-	2023
Russian Federation	1.50%	1,137,000	24,000	2023
Liberia	1.50%	50,000	2,300	2023
Sierra Leone	1.50%	78,000	2,600	2019
Guinea	1.40%	110,000	3,100	2016
Guyana	1.40%	8,700	-	2019
Suriname	1.30%	5,800	-	2019
Djibouti	1.50%	9,100	-	2024
Burundi	1.20%	85,000	1,800	2016
Chad	1.20%	120,000	3,200	2016
Mali	3%	260,000	8,000	2025
Trinidad and Tobago	1.20%	11,000	-	2016
Thailand	1.31%	800,000	25,000	2024
Ethiopia	1.40%	760,000	25,000	2024
Israel	0.20%	-	-	2018
Ukraine	1.10%	260,000	9,100	2023
Benin	1.00%	67,000	2,400	2016
Dominican Republic	0.9%	67,000	2,200	2024
Papua New Guinea	0.90%	46,000	1,100	2016
Cabo Verde	0.80%	2,800	-	2016
Panama	1.30%	42,000	-	2024
Myanmar	1.20%	281,000	8,400	2024
Burkina Faso	0.80%	95,000	3,100	2016
Congo, Democratic Republic of	0.70%	370,000	19,000	2016
Georgia	1.00%	25,000	-	2024
Latvia	0.85%	8,000	-	2024
Cambodia	1.10%	172,000	3,700	2024
Venezuela	0.70%	160,000	4,700	2024
Moldova	1.10%	23,800	-	2024
Brazil	0.60%	1,250,000	18,400	2021
Eritrea	0.60%	15,000	-	2016
El Salvador	0.60%	24,000	-	2016
Uruguay	1.10%	46,000	-	2024
Mauritania	0.50%	11,000	-	2016
Chile	2.00%	155,000	-	2024
Guatemala	2.01%	105,000	3,000	2025
Paraguay	1.10%	27,850	-	2024
Portugal	0.5%	47,000	-	2024
Niger	0.40%	48,000	3,400	2016
Malaysia	0.30%	110,000	7,400	2024
Indonesia	0.50%	660,000	47,000	2024
Honduras	0.40%	21,000	-	2016
Cuba	1.10%	35,000	-	2024
Costa Rica	0.40%	13,000	-	2016
Colombia	0.60%	145,000	5,250	2024
Argentina	0.65%	150,000	3,100	2024
Belarus	1.00%	24,000	-	2016
Senegal	2.30%	54,000	5,100	2024
United States	0.42%	1,427,155	-	2024
Bolivia	0.40%	24,000	-	2023
France	0.30%	231,791	-	2024
Mexico	0.35%	181,820	5,120	2024
Ecuador	0.30%	33,000	-	2016
Peru	0.30%	70,000	2,200	2016
Italy	0.30%	200,000	-	2024
Laos	0.30%	11,000	-	2016
Spain	0.70%	188,000	-	2024
Tajikistan	0.30%	14,000	-	2016
Vietnam	0.70%	271,000	5,200	2024
Armenia	0.20%	3,300	-	2016
India	0.20%	2,300,000	35,000	2024
Kazakhstan	0.40%	52,000	-	2024
Kyrgyzstan	0.20%	8,500	-	2016
Lithuania	0.45%	11,000	-	2024
Madagascar	0.20%	31,000	1,600	2016
Nepal	0.92%	46,000	3,500	2024
Germany	0.25%	100,000	-	2023
Canada	0.21%	75,000	-	2023
Netherlands	0.50%	59,900	-	2024
Nicaragua	0.20%	8,900	-	2016
Sudan	0.20%	56,000	3,000	2016
Sweden	0.20%	11,000	-	2016
Switzerland	0.21%	18,000	-	2022
United Kingdom	0.17%	116,000	-	2024
Bhutan	0.16%	1,265	-	2018
Ireland	0.55%	18,000	-	2024
Greenland	0.13%	70	-	2018
Norway	0.45%	19,050	305	2024
Philippines	0.19%	215,400	834	2024
Denmark	0.11%	6,500	-	2018
Turkey	0.11%	66,766	-	2026
Albania	0.10%	1,700	-	2016
Australia	0.10%	28,880	-	2023
Fiji	0.10%	468	-	2019
Taiwan	0.10%	31,620	-	2016
Azerbaijan	0.10%	9,200	-	2016
Morocco	0.10%	14,000	-	2025
Iran	0.10%	66,000	4,000	2016
Somalia	-	436	-	2023
Pakistan	0.10%	130,000	5,500	2016
Poland	0.08%	30,092	1,471	2022
Bangladesh	-	12,000	1,000	2016
Egypt	-	11,000	-	2016
Yemen	-	9,900	-	2016
Afghanistan	-	7,500	-	2016
Sri Lanka	-	4,000	-	2016
Bulgaria	-	3,500	-	2016
Tunisia	-	2,900	-	2016
Serbia	0.04%	2,700	-	2016
Croatia	0.14%	2,700	-	2023
China	0.09%	1,250,000	-	2018
Malta	0.088%	453	-	2019
Lebanon	0.063%	3,750	-	2016
Czech Republic	0.051%	3,122	-	2019
Montenegro	0.12%	401	-	2023
Algeria	0.029%	13,000	-	2016
Saudi Arabia	0.024%	8,200	-	2016
Bosnia and Herzegovina	0.009%	350	-	2018
Kosovo	0.004%	83	-	2013
Turkmenistan	-	720	-	2021
Grenada	-	5,300	-	2023
Antigua and Barbuda	-	84	-	2022
Turks and Caicos Islands	-	1,000	-	2023
Samoa	-	1,100	-	2023
Dominica	-	240	-	2023
Iraq	0.24%	4,700	-	2021
United Arab Emirates	0.20%	23,000	10,000	2024
East Timor	-	30	-	2022
Finland	0.40%	6,000	1,500	2021
Svalbard	-	2	-	2023
Kiribati	-	68	-	2025
Estonia	0.2%	1,000	-	2025
Saint Kitts and Nevis	-	100	-	2023
Singapore	0.172%	7,248	-	2025
Mauritius	0.16%	6,671	-	2022
Hong Kong	0.16%	11,737	-	2023
Palau	-	310	-	2023
Tonga	-	400	-	2023
Japan	0.02%	21,739	-	2022
Puerto Rico	-	526	-	2023
Brunei Darussalam	-	40	-	2024
Comoros	-	188	-	2023
Niue	-	35	-	2023
Seychelles	-	86	-	2023
Kuwait	-	400	-	2023
Iceland	-	448	-	2019
Anguilla	-	500	-	2024
French Polynesia	-	290	-	2023
South Korea	0.029%	15,196	-	2023
New Zealand	-	3,033	-	2023
Austria	-	3,000	-	2023
Cyprus	-	1,200	-	2023
Tuvalu	5.2%	702	-	2022
Libya	0.09%	6,700	-	2024
Christmas Island	-	13	-	2024
Hungary	0.11%	10,000	-	2023
Romania	-	1,660	-	2024
Réunion	-	118	-	2024
São Tomé and Príncipe	-	15,600	-	2023
Uzbekistan	-	48,658	-	2024
Slovakia	-	2,000	-	2023
Belgium	-	4,000	-	2024
Greece	0.01057%	1,100	-	2024
Vanuatu	-	325	-	2023
Mongolia	-	2,500	-	2024
British Virgin Islands	-	48	-	2024
American Samoa	-	110	-	2023
Nauru	-	270	-	2024
Marshall Islands	-	19	-	2024
Saint Lucia	-	287	-	2025
Andorra	-	600	-	2025
Federated States of Micronesia	-	149	-	2025
Jordan	0.017%	2,000	-	2025
Luxembourg	-	5,700	-	2025
Maldives	-	660	-	2025
Bahrain	-	2,000	-	2024
Montserrat	-	127	-	2025
North Macedonia	-	5,600	-	2025
Gibraltar	-	198	-	2025
Wallis and Futuna	-	444	-	2025
Qatar	-	3,000	-	2025
North Korea	-	550	-	2024

== See also ==
- AIDS pandemic

By region:

- HIV/AIDS in Africa
- HIV/AIDS in Asia
- HIV/AIDS in Europe
- HIV/AIDS in North America
- HIV/AIDS in South America
