= HIV/AIDS in Guyana =

Approximately 1.6% of adults in Guyana are living with HIV/AIDS, and Guyana has had HIV prevalence rates that are relatively high for the Caribbean. Globally, Guyana had the 20th highest HIV prevalence rate compared to other countries in 2023. As of 2024, it is estimated that 11,000 adults and children are living with HIV in Guyana. The country has experienced both a percentage increase in new HIV infections and AIDS related deaths since 2010.

Guyana is pursuing 95-95-95 targets, for 95% of all people living with HIV to know their status, for 95% of these people to be on treatment, and for 95% of people on treatment to be virally suppressed. At the end of 2023, Guyana achieved 94%-72%-87% of these three targets.

== Prevalence ==
Since the first case of AIDS was reported in Guyana in 1987, there was a steady increase in its prevalence through 2007. Though Guyana saw a slight decrease in HIV infections from 2006 to 2011, new infections increased by 19% from 2010 to 2024.

Previously, AIDS was the leading cause of death among adults aged 25-44, and in 2002, HIV/AIDS was the second leading cause of death of Guyanese adults, primarily aged 20-30. In the early 2000s, Guyana was one of five Latin American countries where the HIV epidemic had become generalized. In 2013, Guyana had the third-highest prevalence of HIV in Caribbean countries.

The number of reported HIV/AIDS cases in Guyana was reduced to 1% of the total population in 2009–2010, complying with the UNAIDS target of 1.3%. A national report on HIV/AIDS for 2009 reveals that over 105,000 HIV/AIDS tests were conducted in Guyana.

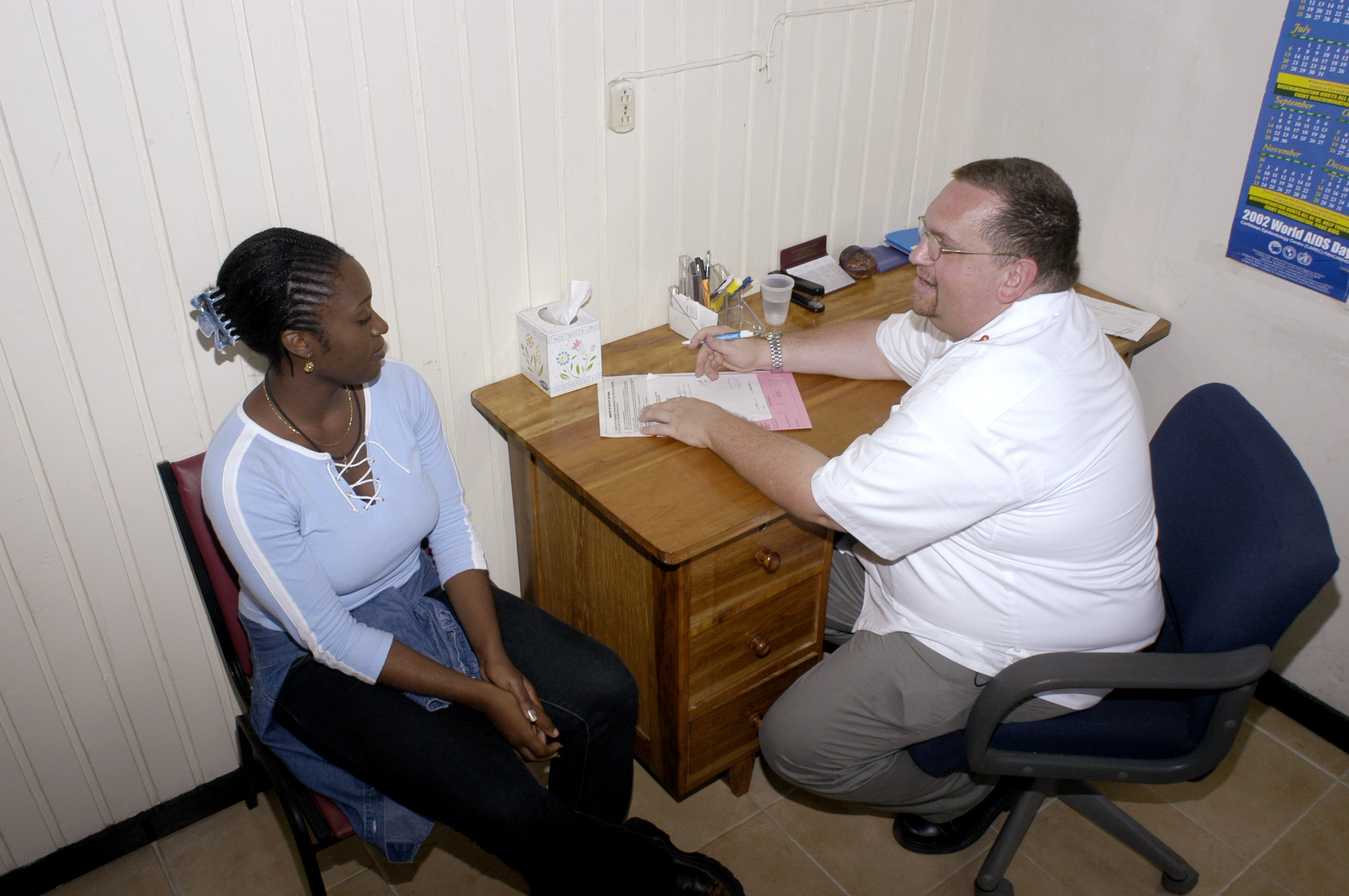
A Community Health Worker, working to educate people about HIV and AIDS, in Georgetown, Guyana in 2003.

HIV prevalence has remained persistent among homosexual men, men who have sex with men (MSM), transgender people, and sex workers. Young women, and young people generally, are also particularly impacted by HIV, making education, testing, and early diagnosis for treatment of ongoing importance.

In its 2019 HIV Prevention Guidelines for Guyana, USAID identified miners and loggers as priority populations. Loggers in Guyana are a significant segment of the migrant worker population. With forests generally found in isolated areas, there can be a lack of regular access to both condoms and correct knowledge of how HIV is transmitted, which increases vulnerability to infection.

== National response ==
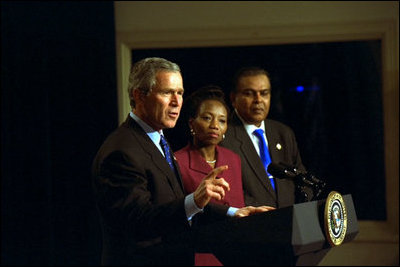
U.S. President George W. Bush discusses Global and Domestic HIV and AIDS in 2003, pictured with Uganda's Ambassador to the U.S. Edith Ssempala, center, and Guyana's Ambassador to the U.S. Odeen Ishmael.

There has been international engagement to mitigate HIV/AIDS in Guyana. Guyana was one of 15 focus countries of the United States President's Emergency Plan For AIDS Relief (PEPFAR) announced in 2003 by President George W. Bush. The focus countries collectively represented roughly 50% of HIV infections worldwide, and the Emergency Plan was the largest international health initiative by one nation to address a single disease.

Additional entities engaged include USAID, UNAIDS, and the World Bank.

As of 2021, Guyana had a multi-year, costed national strategy to respond to HIV, along with continued PEPFAR funding support.

In parallel, health agencies and organizations have reduced funding to Guyana as it is no longer listed as a High Prevalence Country for HIV/AIDS.
