= HIV/AIDS in Asia =

In 2008, 4.7 million people in Asia were living with human immunodeficiency virus (HIV). Asia's epidemic peaked in the mid-1990s, and annual HIV incidence has declined since then by more than half. Regionally, the epidemic has remained somewhat stable since 2000.

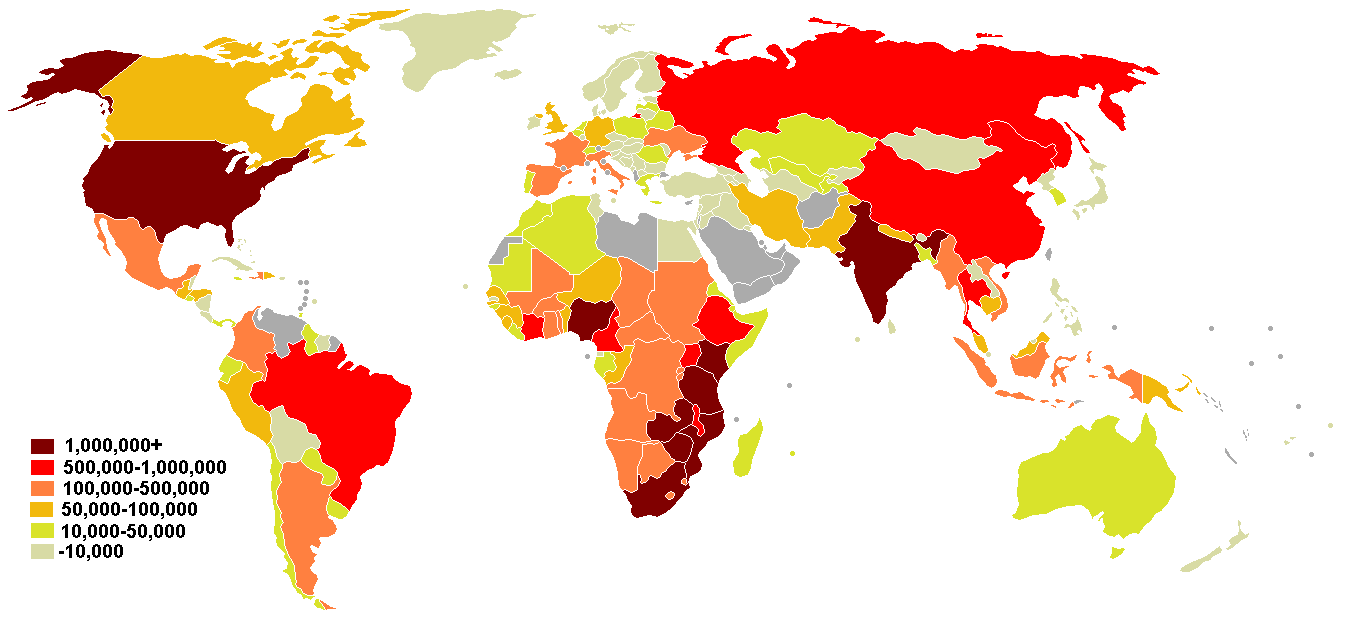
People living with HIV/AIDS (CIA), in absolute numbers, 2008. Large numbers of people live with HIV even in countries with relatively low HIV prevalence levels due to their large populations.

The estimated per capita prevalence of HIV among young adults (15–49) by country, 2011.

== South Asia ==
Compared with other regions, notably Africa and the Americas, national HIV prevalence levels in South Asia are very low (0.3% in the adult (15–49) group). However, due to the large populations of many South Asian nations, this low national HIV prevalence still means that many people have HIV.

In South Asia, the HIV epidemic remains largely concentrated in injecting drug users, men who have sex with men, sex workers, clients of sex workers and their immediate sexual partners. Prevention strategies in these populations are, for the most part, inadequate.

=== Afghanistan ===
The prevalence of HIV in Afghanistan is 0.04%. 504 cases of HIV/AIDS were documented in late 2008. By the end of 2012, the number reached 1,327. As of 2015, as many as 6,900 people were living in Afghanistan with HIV. About 300 were known to have died from the disease.

=== Bangladesh ===
With less than 0.1% of the population estimated to be HIV-positive, Bangladesh is a low HIV-prevalence country. In 2008, an estimated 11,000 people lived with HIV in Bangladesh.

=== Bhutan ===
In 2011, there were 246 reported cases of HIV in Bhutan, representing just over 0.03% of the population. Health Ministry sources indicated that actual numbers were estimated at more than 500 by UNAIDS.

=== India ===
In 2015, the NACO estimated that 2.11 million people live with HIV/AIDS in India. In 2018, India had the third most people with HIV after South Africa and Nigeria. The AIDS prevalence rate in India is lower than many other countries. In 2016, India's AIDS prevalence rate stood at approximately 0.30%, the 80th highest in the world.

=== Nepal ===
In 2017, approximately 375,000 people in Nepal were HIV-positive. In 2014, the national HIV prevalence was 0.20%. By the end of 2018, the number of people living with HIV was 139,000. NCASC (2019) reports that the estimated number of HIV infections by risk groups is 159,984.

=== Pakistan ===
In 2018, there were an estimated 160,000 people living with HIV. In 2007, there were 39,529 cases of HIV registered with the National AIDS Control Program, of which 22,947 were receiving antiretroviral therapy. In 2018, the HIV prevalence rate was far higher among people who inject drugs (21.0%) compared to the general population of people aged 15 to 49 (0.1%).

== East Asia ==
National HIV prevalence levels in East Asia are much lower (0.1% in the adult (15-49) group) than in much of Africa and the Americas. Similar to South Asian countries, low national HIV prevalence still means that large numbers of people are living with HIV.

=== China ===
Much of the current spread of HIV in the People's Republic of China is through intravenous drug abuse and paid sex. In rural areas, especially in Henan province, large numbers of farmers had contaminated blood transfusions; estimates of those infected are in the tens of thousands.

=== Japan ===
Official figures (English) for July–October 2006 showed that just over half of domestic HIV/AIDS cases were among homosexual men, with the remainder transmitted through heterosexual intercourse, drug abuse, in the womb or via unknown means. As of 2015, there had been 17,909 HIV and 8,086 AIDS cases reported in Japan since 1985.

=== North Korea ===
In 2006, less than 0.2% of North Korea's adult population had HIV. In 2006, the WHO estimated that North Korea had less than 100 people with HIV/AIDS. Officially, North Korea maintains that it is completely free of AIDS.

=== South Korea ===
In 2009, the cumulative reported cases of HIV in South Korea surpassed 6,000, with 797 reported in 2008.

According to the Korea Centers for Disease Control and Prevention, the prevalence of HIV in South Korea is rising. The first case of HIV was in 1985. By 2000, the number of people diagnosed with HIV was 219. This rose to 797 in 2008. Males had a much higher infection rate. In order to prevent Korean women from contracting HIV, HIV positive males should be detected early on. The most commonly recognized mode of transmission in South Korea is through heterosexual sexual contact.

Due to the lower prevalence of HIV in South Korea, the Korean media has represented HIV as a disease brought to Korea by migrant sex workers from other countries. Any sex workers who plan to stay in South Korea must test for HIV, and if results show they are positive, they are no longer able to stay in the country.

=== Taiwan ===
As of March 2016, there were 31,620 reported cases of Taiwanese nationals testing positive for HIV/AIDS. Currently, HIV/AIDS patients who are Taiwanese nationals receive free medical care (including HAART therapies) from the state. Non-governmental organizations have set up "AIDS Half-Way Houses" for homeless patients. The ratio of patients who are drug users has increased rapidly, which has led the authority to promote a harm reduction program.

== South-East Asia ==
National HIV prevalence levels in South-East Asia are very low, at 0.3% in the adult (15-49) group. In Southeast Asia, the HIV epidemic remains largely concentrated in injecting drug users, men who have sex with men, sex workers, and clients of sex workers and their immediate sexual partners. Prevention strategies in these populations are generally inadequate.

=== Cambodia ===
Between 2003 and 2005, the estimated HIV prevalence among Cambodian adults aged 15 to 49 declined from 2.0% to 1.6%.

=== Indonesia ===
In 2009, UNAIDS said that HIV/AIDS in Indonesia is one of Asia's fastest growing epidemics. It was expected that 5 million Indonesians would have HIV/AIDS by 2010. In 2007, Indonesia was ranked 99th in the world by prevalence rate. Because of low understanding of the symptoms of the disease and high social stigma attached to it, only 5–10% of HIV/AIDS sufferers were diagnosed and treated.

=== Laos ===
In 2005, UNAIDS estimated that 3,700 people in Lao PDR were living with HIV. Lao PDR currently faces a concentrated epidemic with an adult HIV prevalence of 0.1%.

=== Malaysia ===
In June 2008, Malaysia reported 82,704 cumulative HIV cases since 1986.

=== Myanmar ===
In 2005, the estimated adult HIV prevalence rate in Myanmar was 1.3% (200,000–570,000 people) according to UNAIDS, and early indicators show that the epidemic may be waning in the country, although the epidemic continues to expand in parts of the country. An estimated 20,000 (range between 11,000 and 35,000) die from HIV/AIDS annually.

=== Philippines ===
The Philippines has a relatively low incidence of HIV/AIDS. There have been about 2,800 reported cases since 1984, but independent estimates put the number of cases closer to 12,000. The majority (70–75%) of carriers are male, 25–39, and the predominant mode of transmission is through sexual intercourse.

Although the national incidence rate remains relatively low, an independent HIV surveillance study conducted in 2010 by Dr. Louie Mar Gangcuangco and colleagues from the University of the Philippines-Philippine General Hospital showed that out of 406 men having sex with men tested for HIV in Metro Manila, HIV prevalence was at 11.8% (95% confidence interval: 8.7–15.0).

=== Singapore ===
The Ministry of Health maintains a confidential registry of HIV positive individuals. The private details of 8,800 foreigners and 5,400 Singaporeans infected with HIV were exposed as a result of improper handling of the data. The details of some 5,400 Singaporeans and permanent residents diagnosed with HIV up to January 2013, and 8,800 foreigners diagnosed up to December 2011 were leaked, by Mikhy Farrera-Brochez, a US citizen. It was in retaliation for Farrera-Brochez being deported from Singapore for falsify documents that granted him work privileges in Singapore and for covering up the fact he has HIV on an application form. He was supplied the details by his, then boyfriend, Ler Teck Siang, a doctor in Singapore. Ler also provided his own blood sample to cover up Farrera-Brochez's HIV status.

=== Thailand ===
Around 532,522 Thais were living with HIV/AIDS in 2008.

=== Timor-Leste (East Timor) ===
Timor-Leste is a low HIV-prevalence country with less than 0.2% of the adult population estimated to be HIV-positive. Forty-three cases of the disease were confirmed in 2007 and are now under treatment, according to the Ministry of Health.

=== Vietnam ===
In 2008, an estimated 290,000 people were living with HIV.

== West Asia ==
=== Azerbaijan ===
The adult prevalence rate was less than 0.2% in 2012, with an estimated 10,400 people living with HIV/AIDS and 65 deaths.

=== Bahrain ===
The adult prevalence rate was estimated at 0.01% in 2016, with fewer than 500 people with HIV/AIDS and fewer than 100 deaths.

=== Jordan ===
In 2007, there were an estimated 380,000 people living with HIV/AIDS (PLWHA) in the region, according to UNAIDS.

=== Saudi Arabia ===
In 2003, the number of known cases of HIV/AIDS in Saudi Arabia was 6,700, and over 10,000 in June 2008.

=== Turkey ===
In 2002, 7,000–14,000 people had been infected with AIDS since the beginning of the pandemic. In June 2002, 1,429 HIV/AIDS cases had been reported since 1985.

=== United Arab Emirates ===
Official figures show that 540 people were living with HIV/AIDS by the end of 2006, and the number of recorded new cases was about 35 annually.

== See also ==
- AIDS pandemic
- HIV/AIDS in Africa
- HIV/AIDS in Europe
- HIV/AIDS in North America
- HIV/AIDS in South America
