= HIV/AIDS in Colombia =

With an estimated 120,000 people living with HIV/AIDS, the HIV/AIDS epidemic in Colombia is consistent with the epidemic in much of Latin America as a whole, both in terms of prevalence of infection and characteristics of transmission and affected populations. Colombia has a relatively low rate of HIV infection at 0.4%. Colombia's health care system and conception of a "right to health", created by the T-760 decision of 2008, have revolutionized access to HIV treatment. Despite this, the quality of health insurance and treatment for HIV has often been disputed.

== Prevalence ==
Approximately 120,000 people in Colombia are living with HIV, according to UNAIDS. Colombia's rate of HIV prevalence, which is 0.4%, is on par with HIV prevalence in other Latin American and Caribbean nations. New HIV infections in Colombia peaked between the years of 1993–1997, and have since dropped off. In recent years, the estimated number of new HIV infections in Colombia has dropped gradually, with an estimated 5,600 new infections in 2016.

HIV is more common among men than women in Colombia. Men have an HIV prevalence rate of about 0.6%, whereas women have a prevalence rate of about 0.2%.

== Testing and treatment ==
A 2012 study that surveyed the records of almost 30,000 Colombians between the ages of 18 and 69 found that 19.7% had been tested for HIV. People living in rural areas, people with less education, men, and people over the age of 65 were less likely to have been tested than the general population. Women, urbanites, people with more education, and young people were more likely to have been tested than the general population. Consistent with factors throughout the region and the world, common reasons given for not seeking HIV testing included a low-risk perception of becoming infected, feeling healthy, stigma associated with HIV, and feeling unprepared, both financially and emotionally, for the possibility of an HIV diagnosis. In Colombia, 36% of people living with AIDS have virally suppressed loads.

== Government policies ==
Two landmark decisions, one in 1993 and one in 2008, significantly altered access to HIV treatment in Colombia. At the beginning of the HIV epidemic, about 20% of Colombia's population was on private healthcare, with the rest relying on public health care.

In 1993, the passage of Law 100 created a system of privatized but regulated universal health care—under the new system, private insurance companies competed for clients with government oversight. Insurance companies were mandated only to cover treatment listed under Colombia's obligatory health plan. There were two types of insurance schemes under the new system—one to which employees and employers contributed, and one which was subsidized by the government.

Although the contributory scheme offered more comprehensive health care overall, the antiretroviral medication used to treat HIV (AZT) was not covered under either version of the government's obligatory health plan. Individuals seeking AZT were forced to file tutelas, or pleas, in order to access it. One activist action, called Operation Wasp, involved filing seven tutelas in seven different courts in Bogotá so as to occupy the court dockets for ten days. All of the judges targeted by Operation Wasp ruled in favor of the tutelas.

In 2008, with annual tutelas totaling around 100,000 the Constitutional Court of Colombia reached the T-760 decision, which made the obligatory government health plan more generous and provided for measures to be taken to decrease the incidence of arbitrary denial of health coverage. The T-760 decision fundamentally reframed how health care was viewed in Colombia, and is commonly viewed as having created a "right to health" conception of health care in which health care is viewed as a human right.

Today, almost 100% of Colombians are insured. The quality of that insurance has often been disputed, with reports of individuals being denied healthcare due to administrative or bureaucratic reasons.

=== Needle and syringe program ===
In 2014, the Colombian Ministry of Health launched needle and syringe programs (NSPs) in five Colombian cities: Medellín, Bogotá, Cali, Cucuta, and Armenia. At its launch, the government allotted 100,000 syringes for distribution to people who inject drugs, in most cases heroin.

=== Opioid substitution therapy ===
Colombia is one of only five countries in Latin America and the Caribbean to offer opioid substitution therapy, a drug therapy that involves replacing a drug such as heroin with another, less harmful opioid. In theory, OST would reduce rates of infection among intravenous drug users by decreasing the use of injection drugs. OST services are available in seven Colombian cities, but it is unknown how widely used these services are.

== AIDS activism in Colombia ==
Influenced by the emergence of similar groups in the U.S., early AIDS activism in Colombia initially consisted of support groups for people with AIDS. These groups, such as Seguro Social, El Club de la Alegría, and El Cartel de la Vida, focused initially on issues such as self-care and support for people with AIDS. Later, the groups shifted their focus towards access to treatment for HIV and AIDS. Consistent with AIDS activism in other countries, early AIDS activism in Colombia was closely linked to LGBTQ organizations and the LGBTQ community as a whole.

== Affected populations ==
=== Men who have sex with men ===
Men who have sex with men in Colombia experience significantly higher rates of HIV infection than does the general population. The prevalence of HIV among MSM in Colombia ranges from 6% to 24%, and is highest in Cali, Bogotá, and Barranquilla. Bogotá's rate of HIV among MSM is 15%, and the rate of HIV among MSM in Colombia as a whole is 17%.

In a survey of seven Colombian cities, between 14% and 31% of men who have sex with men reported ever being tested for HIV.

=== Intravenous drug Users ===
In Colombia, people who inject drugs had an HIV prevalence rate of 2.8% in 2017. Although additional studies are needed, recent epidemiological studies have shown an increase in both heroin usage and heroin injection in Colombia. Of particular note is the fact that though exported heroin in Colombia is of high quality, the heroin that is not exported and remains in Colombia to be sold to Colombian drug users tends to be of low quality and therefore tends to be water-soluble, which makes it more likely to be injected. A primary concern about the rise in the rate of drug injection in Colombia is the spread of HIV, both among drug-injecting and non drug-injecting populations. A 2014 study found that heroin production in Colombia had formed "injection networks" which have the potential to spread HIV, particularly among young men.

=== Sex workers ===
The 2017 prevalence of HIV among sex workers in Colombia was 1.2%. Over 90% of sex workers are aware of their HIV status, and over 94% report condom usage. At the same time, many sex workers say that the see HIV testing as pointless, because they lack access to adequate treatment should they test positive.
