= HIV/AIDS in Europe =

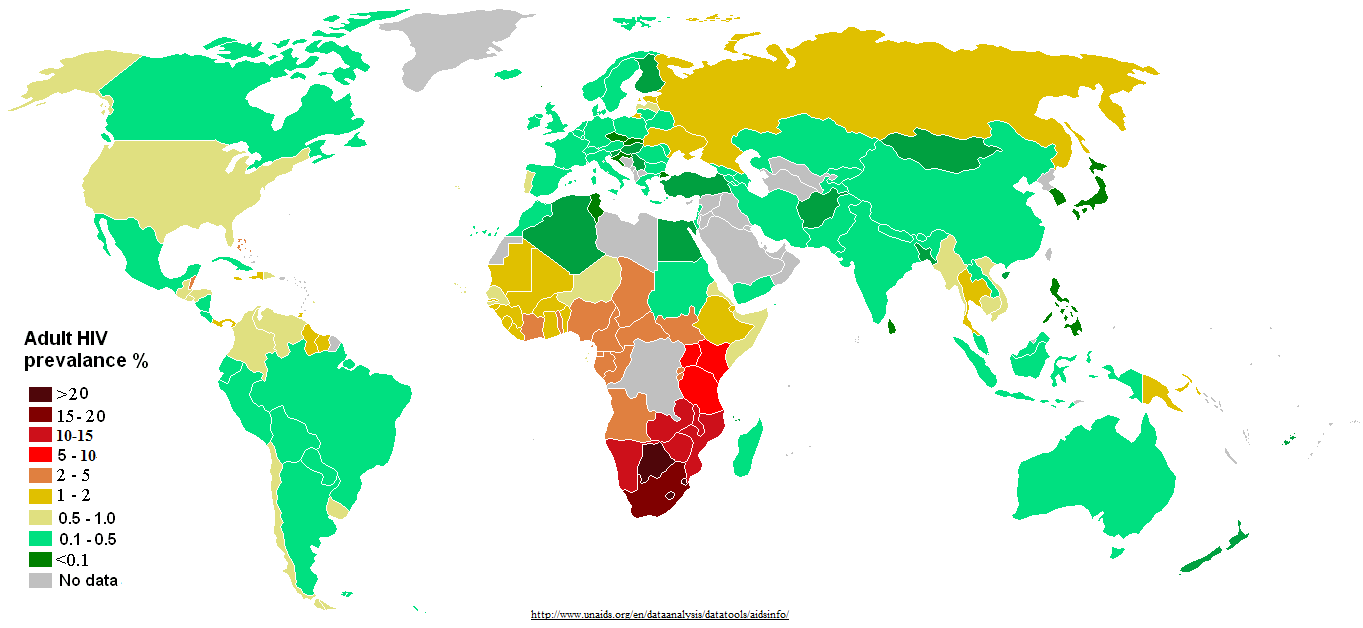
Estimated prevalence of HIV/AIDS by country 2011

In Western Europe, the routes of transmission of HIV are diverse, including paid sex, sex between men, intravenous drugs, mother to child transmission, and heterosexual sex. However, many new infections in this region occur through contact with HIV-infected individuals from other regions. In some areas of Europe, such as the Baltic countries, the most common route of HIV transmission is through injecting drug use and heterosexual sex, including paid sex.

The adult (15–49) prevalence in Europe in 2018 varied from a high of 1.20% in Russia to a low of 0.1% in eleven countries. Due to the availability of antiretroviral therapy, deaths from AIDS have stayed low since the introduction of protease inhibitors and combination therapy in the late 1990s. 14% are believed to have been infected by intravenous drug use in 2018.

Regarding the social effects of the HIV/AIDS pandemic, there has been since the 1980s a "profound re-medicalization of sexuality".

== Albania ==
Albania has a low-prevalence HIV epidemic compared to many other European countries, though recent trends show a gradual increase in new infections and concerns about late diagnosis. Between 1993 and 2023, a total of 1,716 individuals were diagnosed with HIV, including 113 new cases in 2023. The estimated number of people living with HIV (PLHIV) is approximately 1,600 [1,300–1,800].

A significant concern is that around 60% of new HIV diagnoses are made at a late stage of infection, limiting timely treatment and increasing the risk of AIDS-related mortality. Testing services are provided through Voluntary Counselling and Testing (VCT) centers across 13 regions, hospital and laboratory facilities, NGO initiatives, and prison-based centers; however, access remains uneven, particularly for key populations.

In the first 10 months of 2024, Albania recorded 119 new HIV infections, with an incidence of approximately 5 per 100,000 population. The withdrawal of Global Fund support in December 2024 led to shortages of HIV tests and condoms, raising concerns about the sustainability of prevention programmes. Efforts are now underway to expand rapid testing, secure local funding, and introduce pre-exposure prophylaxis (PrEP) as part of future prevention strategies.

== Austria ==
First case diagnosed in 1983. In 2010, 32% of the infected were infected through heterosexual contact. Austria has the highest conduct of HIV testing in Europe.

The median age at the diagnosis lies between 30 and 36 years since 1990. 28.3% of the current cohort participants are female. The rate is highest in Vorarlberg and Upper Austria (both 36.6%). In the subgroup of the heterosexually infected, the rate of women is 50.9%. It is highest in Upper Austria (56.2%), Vorarlberg (53.3%), and Vienna (51.7%). Among patients newly diagnosed in 2010, 32.0% have been infected through heterosexual contacts. Since 2000, 42.8% of newly diagnosed HIV infections were transmitted through heterosexual contacts.

== Armenia ==
The registration of HIV cases in Armenia started in 1988. Armenia was the first nation in the European region, and one of 10 countries worldwide, which proved to have eliminated mother-to-child HIV transmission.

Around 7300 [5700 - 10 000] people in Armenia live with HIV.

== Bosnia and Herzegovina ==
In reference to the global HIV/AIDS epidemic, Bosnia and Herzegovina is considered to be a low prevalence country (less than 0.1%). Ever since the first registered case of AIDS in Bosnia and Herzegovina in 1986 up until the end of 2017, 350 HIV infected persons have been registered and AIDS has developed in 102 cases. 80% of people who live with HIV in Bosnia are males, and the average age of the infected is between 30 and 39 years. The number of infected persons might be a bit higher, because of the fear and stigma people don't get tested. Some professionals estimate that there are between 900 - 1000 people who are HIV positive in Bosnia.

In addition, significant attention should be paid to the Roma section of the population due to their marginalisation, and youths, particularly adolescents and primary school pupils in Urban areas.

In the past couple of years HIV infection has been kept under control in Bosnia and Herzegovina. As of 2021, the country registered approximately 382 persons with HIV or AIDS, with 20 to 30 new cases reported annually. It is safe to say that Bosnia and Herzegovina is a very low prevalence country. Most groups of people that are identified as being exposed to a higher risks of HIV infection are being successfully followed thanks to the BiH programme to combat HIV/AIDS with support provided by the Global Fund to Fight AIDS, Tuberculosis and Malaria.

Through UNDP support, 22 centres were established across the country, which provide free, confidential HIV testing for all. Although Bosnia has free HIV therapy and medicaments, the biggest problem is that there is no access to modern medicaments that are available in some other European countries for example Germany, Austria, France etc.

== Belgium ==
Belgium had a total of 18,908 HIV cases by the end of 2017 (not taking into account the people who are not aware of their infection). Prevalence is 1.7 cases per 1000 inhabitants.

2.4 new cases are diagnosed daily. Most of the newly diagnosed cases were transmitted through heterosexual contact, 49.6%. Secondly, HIV cases transmitted through sexual contact among men having sex with men (MSM) were at 46.6%. Third, 1.3% of HIV cases were transmitted through injected drug use. Despite easy access to HIV blood testing in Belgium, 36% of new cases are diagnosed at late stage of the disease. Late diagnosis is more frequent in the heterosexual population (46%) than in MSM group (27%). Unlike other countries in Europe, Belgium offers HIV testing by all practitioners, clinics, hospitals, and student services. Most diagnosis centers offer rapid and/or 4th generation testing without any costs and anonymously.

97% of diagnosed patients have access to adequate therapy, with viral charge being undetectable in the blood (uninfectious status) and stopping the spread of the disease.

== Bulgaria ==
Around 4000 [3400 - 4400] people in Bulgaria live with HIV.

Romani (Gypsy) men have the highest HIV rate in Bulgaria due to having more sexual partners and lower condom use.

== Czech Republic ==
As of 31 December 2018, there are 3,368 HIV-positive people diagnosed in the Czech Republic, the overall count—including foreigners (446 people)—is then 3,814 people. In 2018, this number increased by 208. The most affected area is the city of Prague (1651 cases). Since 1994, the Czech Republic has performed 28.8 million HIV tests. 415,813 people have received examinations at their own request. 75% of test recipients indicated that the reason for seeking a test was that they were a man who had sex with men. AIDS outbreak at 506 people (as of 31 December 2016, The statistics led from 1 October 1985), of which 255 of them died. The average age of diagnosis is 35 years for men and 39 years for women. In 2018 there was a decrease in diagnoses. There was a decrease of 46 people (citizens and residents) compared to 2017.

== Estonia ==
Biological surveillance of HIV in Estonia started in 1987 and starting from 2016, HIV testing is free of charge for all people, including those who do not have health insurance (for them, costs are covered directly from the state budget). The first HIV case in Estonia was diagnosed in 1988. The rate of newly diagnosed cases of HIV has decreased over the last decade (from 46.1 cases in 2005 to 9.4 cases per 100,000 in 2021). From 2005 to 2015, hetero and homosexual transmission has increased as well as the proportion of cases among people older than 34 years. The number of cases among children and youth has decreased considerably. The proportion of women is stable around 40%. Transmission among people who inject drugs has stabilized but prevalence rates are very high. So far injecting drug use remains the most important transmission route and the HIV epidemic continues to affect vulnerable populations more, particularly injecting drug users (IDUs) and their sexual partners.

In 2018, 190 new cases of HIV and 25 cases of AIDS were diagnosed in Estonia. In 2017, a total of 219 people were diagnosed with HIV and 20 with AIDS. Since testing began in Estonia, a total of 9,878 cases of HIV and 536 cases of AIDS have been diagnosed.

As per data available, 1.3 percent of adults are HIV positive — the highest percentage among all the countries in the European Union. Unfortunately this number is presumed to be exaggerated because of duplicate registration until 2008 as a result of which 20-30 percent more diagnoses could have been recorded. The statistical error lies in that up until 2009 all anonymous diagnoses of HIV were also entered into official statistics. This means that a person who went to see a doctor after testing positive for the virus at an anonymous center could have been recorded twice – first anonymously and then with their name and personal identification code recorded. At the height of the epidemic, some people could have even been tested more than 2 times because a positive diagnosis is so devastating it can send people back to take the test again in hopes of a negative result and assurance by the doctor that mistakes had been made before. Of persons with HIV, 42% lived in Ida-Viru County and 39% in Harju County.

== Finland ==
Since 2022, there have been around 250 new HIV diagnoses annually in Finland. The number has increased largely due to foreigner immigration from higher HIV prevalence areas. The number of AIDS deaths has stayed at an annual level of 15–30, year 2015 was the first year with no AIDS deaths in Finland. During 1980–2016, around 3,700 people had been diagnosed with HIV and circa 450 people had died of AIDS. The Finnish Institute for Health and Welfare estimated that there are around 2500 people who carry the virus but are unaware of their infection. This would mean one in five HIV-positive people. Most HIV infections are diagnosed in 30–34-year-olds

== Germany ==
HIV has a typical prevalence to western Europe. Sex between men and drug users are high risk populations. In Germany at the end of 2020 around 91 400 lived with HIV. Around 2000 were newly infected in 2020. 90-90-90-goal: In Germany 90% of HIV-Infected are diagnosed, 97% of those diagnosed are on HIV-medicine, of which 96% have undetectable level of HIV.

== Greece ==
Around 17 000 [14 000 - 19 000] people in Greece live with HIV.

== France ==
Around 5,000 French citizens received a positive HIV diagnosis in 2021, showing no significant change from the numbers reported in 2020.

== Hungary ==
According to the disease and infection control department of the National Health Center of Hungary (NNGYK Járványügyi és Infekciókontroll Főosztály), there were 228 new HIV infections in 2023. At the same time the total number of confirmed infected persons living in Hungary was 3857. Of this 2104 lived in the capital city, Budapest.

Experts believe that the total number of infected people could be around 15 thousand.

== Iceland ==
HIV-1 was first reported in Iceland in 1985. By the end of 2012 a total of 300 patients had been diagnosed with HIV-1 infection in the country, of which 66 had developed AIDS and 39 died as a result of the disease. Following the first introduction of HIV-1 to Iceland onwards to the end of 2012, the infection has been dominated by subtype B with a relatively low fraction of founders compared to the total number of introductions. HIV-1 infection in the country appeared to be highly concentrated among men who have sex with men and injection drug users and less among heterosexuals. The genetic diversity of HIV-1 in Iceland has increased significantly over time, most likely related to the increased proportion of foreign-born residents in the country from the mid-1990s. In the most recent study investigating the prevalence and trends of transmitted drug resistance among antiretroviral-therapy naive patients in Iceland, the prevalence was found to be at moderate level (8.5%), with an evidence of decreasing prevalence of transmitted drug resistance in Iceland during 1996–2012.

== Latvia ==
Around 6100 [5600 - 6600] people in Latvia live with HIV.

Latvia has one the highest HIV infection rates in the European Union. The dominant identified HIV infection pattern in Latvia is heterosexual relations (33% of new cases in 2018), followed by intravenous drug use (22%), followed by homosexual relations (6%). In 37% of new cases the way of infection is unknown.

== Lithuania ==
Around 3700 [3100 - 4300] people in Lithuania live with HIV.

The data regularly show that intravenous drug use is the main HIV infection pattern in the country: in 2017, 51.7% of new HIV cases were observed among drug users. During the same year, 24.3% new infections stemmed from heterosexual relations and 6.8% from homosexual relations.

== Norway ==
Around 5400 [4500 - 6100] people in Norway live with HIV.

== Romania ==
Around 18 000 [16 000 - 20 000] people in Romania live with HIV.

== Russia ==
By 2017 the number of reported cases in Russia was over 1 million, according to the World Health Organization, up from 15,000 in 1995.

The number of people living with HIV in Russia reached more than 1.1 million in June 2021. Over the previous five years, between 85,000 and 100,000 new infections have been reported annually. These are only the officially registered cases; actual HIV infections are believed to be substantially higher.

== Spain ==
Spain has had a high prevalence of HIV/AIDS, but is now on the level with the rest of Western Europe. Spain, the US, France, Germany, Italy, Turkey and the United Kingdom accounted for three quarters of the infected population in the Western region. The first reported cases of AIDS were in 1983. Two hemophiliacs, after receiving blood transfusions from the United States, died in Andalucía of the disease. Later on, it was found that a male patient in 1981 was infected with AIDS after having had sex with other men while he travelled to the United States and Turkey.

In 1997, Spain had 104 cases of AIDS per 100,000 which was triple the European Union average at the time. Spain also accounted for a quarter of the HIV infected population of Western Europe at that time. However, in 2016 Spain had plateaued to a national average that echoed the average adult HIV prevalence in Western Europe & North American at 0.3%. 77% of those infected with HIV in Spain received antiretroviral treatment (ART), which is on par with the rest of Western Europe and North America at 78%. The five demographics that have the highest prevalence of HIV infection are sex workers (2%), injecting drug users (2.3%), prisoners (5.4%), men who have sex with men (11.3%), and transgender people (13.3%).

== Sweden ==
View chart definition.
Number of HIV healthcare patients in Sweden ages 0-85 male & female

From the end of the 1980s to the early 2000s, infection rate in Sweden was about 300 new cases per year, then the rate increased. Today, about 8,000 people with HIV live in Sweden. Approximately 400-500 new cases of HIV are reported each year. The median age for those who were diagnosed with HIV in 2019 in Sweden was 38 years, with a spread between 0–75 years. The majority of the new HIV diagnoses in Sweden consist of cases where the HIV infection has been transmitted before migration to Sweden.

== Switzerland ==
Around 18,000 people in Switzerland are HIV positive.

== United Kingdom ==
In 2020, 106,890 people were living with HIV in the United Kingdom and 614 died (99 of these from COVID-19 comorbidity). Of these, around 4,660 are undiagnosed so do not know they are HIV positive. London continues to have the highest rates of HIV in England: 37% of new diagnoses in 2020 were in London residents.

Prevalence is highest in gay/bisexual men in London. However, the 2017 statistics showed a tremendous decrease in the number of newly HIV infected gay men during 2015–17. The number of newly HIV infected gay men decreased by a third in just two years.

== See also ==
- Epidemiology of HIV/AIDS
- HIV/AIDS in Africa
- HIV/AIDS in Asia
- HIV/AIDS in North America
- HIV/AIDS in South America
