= HIV/AIDS in Brazil =

The Brazilian AIDS program has been internationally recognized as a model for developing countries. The first AIDS case identified in Brazil was in 1982. Infection rates climbed exponentially throughout the 1980s, and in 1990 the World Bank famously predicted 1,200,000 cases by 2000, approximately double the actual number that was later reported by the Brazilian Ministry of Health and most international organizations. The South and Southeast regions account for 75% or more of infections (Rio Grande do Sul, São Paulo and Rio de Janeiro). The Northeast has 33% of the population but only 10% of AIDS cases.

The Brazilian experience is frequently cited as a model for other developing countries facing the AIDS epidemic, including the internationally controversial policies of the Brazilian government such as the universal provision of antiretroviral drugs (ARVs), progressive social policies toward risk groups, and collaboration with non-governmental organizations.

== Prevalence ==
Annual AIDS cases and deaths in Brazil, 2007–2023, with case-fatality rate. The 2020 dip reflects underreporting during the COVID-19 pandemic. Source: Ministério da Saúde, Boletim Epidemiológico HIV e Aids 2024

According to the Brazilian Ministry of Health's 2024 epidemiological bulletin, approximately 38,000 new AIDS cases were reported in Brazil in 2023, with around 10,338 AIDS-related deaths (4.8 per 100,000 inhabitants). Annual case counts remained relatively stable between 2007 and 2019 (approximately 39,000–44,000 per year), before a temporary decline in 2020 attributed to underreporting during the COVID-19 pandemic. AIDS-related mortality in 2023 was 31.8% lower than the 1995 peak of 15,156 deaths.

== Epidemiology ==
=== Demographics ===
Male-to-female ratio of AIDS cases in Brazil, 2007–2023. The ratio rose from 1.5:1 in 2007 to 2.4:1 in 2023, reflecting growing concentration of new infections among men. Source: Ministério da Saúde, Boletim Epidemiológico HIV e Aids 2024.

The male-to-female ratio of AIDS cases has shifted substantially over time. In 2007, there were approximately 1.5 male cases for every female case (M:F ratio 1.5:1). By 2023, this ratio had risen to 2.4:1, reflecting the increasing concentration of new infections among men who have sex with men (MSM).

AIDS cases by race/ethnicity in Brazil, 2013–2023. Mixed-race (parda) surpassed white (branca) as the largest group around 2016, reaching 49% of cases by 2023. Source: Ministério da Saúde, Boletim Epidemiológico HIV e Aids 2024.

The racial and ethnic composition of AIDS cases has also changed markedly. Until approximately 2016, white (branca) Brazilians represented the largest share of recorded cases. From 2016 onward, mixed-race (parda) Brazilians surpassed white Brazilians and have since grown to represent approximately 49% of all cases with race recorded, compared to 35% for white and 12% for Black (preta) Brazilians as of 2023.

=== Geographic distribution ===
AIDS detection rate by state (UF), Brazil, 2023. National average: 17.8/100k. Roraima (51.0) and Amazonas (40.8) had the highest rates. Source: Ministério da Saúde, Boletim Epidemiológico HIV e Aids 2024.

AIDS detection rates vary significantly across Brazilian states. As of 2023, the national average was 17.8 cases per 100,000 inhabitants. The states with the highest detection rates were Roraima (RR, 51.0/100k) and Amazonas (AM, 40.8/100k), both in the North region. Maranhão (MA, 30.8/100k) and Pará (PA, 30.7/100k) also exceeded 30 per 100,000. Notably, São Paulo (SP), which historically accounted for the largest absolute number of cases in Brazil, recorded a below-average rate of 15.7 per 100,000 in 2023, reflecting the effect of its longstanding and well-resourced HIV prevention and treatment infrastructure.

== History ==
Brazil's first AIDS case was reported in 1982. Brazil's AIDS response was crafted in 1985, just after Brazil had returned from military rule to democracy, at a time when only four AIDS cases had been reported. The Brazilian Ministry of Health laid the groundwork for a National AIDS Control Program (NACP) in 1986. In 1987, it was placed under the aegis of the National AIDS Control Committee, a group composed of scientists and members of civil society organizations.

The program was reorganized again in 1992 with more emphasis on linkages between government and NGOs. AIDS Project I garnered $90 million in domestic funds and a $160 million loan from the World Bank between 1992 and 1998. AIDS Project II was funded by both domestic funds and a World Bank loan totalling $370 million between 1998 and 2002.

In 1990—a year when more than 10,000 new cases were reported—the World Bank estimated that Brazil would have 1,200,000 infections by 2000. However, by 2002, there were fewer than 600,000 estimated infections, less than half the prediction.

== Government policies ==
=== Universal ARV provision ===
AIDS-related mortality in Brazil, 1985–2023. Deaths peaked at 15,156 in 1995, declined sharply after universal ART (Law 9313/1996), and reached 10,338 (4.8/100k) in 2023. Source: Ministério da Saúde, Boletim Epidemiológico HIV e Aids 2024.

The single most controversial element of the Brazilian HIV/AIDS response remains the free, universal provision of anti-retroviral drugs (ARVs), including protease inhibitors, starting in December 1996 with Law No. 9313/1996. The guidelines for antiretroviral therapy (ART) are formulated annually by a Support Committee which determines the diagnostic guidelines and the contents of the ARV cocktail. In 2003, 125,000 Brazilians received free ART treatment, accounting for 100% of the total registered AIDS cases but only 20% of the estimated AIDS cases.

ART was traditionally considered too expensive in resource-poor settings in developing countries, which are believed to have a poor capacity for adherence to complicated treatments. However, a 2004 study of 322 outpatient services in Brazil—comprising 87,000 patients—found the rate of adherence to be 75%. Some authors also argue that if the decline in hospital admissions and ambulatory care are taken into account, the policy of universal provision of ART has accumulated a net savings of approximately $200 million.

In the context of Brazil, some have challenged the degree to which improvements in public health can be attributed to ART as opposed to other factors. For example, a 2002 World Bank Policy Research Working Paper states:

The impact caused by the introduction of therapeutic measures, like the antiretrovirals in their different compositions and associations and/or health promotion and protection measured, though evident, has not been completely explored yet.

A 2003 study, using data from diagnoses occurring in Brazil in 1995 and 1996, found that antiretroviral treatment was the single greatest predictor of survival. The authors demonstrate that variables like year of diagnosis, higher education, sexual exposure category, gender, the presence of specific pathogens all appeared to predict survival in a univariate analysis; however, in a multivariate analysis only antiretroviral treatment, diagnostic criteria, and transmission category remained significant. The authors conclude that no factor other than ART "could reasonably explain the very large increase in survival observed" between the 1980s and 1996.

=== Test and Treat policy ===
In 2013, Brazil adopted a "Test and Treat" (Testar e Tratar) policy, under which all people diagnosed with HIV, regardless of CD4 count or clinical stage, became eligible for immediate antiretroviral therapy through the public health system (SUS). This represented a significant expansion of the 1996 universal ART framework and aligns with the WHO 2013 guidelines and the UNAIDS 90-90-90 targets. AIDS-related mortality, which had reached a secondary plateau of approximately 12,000–12,500 deaths per year between 2010 and 2015, resumed a downward trend following implementation, reaching 10,338 deaths in 2023.

=== Pre-Exposure Prophylaxis ===
Brazil became one of the first low- and middle-income countries to offer pre-exposure prophylaxis (PrEP) through the public health system. Since 2017, tenofovir/emtricitabine (TDF/FTC) has been available free of charge through the SUS to individuals at substantial risk of HIV acquisition, including MSM, transgender women, sex workers, and serodiscordant couples. The Brazilian PrEP program is among the largest in Latin America by coverage.

=== Social policies ===
Brazil's response has been characterized by reaching out to groups which account for a high percentage of AIDS transmission, including relationships with non-governmental organizations. For example, in contrast to many parts of the world, condoms were prioritized early and aggressively. Condom use in first sexual intercourse increased from 4% in 1986 to 48% in 1999 and to 55% in 2003, spurred by government programs to increase awareness, decrease the price, and increase the availability of condoms.

Prostitute groups were involved in the distribution of information materials and condoms. Similarly, needle exchange programs were implemented. The prevalence of HIV among injecting drug users (IDUs) fell from 52% in 1999 to 41.5% in 2001. 12 needle exchange programs were implemented between 1994 and 1998; 40 had been implemented by 2000, distributing 1,500,000 syringes in just a year. HIV prevalence among IDU decreased even more dramatically in some cities.

In 1988 comprehensive screening tests were implemented nationwide in blood banks, following a similar program in São Paulo in 1986. The results of these programs were not realized fully until 2000 as a result of the incubation period of the virus, but new cases from blood transfusion became virtually non-existent at that time and new and more effective nucleic acid testing is being considered. Mother-to-child transmission was similarly practically eradicated, falling to a transmission rate of 3%, a level comparable to most developed countries, with the implementation of zidovudine treatment regimes to mother and child and recommendations against breastfeeding.

== International conflict ==
=== Drug patents ===
The average annual cost of ART per patient in 1997 was $4,469—compared to over $10,000 in most of the developed world—totaling only $242 million per annum. However, in 2001, Brazil manufactured locally 8 of the 12 drugs in the national ARV cocktail; in 2003 and 2005, 8 of the 15. If all of the drugs were patented imports, the cost of these ARV programs would increase by 32%. Between 1996 and 2000, Brazil reduced treatment costs by 72.5% through import substitution. By contrast, the price of imports dropped by only 9.6%. Brazil has saved over US$1.1 billion in the cost of providing universal access to ART by producing anti-retroviral medications generically.

Article 71 of the 1997 Brazilian patent law requires that foreign products be manufactured in Brazil within three years of receiving a patent. If a foreign company does not comply, Brazil may authorize a local company to produce the drug without the consent of the patent holder, a tactic known as "compulsory licensing" or the "bargaining chip and as a last resort." In addition, Article 68 authorizes "parallel importing" from the lowest international generic bidder, effectively destroying the patent holder's monopoly as well.

Prodded by domestic pharmaceutical lobbies, the U.S. challenged Article 68 within the framework of the World Trade Organization's Agreement on Trade-Related Aspects of Intellectual Property Rights (TRIPs) regime for allegedly discriminating against imported products; Article 71—to the chagrin of many companies—was not included in the complaint. In addition, the U.S. placed Brazil on the "Special 301" watch list, opening the possibility for "unilateral sanctions," and companies individually threatened to pull out of the Brazilian market altogether.

Brazil argued that the law only applied to cases where the patent holder abuses their economic power, a loophole specifically allowed by the TRIPS agreement. Advocates of intellectual property rights (IPR) worldwide condemned the actions of the Brazilian government. For example, Slavi Pachovski, a member of the Institute for Trade, Standards and Sustainable Development, argues:

If this trend proceeds, it will be a global pandemic of AIDS that will grow uncontrollable because the Brazilian move will destroy the whole legal order that is the basis for developing new drugs and continuing research.

The pharmaceutical companies were not just afraid of the immediate loss of the Brazilian market, but with the larger implications of other developing countries following Brazil's example. Large developing countries, like India, with large industrial capacities and evolving intellectual property regimes are the true elephant in the room.

Brazil invoked the Article 71 for the first time on August 22, 2001, when José Serra, Brazil's Minister of Health, authorized Far Manguinhos—a Brazilian pharmaceutical company—to produce Nelfinavir, a drug patented by Pfizer but licensed to Roche in the Brazilian market. This unilateral action prompted a flurry of negotiations where Roche and Merck agreed to reduce the prices of five drugs by 40-65%. An advertisement distributed by the Brazilian government proclaimed: "Local manufacturing of many of the drugs used in the anti-AIDS cocktail is not a declaration of war against the drugs industry. It is simply a fight for life."

Brazil carried out such a compulsory licensing threat for the first time in May 2007, on efavirenz, an antiretroviral drug produced by Merck.

The agreements signed on November 14, 2001, at the WTO conference in Qatar reaffirmed that TRIPs "does not and should not prevent Members from taking measures to protect public health" including "medicines for all." That same year, the United Nations Commission on Human Rights affirmed access to AIDS drugs as a human right unanimously, with the exception of the abstention of the United States.

=== Prostitution ===
Two 2003 United States laws—one related to AIDS, the other to sex trafficking—required all recipients of U.S. assistance to sign a pledge denouncing prostitution, even if U.S. funds are not used for projects directly related to prostitution. In 2005, Brazil wrote to the United States Agency for International Development (USAID) declining to condemn prostitution, effectively rejecting the remainder of a grant for $48 million between 2003 and 2006. In 2006, USAID officially declared Brazil ineligible to renew the AIDS prevention grant because Brazil would not condemn prostitution as "dehumanizing and degrading."

Brazil considered its partnerships with prostitutes—in distributing contraceptives, educating the public about the disease, and voluntary testing—critical to its overall AIDS prevention strategy. One Ministry of Health pamphlet depicts a character, "Maria Sem Vergonha" (Portuguese for "Maria that knows No Shame", but also a pun on the Brazilian name of the flowering genera Impatiens spp., maria-sem-vergonha), a scantily-clad sex worker who encourages prostitutes to take pride in their work and use condoms.

Pedro Chequer, director of Brazil's National AIDS Control Programme, was quoted as saying "we can't control [the disease] with principles that are Manichaean, theological, fundamentalist and Shiite" and "sex workers are part of implementing our AIDS policy and deciding how to promote it. They are our partners. How could we ask prostitutes to take a position against themselves?" Despite the fact that Brazil has the largest population of Roman Catholics in the world, the Brazilian Roman Catholic Church has not demanded the abstinence-only prevention strategies, voicing only intermittent "mild complaints" about government programs which refuse to acknowledge moral or religious issues.

== A "Brazilian model" ==
Brazil's Health Minister, José Serra, said in 2001, "Our example could serve as a model for other countries in Latin America, the Caribbean, even Africa. Everyone in the world has the right to access these therapies." Some scholars, such as Levi and Vitória, argue that the Brazilian model can only be applied to other countries with similar level of economic development and civil society sectors. Galvão argues that the unique local conditions in Brazil complicate the application of the Brazilian experience to other regions with their own local problems and structures.

A Washington Post article stated that the Brazilian anti-AIDS program is considered by the United Nations to be the most successful in the developing world, and The Economist echoed this position: "no developing country has had more success in tackling AIDS than Brazil."

== See also ==
- HIV/AIDS in South America
- LGBT healthcare in Brazil
