= HIV/AIDS in Uruguay =

The presence of HIV/AIDS in Uruguay is an ongoing health concern for the population of that South American nation.

== Prevalence ==
According to Unaids statistics, there were 15,000 confirmed cases of the disease in Uruguay in 2021. Of those, 14,000 patients were over the age of 15. Among people older than 15 with HIV or the AIDS syndrome associated with the HIV disease, 8,600 patients were male and 5,800 female. 0.6 percent of Uruguay's population aged 15 to 49 were affected, with percentages of 0.7 for males and 0.5 for females in the same age category, respectively.

As in most of the Spanish-speaking world, HIV and AIDS are known as VIH and SIDA in Uruguay.

== History ==
Initially, HIV/AIDS spread quickly in Uruguay: by August 1988, there were 422 confirmed HIV cases in the country, of which 73 had progressed to full-blown AIDS. Of the latter 73, 39 had been reported as deceased. 86.5% of the then-reported cases were males at that time.

According to the Uruguayan government, across social and economic levels, the percentages of people affected with HIV in Uruguay range between 1% and 5% of the population. Between 2016 and 2020, there were an average of 902 new cases reported per year. (info on Spanish-language PDF included on this link)

== Government response ==
=== Dia nacional del VIH/SIDA ===
The Uruguayan government has designated July 29 as HIV/AIDS national day (Dia nacional del VIH/SIDA) in Uruguay to commemorate those who have died from the virus and disease and those suffering from them.

That particular date also commemorates the first time that the presence of HIV and AIDS were detected in Uruguay, when, on July 29, 1983, a person who had recently arrived in the country from the United States was diagnosed.
