= HIV/AIDS in Argentina =

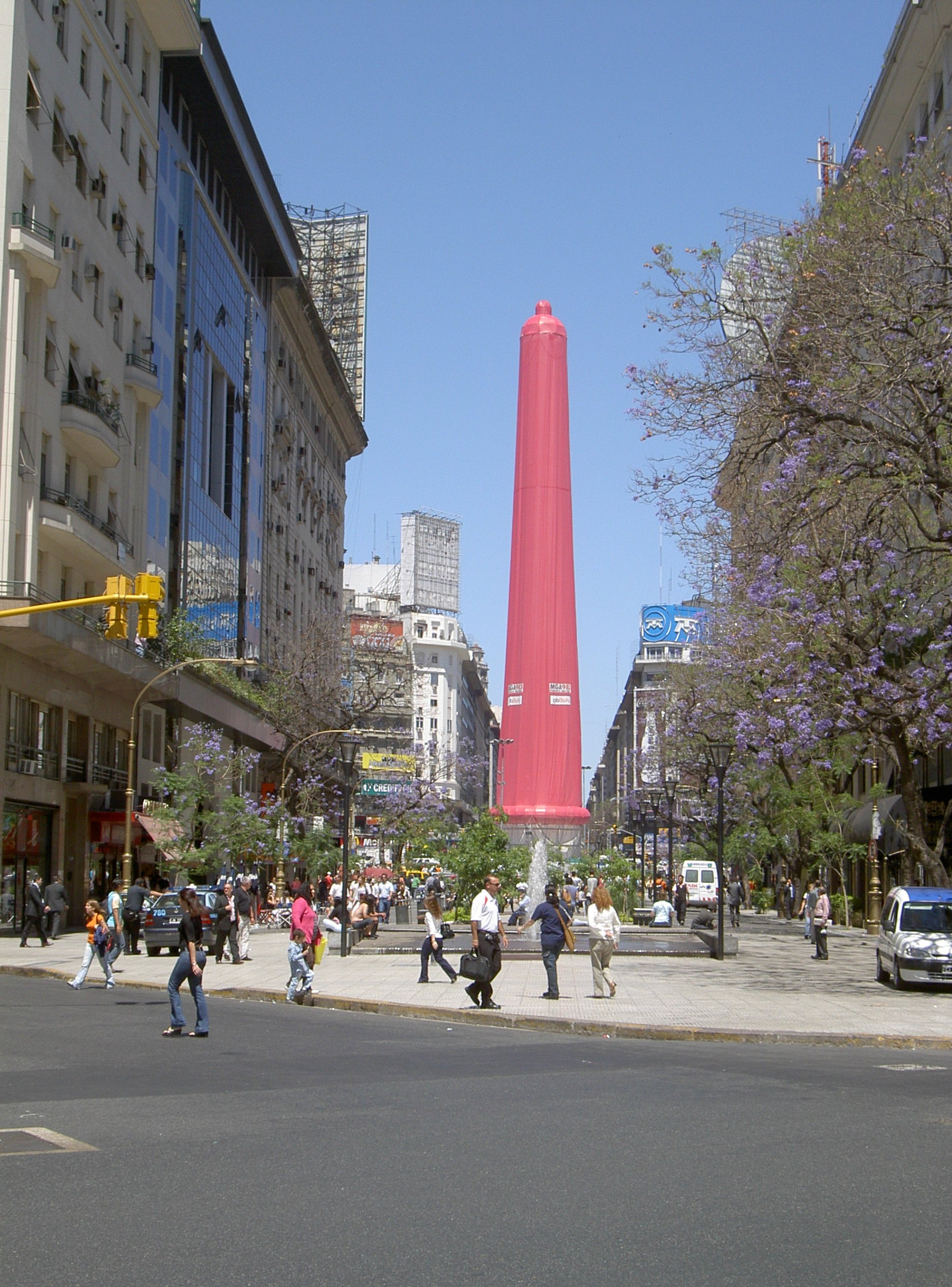
A condom 67 m long covering the Obelisco de Buenos Aires, commemorating World AIDS Day in 2005.

HIV/AIDS in Argentina was considered a concentrated epidemic by 2012.

== Prevalence ==
In 2019, UNAIDS estimates placed the number of people living with HIV at about 140,000.

In 2010, the prevalence of human immunodeficiency virus (HIV) in the general population was less than 1%. In some groups the percentage was 6%, while in others there is a major incidence. Considering the whole country, 70% of cases are concentrated in the provinces of Buenos Aires, Santa Fe, Córdoba and the Autonomous City of Buenos Aires.

== History ==
In 1982 the first patient with AIDS was reported in Argentina. Since 1982, the Ministry of Health has kept records of cases. Until mid-2000, more than 17,000 patients (12,732 men, 3,074 women and 1,214 children under 15 years) were reported.

In 1987, it was reported the first case of a woman infected with HIV.

In 2012, 5,500 new HIV cases were being reported in Argentina every year. 90% of them acquired the virus by having sex without a condom.

In 2012, there were about 110,000 people infected with HIV in Argentina, of whom only 50% knew their status. Of these, 47,000 were under treatment, 69% in the public service and the rest covered by private health insurance plans.

== See also ==
- HIV/AIDS in South America
- Health in Argentina
