= Corral Quemado =

Corral Quemado (lit. "Burned Pen") may refer to the following places:

- Corral Quemado, Catamarca, village in Catamarca Province, Argentina
- Corral Quemado, Córdoba, village in Córdoba Province, Argentina
- Puerta de Corral Quemado, village in Catamarca Province, Argentina
- Corral Quemado, Chile, locality in Santiago Province, Chile
- Corral Quemado mine, a manganese mine in Coquimbo Region, Chile
