= Ascochinga =

- Town
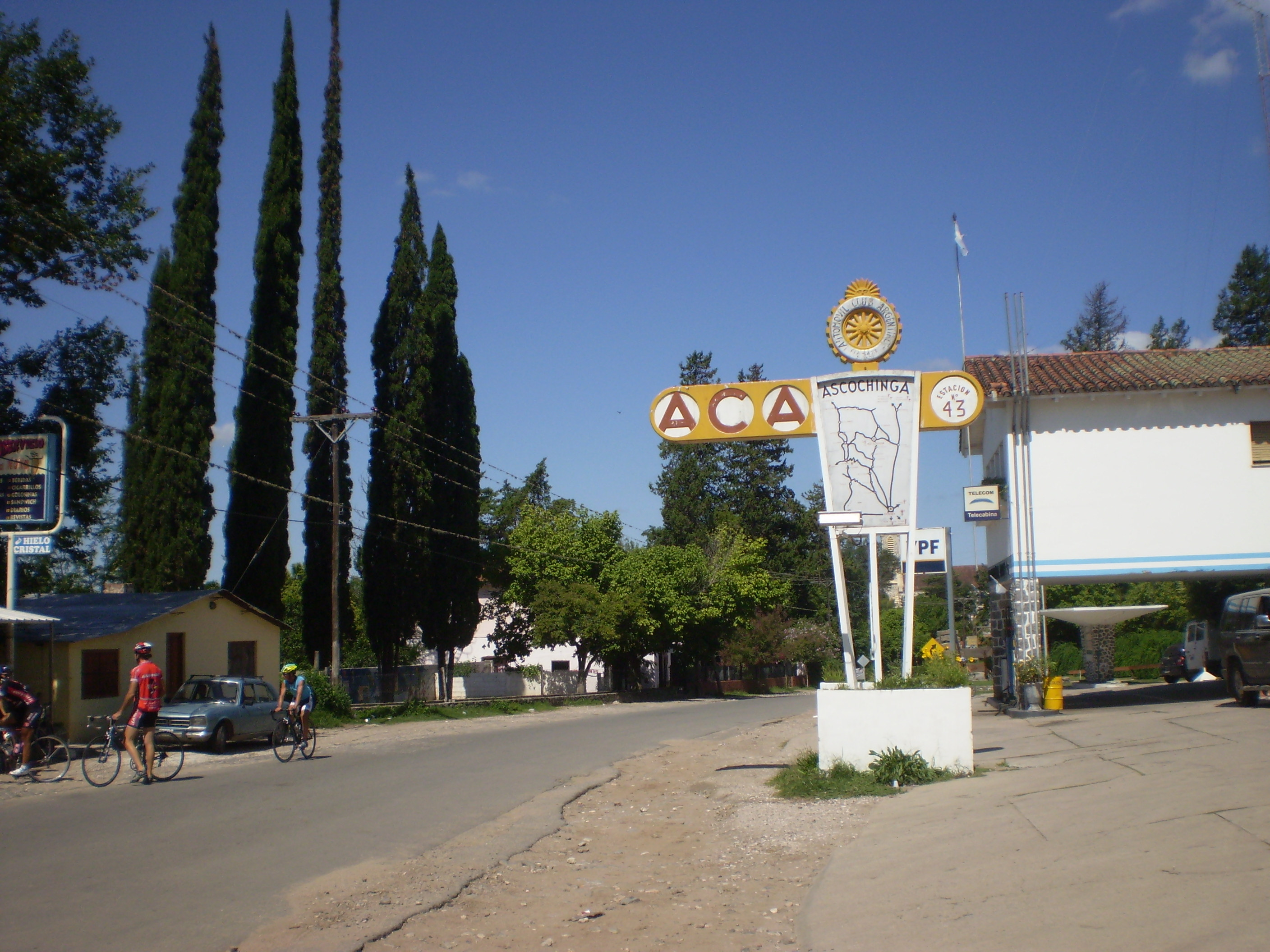
- Argentine Automobile Club in Ascochinga

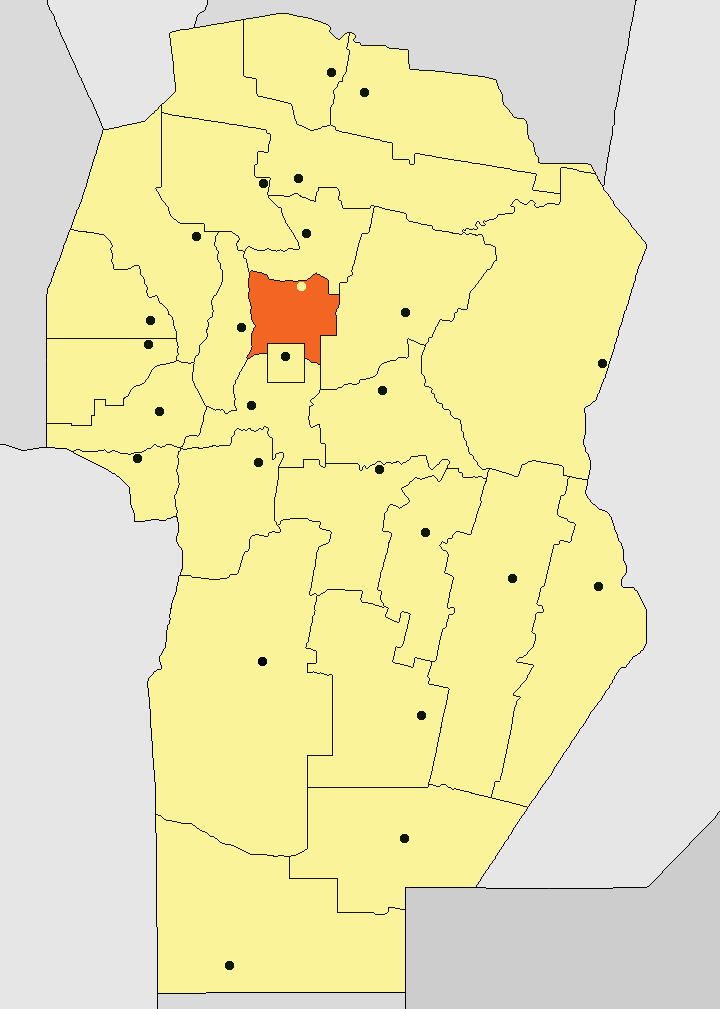
- Colón Department in Córdoba Province

- Location of Ascochinga in Argentina
- Coordinates: 30°57′33″S 64°16′26″W
- Country: Argentina
- Province: Córdoba
- Department: Colón
- Elevation: 710 m (2,330 ft)

Population (2001)
  - Total: 470
- Time zone: UTC−3 (ART)
- CPA base: X5117
- Dialing code: +54 3525

Ascochinga is a town in Colón Department, in Córdoba Province, Argentina.

It is situated in the eastern end of the Sierras Chicas, around 59 kilometers (37 mi) from the provincial capital.

== Geography ==
Ascochinga is connected to the rest of the province by two paved roads, Provincial Route E53, towards the south to the city of Córdoba and Provincial Route E66 towards the north-east, towards the departmental capital of Jesús María which is located around 19 km to the east.

The unpaved part of the provincial road E66, also called Camino del Pungo, leads over the mountains and connects the town with La Cumbre on the other side of the Sierras Chicas.

The Ascochinga river flows through the town. The town borders on the Natural reserve Reserva Natural de la Defensa Ascochinga, which was created in 2014 by the Argentine ministry of defense, covers around 3500 hectares and is home to native wild life, including pumas, South-American foxes and condors.

== Name ==
The name Ascochinga is presumed to be of indigenous origin and to mean "lost dog".

== History ==
The town was founded in the 18th century as a strategic point on the region's commercial and livestock routes. During the 19th century, it grew due to the railway, which boosted its development and connectivity.

From the 19th Century on, Ascochinga was a tourism destination for the upper class. Argentine president Julio Argentino Roca spent the last years of his life on the La Paz estancia, while former presidents Domingo Sarmiento, Nicolás Avellaneda and Carlos Pellegrini also spent time on the jesuit Santa Catalina estancia.

In 1941, John F. Kennedy stayed in Ascochinga, celebrating his 24th birthday there, after his father Joseph Kennedy - then ambassador to the UK - met Miguel Ángel Cárcano who was the Argentine ambassador to France during the inauguration of Pope Pius XII, leading to the families becoming friends. In the local church, Sagrado Corazón, a plaque honors Kennedy's attendance of the local mass. After the assassination of Kennedy, his wife Jackie visited in 1966.

In 1975, Isabel Perón spent a recuperative break for her health, while the presidency was delegated to Italo Argentino Luder, in a vacation colony of the Argentine Air Force in Ascochinga. She was joined by Alicia Hartridge de Videla and Delia Viera de Massera, the wives of Jorge Rafael Videla and Emilio Eduardo Massera who were responsible for the civil-military coup d'état of 1976.

In 1976, the forces of the Argentine dictatorship moved eight prisoners from the secret detention center La Perla to Ascochinga and executed them there. On June 1, 2026, the town of La Granja, to which Ascochinga administratively belongs, held an event to commemorate the 50th anniversary of the massacre. The event also served as a memorial for Gustavo Daniel Torres, who had been disappeared to the La Perla secret prison by the military dictatorship in 1976 at age 16, and whose body had been identified in May 2026.

Until today, the town hosts a vacation resort for the Argentine Air Force that includes a golf course.

== Infrastructure ==
Due to the Air Force connection, it has a small airport (Ascochinga Airport (ICAO: SACN)) 3 km (2 mi) from the town.

The area has been used as a special stage for Rally Argentina.
