= Benito Montalvo =

Argentine football coach (born 1985)

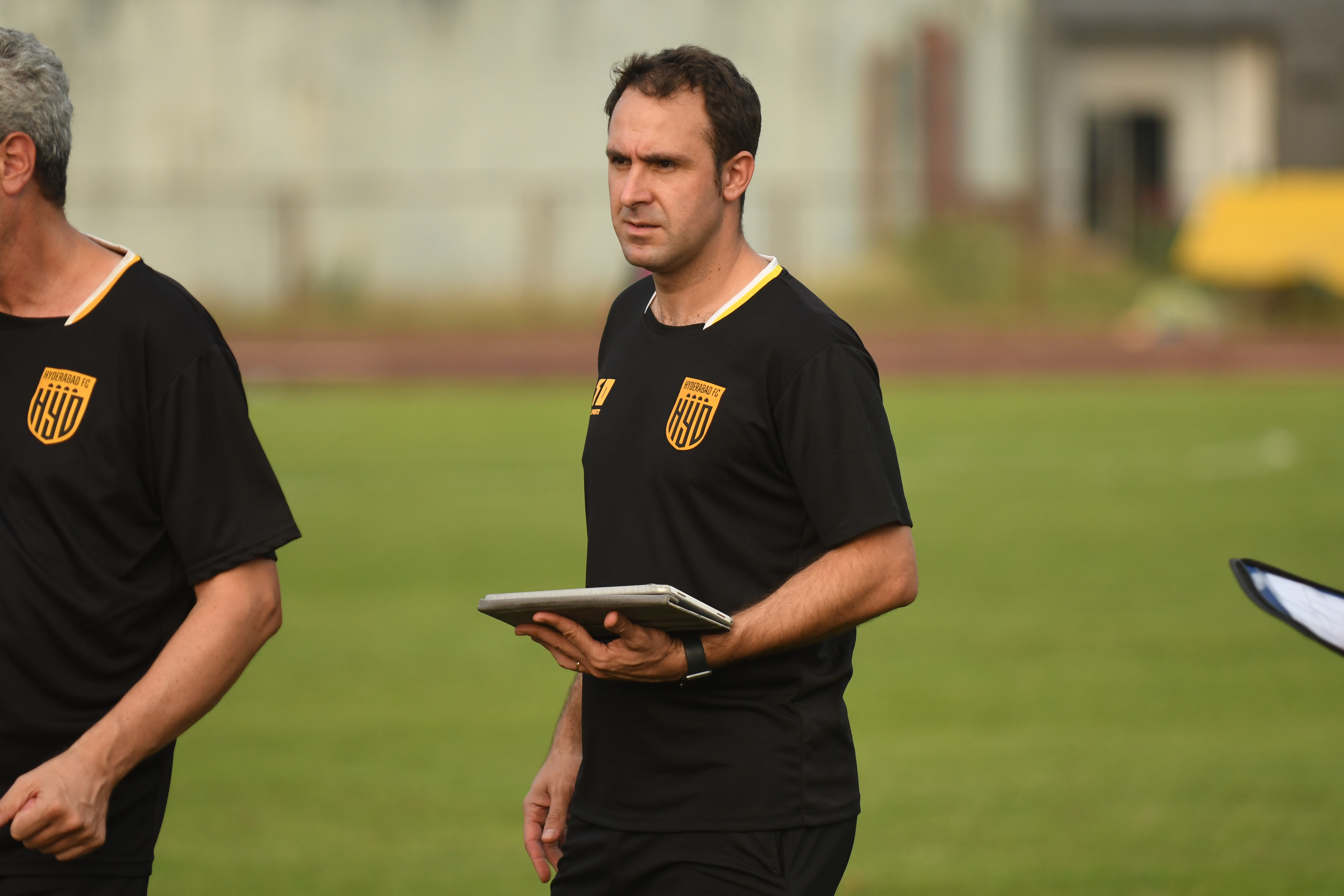
- Montalvo with Hyderabad in January 2021

Personal information
- Full name: Benito Félix Montalvo
- Date of birth: 19 September 1985 (age 41)
- Place of birth: Unquillo, Argentina
- Height: 1.81 m (5 ft 11 in)
- Position: Midfielder

Team information
- Current team: India (assistant)

Senior career*
Years	Team	Apps	(Gls)
2005−2008	Instituto Atlético Central Córdoba	18	(1)
2008−2009	Central Córdoba	13	(1)
2009−2010	Instituto Atlético Central Córdoba	15	(1)
2010−2011	Tacuary	11	(1)
2011−2012	Deportivo Capiata	12	(1)
2012-2013	Cerro Porteño Pdte Franco	5	(0)
2012−2014	FC Jūrmala	36	(5)
2015	Bhayangkara	0	(0)
2015−2016	Ciudad de Ibiza	10	(0)
2016−2017	Vilassar de Mar	12	(0)

Managerial career
- 2020–2023: Hyderabad (assistant)
- 2023–2026: Goa (assistant)
- 2024−2025: India (assistant)
- * Club domestic league appearances and goals as of 31 January 2020 (UTC)

Benito Montalvo (born 19 September 1985 in Unquillo) is an Argentine UEFA Pro licensed football coach. He worked at the Marcet Foundation as a coach, analyst and sport director. He is currently senior coach and head of methodology at Meistriliiga club FCI Levadia's academy.

== Coaching career ==
Following his retirement as a player in 2017, Benito received training as a coach, analyst and sports director in Barcelona and has also been the head coach of Espanyol Academy Helsinki. During training camps in Finland and Sweden during the COVID-19 pandemic, Benito met Spaniard Manolo Márquez. Benito's first coaching job was as an assistant coach for Marquez in 2020, at Indian Super League club Hyderabad.

With Hyderabad, Benito won his first trophy as a coach, with the club beating Kerala Blasters in the 2021–22 ISL Cup Final. This ISL Cup triumph was also the first trophy in Hyderabad's history.

In 2023, Marquez left Hyderabad to join fellow ISL club Goa. Benito was also subsequently hired by the club as his assistant.

After a season with the Goan club, Marquez was hired to coach the Indian national team in 2024. As per his contract, he would see out his contract for the 2024–25 season with Goa while also being coach of the national team. Benito was hired by the AIFF as Marquez's assistant manager; similar to Marquez, he would retain his position as Goa's assistant manager until the end of the season.
