= Agua de Oro =

- Village
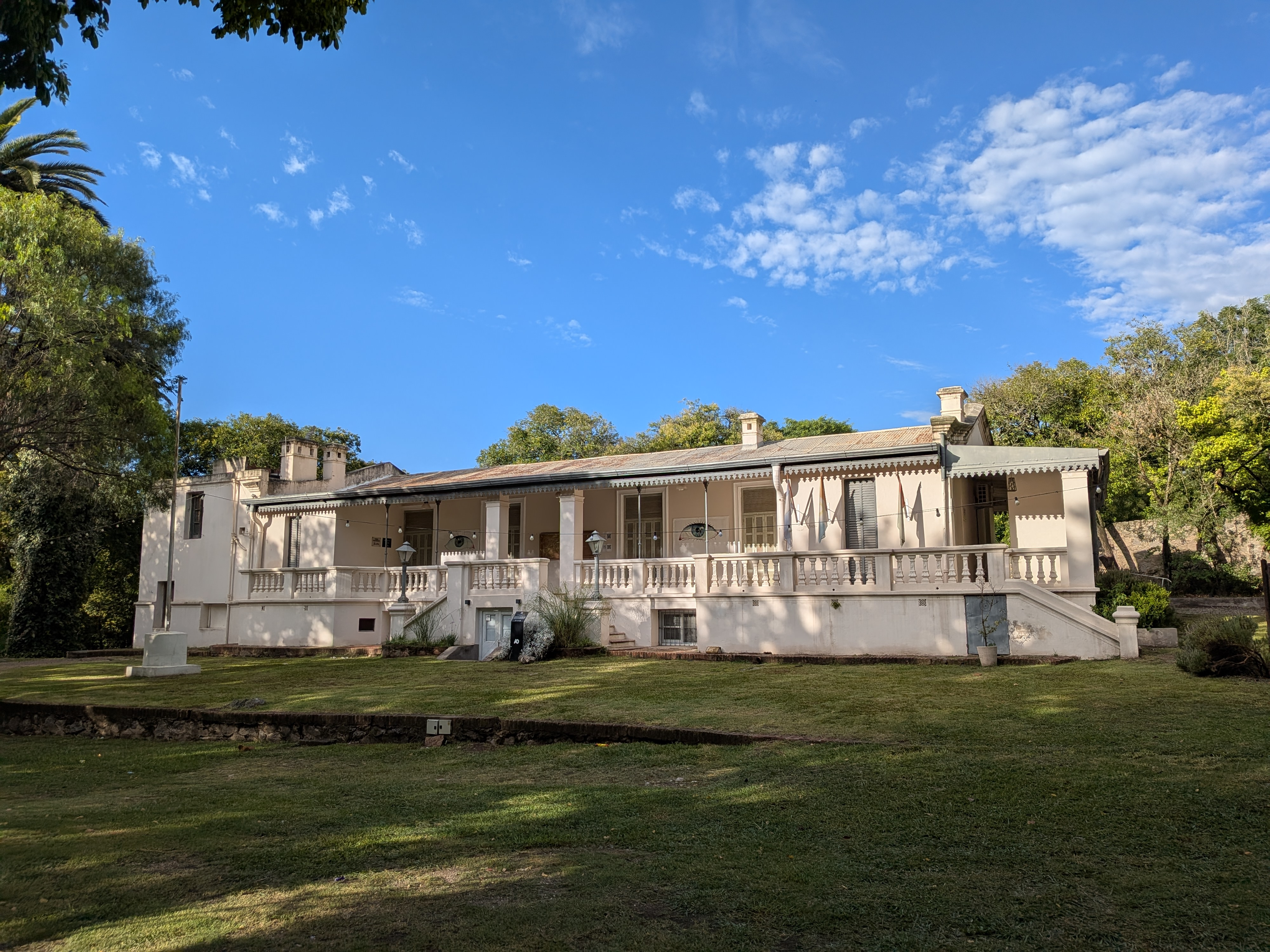
- The historic manor house, Casona Ismeria, close to the center of the village.

- Flag

- Location of Agua de Oro in Argentina
- Coordinates: 31°04′00″S 64°18′00″W
- Country: Argentina
- Province: Córdoba
- Department: Colón

Government
  - Intendant: Miguel Aguirre (PJ)
- Elevation: 791 m (2,595 ft)

Population (2022)
  - Total: 3,242
- Time zone: UTC−3 (ART)
- CPA base: X5107
- Dialing code: 03525
- Website: aguadeoro.gob.ar

Agua de Oro is a town in the Colón Department in the Province of Córdoba in central Argentina, north of the provincial capital Córdoba and is located on the eastern slopes of the Sierras Chicas. The town is a frequent inner-Argentine holiday destination, particularly during the summer months, and the town offers various tourist accommodations and restaurants.

== Geography ==
Agua de Oro is located around 50 kilometers north of the city of Córdoba, flanked by the neighboring towns of Salsipuedes to the south and La Granja to the north. It sits at around 800 meters above sea level, and is crossed in a north-south direction by the provincial road E53, which connects the city of Jesus Maria with Córdoba. The secondary provincial road RPS154 furthermore connects the town with La Cumbre, on the other side of the Sierras Chicas.

The town is crossed from west to east by the Chavascate River, which is one of the principal tourist attractions. There are concerns that mining and quarrying in the area will negatively affect the Chavascate's river basin, and researchers of the National University of Córdoba and local environmental activists have started a citizen science effort to measure the influx of organic material. In 2026, residents of Agua de Oro started a petition with concerns regarding the mining activity upstream of the town. In May of the same year, mayor Miguel Aguirre responded in a written statement, clarifying that the concerned mining activity is happening outside of the jurisdiction of the municipality, while indicating that the municipality would seek to work with provincial authorities regarding the concerns and explores options to manage the quarry-related truck traffic.

The municipal radius extends for approximately 157 square km, including both urban and rural areas. In 2026, the city limits are in the process of being re-defined.

== Population ==
The town has experienced as substantial growth in the past 30 years. According to national census (INDEC) data, the town had 923 in 1991, growing to 1,553 by 2001. By the census of 2022, this number grew to 3,242.

== Infrastructure ==
The town runs its own free clinic or health center, including programs for sexual health, which is financed by the municipality, as well as a provincial support facility for addictions.

Agua de Oro also has a number of schools, including the Centro Educativo Victor Mercante Nivel Inicial and two primary schools — the Escuela Victor Mercante and Escuela 9 de Julio. Furthermore, it also is home to two secondary schools, I.P.E.M. (Instituto Provincial Educación Media) N° 387 Sotero Eugenio Bartolome and the annex to I.P.E.M. Nº 367 in the El Algodonal neighborhood.

In mid-2026, the town ran its first participatory budget, in which up to $15 million argentine peso are being distributed to different projects based on the direct vote by the inhabitants.

== Locality ==
In the nearby hamlet of Villa Cerro Azul, 2.5 km west of Agua de Oro, an archeological site of the Comechingones is found. In December 2024, the municipality created a 22 hectare big municipal natural reserve for the protection of groundwater. The town celebrates the carnival season with a local parade.

Two local media outlets cover the town: Agua de Oro Noticias regularly publishes news articles about the town and neighboring cities and villages on its own website as well as through social media channels, while La Unión Regional is a monthly magazine that appears in print and online, covering the general region including Agua de Oro.

The patron of the town is Our Lady of Lourdes. The town has a grotto for her and she is celebrated on every February 11. In the "Parque Tres Cóndores" neighborhood, there is also a grotto to Our Lady of the Rosary, the patron of the province of Córdoba.

In August 2020, the city announced its new municipal flag which was sourced via a public competition.

== Gallery ==
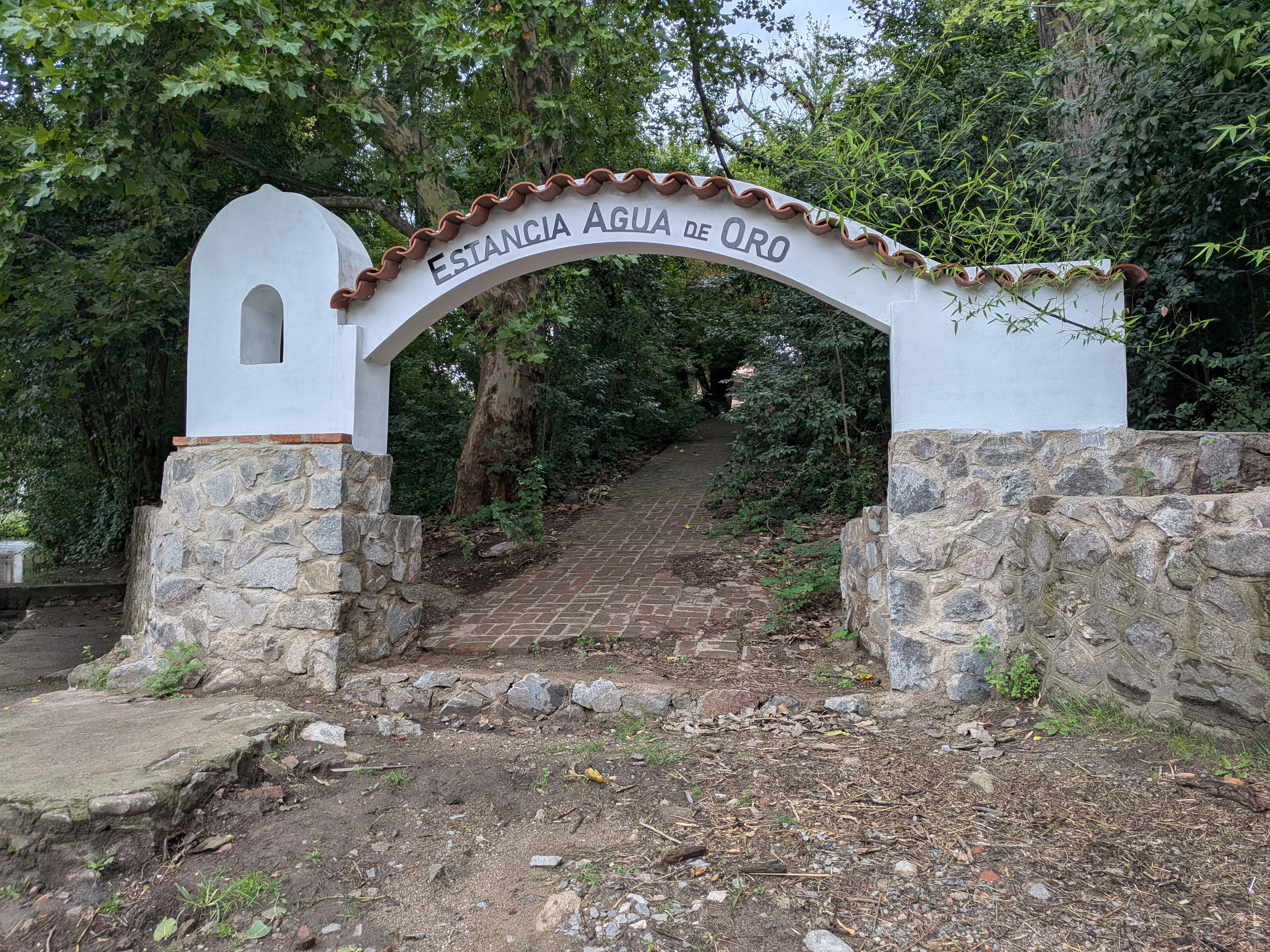
The gate to the Estancia that started Agua de Oro, after it was rebuilt in 2025

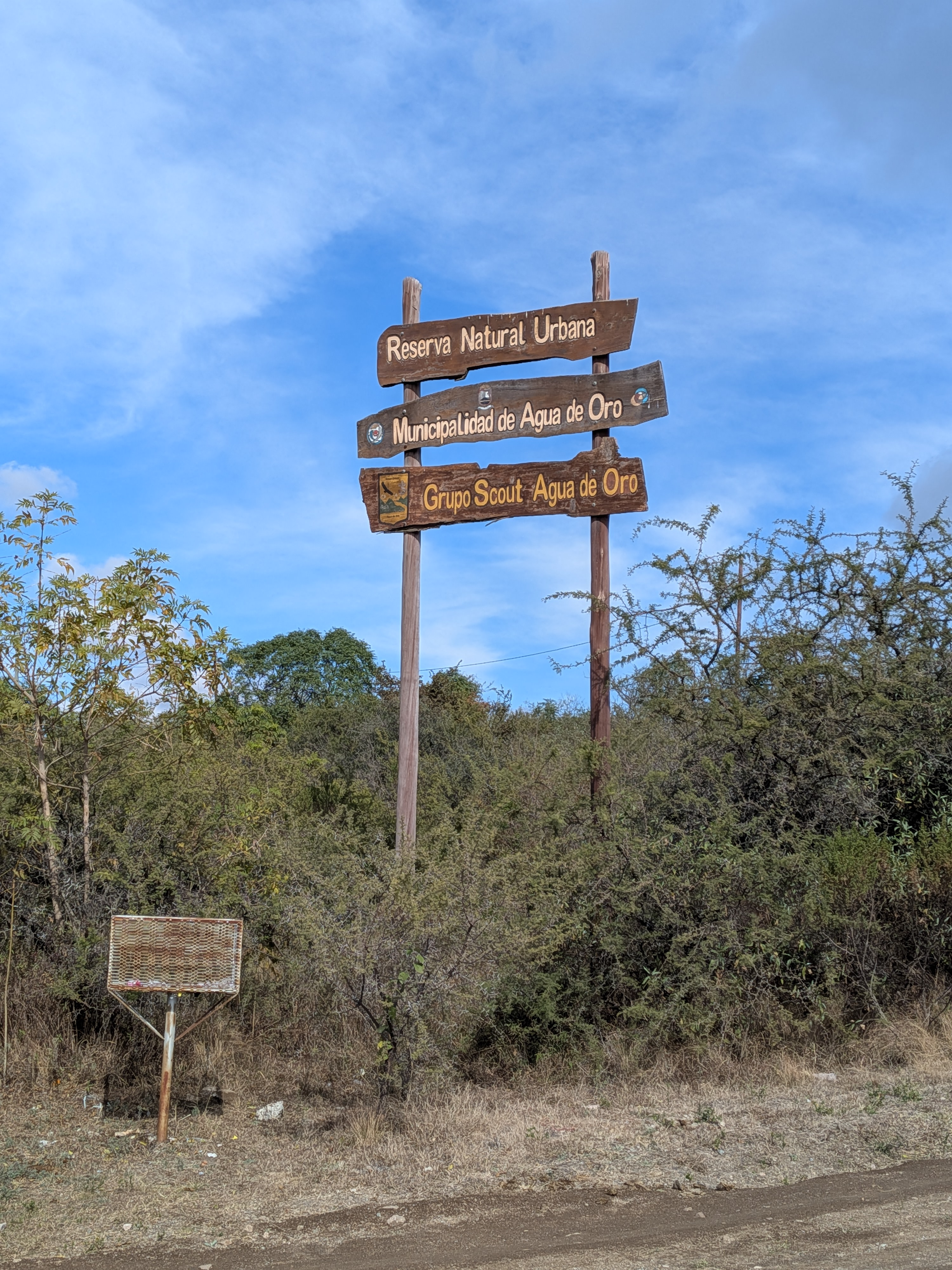
Sign at the entrance to the urban natural reserve in Agua de Oro, Córdoba, Argentina

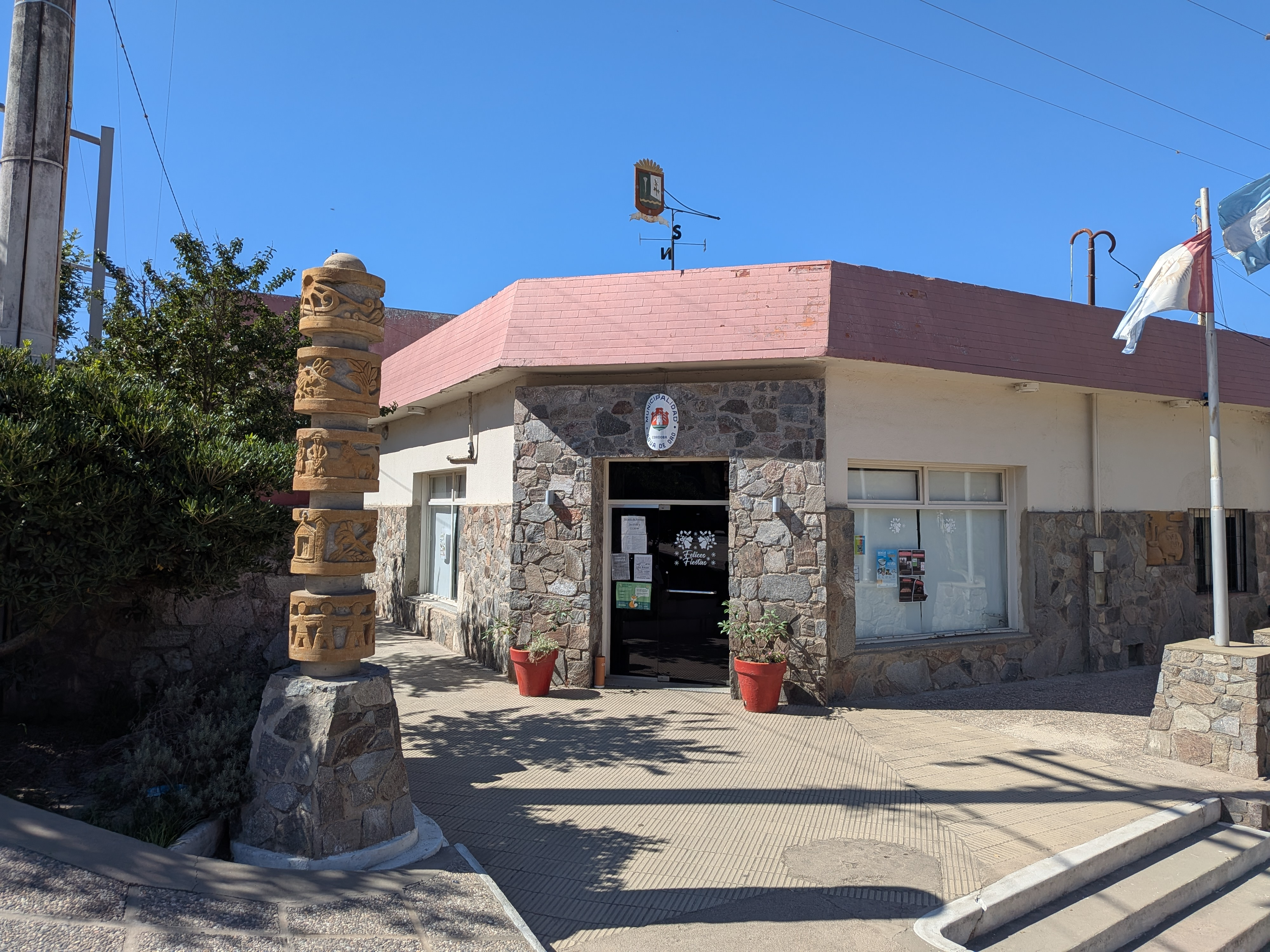
The offices of the municipality in the center of town.

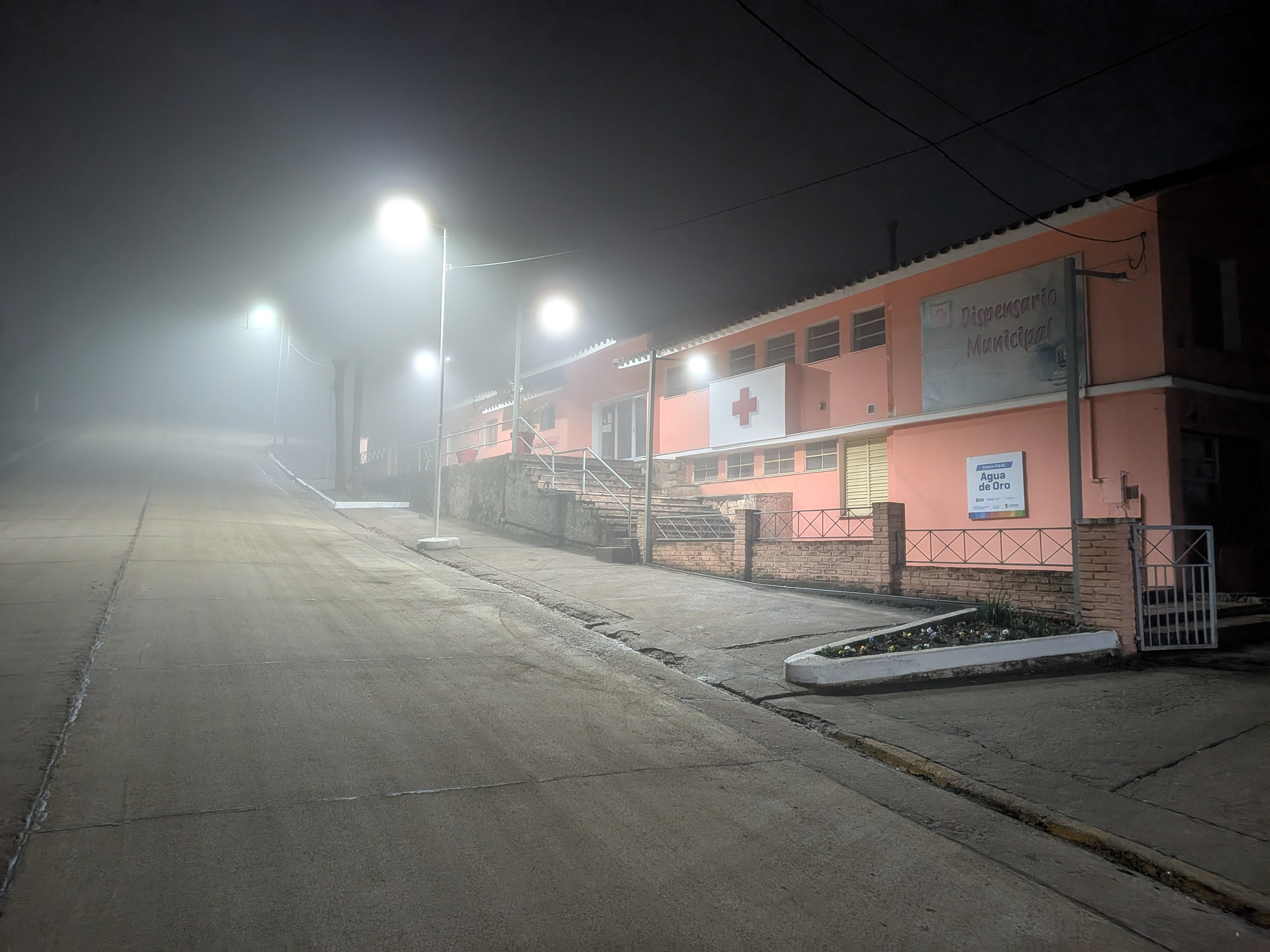
The local clinic in Agua de Oro

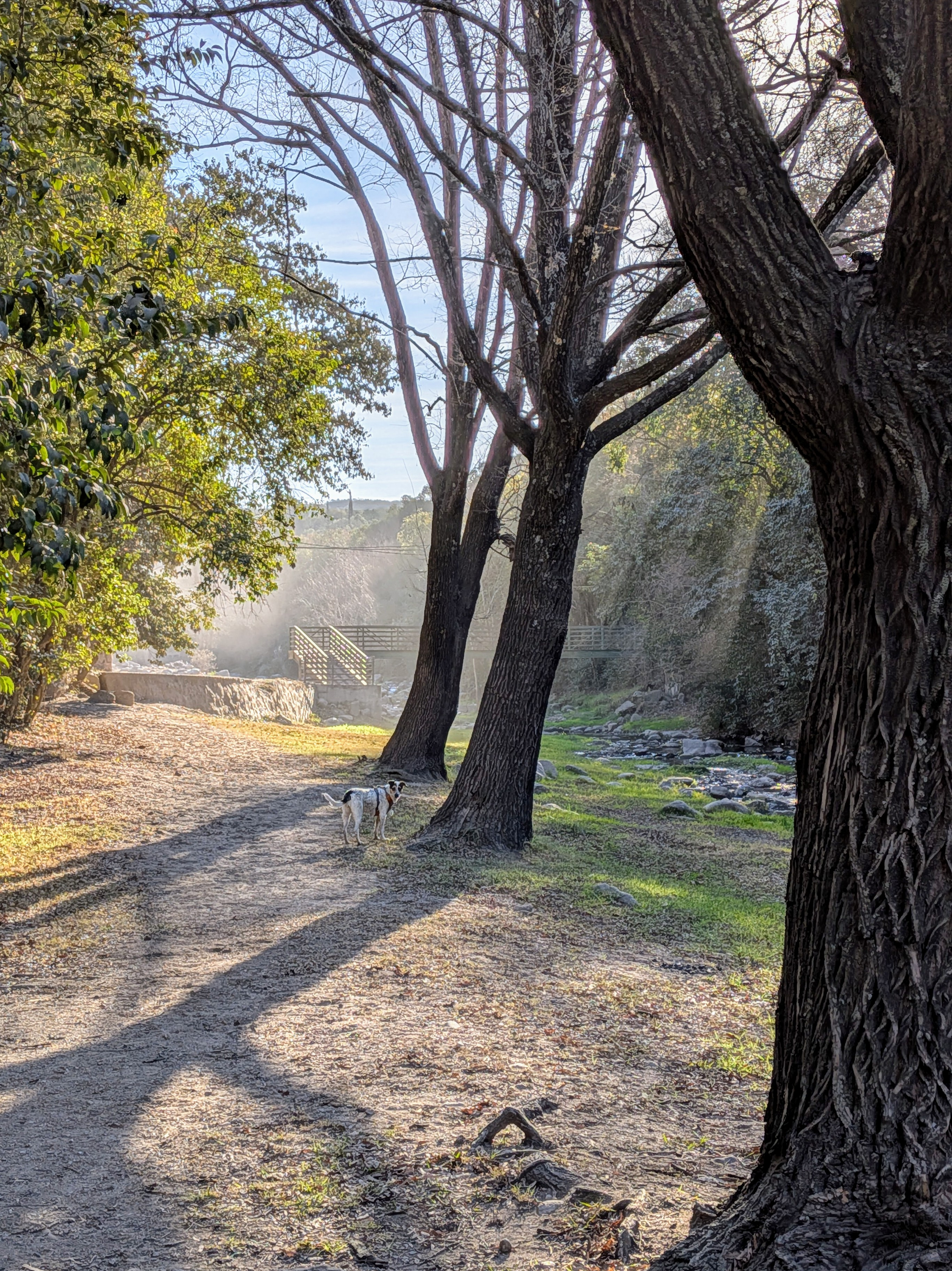
The Río Chavascate in Agua de Oro, Argentina

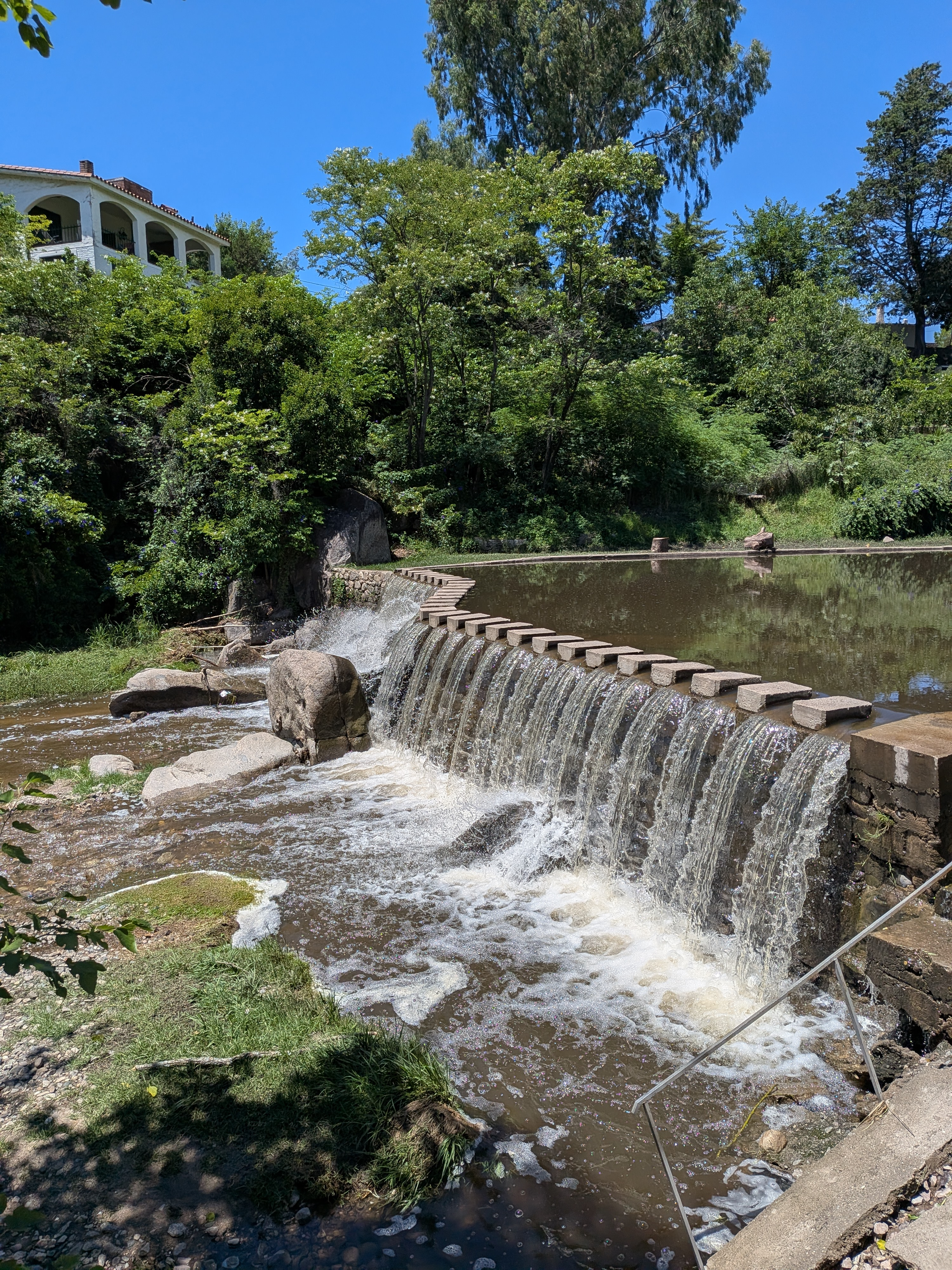
A pool on the Chavascate river

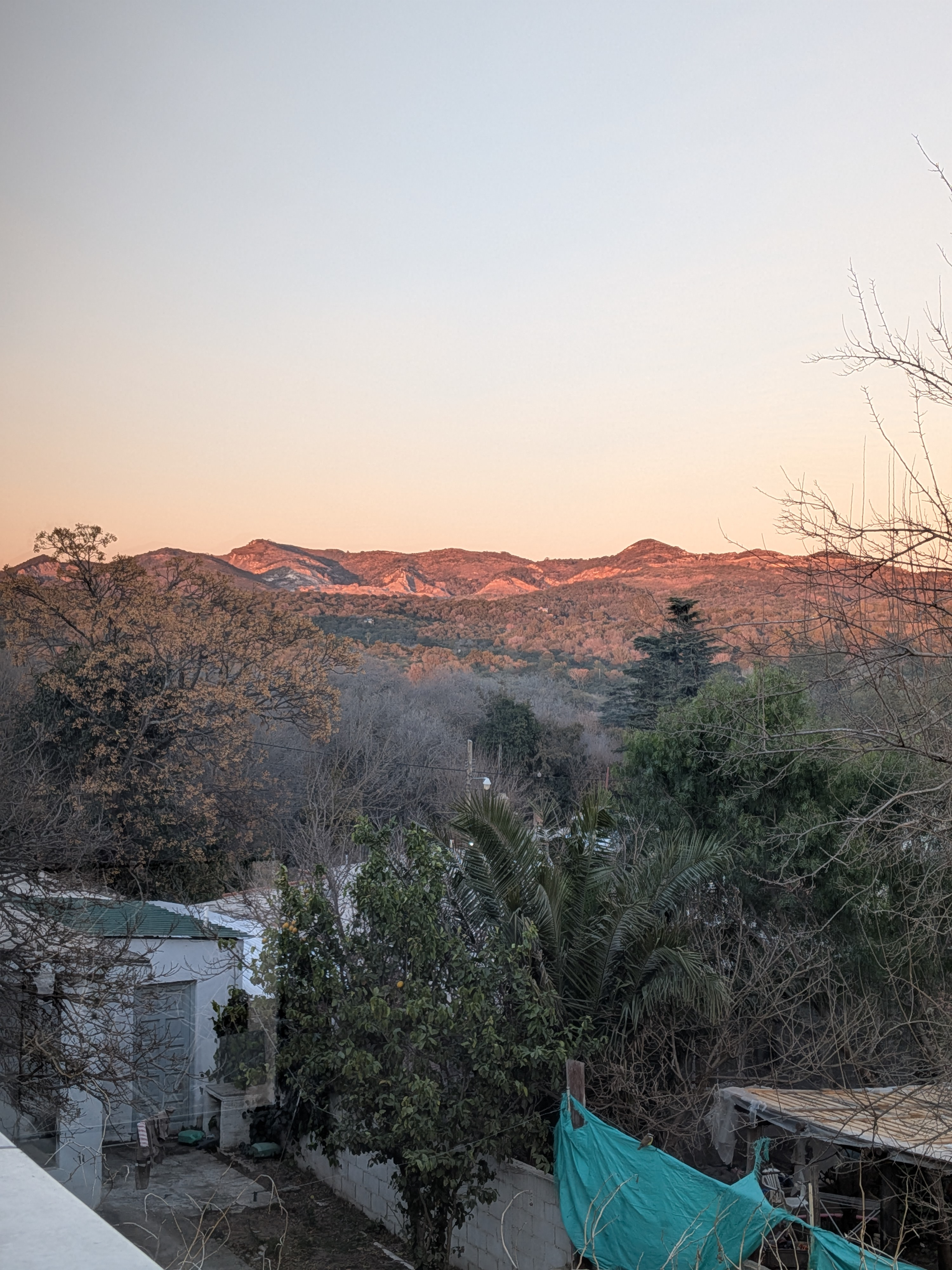
View towards the El Sauce quarry from Agua de Oro during dawn

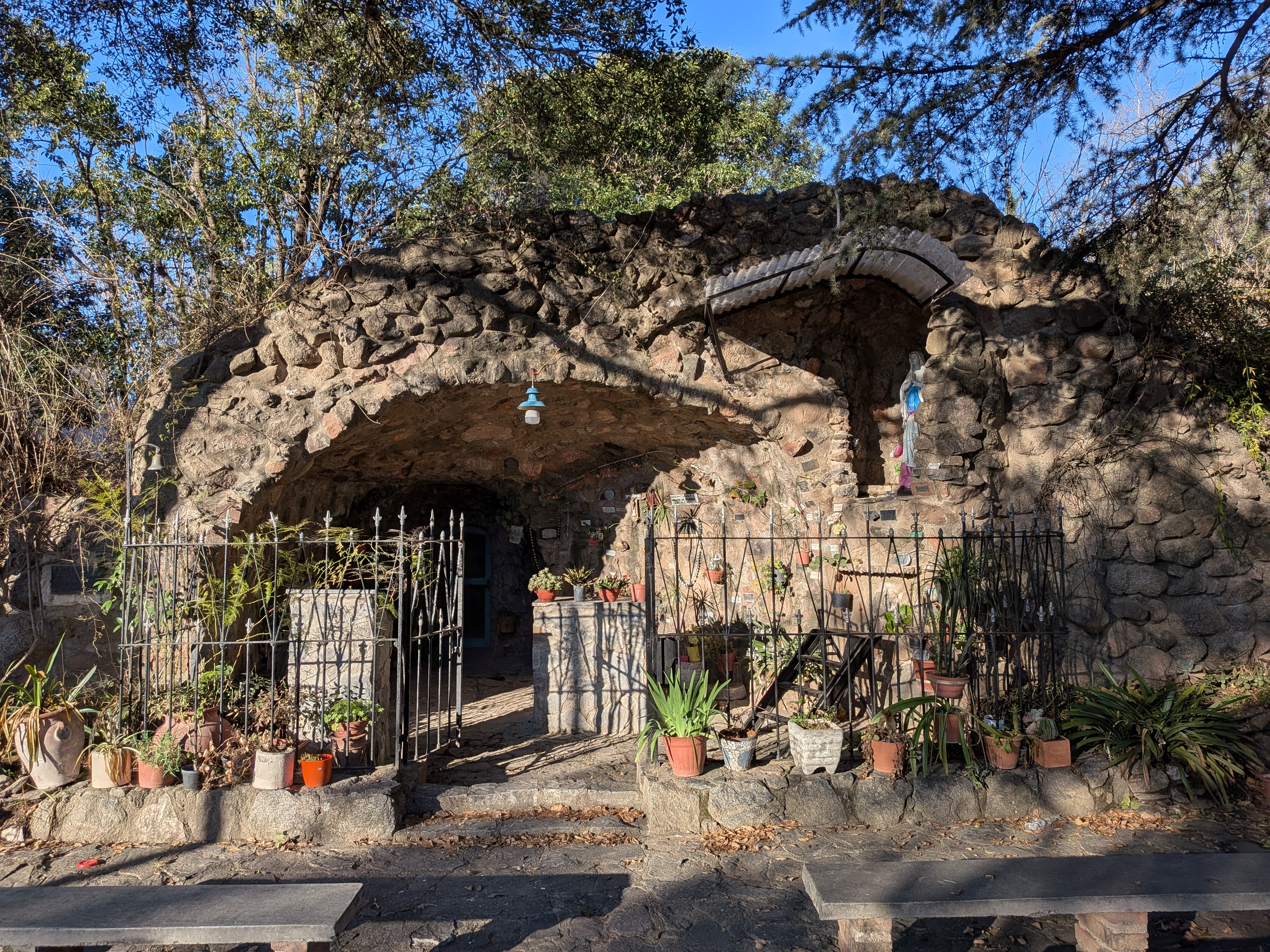
Grotto of Our Lady of Lourdes in Agua de Oro

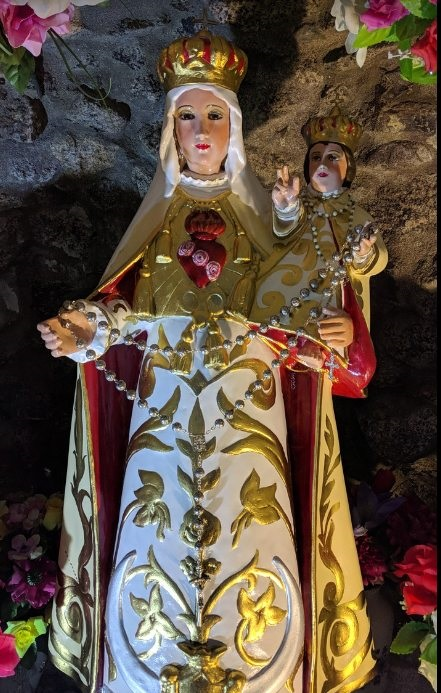
Our Lady of the Rosary in Agua de Oro

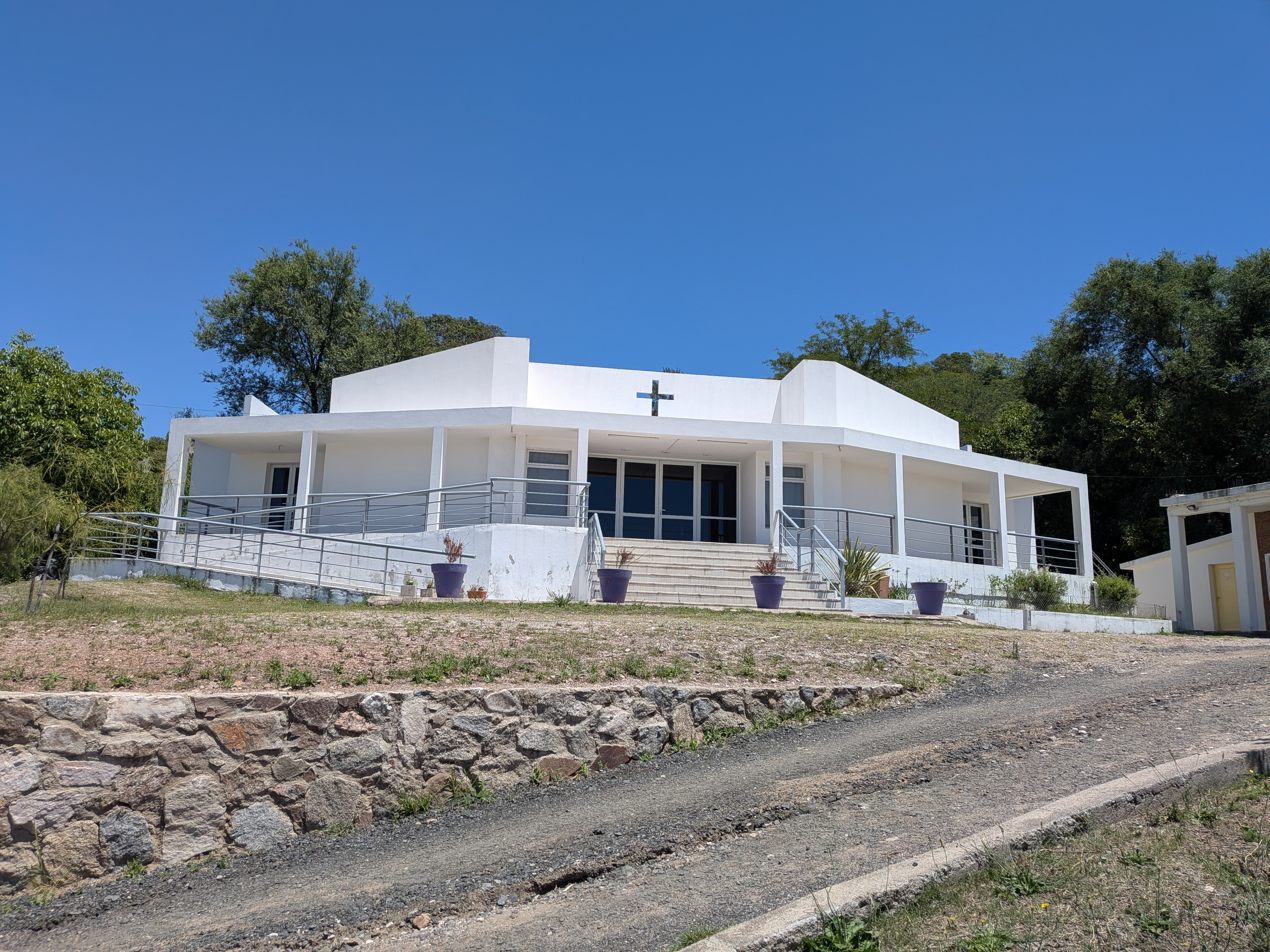
The church of the congregation "Nuestra Señora de Lourdes"

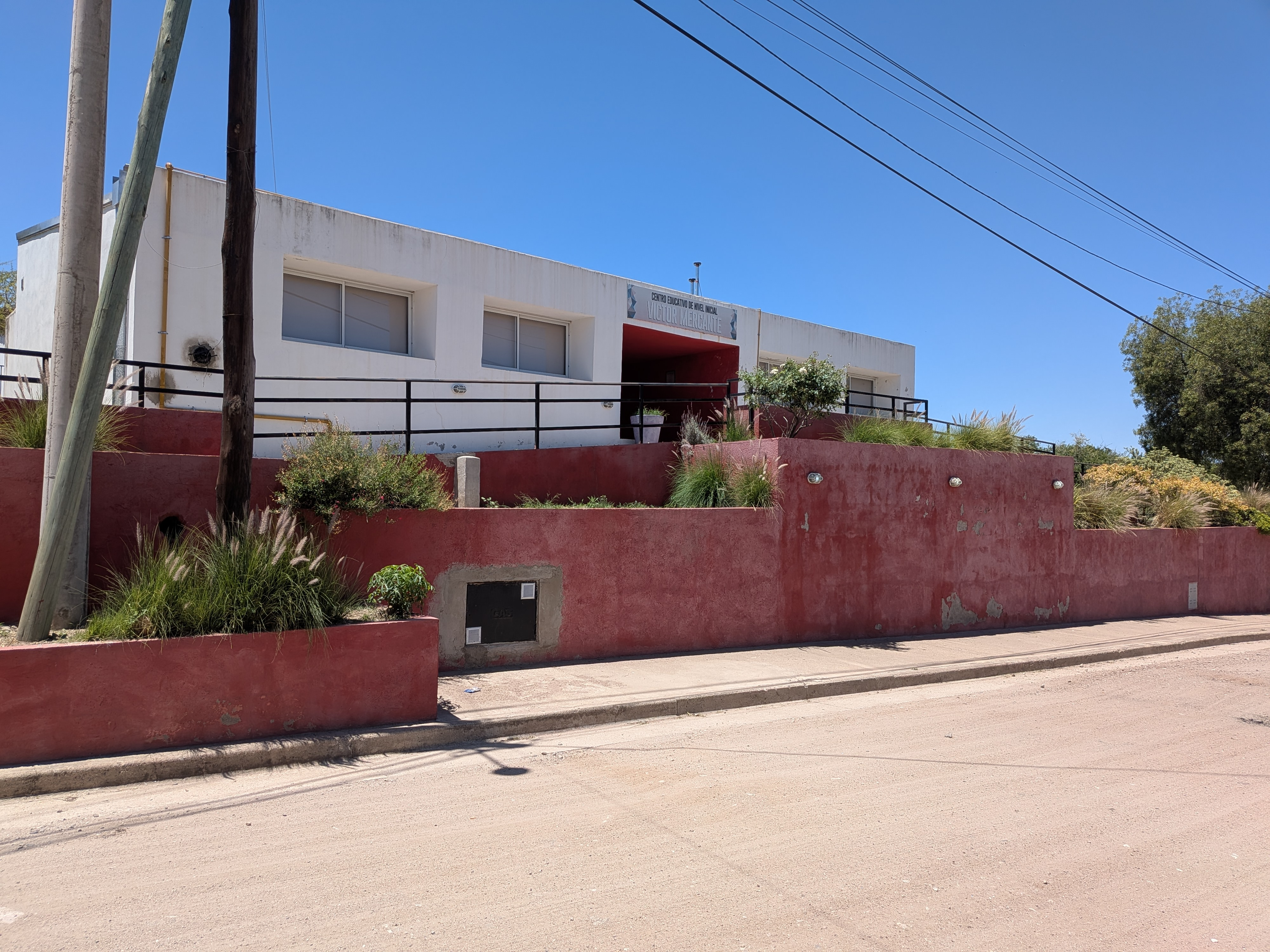
Victor Mercante school, Nivel Inicial building

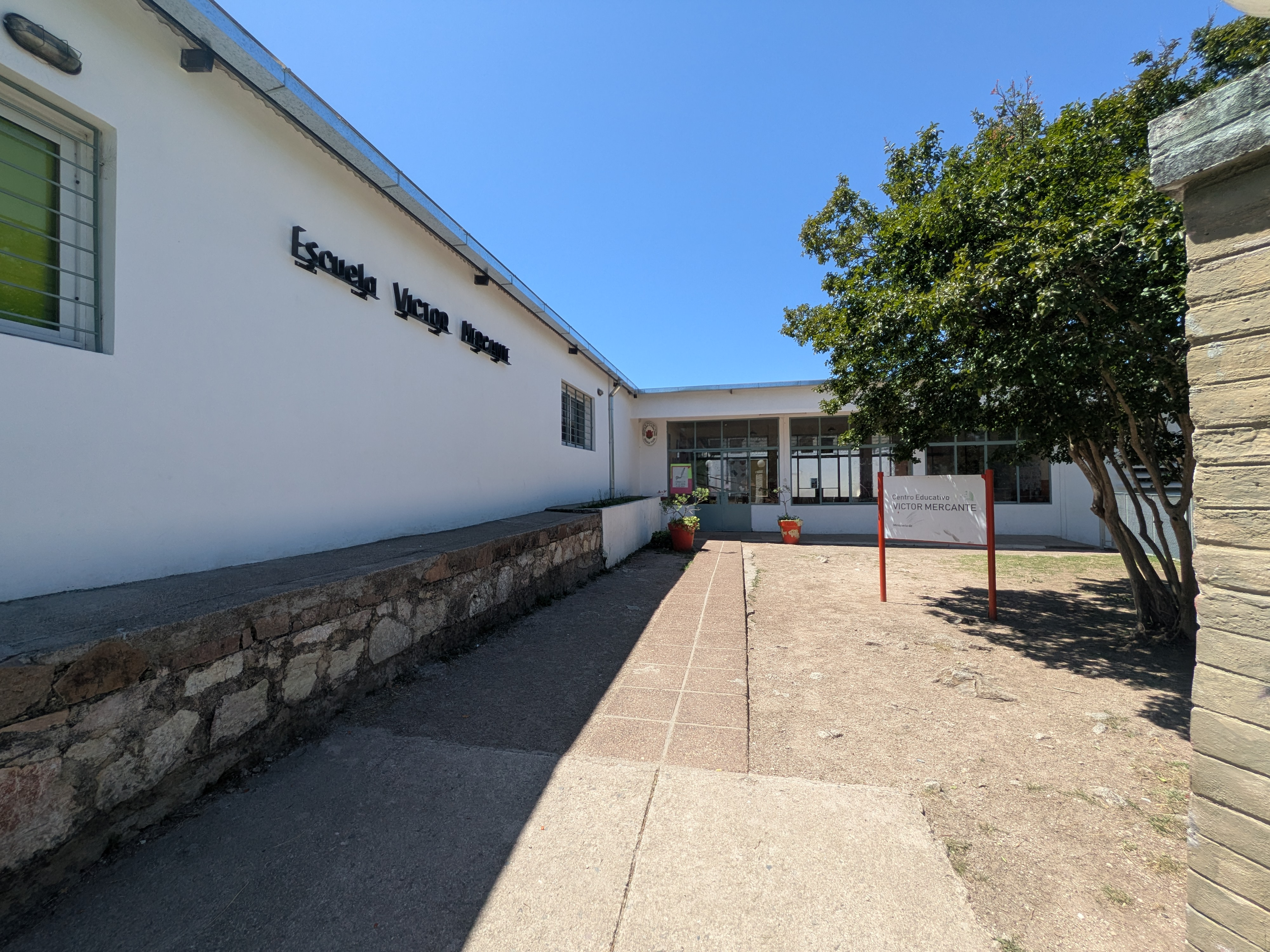
Victor Mercante primary school

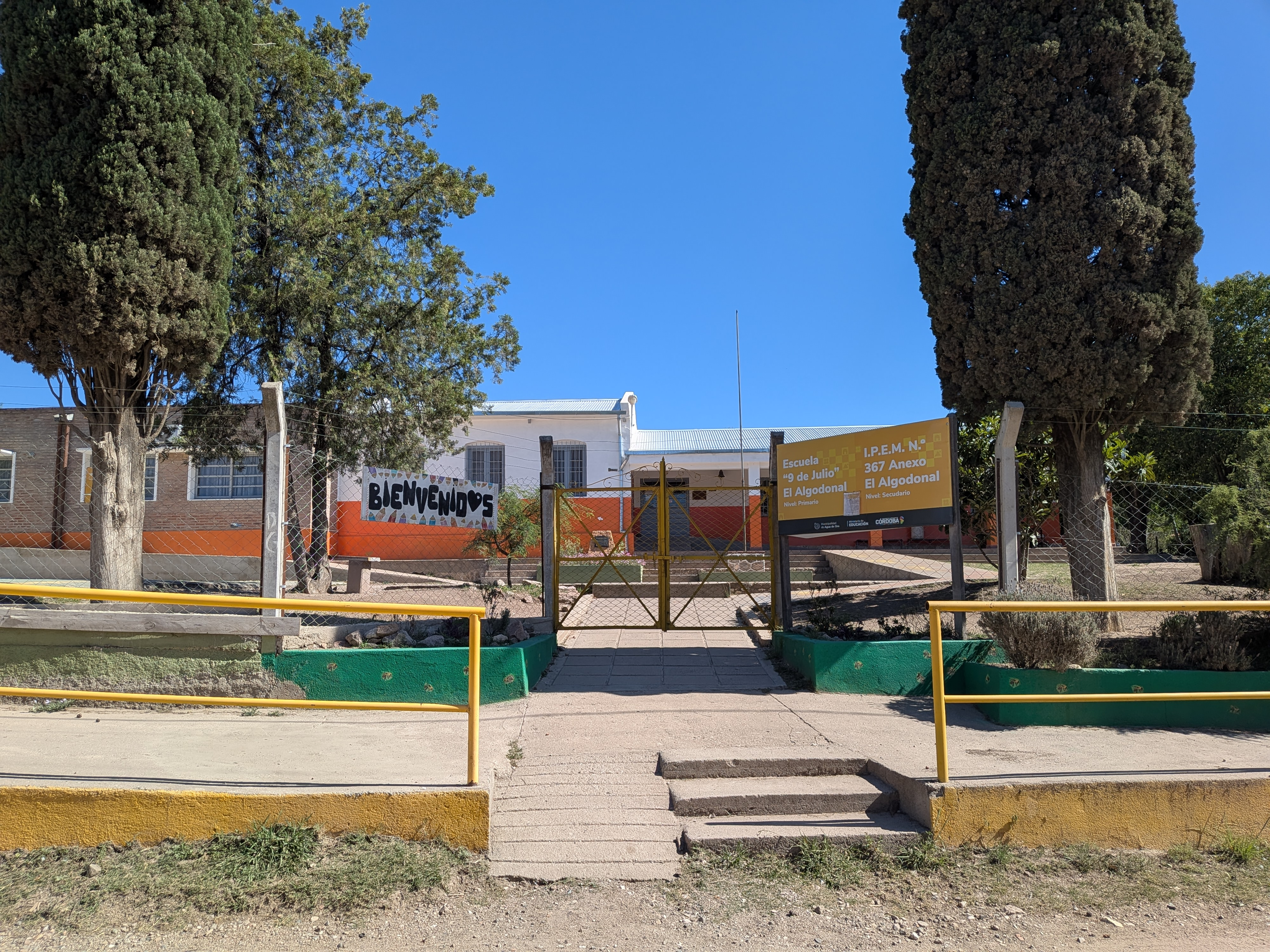
Joint IPEM 367 secondary school and 9 de Julio primary school

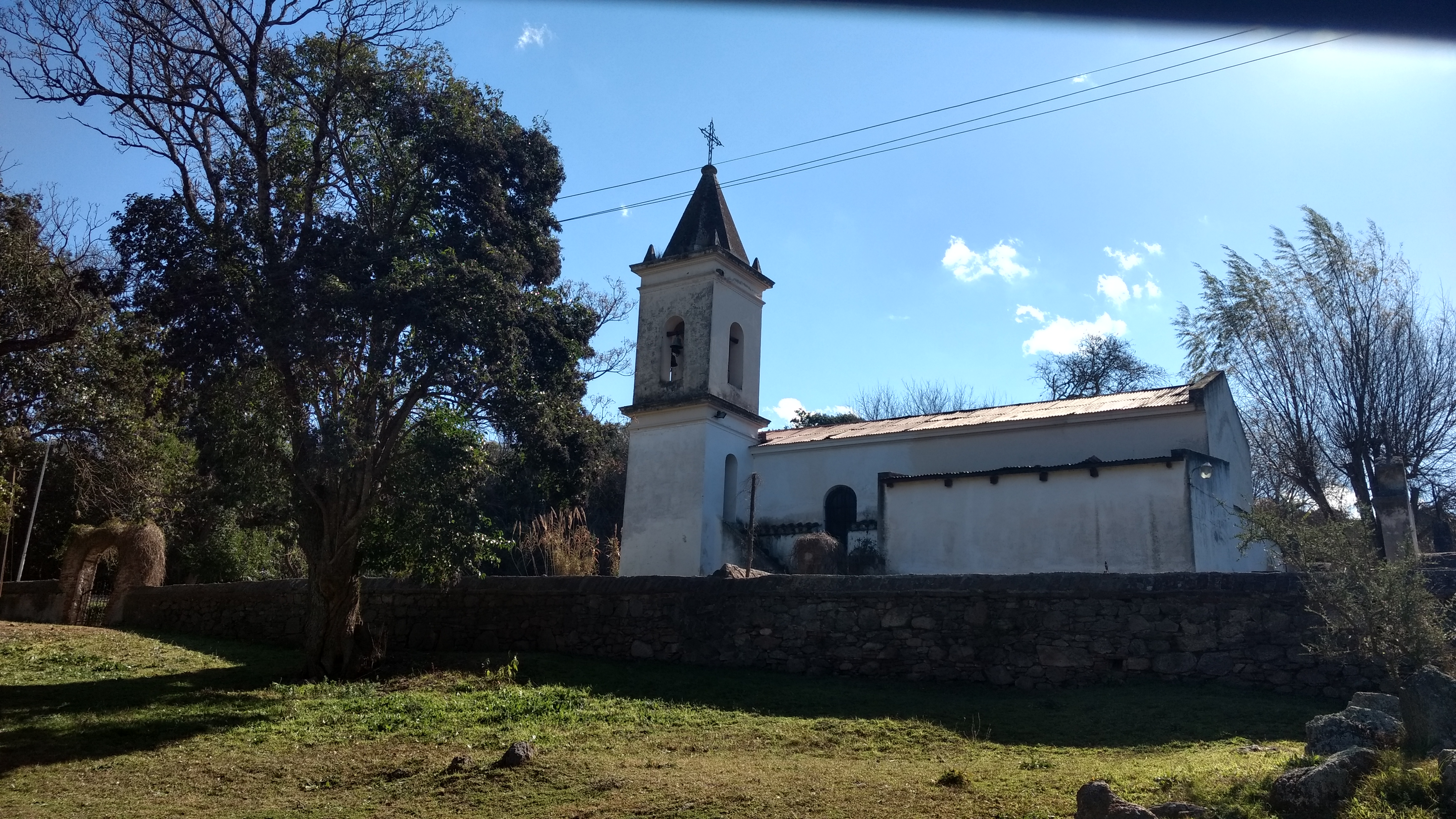
San Vicente Ferrer Chapel on the outskirts of the village

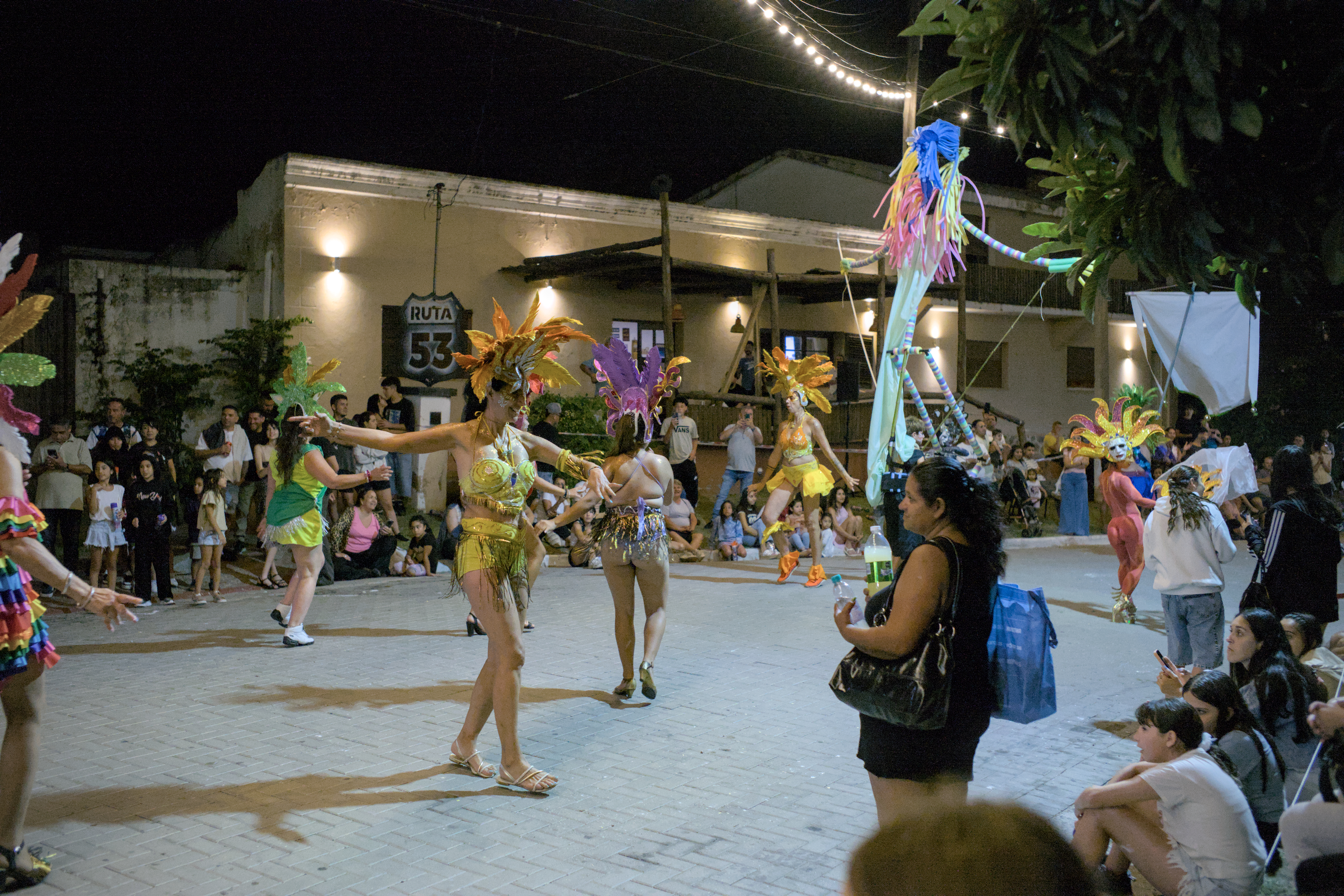
The towns carnival parade in 2026
