= Corral Quemado, Córdoba =

Corral Quemado
- Municipality and village
- Location within Córdoba Province Location within Argentina
- Coordinates: 30°58′18″S 64°21′49″W
- Country: Argentina
- Province: Córdoba
- Department: Colón Department

Population (2010)
  - Total: 52
- Time zone: UTC−3 (ART)

Corral Quemado is a locality located in the Colón Department of the province of Córdoba. It is 8 km northwest of La Granja, on which it depends administratively.
