= Estadio José Hernández =

Multi-use stadium in Jesús María, Argentina

José Hernández Amphitheatre
- Anfiteatro José Hernández
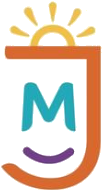

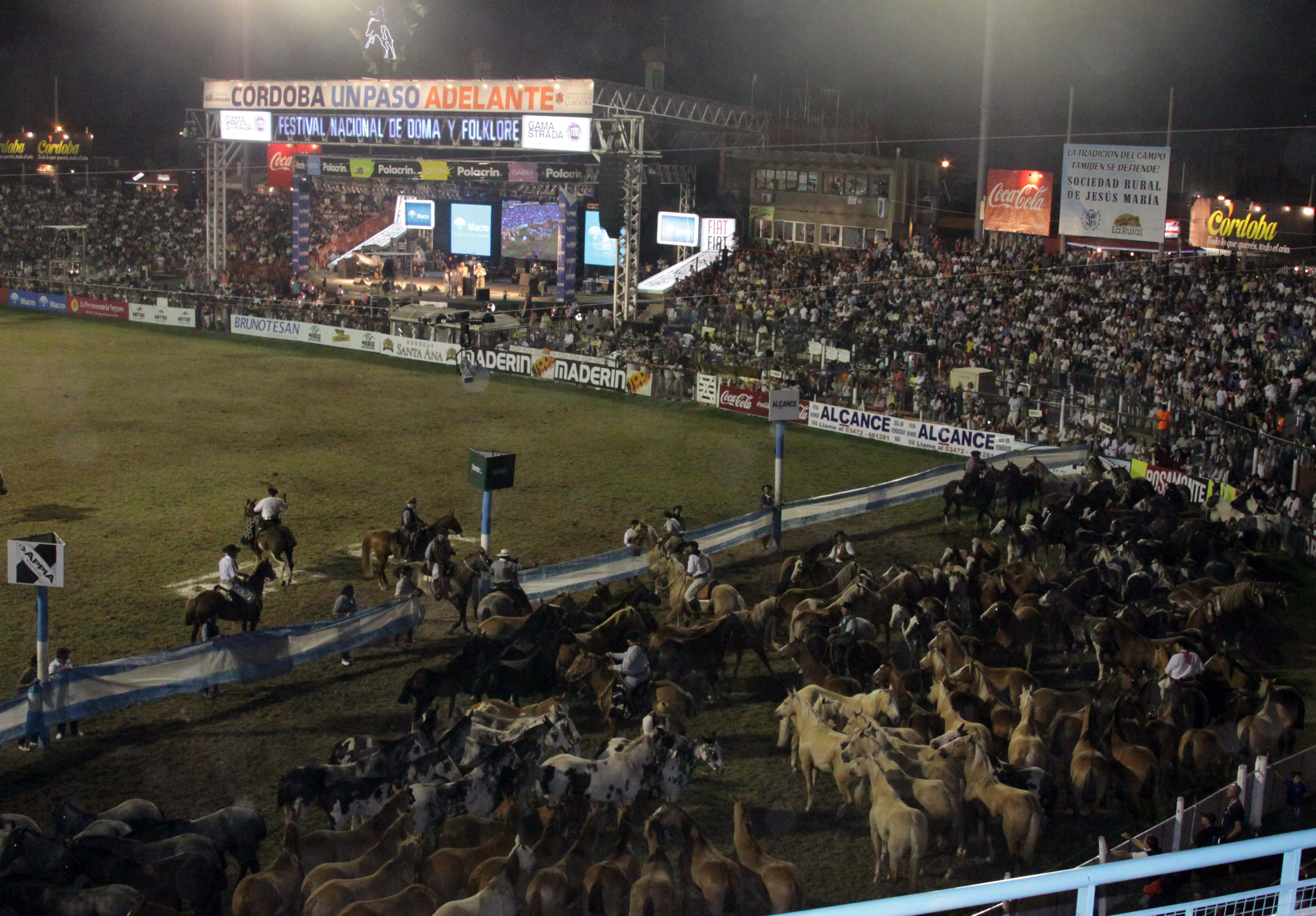
- The stadium during a jineteada in 2011
- Interactive map of José Hernández Amphitheatre
- Address: Cleto Peña s/n Jesús María; Argentina
- Owner: Municipality of Jesús María
- Capacity: 31,500 (concerts)
- Type: Stadium
- Surface: Grass

Construction
- Opened: 1966; 60 years ago

Tenants
- Festival de Jesús María (1966–present); C.S.D. Colón

Website
- festivaljesusmaria.com/anfiteatro

Anfiteatro José Hernández (or Estadio José Hernández) is a multi-purpose sports and entertainment venue located in the city of Jesús María in the Córdoba Province of Argentina. It is owned by the local Municipality and was opened in 1966. The venue has a capacity of 31,500 spectators.

The amphitheater consists of a pitch (used for jineteada gaucha or rodeos), and a stage. It was named after José Hernández, author of the epic poem Martín Fierro, the pinnacle work of gauchesco literary genere. Hernández is regarded as one of the most important Argentine writers of all time.

Since its opening in 1966, Anfiteatro José Hernández has been the venue of the Festival Nacional de Doma y Folclore, an annual local celebration that includes jineteada gaucha and concerts of Argentine folclore artists. Apart from that, the stadium has also hosted football matches. C.S.D. Colón (from the city of Colonia Caroya) is one of the football teams that used Estadio José Hernández as their home venue.
