= Susana Cabuchi =

Argentine poet and writer

- Born: January 1, 1948; Jesús María, Córdoba, Argentina
- Died: July 26, 2022 (aged 74); Jesús María, Córdoba, Argentina
- Education: National University of Córdoba
- Occupations: Poet, writer
- Writing career
- Language: Spanish

Susana Cabuchi (1948 – 26 July 2022) was an Argentine poet and writer.

== Biography ==
Susana Cabuchi was born in Jesús María, in the province of Córdoba. Her grandparents were immigrants from Syria, and this ancestry later became a central theme in her final published work.

She earned her degree from the National University of Córdoba, where she began her literary career. In her early years as a writer, she was mentored by the poet Alfredo Martínez Howard. During the 1970s, she was part of the influential "Taller de Escritura" (Writer's Workshop), a literary group that included Francisco Colombo, Juan Croce, Eduardo Curuchet, Daniel Vera, Julio Castellanos, Susana Aguad and Daniel Moyano.

Cabuchi published several volumes of poetry throughout her career, receiving awards and literary recognition both in Argentina and abroad. Her work has been translated into multiple languages and included in numerous anthologies. Beyond her literary activity, she also worked in cultural promotion and education.

She died on 26 July 2022 in Jesús María as a result of a heart attack, shortly after publishing her final book, Siria.

== Selected works ==
- El corazón de las manzanas (1978)
- Patio solo (1986)
- Álbum familiar (2000)
- El dulce país y otros poemas (2004)
- Detrás de las máscaras (2008)
- Siria (2022)

== See also ==
- Argentine literature
- List of Argentine writers
- Women in literature
