= David Nalbandian =

Argentine tennis player (born 1982)

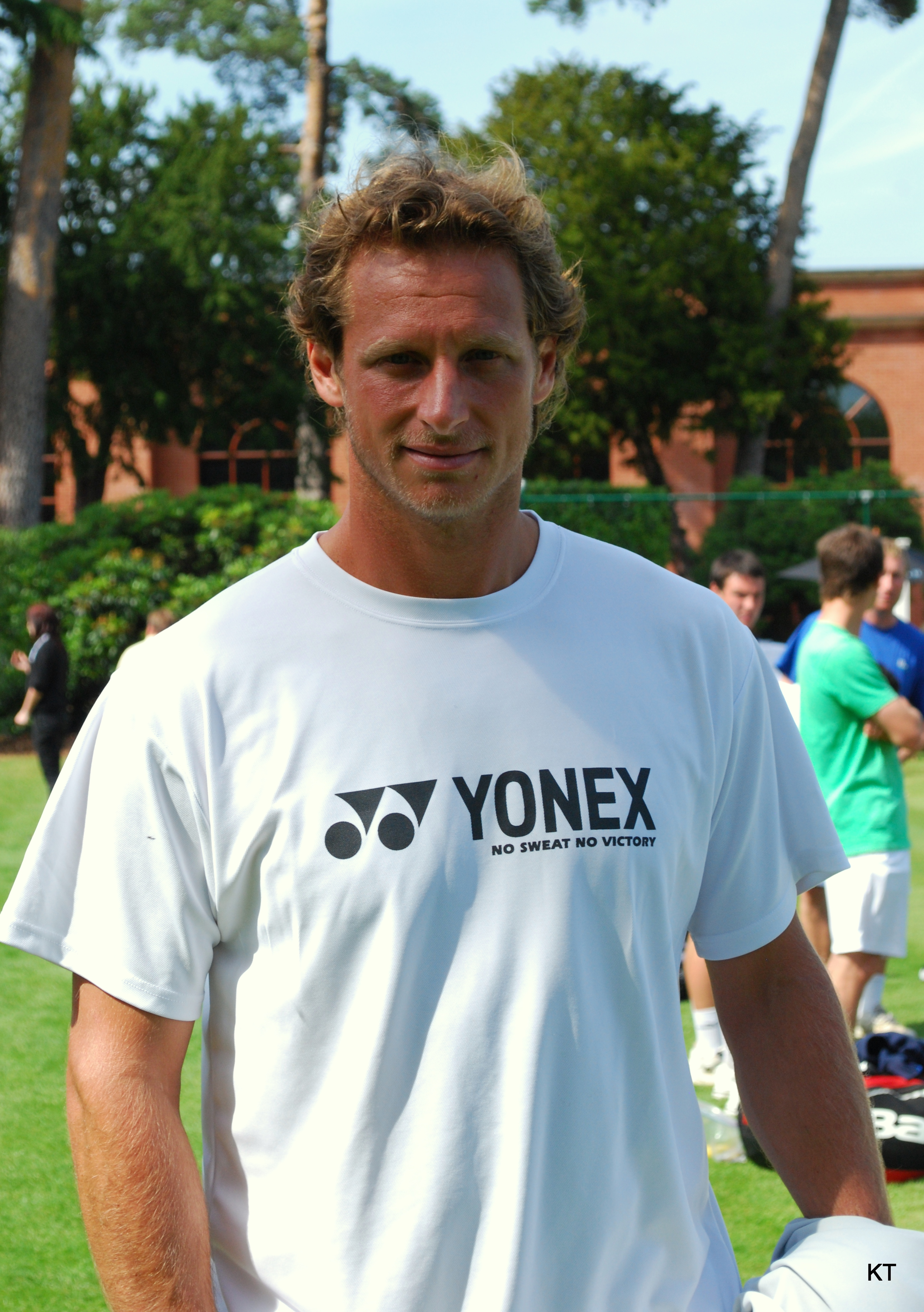
- Nalbandian at 2011 Boodles Challenge
- Full name: David Pablo Nalbandian
- Country (sports): Argentina
- Residence: Unquillo, Argentina
- Born: 1 January 1982 (age 44) Unquillo, Argentina
- Height: 1.80 m (5 ft 11 in)
- Turned pro: 2000
- Retired: 2013
- Plays: Right-handed (two-handed backhand)
- Prize money: US$11,114,755
- Official website: davidnalbandian.com

Singles
- Career record: 383–192 (66.6%)
- Career titles: 11
- Highest ranking: No. 3 (20 March 2006)

Grand Slam singles results
- Australian Open: SF (2006)
- French Open: SF (2004, 2006)
- Wimbledon: F (2002)
- US Open: SF (2003)

Other tournaments
- Tour Finals: W (2005)
- Olympic Games: 3R (2008)

Doubles
- Career record: 48–53 (47.6%)
- Career titles: 0
- Highest ranking: No. 105 (5 October 2009)

Grand Slam doubles results
- Australian Open: 1R (2003)
- French Open: 1R (2003)
- Wimbledon: 2R (2003)

Team competitions
- Davis Cup: F (2006, 2008, 2011)
Medal record
Pan American Games
| Bronze medal – third place | 1999 Winnipeg | Singles |

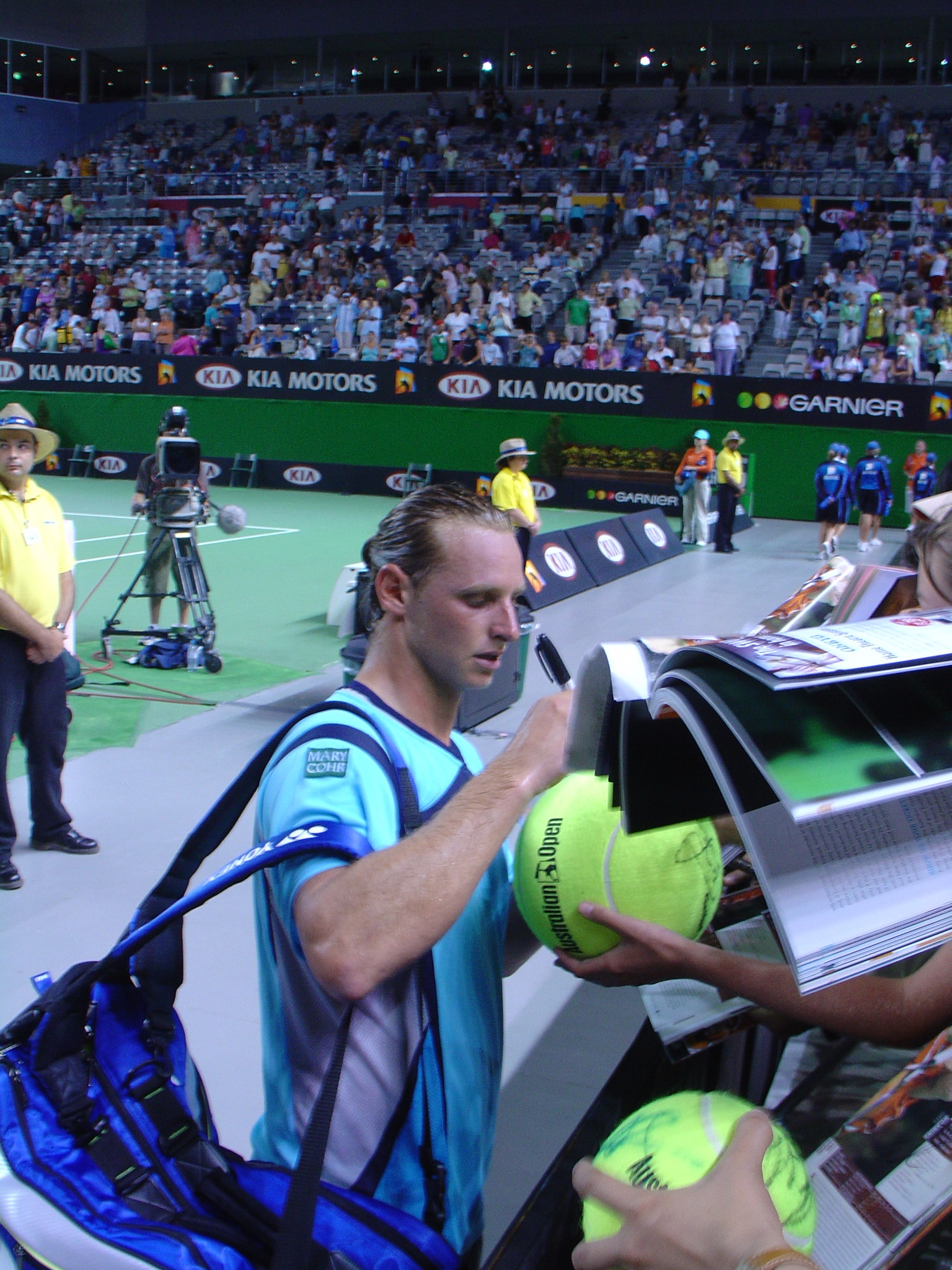
Nalbandian signing autographs at the 2006 Australian Open.

David Pablo Nalbandian (Spanish pronunciation: [daˈβið ˈpaβlo nalβanˈdjan]; born 1 January 1982) is an Argentine former professional tennis player. He reached his highest ranking in singles of world No. 3 in March 2006, during a career that spanned from 2000 to 2013. Nalbandian was runner-up in the singles event at the 2002 Wimbledon Championships. During his career, he won 11 singles titles, including the Tennis Masters Cup in 2005 and two Masters 1000 tournaments. Nalbandian is the only Argentine man in history to reach the semifinals or better at all four majors and to reach the Wimbledon final. He was a member of the Argentinian Davis Cup team who reached the finals of the World Group in 2006, 2008 and 2011. Nalbandian played right-handed with a two-handed backhand, regarded at the time to be one of the best on tour. Nalbandian was considered one of the greatest players to have never won a Grand Slam title. Since his retirement, Nalbandian has taken up the sport of rally racing and has competed in Rally Argentina.

== Early life ==
Of Armenian and Argentine descent, David Nalbandian was born in the small city of Unquillo in Córdoba Province, Argentina. He began playing tennis at age five. Father, Norberto, is deceased; mother, Alda, is a housewife; he has two brothers, Javier and Dario, who are tennis coaches. His Armenian grandfather built a cement court in his backyard, where David learned to play against his two older brothers.

Nalbandian became a professional tennis player at the age of 18.

== Career ==
=== Juniors ===
As a junior, Nalbandian reached as high as No. 3 in the world in December 1998 (and No. 5 in doubles in 2000), soon after winning the 1998 US Open boys' singles final over fellow junior Roger Federer 6–3, 7–5.

=== 2000–2002 ===
Nalbandian turned professional in 2000. In 2001, he finished in the ATP top 50 for the first time. He finished 2002 as the No. 1 Argentine and South American for the first time in his career, winning two ATP titles and reaching the Wimbledon final, where he beat David Sánchez, Paul-Henri Mathieu, George Bastl, Wayne Arthurs, Nicolás Lapentti and Xavier Malisse before losing to Lleyton Hewitt.

=== 2003–2004 ===
Nalbandian did not reach another major final in 2003. At Wimbledon he lost to Tim Henman, following a stomach injury during his previous match against Karol Kucera. In 2004, Nalbandian achieved his best result at the French Open reaching the semifinals, losing to eventual champion Gastón Gaudio. Although he did not win any titles in 2004, he did finish runner-up at both the Rome Masters and the Madrid Masters, by Carlos Moyá and Marat Safin respectively. He broke into the top 5 for the first time in his career in August and finished 2004 ranked as the World No. 9 player.

=== 2005 ===
In 2005, Nalbandian advanced to the quarterfinals of the Australian Open, Wimbledon, and the U.S. Open. At Wimbledon, Nalbandian came from two sets down to defeat Andy Murray in the third round, in what was Murray's first Major tournament. He wound up being the only player to ever defeat Murray from two sets down. He also won the Tennis Masters Cup, becoming only the second Argentine tennis player in history (after Guillermo Vilas in 1974) to win the year-end tournament. Having replaced Andy Roddick, he won two of his three group matches (to Federer, Ivan Ljubičić, and Guillermo Coria). In the semifinals, he defeated Russian Nikolay Davydenko, and in the final, he beat World No. 1 Roger Federer in a fifth-set tiebreak after coming from two sets down, with Federer succumbing to a right ankle injury after laboring out the first two sets in tiebreaks. Nalbandian became the first player to win the cup without previously attaining a Grand Slam or Masters Series title.

=== 2006 ===
In January 2006, Nalbandian beat Fabrice Santoro in the quarterfinals of the Australian Open, becoming, at the time, only the second active player (along with Roger Federer) to have reached the semifinals of each Grand Slam tournament. He lost in the semifinals to Marcos Baghdatis in a hard-fought five-set match, despite holding a two-set-to-love advantage and four games to two in the final set. In May, he won the Estoril Open Tournament in Portugal for the second time, being one of only three men to achieve this accomplishment (Carlos Costa, 1992 and 1994; and Thomas Muster, 1995 and 1996). One month later, Nalbandian reached his second French Open semifinal. It was the only time in his career that he reached two Grand Slam semifinals in one calendar year. He played Federer and started strongly, winning the first set and going 3–0 up in the second set. At 5–2 down in the third set, Nalbandian decided to retire from the match due to stomach injury. At Wimbledon, Nalbandian was beaten in the third round, where he lost to Fernando Verdasco in straight sets. At the US Open, Nalbandian was beaten in the second round by Marat Safin.

Nalbandian then competed in the Davis Cup semifinal tie against Australia. David easily won against Mark Philippoussis to give Argentina a 1–0 lead. Argentina went on to win 5–0 to reach the Davis Cup final. Later in the year, Nalbandian reached semifinals at the Masters Series Madrid and the Masters Cup, where he lost to Roger Federer and James Blake, respectively. Despite winning both of his singles rubbers in the Davis Cup final against Safin and Nikolay Davydenko, Nalbandian could not stop the Russian Davis Cup team. Argentina went on to lose 3–2.

=== 2007 ===
2007 saw Nalbandian drop out of the world's top 20 for the first time since 2003, after losing in the fourth round of the 2007 French Open to Nikolay Davydenko. Nalbandian suffered various abdominal injuries, a back injury, and a leg injury during the year. He fell to no. 26 in the world until his season changed after winning the 2007 Madrid Masters. He won the tournament by defeating second seed Rafael Nadal, third seed Novak Djokovic, and top seed Federer in consecutive rounds, becoming the third player after Boris Becker and Djoković to defeat the world's top three players in a single tournament. He defeated Nadal in the quarterfinals. His good form carried him to his second top-3 win of the tournament, defeating Djoković in the semifinals. He stunned Federer in the final and reached the doubles semifinals with Guillermo Cañas in the tournament, before losing to top-seeded brothers Bob and Mike Bryan in the semifinals. After the tournament, his singles ranking moved up from no. 25 on the tour to No. 18. Nalbandian was the only player ever to defeat all 3 members of the big three at the same tournament.

Nalbandian played at the 2007 Paris Masters and again defeated Federer, in the third round. He beat David Ferrer in the quarterfinals in a closely fought match. After beating Richard Gasquet in the semifinals, Nalbandian won his second straight ATP Masters Series title over Rafael Nadal, thus, becoming the first player to win the Madrid and Paris Masters back to back since former world no. 1, Marat Safin in 2004. This win allowed him to move back into the world's top 10 at No. 9. After the Paris Masters, Nalbandian became the first player to defeat No. 1 and No. 2 players in consecutive tournaments and win them.

=== 2008 ===
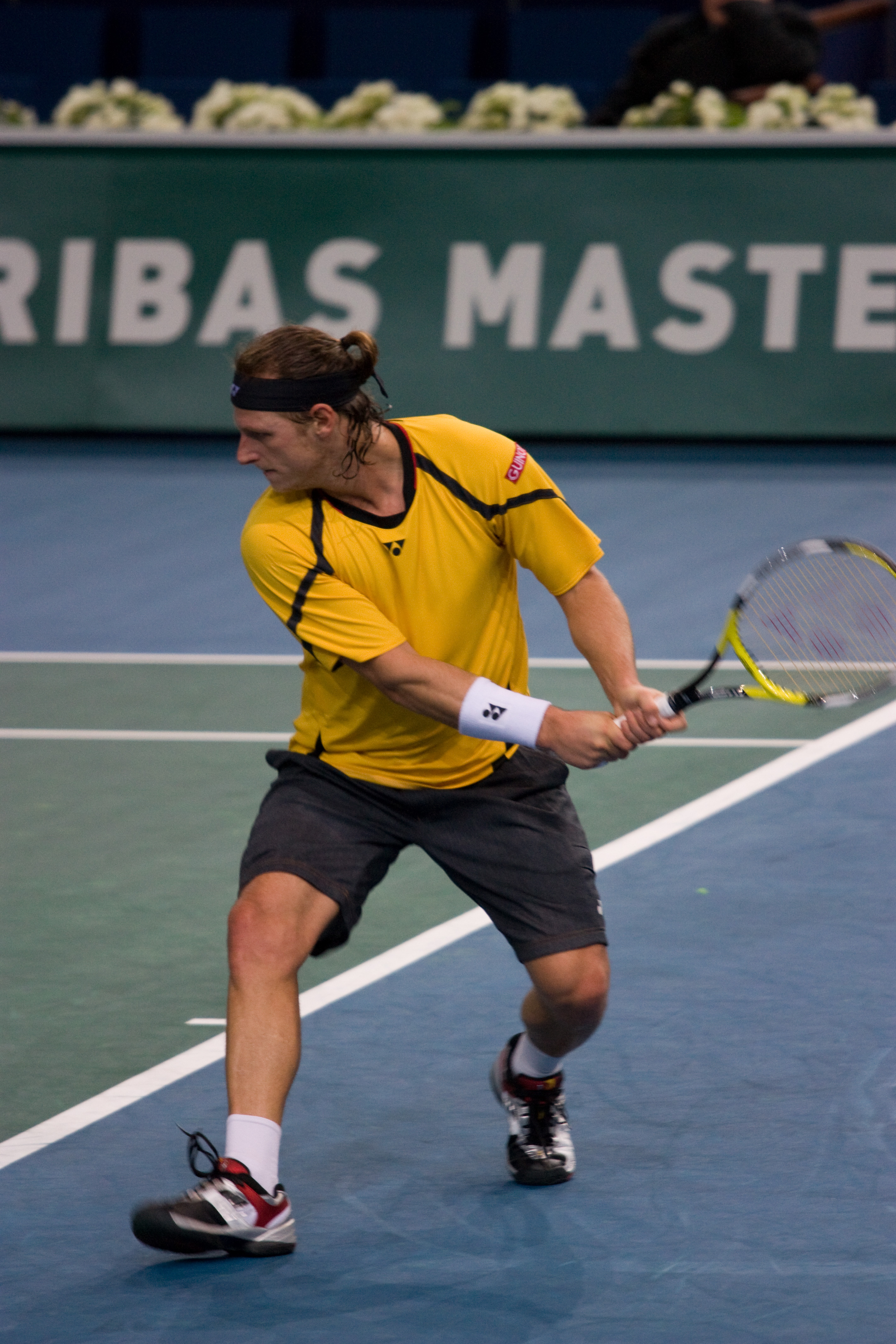
David Nalbandian attempting to defend his title at the 2008 BNP Paribas Masters

Nalbandian began his 2008 season back in the top 10. However, at the Australian Open, he failed to reach the quarterfinals, suffering a straight sets loss to the 22nd seed Juan Carlos Ferrero in the third round. On 24 February 2008, he won the Copa Telmex in Buenos Aires, beating José Acasuso in the final. With that win, he moved to World No. 8. The following week, He arrived at the Abierto Mexicano Telcel in Acapulco, Mexico and cruised all the way to the finals, along the way defeating Boris Pašanski, Santiago Ventura, Potito Starace, and Luis Horna, beating them all in straight sets, but then lost in the final, to Spaniard Nicolás Almagro.

Nalbandian entered his first ATP Masters Series tournament of the year at the 2008 Pacific Life Open, and defeated Ernests Gulbis, Radek Štěpánek and Juan Carlos Ferrero, to whom he lost earlier in the year at the Australian Open. He lost, however, in the quarterfinals against Mardy Fish in a very close match. He lost at the Monte Carlo Masters to eventual finalist Federer. In Barcelona, he was the third seed but was eliminated by Stanislas Wawrinka in the third round. At the 2008 Rome Masters, he fell in his opening match to Almagro.

At the French Open, Nalbandian suffered a shock loss in the second round to Frenchman Jérémy Chardy. After being two sets up and seemingly in control, he lost the next three to hand Chardy the win. He also suffered early exits from both Wimbledon and the US Open, losing in the second round and third round, respectively. His indoor season, however, was a success, as he won his ninth career title at the 2008 Stockholm Open, defeating Robin Söderling in the final. He was defending champion at the Madrid Masters but was quickly eliminated by fellow Argentine Juan Martín del Potro in the third round. He then entered both the Davidoff Swiss Indoors and the BNP Paribas Masters, where he was once again the defending champion. He did not win either of these tournaments but found himself in the finals of both.

To end the year, Nalbandian participated in the 2008 Davis Cup and was up on an opening match against David Ferrer. Despite a victory, he ended up on the losing team against Spain in the Davis Cup finals in Argentina (The Argentine team lost 1–3). He made some offensive comments in the press against Spain, the Spanish tennis team, and Rafael Nadal. It was rumoured that he and Agustín Calleri were involved in a fight after they lost their doubles rubber. Nalbandian denied this. He was fined $10,000 for leaving the stadium after his and Calleri's defeat in doubles to Spaniards Fernando Verdasco and Feliciano López, and for his refusal to appear at a subsequent press conference to comment on the Argentine team's setback.

=== 2009 ===
Nalbandian started his 2009 tour by winning his tenth career ATP title at the Medibank International in Sydney, Australia, after defeating Finland's Jarkko Nieminen in the final. At the Australian Open, he defeated Marc Gicquel in the first round, in four sets before being upset by unseeded Taiwanese player Lu Yen-Hsun in five sets in the second round. At the 2009 BNP Paribas Open in Indian Wells, California, he lost to World No. 1 Rafael Nadal in the fourth round for the first time, failing to convert on five match points in the second set. In May, he announced that he would have to undergo hip surgery, resulting in not being able to compete in the remaining Grand Slams and the Davis Cup. In August, he announced that he would return to practice and eventually to competitive tennis at the Australian Open in January 2010. A few days before the beginning of the tournament, he was forced to withdraw from the event due to an abdominal injury.

=== 2010 ===
Because of several knee injuries in the early part of the 2010 season, Nalbandian finally made a return, beginning at the 2010 Copa Telmex, his hometown tournament. He beat Potito Starace in the first round over a period of two days due to a rain delay. In the second round, he beat Daniel Gimeno-Traver. However, he pulled out of his quarterfinals match against fifth seed Albert Montañés due to a right leg injury. He made a return to tennis by playing doubles for Argentina in the Davis Cup against Sweden in Stockholm, which he won in straight sets. He played the deciding singles rubber, defeating Vinciguerra and helped Argentina reach the quarterfinals.

Playing in his first Masters Series event since Monte Carlo the previous year, Nalbandian appeared at the 2010 BNP Paribas Open in Indian Wells. There, he won his first-round match against Stefan Koubek. In his next-round match, he played 22nd seed Jürgen Melzer and lost. He then entered the 2010 Sony Ericsson Open in Miami as a wildcard entrant. He beat Łukasz Kubot and Viktor Troicki before falling to Rafael Nadal in three sets. He entered the 2010 Monte-Carlo Rolex Masters in Monaco, ranked No. 151 in the world, beating Andreas Beck in straight sets, before coming through against World No. 13 Mikhail Youzhny of Russia in the second round. Nalbandian beat Tommy Robredo, before losing in the quarterfinals to the second-ranked Novak Djokovic. Nalbandian withdrew from the 2010 Internazionali BNL d'Italia with a right leg injury. He withdrew from the 2010 Mutua Madrileña Madrid Open, the 2010 Roland Garros and the 2010 Wimbledon Championships due to a left hamstring injury.

In July, Nalbandian played two singles matches for Argentina against Russia in the Davis Cup at the Olympic Stadium in Moscow. He defeated Nikolay Davydenko in the first rubber and Mikhail Youzhny in the fifth and final rubber, giving Argentina a victory of 3–2 to qualify for the semifinals. He made his return in the 2010 Legg Mason Tennis Classic, where he won the title, his first since 2009 Medibank International Sydney after wins over Rajeev Ram, Stanislas Wawrinka, Marco Chiudinelli, Gilles Simon and Marin Čilić. He defeated Marcos Baghdatis in the finals, guaranteeing a jump in the rankings up to the vicinity of world no. 45. The following week, he had a successful run to the quarterfinals in the Roger's Masters Series in Toronto, defeating David Ferrer, Tommy Robredo, and Robin Söderling, before losing to World No. 4 Andy Murray after this 11-match winning streak. This run took his rank up to world No. 37. He competed at the 2010 BNP Paribas Masters, where he lost again to Murray in the second round.

In November, Nalbandian was granted the Platinum Konex Award as the best tennis player of the last decade in Argentina.

=== 2011 ===
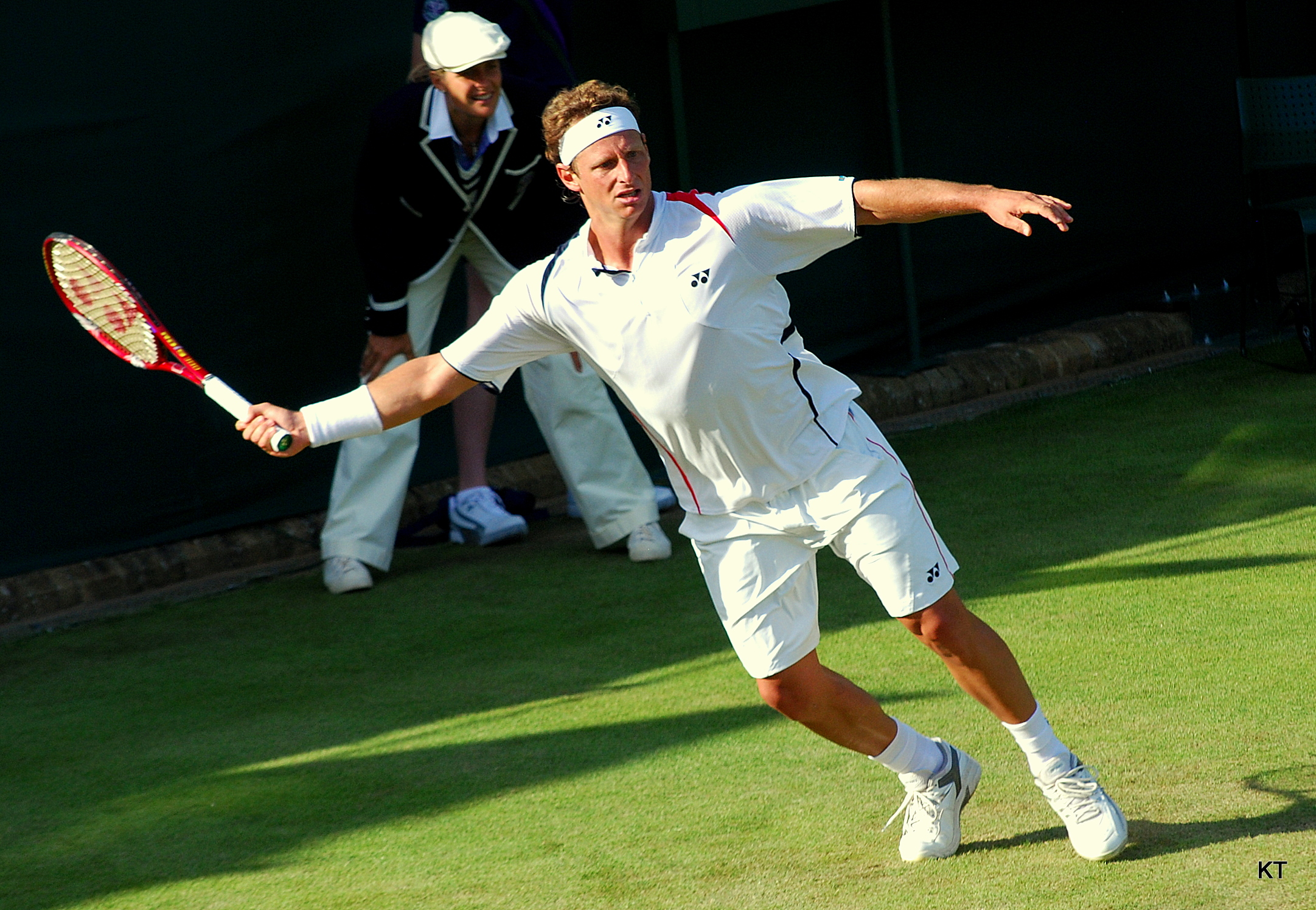
David Nalbandian at the 2011 Wimbledon Championships

Nalbandian began the year ranked No. 27 in the world. As sixth seed in the Auckland Open, Nalbandian beat Fabio Fognini, Philipp Kohlschreiber, John Isner, and Nicolás Almagro, without losing a set. However, he lost in the final against David Ferrer. His performance propelled him to the rank of No. 21 in the world, while also achieving the no. 1 Argentina position at the expense of Juan Martín del Potro, who was also injured. He faced Lleyton Hewitt again. The match, dubbed the "Clash of the Titans", went in the fifth set as in 2005, but this time for Nalbandian, after 57 games. He saved two match points, but in the second round was forced to retire due to cramps and fatigue, 1–6, 0–6, 0–2, to Ričardas Berankis. After the Australian Open, he played in the Movistar Open.

Nalbandian began his tour on clay by beating his compatriot Carlos Berlocq, before losing against Horacio Zeballos. In Buenos Aires, he lost in the quarterfinals to Tommy Robredo. He played a Davis Cup match, winning in four sets against Romanian Adrian Ungur. Due to a torn hamstring and a hernia, he missed many tournaments including Indian Wells, Miami, Monte Carlo, Madrid and Rome Masters. He lost to Roger Federer in the third round of Wimbledon.

=== 2012 ===
In the Australian Open, Nalbandian had a five-set loss to Isner and was fined $8,000 for unsportsmanlike conduct following the match. On February, David participated in two Davis Cup matches for Argentina against the German team, defeating Florian Mayer in a singles match and then partnering with Eduardo Schwank to win a doubles match against Tommy Haas and Philipp Petzschner to help the Argentinian team advance to the quarterfinals. Afterward, Nalbandian played a string of clay tournaments, reaching the quarterfinals in the Brasil Open, semifinals in Buenos Aires and a first-round exit at the Mexican Open. He then entered the first ATP Masters 1000 tournament of the year, the 2012 BNP Paribas Open in Indian Wells, losing in the quarterfinals to Rafael Nadal. After the tournament, Nalbandian reached No. 40 in the ATP rankings but failed to progress past the first round in the 2012 French Open as he was beaten by the Romanian, Adrian Ungur in four sets.

==== Queen's Club Championships incident ====
In June, Nalbandian reached the final of the Aegon Championships at the Queen's Club in England for the first time. He led his opponent Marin Čilić by a set but, having been broken to trail 3–4 in the second, was disqualified when he violently kicked a wooden partition in front of a seated line judge, injuring the linesman and drawing blood from his shin.

The kick was broadcast live on the BBC television coverage of the event, and a clip showing the incident was widely viewed on YouTube. A complaint alleging assault was made to the Metropolitan Police, who commenced investigations. An ATP spokesman stated that:

Nalbandian automatically forfeited his prize money and ranking points due to his conduct default. A maximum £8,000 (10,000 euro) fine was issued on site by the ATP Supervisor for unsportsmanlike conduct.

In forfeiting his potential prize money of £36,114 [$57,350] plus the £8,000 [$12,560] conduct fine, Nalbandian incurred a total loss over the weekend of £44,114 [$69,910]. He was additionally docked 150 ranking points by the ATP.

Nalbandian was unseeded at the Wimbledon championships, which followed soon after, and was defeated in straight sets by Janko Tipsarević in the first round. He lost again to Tipsarević in the first round at the London Olympics.

==== US Open withdrawal ====
Nalbandian withdrew from the 2012 US Open due to a strained muscle in his chest, one day before his scheduled first-round match against compatriot and 2009 champion Juan Martín del Potro.

=== 2013 ===
Nalbandian played the last final of his career at the 2013 Brasil Open, where he lost to Rafael Nadal. After the quarterfinal win over France in the Davis Cup, where he played doubles, he was forced to undergo an operation on his right shoulder, sidelining him for much of the 2013 season. On 1 October, he announced his retirement.

== After tennis ==
Nalbandian has sought to continue a sporting career and has taken up Rallying in the Argentine Rally Championship. Since then, his career has progressed to appearances in the Codasur South American Rally Championship and one appearance in the World Rally Championship. He mostly races an Argentine specification Chevrolet Agile.

In February 2021, Nalbandian was hired as a coach by Miomir Kecmanović.

Since 2026, Nalbandian is coaching Grigor Dimitrov.

== Playing style ==
Nalbandian was an all-court player and a clean ball-striker. He had a decent service game compared to top 20 players. His signature play was the wide drive that swings out of court on both sides, low and spinning. He could return high balls on both wings with acute angles and low trajectories.

Nalbandian's ground game was complemented by his anticipation, speed and ability to end points at the net. Nalbandian's trademark shot is his double-handed backhand down-the-line, which was often regarded as one of the best double-handed backhands of all time. He often used it to set up a point, by either hitting a clean winner or forcing a weak return from the opponent. Nalbandian is also known to be one of the game's best returners. He was consistently able to knock balls back deep on the baseline to effectively set up the point or hit return winners off second serves, but he also had the ability to block it back deep when returning a more effective serve. He also used a "chip-and-charge" technique against the opponents' serves to surprise them.

Early in his career, Nalbandian was considered one of the most talented young players on tour, and touted as a future star of the game, alongside the likes of Roger Federer, Lleyton Hewitt, Marat Safin, Andy Roddick and Juan Carlos Ferrero. Early in his career, he was cited as a rival of Federer, having beaten him five times consecutively between 2002 and 2003. However, injuries, lack of consistency, and poor mental temperament have been cited as his biggest weaknesses that prevented him from achieving his full potential. Nalbandian has been considered by a lot of commentators and fans as one of the biggest underachievers in the game.

== Career statistics ==
Key
| W | F | SF | QF | #R | RR | Q# | DNQ | A | NH |

(W) winner; (F) finalist; (SF) semifinalist; (QF) quarterfinalist; (#R) rounds 4, 3, 2, 1; (RR) round-robin stage; (Q#) qualification round; (DNQ) did not qualify; (A) absent; (NH) not held; (SR) strike rate (events won / competed); (W–L) win–loss record.

=== Grand Slam performance timeline ===
| Tournament | 2001 | 2002 | 2003 | 2004 | 2005 | 2006 | 2007 | 2008 | 2009 | 2010 | 2011 | 2012 | 2013 | SR | W–L | Win % |
|---|---|---|---|---|---|---|---|---|---|---|---|---|---|---|---|---|
| Australian Open | A | 2R | QF | QF | QF | SF | 4R | 3R | 2R | A | 2R | 2R | A | 0 / 10 | 26–10 | 72.22% |
| French Open | Q1 | 3R | 2R | SF | 4R | SF | 4R | 2R | A | A | A | 1R | A | 0 / 8 | 20–8 | 71.43% |
| Wimbledon | A | F | 4R | A | QF | 3R | 3R | 1R | A | A | 3R | 1R | A | 0 / 8 | 19–8 | 70.37% |
| US Open | 3R | 1R | SF | 2R | QF | 2R | 3R | 3R | A | 3R | 3R | A | A | 0 / 10 | 21–10 | 67.74% |
| Win–loss | 2–1 | 9–4 | 13–4 | 10–3 | 15–4 | 13–4 | 10–4 | 5–4 | 1–1 | 2–1 | 5–3 | 1–3 | 0–0 | 0 / 36 | 86–36 | 70.49% |

==== Finals: 1 (1 runner-up) ====
| Result | Year | Championship | Surface | Opponent | Score |
|---|---|---|---|---|---|
| Loss | 2002 | Wimbledon | Grass | (Australia) Lleyton Hewitt | 1–6, 3–6, 2–6 |

=== Year-end championship performance timeline ===
| Tournament | 2000 | 2001 | 2002 | 2003 | 2004 | 2005 | 2006 | 2007 | 2008 | 2009 | 2010 | 2011 | 2012 | 2013 | SR | W–L | Win % |
|---|---|---|---|---|---|---|---|---|---|---|---|---|---|---|---|---|---|
| ATP World Tour Finals | Did not qualify | | | RR | A | W | SF | Did not qualify | | | | | | | 1 / 3 | 6–6 | 50.00% |

==== Year–end Championship finals: 1 (1 title) ====
| Result | Year | Championship | Surface | Opponent | Score |
|---|---|---|---|---|---|
| Win | 2005 | Tennis Masters Cup | Carpet (i) | (Switzerland) Roger Federer | 6–7^{(4–7)}, 6–7^{(11–13)}, 6–2, 6–1, 7–6^{(7–3)} |

Awards and achievements
| Preceded by (Argentina) Manu Ginóbili and Carlos Tevez | Olimpia de Oro; 2005 | Succeeded by (Argentina) Germán Chiaraviglio |
