= Colón Department, Córdoba =

Colón Department Departamento Colón
- Department
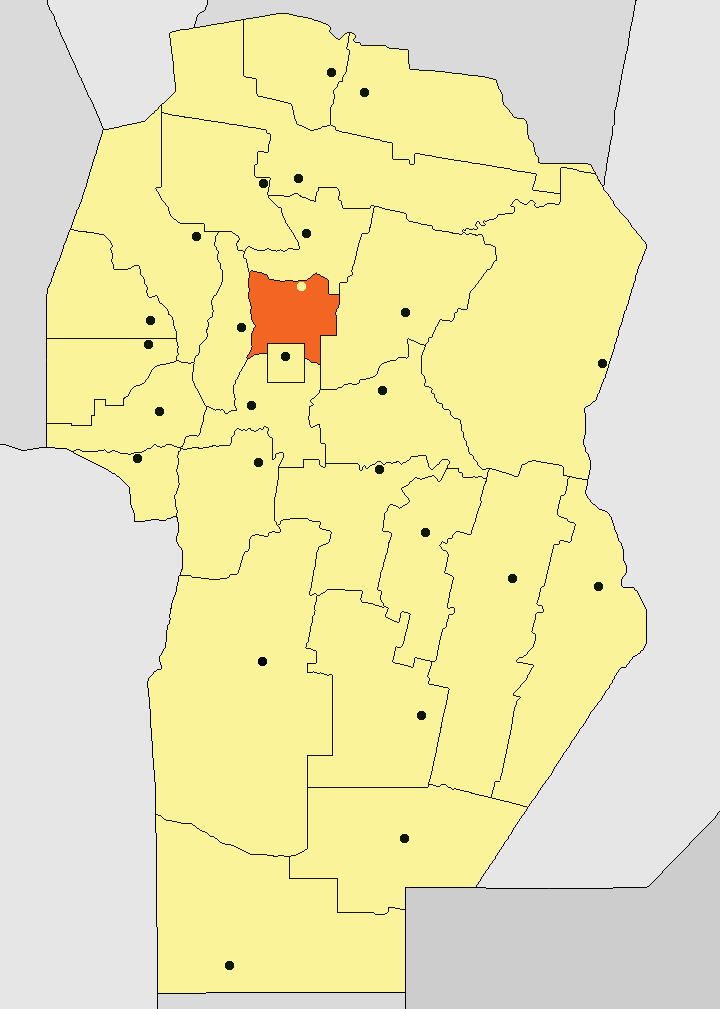
- Location of Colón Department in Córdoba Province
- Coordinates: 30°59′S 64°05′W
- Country: Argentina
- Province: Córdoba
- Capital: Jesús María

Area
  - Total: 2,568 km^{2} (992 sq mi)

Population (2022 census [INDEC])
  - Total: 295 725
  - Density: 0.115/km^{2} (0.298/sq mi)
  - Pop. change (2010-2022): +31.3%
- Time zone: UTC-3 (ART)
- Postal code: X5220
- Dialing code: 03525
- Distances to
- Buenos Aires: 760 km (470 mi)
- Córdoba: 48 km (30 mi)

Colón Department is a department of the Province of Córdoba in Argentina, which spreads from the Sierras Chicas on the western end, into the Pampas plains towards the east.

The provincial subdivision had a population of about 295,725 inhabitants in 2022, with an area of 2,568.2 square kilometers (992 sq mi), and its capital city is Jesús María, which is located 760 miles (1,223 km) from Buenos Aires.

== Economy ==
Agriculture and tourism are two of the main branches of the local economy.

=== Agriculture ===
Soy and corn are the two main crops grown in the department, in the 2017/2018 season they represented 57% (64265 hectares) and 37.5% (42347 ha) of the total crop-growing surface of the department.

Furthermore, livestock, is kept in the department. This includes poultry, pork, sheep and cows for the meat production.

== Mining ==
The department is home to a number of quarries that are mostly used for extracting building materials and that have sparked environmental and labor concerns amongst the municipalities

=== Tourism ===
Due to its location in the Sierras Chicas, Colón is a common tourist destination, in particular during the summer months. In 2026, various cities in the department reported large tourist numbers, both from national and international visitors. Amongst others, the towns of Salsipuedes, Agua de Oro, La Granja, Ascochinga and Jesús María are popular destinations. Many of those places offer various outdoor tourist activities, like hiking or horseback-riding.

Every January, Jesús María hosts the Festival Nacional de la Doma y el Folclore (Horse Training and Folklore Festival), attracting hundred-thousands of visitors. Additionally, many of the municipalities in the department organize events to celebrate carnival, attracting tourists as well.

== Settlements ==
- Agua de Oro
- Ascochinga
- Colonia Caroya
- Colonia Tirolesa
- Colonia Vicente Agüero
- Dumesnil
- El Manzano
- Estación General Paz
- Estación Juárez Celman
- Jesús María
- La Calera
- La Granja
- Malvinas Argentinas
- Mendiolaza
- Mi Granja
- Río Ceballos
- Saldán
- Salsipuedes
- Tinoco
- Unquillo
- Villa Allende
- Villa Cerro Azul
