= Puerta de Corral Quemado =

Coordinates: 27°14′S 66°56′W

- Municipality and village
- Interactive map of Puerta de Corral Quemado
- Country: Argentina
- Province: Catamarca Province
- Time zone: UTC−3 (ART)

Puerta de Corral Quemado is a village and municipality in Catamarca Province in northwestern Argentina.
