= Unquillo =

- City
- Location of Unquillo in Argentina
- Coordinates: 31°14′S 64°19′W
- Country: Argentina
- Province: Córdoba
- Department: Colón

Government
  - Intendant: Guillermo Valli

Population (2010 census)
  - Total: 18,483
- Time zone: UTC−3 (ART)
- CPA base: X5109
- Dialing code: +54 3543
- Website: www.unquillo.gov.ar

Diesel rail car CM-315 at Unquillo station, Córdoba

Unquillo is a city in the province of Córdoba, Argentina. It has 18,483 inhabitants as per the 2010 census [INDEC]. It is located about 28 km north-northwest from the center of the provincial capital, Córdoba City, and 14 km east of Cosquín.

Unquillo is the birthplace of professional tennis player David Nalbandian.
