= La Granja, Argentina =

La Granja
- Municipality and town
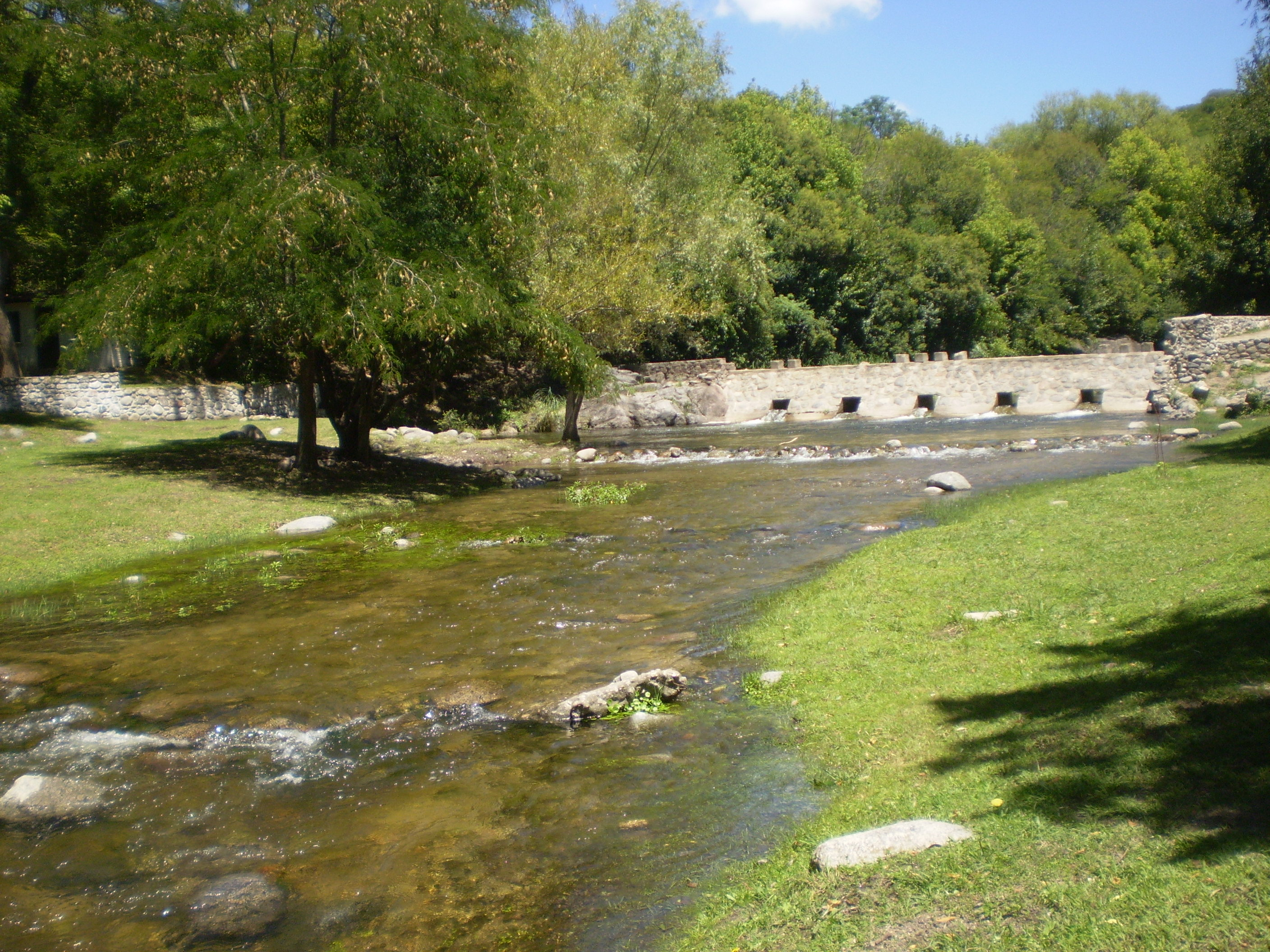

- Location within Córdoba Province
- Coordinates: 31°00′33″S 64°16′07″W
- Country: Argentina
- Province: Córdoba
- Department: Colón Department

Government
  - Intendant: Miguel Pittaro

Population (2022)
  - Total: 4,805
- Time zone: UTC−3 (ART)
- Website: www.lagranja.gob.ar

La Granja is a town located in the Colón Department of the province of Córdoba in central Argentina, north of the provincial capital Córdoba, on the northern end of the Sierras Chicas mountain range, making it a tourist destination for inner-Argentine tourism.

== Geography ==
The town is located about 53 km north of the city of Córdoba and the provincial road E53 runs through the town, which connects it to the towns of Agua de Oro to the south and Ascochinga to the north. In addition to the town center, the localities of Villa Ani Mi and Las Vertientes de la Granja are part of the municipality.

The Tiú Mayu stream flows through the town. Parts of the bed have been declared as an urban natural reserve, providing a short hiking trail.

== Population ==
In the 2010 census, the population of La Granja was 2,456 according to the INDEC. By the 2022 census, this number had grown to 4805 inhabitants.

== Locality ==
Tourism is one of the main sources of economic activity in the town, which offers in particular nature related activities around the river and mountains. Along the river Tiú Mayu, various natural pools and beaches exist, alongside the La Toma balneario which additionally offers spots for barbecues.

The town has a health center with specialists offering appointments on different days and offers its own public transport service called "Munibus".

The town also its own cooperative for providing public services, which was founded in 1952 and also covers the communities in Las Vertientes, Villa Ani Mi and Los Molles.

Since 1995, the town also has its own volunteer firefighter group.
