= Jesús María, Argentina =

Jesús María
- City
- Location of Jesús María in Argentina
- Coordinates: 30°59′S 64°6′W
- Country: Argentina
- Province: Córdoba
- Department: Colón

Government
  - Intendant: Federico Zárate (LLA)

Area
  - Total: 7,917 ha (19,560 acres)
- 2023 Municipal report
- Elevation: 530 m (1,740 ft)

Population (2022 census)
  - Total: 36,461
  - Density: 460.5/km^{2} (1,193/sq mi)
- Time zone: UTC−3 (ART)
- CPA base: X5220
- Dialing code: +54 3525

Jesús María is a city in the province of Córdoba, Argentina, located 49 km due north from the provincial capital Córdoba, on National Route 9 and provincial road E66. It is located within the valley of the Sierras Chicas. It has about 36,000 inhabitants as per the 2022 census [INDEC].

== History ==
The origin of the city was a ranch (estancia) founded by missionaries of the Society of Jesus in 1618 around Pedro de Oñate, located among the road to the capital of the viceroyalty. The estancia dedicated itself to producing wine The estancia and convent are not far from today's city and have been preserved, hosting the National Jesuit Museum.

The city itself grew in the late 19th century, around the development of the Argentine railway. In 1872, the national government started the construction of the Central-Northern Railway Line, leading to the founding of a city. In 1878, the provincial government announced the formation of the town of Jesús María, by in 1946 it had grown to the point to be officially declared city.

In 1987, the city declared the 28th of September 1873 as the official day of the city foundation. In 2015, the city declared the 15th of January 1618 as the "day of origin".

== Economy ==
In 2023, companies based out of Jesús María recorded a revenue of around 369 million Argentine pesos between April and October.

The city is an agricultural center for the production of maize, lentils, broad beans, peas, chickpeas and saffron.

== Tourism ==
Annually since 1966, during ten days in January, the city hosts the Festival Nacional de la Doma y el Folclore (Horse Training and Folklore Festival), which today gathers hundreds of thousands national and international attendants. In 2026, the festival attracted 450,000 visitors, declaring a turn-over of 106,000 million Argentine pesos. The festival is held in the José Hernández stadium located close to the downtown core of the city. Among street vendors and side shows, the festival features a celebration of old Gaucho culture.

The Jesuit Block and Estancias of Córdoba were named World Heritage Site in 2000. The city also has a town museum, as well as hiking routes in a natural reserve close by.

== Notable residents ==
- Susana Cabuchi (1948-2022), writer and poet
