= Instituto de Astronomía Teórica y Experimental =

Argentine research institute

- Acronym: IATE
- Established: 2006
- Director: Dr. Nelson Padilla
- Address: Laprida 922
- City: Córdoba
- State: Provincia de Córdoba
- Country: Argentina
- Coordinates: 31°25′16″S 64°11′59″W
- Web Site: Official website
- e-mail: iate@oac.unc.edu.ar

The Instituto de Astronomía Teórica y Experimental (IATE) is a scientific institute funded by the Consejo Nacional de Investigaciones en Científicas y Técnicas (CONICET) and the Universidad Nacional de Córdoba (UNC), located in the city of Córdoba, Argentina, and dedicated to the study of different topics in astronomy. The headquarters of the institute are located at the Observatorio Astronómico de Córdoba.

== History ==
In the 1960s, Dr. José Luis Sérsic (Argentinian scientist mainly known for his empirical law for the intensity of a galaxy called Sersic's Law) created the extragalactic astronomy department at the Observatorio Astronómico de Córdoba, where he developed his academic and research activities, forming his first disciples. In 1983, the department became the "Programa de Investigaciones en Astronomía Teórica y Experimental" (IATE), funded by CONICET, under Dr. Sérsic direction. Following the death of Dr. Sérsic on July 19, 1993, the program was discontinued. However, those graduates and PhD who were trained under his tutelage were ordered to continue with the group IATE as a research group within the Observatorio Astronómico, under the leadership of Dr. Diego Garcia Lambas, one of the main disciples of Dr. Sérsic. After more than 10 years of hard work forming graduates, PhD and researchers, and to become one of the most numerous research groups within the Observatorio Astronómico, the IATE group became one of the institutes of CONICET in 2006, with Dr. Diego Garcia Lambas being its first director. The institute then took the name of Instituto de Astronomía Teórica y Experimental, retaining the acronym IATE. Dr. Diego Garcia Lambas was the director of the institute during the period 2006-2021. In the year 2022, Dr. Nelson Padilla was designated to assume the direction of the IATE.

The building of the institute located at the Observatorio Astronómico de Córdoba.

== Members ==
At the IATE, there are 38 Ph.D. in the researcher career of CONICET, 30 Ph.D. and postdoctoral fellows, 7 members of the support staff career of CONICET, 1 contract staff, and 2 graduates and Ph.D. working at the institute.

Abadi, Mario	Cerioni, Matías	Ferreiro, Diego	Marioni, Ornela	Renzi, Víctor	Stasyszyn, Federico
Alfaro, Germán	Chalela García, Martín	García Lambas, Diego	Martínez, Héctor Julián	Rodríguez, Agustín	Taverna, Antonela
Alonso, María Victoria	Coenda, Valeria	Gianuzzi, Emanuel	Merchán, Manuel	Rodríguez, Facundo	Tissera, Patricia
Andrada, Lúcas	Colazo, Milagros	Giuppone, Cristian	Muriel, Hernán	Rodríguez, Horacio	Valotto, Carlos
Baravalle, Laura	Correa, Carlos	Gonzalez, Elizabeth	O'Mill, Ana Laura	Rost, Agustín	Vega Neme, Luis
Beaugé, Cristian	Costa, Andrea	Granato, Gian Luigi	Oio, Gabriel	Rubio, Marcelo	Vena Valdarenas, Román
Benavides Blanco, José	Cristiani, Valeria	Graña, Darío	Padilla, Nelson	Ruíz, Andrés	Villalón, Carolina
Bertazzi, Viviana	Dávila, Federico	Gualpa, Sebastián	Parisi, Celeste	Sahade, Abril	Villarreal D'Angelo, Carolina
Boero, Ezequiel	Daza, Vanessa	Gurovich, Sebastián	Paz, Dante	Salerno, Juan	Volpe, Gabriela
Bornancini, Carlos	Díaz-Giménez, Eugenia	Kozameh, Nicolas	Pereyra, Luis	Santucho, Victoria	Vrech, Rubén
Cabral, Juan	Díaz, Mario	Lares, Marcelo	Racker, Juan	Schneiter, Matías	Yaryura, Yamila
Cécere, Mariana	Domínguez, Mariano	López, Pablo	Ragone Figueroa, Cinthia	Sgró, Mario	Zandivarez, Ariel
Ceccarelli, Laura	Donzelli, Carlos	Luparello, Heliana	Ramirez, Marcos	Sillero, Emanuel	Zopetti, Federico

== Scientific Areas ==
The lines of research are:

- Galactic and Extragalactic Astronomy
- Large Scale Structure of the Universe
- Planetary Systems
- Astrophysical Plasmas
- Stellar Astrophysics
- Instrumental Astronomy and Site Testing

=== Galactic and Extragalactic Astronomy ===
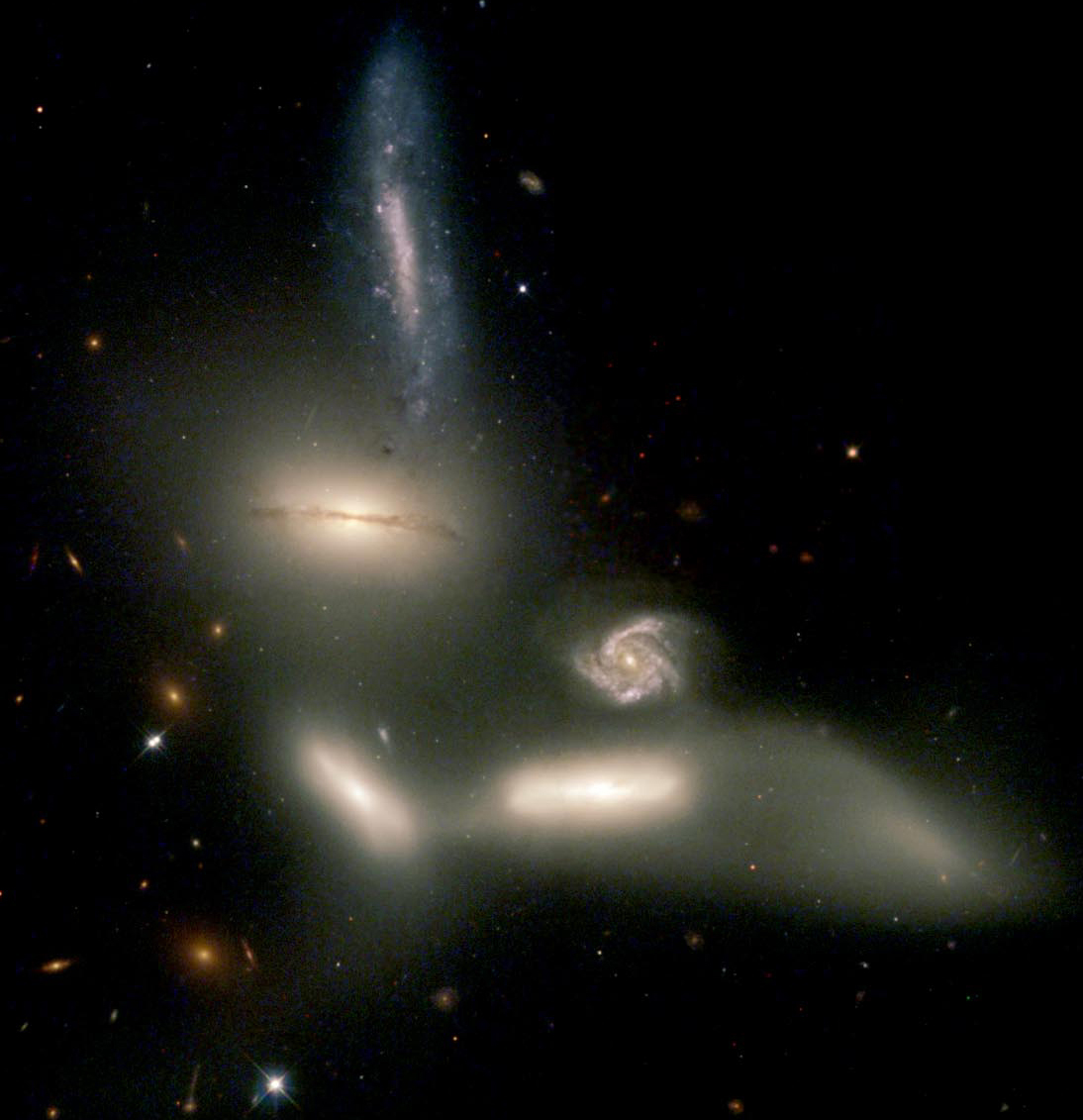
The Seyfert's Sextet

The 13.8 billion years of the Universe is enough time to form giant objects, being the galaxies one of the most interesting. Galaxies are truly island universes where dark matter, billions of stars and huge amounts of gas and dust coexist in equilibrium, and yet, they are an environment suitable for the formation of new stars. Galaxies also tend to cluster in a network of cosmic proportions which highlights fabulous large structures formed by thousands of galaxies. At the IATE, the study of galaxies has been a constant challenge, which has allowed to consolidate over the years different methods for the study of the formation and evolution of galaxies. Some of the most important are:

- Numerical Simulations: the physical processes that govern the evolutionary history of one or many galaxies are recreated by using supercomputers:
- Statistical Studies: properties of galaxies are inferred and analysed from large data surveys;
- Astronomical Observations: classic observations and the most modern and sophisticated techniques are combined by using the telescope facilities around the world.

These and other tools are used by different scientists at the IATE to perform original and reliable astronomical research.

=== Large Scale Structure of the Universe ===
Numerical simulation of a CDM universe with dark energy (Andrey Kravtsov and Anatoly Klypin)

The large-scale structure of the Universe is the field of cosmology that studies the distribution of the matter in the Universe on the largest scales. This field has grown remarkably since the '80s, with the development of three-dimensional maps of galaxies in several bands of the electromagnetic spectrum, and with the observation of the Cosmic Microwave Background (CMB). The increasing flow of information generated by observations has allowed to obtain reliable characterization of the content of the universe comprising

- 74% of vacuum or dark energy,
- 26% dark matter and
- 4% ordinary baryonic matter,

as well as its distribution. The distribution of the structures seems to follow a hierarchical model where the upper level is dominated by a network of clusters and filaments. On top of that, the universe appears to be isotropic and homogeneous in accordance with the cosmological principle. From the analysis of catalogs and the development of numerical simulations, the distribution is characterized through the implementation of different statistics that allow the study of the spatial distribution as well as the dynamics by means of the velocity field of the matter distribution.

=== Planetary Systems ===
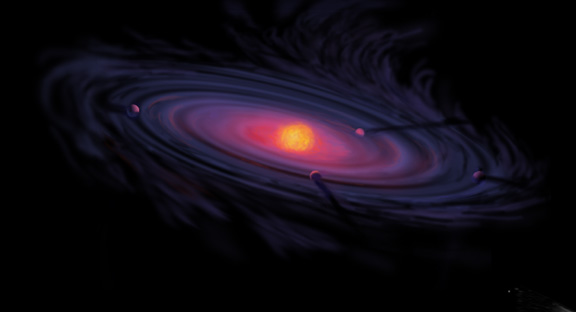
Artist's concept of a protoplanetary disk.

The question of the existence of other worlds has been present in the history of mankind for centuries, but only recent scientific evidence has confirmed that planets could exist and are common outside the Solar System. Since the first discovery in 1992, over 850 new exoplanets have been cataloged. Contrary to the Solar System, exoplanets' population presents several examples of exoplanets at very small distances from its stars, highly eccentric planetary orbits, and they are frequently found in configurations not previously imagined. This led to the development of new theories and areas of research, which ultimately can help us to better understand the Solar System. Some of the projects that are currently being developed at the IATE include:

- Analyses of observational data for exoplanets (radial velocity and transit);
- Models of tidal interaction with the central star to study the origin of the population of "hot" exoplanets
- Study of the dynamics of extrasolar planets in mean motions resonances;
- Development of hydrodynamic codes to describe the interaction between planets and the protoplanetary disk;
- Analyses of the formation of planets in binary stellar systems.

=== Astrophysical Plasmas ===
An eruptive prominence on the surface of the Sun.

The plasma is the most common state of the baryonic matter in the Universe (99%). Most of a star, the interplanetary and interstellar medium, and the ionosphere, are plasmas. The plasma can also be generated in terrestrial laboratories for industrial applications such as producing surface coatings, precision cuts in lamps, micro-motors, and plasma reactors. A plasma is a fluid consisting of a large number of free charged particles (globally neutral and whose kinetic energy is larger than the electrostatic potential energy between them). The charges and currents that conform a plasma are sources of the electromagnetic fields and, in turn, these fields affect the distribution of charges and currents which makes its dynamics highly nonlinear and very different from that of a neutral gas. When the magnetic fields are capable of modifying an individual particle trajectory, it is said that the plasma is magnetized. The corona is highly magnetized and therefore, several structures are observed, some of which can maintain its stability for relatively long times as dark filaments on the surface of the Sun. In the group of astrophysical plasmas, our scientist perform studies about the dynamic configuration and structures of the corona through the analysis of magnetic arcs and prominences, the formation of voids that remain in the plasma due to the interaction of nonlinear waves, the formation of very energetic shock wave capable of sweeping the chromosphere along a whole quadrant, etc. The team also analyse the interaction of stellar winds with the magnetosphere of exoplanets, and they model the morphology of supernova remnants affected by instabilities and the influence of the magnetic field.

=== Stellar Astrophysics ===
The Universe is full of stars and most of them form stellar systems and associations. Among the many stellar systems that can be observed, star clusters (SCs) are among the objects whose research is relevant in a wide variety of astrophysical studies. Just to mention some examples, the SCs are important for Stellar Astrophysics: since it allows to test the star formation and evolutionary models; for Galactic and Extragalactic Astronomy: as tracers of the structure, formation history and chemical evolution of the different components of the Milky Way, and of galaxies in general; for Dynamics: since the interaction between galaxies leaves distinctive marks on the global astrophysical properties of their SCs systems; for Cosmology: imposing restrictions on cosmological models, because, for example, no model can predict the age of the Universe incompatible with the age of the oldest SCs, which are among the first stellar systems formed in the early Universe; etc. Currently, the projects included in this area are mainly related to the study of Galactic and Extragalactic SCs. They focus on the study of the chemical and kinematic properties of the SC system belonging to the bulge of the Milky Way, the Magellanic Clouds and of the farthest galaxies. SCs are used as tracers of the formation history, chemical evolution and dynamical history of their host components. These observational studies apply spectroscopic and photometric techniques based on specific data, obtained with different instruments, mainly on the GEMINI telescopes (Cerro Pachón, Chile) and VLT (Cerro Paranal, Chile), among others.

=== Site Testing ===
The IATE also performs site testing for the installation of large astronomical facilities in the Argentinian territory. During the 90's (1989-1998), the IATE began the first work on astronomical site testing performing seeing measurements in the Antarctic Base Belgrano II. In 1998, measurements of seeing were performed in the Llano de Chajnantor, Atacama (Chile), as part of a project aimed at installing a liquid mercury telescope in Toco volcano. This project was not successful but the group learnt the use of the most modern technologies for measuring sky parameters. Through this experience, the IATE made contact with Dr. Marc Sarazin, of the European Southern Observatory (ESO), with whom, since the year 2000, the IATE began the searching and characterization of candidate sites to install the European Extremely Large Telescope (E-ELT), which will be finally installed in Chile, at the Cerro Armazones. During that work, a suitable candidate site was preselected at the Cordón Macón, close to Tolar Grande town. Because of its excellent conditions, the IATE decided to install observational facilities at this site, which is the most important project to date for the instrumentation team. The project also involves the development of a program committed to the educational public outreach in astronomy at the town of Tolar Grande, named Ñawi Puna.

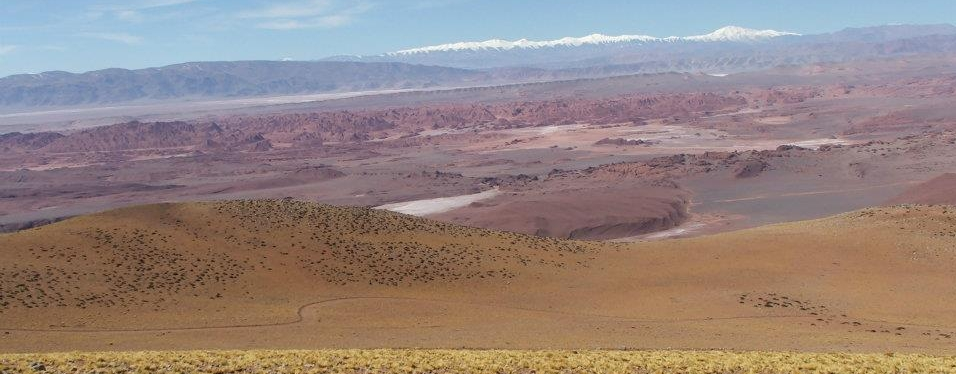
View from the Macón peak at the Cordón Macón, Salta, Argentina.

==== The New Astronomical Complex ====
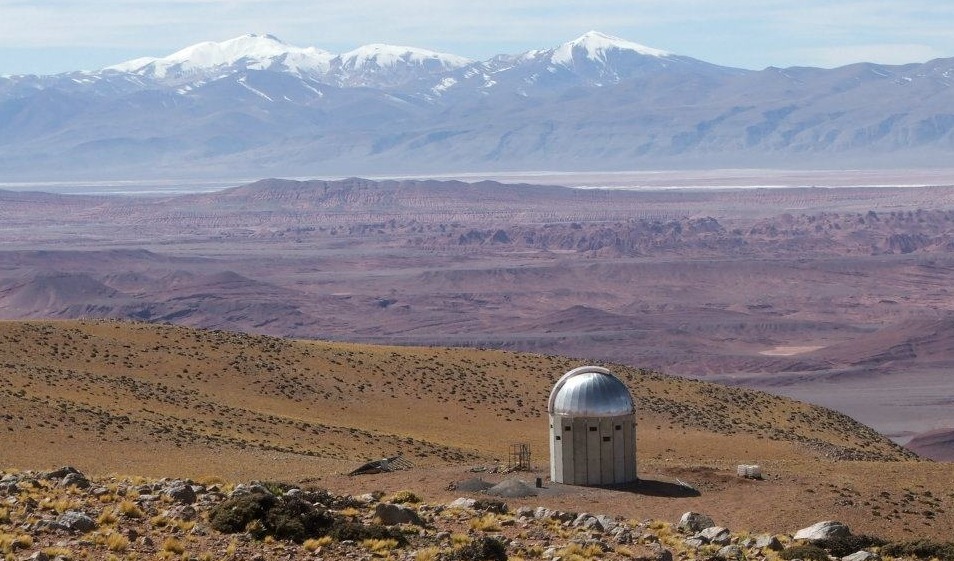
The first observatory building at the Macón peak (May, 2012).

The IATE is building an astronomical complex on the Cordón Macón, located at 10 km from the town of Tolar Grande, Salta, Argentina. The site is located at latitude 24.61 South and longitude 67.32 West and at an altitude of 4,650 meters. The location has ideal conditions of humidity and air turbulence, which create almost perfect astronomical seeing. The site infrastructure will enable the development of several observational projects:

- The ABRAS project: The Argentina-Brasil Astronomical Center is a project involving both Latin-American countries. The main institutions behind the project are the IATE, from Argentina, and the IAG (Instituto de Astronomia, Geofísica e Ciencias Atmosféricas), from São Paulo, Brasil, while the funding institutions are the Ministerio de Ciencia, Tecnología e Innovación Productiva and the University of São Paulo (Universidade de São Paulo, USP). The project involves the installation of an astronomical observational facility in the Cordón Macón. The 1 meter telescope will be installed in an 8-meter diameter dome. The building and the installation of the dome was performed during 2011–2012, while the 1 meter telescope arrived to Córdoba (Argentina) during October 2015. One of the main goals of the project is to optimize the telescope for performing astronomical observations in the infrared part of the electromagnetic spectrum. The first observations with this telescope is expected to be perform for the year 2016.
- The TOROS project: The Transient Optical Robotic Observatory of the South (TOROS) project is a collaboration among scientists from The University of Texas at Brownsville, the Universidad Nacional de Cordoba (UNC), CALTECH and Texas A&M University. The project intend to construct a dedicated optical follow-up instrument for Advanced LIGO (aLIGO) and Advanced Virgo (AdVirgo) in order to surveying the sky for even very dim afterglows of gravitational waves events. The project also pursuit the aim of detecting nearby supernovas. The first workshop of the TOROS collaboration was held in the city of Salta, Argentina, in June, 2013.
- The ISON project: The International Scientific Optical Network (ISON) program is an international effort that intend to understand and catalogue the space debris population in the near-Earth space and of potentially hazardous Near Earth Objects (NEOs). In order to contribute to this program, the Keldysh Institute of Applied Mathematics (KIAM) of the Russian Academy of Sciences (RAS), of the Russian Federation, will work together with the Comisión Nacional de Actividades Espaciales (CONAE), the IATE, the Observatorio Astronómico de Córdoba (OAC) and the Government of the Provincia de Salta in Argentina, to install and operate two small telescopes of 20 and 25 cm of diameter, that will be operated remotely via Internet connection. The aim of this cooperation is to perform observations of orbital debris, asteroids, comets and optical counterparts of gamma-ray bursts.

== International FoF meetings ==
Yearly, the IATE organizes the astronomical meeting named "Friends-of-Friends", usually carried out during the first fortnight of April. The meeting is aimed at stretching the bonds between the astronomers that work at the IATE and their external collaborators, as well as sharing the state-of-the-art of works that are being developed by the IATE members. The talks are split into two different modes: invited speakers present talks of 45+15 minutes, while there are several short talks of 15+5 minutes long.

Year	Invited speakers (Affiliation)
2011	Gary Mamon (IAP, Paris, France), Juan Madrid (CAS, SUT, Melbourne, Australia), Norbert Przybilla (AI, FAU, Erlangen, Germany), Dante Minniti (PUC, Santiago, Chile), Gian Luigi Granato (INAF, Padova, Italy), Osvaldo Moreschi (FAMAF-UNC, Córdoba, Argentina)
2012	Nelson Padilla (PUC, Santiago, Chile), Lucas Macri (TAMU, Texas, EE.UU.), Dante Minniti (PUC, Santiago, Chile), Carlos Briozzo (FAMAF-UNC, Córdoba, Argentina), Robert Proctor (IAG, São Paulo, Brazil)
2013	Daniel Gómez (IAFE, UBA, Buenos Aires, Arg.), Dante Minniti (PUC, Santiago, Chile), Christian Moni-Bidin (IAUCN, Antofagasta, Chile), Mario Díaz (UTB, Brownsville, EE.UU.), Sofía Cora (FCAG, UNLP, La Plata, Arg.), Federico Stasyszyn (USM, Munich, Germany), Facundo Gómez (UM, Ann Arbor, EE.UU.), Nelson Padilla (PUC, Santiago, Chile), Alessio Romeo (UAB, Santiago, Chile), Osvaldo Moreschi (FAMAF-UNC, Córdoba, Argentina), Ezequiel Treister (UC, Concepción, Chile), Patricia Tissera (IAFE, UBA, Buenos Aires, Arg.)
2014	Osvaldo Moreschi (FAMAF-UNC, Córdoba, Argentina), Nelson Padilla (PUC, Santiago, Chile), Douglas Geisler (UC, Concepción, Chile), Cesar Bertucci (IAFE, UBA, Buenos Aires, Arg.), Pablo Dmitruk (DF-UBA, Buenos Aires, Arg.), Lilia Bassino (FCAG, UNLP, La Plata, Arg.), Daniel Carpintero (FCAG, UNLP, La Plata, Arg.), Juan Carlos Forte (FCAG, UNLP, La Plata, Arg.), Sergio Elaskar (FCEFyN-UNC, Córdoba, Arg.), Paul Matthew Sutter (IAP, Paris, France), Rory Smith (UC, Concepción, Chile)
2015	Mario Díaz (UTB, Brownsville, EE.UU.), Osvaldo Moreschi (FAMAF-UNC, Córdoba, Argentina), Dante Minniti (PUC, Santiago, Chile), Omar López Cruz (INAOE, México), Georgina Coldwell (UNSJ, San Juan, Argentina), Sergio Cellone (FCAG, UNLP, La Plata, Arg.), Noam Liberskind (AIP, Potsdam, Germany), Gian Luigi Granato (INAF, Padova, Italy), Cristina Mandrini (IAFE, UBA, Buenos Aires, Arg.), Daniel Gomez (IAFE, UBA, Buenos Aires, Arg.), Carlos Carrasco (CRYA, México), Mario Daniel Melita (IAFE, UBA, Buenos Aires, Arg.), Carlos Colazo (OAC, Córdoba, Argentina), Nelson Padilla (PUC, Santiago, Chile), Lucas Macri (TAMU, Texas, EE.UU.), Stefan Gottloeber (AIP, Potsdam, Germany), Claudia Mendes de Oliveira (IAG, São Paulo, Brazil)
2016	Sofía Cora (FCAG, UNLP, La Plata, Arg.), Georgina Coldwell (UNSJ, San Juan, Argentina), Stefano Cristiani (INAF, Padova, Italy), Giuseppe Murante (INAF, Padova, Italy), Gian Luigi Granato (INAF, Padova, Italy), Laerte Sodré (IAG, São Paulo, Brazil), Rosa Domínguez Tenreiro (UAM, Madrid, Spain), Lilia Bassino (FCAG, UNLP, La Plata, Arg.), María Fernanda Nievas (University of Innsbruck, Austria), Omar López Cruz (INAOE, México), Mario Díaz (UTB, Brownsville, EE.UU.), Arianna Di Cintio (DCC, Copenhagen, Denmark), Lucas Macri (TAMU, Texas, EE.UU.), Sergio Dasso (IAFE, UBA, Buenos Aires, Arg.), Mario Melita (IAFE, UBA, Buenos Aires, Arg.), Octavio Guilera (FCAG, UNLP, La Plata, Arg.), Gustavo Romero (IAR, Buenos Aires, Argentina)
2017	Javier Alonso-García (UANTOF, Antofagasta, Chile), Álvaro Alvarez Candal (ON, Río de Janeiro, Brazil), Marcelo Arnal (FCAG, UNLP, La Plata, Arg.), Michael Balogh (University of Waterloo, Canada), Jura Borissova (IFA, Valparaiso, Chile), Francesco Di Mille (LCO, La Serena, Chile), Alejandro Esquivel (UNAM, DF, México), Stefan Gottloeber (AIP, Potsdam, Germany), Gian Luigi Granato (INAF, Padova, Italy), Yara Jaffé (ESO, Santiago, Chile), Yolanda Jiménez Teja (ON, Río de Janeiro, Brazil), Radostin Kurtev (IFA, Valparaiso, Chile), Gastão Lima Neto (IAG, São Paulo, Brazil), Martín Makler (CBPF, Río de Janeiro, Brazil), Sebastián Nuza (IAFE, UBA, Buenos Aires, Arg.), Nelson Padilla (PUC, Santiago, Chile), Karla Peña Ramírez (UANTOF, Antofagasta, Chile), Manolis Plionis (NOA, Athens, Greece), Sebastián Ramírez Alegría (IFA, Valparaiso, Chile), Adrián Rovero (IAFE, UBA, Buenos Aires, Arg.), Cecilia Scannapieco (DF, UBA, Buenos Aires, Arg.), Cai Yan-Chuan (ROE, Edinburgh, Scotland), Gustavo Yepes (UAM, Madrid, Spain)
2018	Roberto González (PUC, Santiago, Chile), Segio Cellone (FCAG, UNLP, La Plata, Arg.), Stanley Kurtz (UNAM, DF, México), Sandro Villanova (UC, Concepción, Chile), Lidia Cydale (FCAG, UNLP, La Plata, Arg.), Roberto Muñoz (PUC, Santiago, Chile), Fernando Roig (ON, Río de Janeiro, Brazil), Rodrigo Díaz (IAFE, UBA, Buenos Aires, Arg.), Cristina Cappa (IAR, Buenos Aires, Arg.), Joaquín Prieto (DAS, Santiago, Chile), Jorge Cuadra (PUC, Santiago, Chile)
2019	Laura Silva (OATS, Trieste, Italy), Hebe Cremades (UTN-FRM, Mendoza, Arg.), Anabella Araudo (CAS, Czech Republic), Rogério Riffel (UFRGS, Río Grande do Sul, Brazil), Veronica Firpo (Gemini, USA), Celine Boehm (USyd, Australia), Pablo Benítez-Llambay (UCop, Copenhagen, Denmark), Cristian Giuppone (OAC, Córdoba, Arg.), Dainis Dravins (LO, Sweden), Marcelo Rubio (FAMAF-UNC, Córdoba, Arg.), Jiri Horak (CAS, Czech Republic), Javier Minniti (PUC, Santiago, Chile), Luca Pasquini (ESO, Germany), Andrea Biviano (OATS, Trieste, Italy), Edoardo Carlesi (AIP, Potsdam, Germany), Martín Makler (CBPF, Brazil), Omar López-Cruz (INAOE, México), Gabriela González (LSU, Louisiana, USA), Marica Branchesi (GSSI, Italy), Lucas Macri (TAMU, Texas, USA), Daniel Siegel (Columbia, USA), Luis Lehner (PI, Canada), Cecilia Chirenti (UFABC, Brazil), Efrain Ferrer (CUNY, New York, USA), Sofía Cora (FCAG, La Plata, Arg.), Laura Sales (UC, California, USA), Alejandro Benítez-Llambay (UDur, Durham, United Kingdom), Cecilia Scoccola (FCAG, UNLP, La Plata, Arg.), Adam Hawken (BRERA, Italy)
2021	Laura Sales (UC, California, USA), Ismael Ferrero (UIO, Oslo, Noruega), Raúl Angulo (IKERBASQUE, Spain), Alejandro Benítez-Llambay (UDur, Durham, United Kingdom), Gary Mamon (IAP, Paris, France), Gian Luigi Granato (INAF, Padova, Italy), Maria da Silva Pereira (UMICH, Michigan, USA), Alejandro Esquivel (UNAM, DF, México), Bruno Días (UTA, Chile), Mercedes Vazzano (IAR, Bs.As., Arg.), Ricardo Gil-Hutton (UNSJ, San Juan, Arg.), Hebe Cremades (UTN-FRM, Mendoza, Arg.), Miriam Peña (IAUNAM, México), Omar López-Cruz (INAOE, México), Marcelo Miller Bertolami (IALP, La Plata, Arg.), Ilia Musco (SUR, Rome, Italy), Thiago Signorini Gonçalves (OV, Rio de Janeiro, Brazil)
2022	Antonio Montero Dorta (UTFSM, Valparaiso, Chile), Mariana Penna Lima Vitenti (UnB, Brasilia, Brasil), Elizabeth Artur de la Villarmois (IAPUC, Santiago, Chile), Miriam del Carmen Peña Cárdenas (IAUNAM, DF, México), Patricia Tissera (IAPUC, Santiago, Chile), José Benavides Blanco (IATE, Córdoba, Arg.), Gaspar Galaz (PUC, Santiago, Chile), Thiago Signorini Gonçalves (OV, Rio de Janeiro, Brazil), Karín Menéndez-Delmestre (OV, Rio de Janeiro, Brazil), Celeste Artale (DFA, Padova, Italy), Marcelo Miller Bertolami (IALP, La Plata, Arg.), Vladimir Avila-Reese (IAUNAM, DF, México)
2023	Yael Aidelman (National University of La Plata, Arg.), Anabella Araudo (Montpellier Universe and Particles Laboratory (LUPM), France), Cecilia Fariña (Isaac Newton Group of Telescopes, Spain), Veronica Firpo (Gemini Observatory, Chile), Andrea Fortier (University of Bern, Switzerland), Nicolas Garavito-Camargo (Flatiron Institute, USA), Facundo Gomez (University of La Serena, Chile), Anahí Granada (Universidad Nacional de Rio Negro (UNRN), Arg.), Gian Luigi Granato (Astronomical Observatory of Trieste, Italy), Jirka Horak (Astronomical Institute of the Czech Academy of Sciences, Czech Republic), Daniel Horta (Flatiron Institute, USA), Cecilia Mateu (Universidad de La República Uruguay, Uruguay), Antonela Monachesi (University of La Serena, Chile), Miriam Peña (Instituto de Astronomia UNAM, UNAM, México), Claudia Scoccola (National University of La Plata, Arg.)
2024	Maren Hempel (Andrés Bello National University, Chile), Gaspar Galaz (Instituto de Astrofisica (PUC), Chile), Ana Pichel (IAFE, Arg.), Melissa Hobson (Observatoire de Geneve, Switzerland), Alejandro Benitez-Llambay (University of Milano-Bicocca, Italy), Nicolás Wolovick (CCAD, Arg.), Mario Soto Vicencio (INCT, Chile), Alejandra Muñoz Arancibia (CMM, Chile), Roberto Galvan Madrid (IRyA, Mexico), Alejandro Esquivel (ICN, UNAM, Mexico)
2025	Jailson Alcaniz (Observatorio Nacional, Brasil), Maria Celeste Artale (Universidad Andres Bello, Chile), Gustavo Bruzual (IRyA, Mexico), Denise R. Gonçalves (Observatorio do Valongo, Brasil), Luis Gutiérrez-Soto (IALP, La Plata, Arg.), Omar López-Cruz (INAOE, Mexico), Marcelo Miller Bertolami (IALP, La Plata, Arg.), Javier Minniti (Johns Hopkins University, USA), Sergio Parón (IAFE, Arg.), Carlos Saffe (ICATE, Arg.), Claudia Scóccola (DFI, Chile), María Valeria Sieyra (CEA Paris-Saclay, France), Rodrigo Sousa Gonçalves (UFRRJ, Brasil), Mario Sucerquia (Université Grenoble Alpes, France), Hermano Velten (FUOP, Brasil), Tomás Verdugo (IAE, Mexico), Jhon Yana-Galarza (Carengie Observatories, USA), Alice Zurlo (Diego Portales University, Chile)

Edition	Year	LOC Members
I	2011	Eugenia Díaz-Giménez, Cinthia Ragone Figueroa, Ariel Zandivarez, José Nilo Castellón, Heliana Luparello, Viviana Bertazzi, Diego García Lambas
II	2012	Marcela Pacheco, Andrés Ruiz, Ernesto Zurbriggen, José Nilo Castellón, Dario Graña, Viviana Bertazzi, Eugenia Díaz-Giménez, Diego García Lambas
III	2013	Mario Sgró, Ismael Ferrero, Diego García Lambas
IV	2014	David Algorry, Ernesto Zurbriggen, Andrea Costa, Diego García Lambas
V	2015	Facundo Rodriguez, Adriana Rodriguez Kamenetzky, Elizabeth Gonzalez, Andrea Costa, Diego García Lambas
VI	2016	Mario Abadi, Valeria Coenda, Gian Luigi Granato, Julián Martinez, Cinthia Ragone Figueroa, Viviana Bertazzi, Andrea Costa, Diego García Lambas
VII^{♦}	2017	Viviana Bertazzi, Mariana Cécere, Mariano Dominguez, Luciana Gramajo, Damián Mast, Luis Pereyra, Emanuel Sillero, Tania Tagliaferro, Antonela Taverna
VIII^{♦}	2018	Viviana Bertazzi, Carolina Charalambous, Guillermo Gunthardt, Ma. José Kanagusuku, Marcelo Lares, Pablo López, Celeste Parisi, Andrés Ruiz
IX^{♦}	2019	Viviana Bertazzi, Ezequiel Boero, Martin Chalela, Gaia Gaspar, Heliana Luparello, Belén Mari, Mario Agustín Sgró, Yamila Yaryura
-	2020	Cancelled in line with local and international measures being taken due to COVID-19 pandemic.
X^{♦}	2021	Viviana Bertazzi, Juan Cabral, Laura Ceccarelli, Federico Dávila, Ornela Marioni, Gabriel Oio, Dante Paz, Walter Weidmann
XI^{♦}	2022	Viviana Bertazzi, Valeria Cristiani, Carlos Correa, Vanessa Daza, Eugenia Díaz-Giménez, Leticia Ferrero, Sebastián Gurovich, Damián Mast, Rafael Pignata, Agustín Rodríguez, Federico Stasyszyn
XII^{♦}	2023	Viviana Bertazzi, Javier Ahumada, Sebastían Gualpa, Juan Racker
XIII^{♦}	2024	Viviana Bertazzi, Laura Baravalle, Emiliano Jofré, Adriana Rodriguez Kamenetzky, Cecilia Ortiz, Romina Petrucci, Carlos Valotto, Carolina Villalon, Carolina Villarreal D'Angelo, Ernesto Zurbriggen
XIV^{♦}	2025	Viviana Bertazzi, Cristian Beauge, Carlos Bornancini, Jorge Bustillos Rava, Cintia Martinez, Sebastián Gualpa, Belen Mari, Cecilia Ortiz, Facundo Toscano, Luis Vega, Federico Zopetti

^{♦} These editions were organized jointly with the Observatorio Astronómico de Córdoba

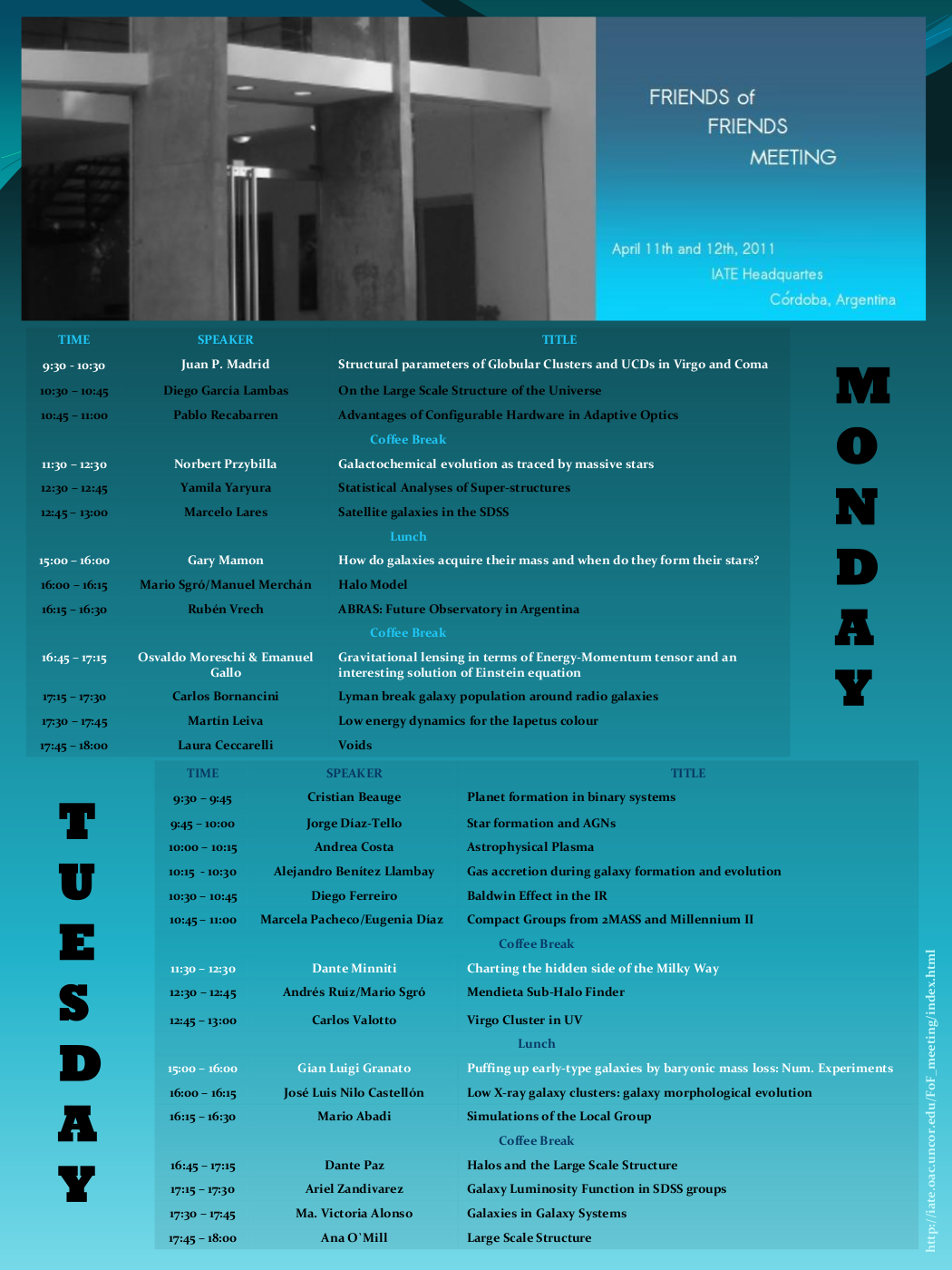
Poster of the 1st FoF meeting (2011)

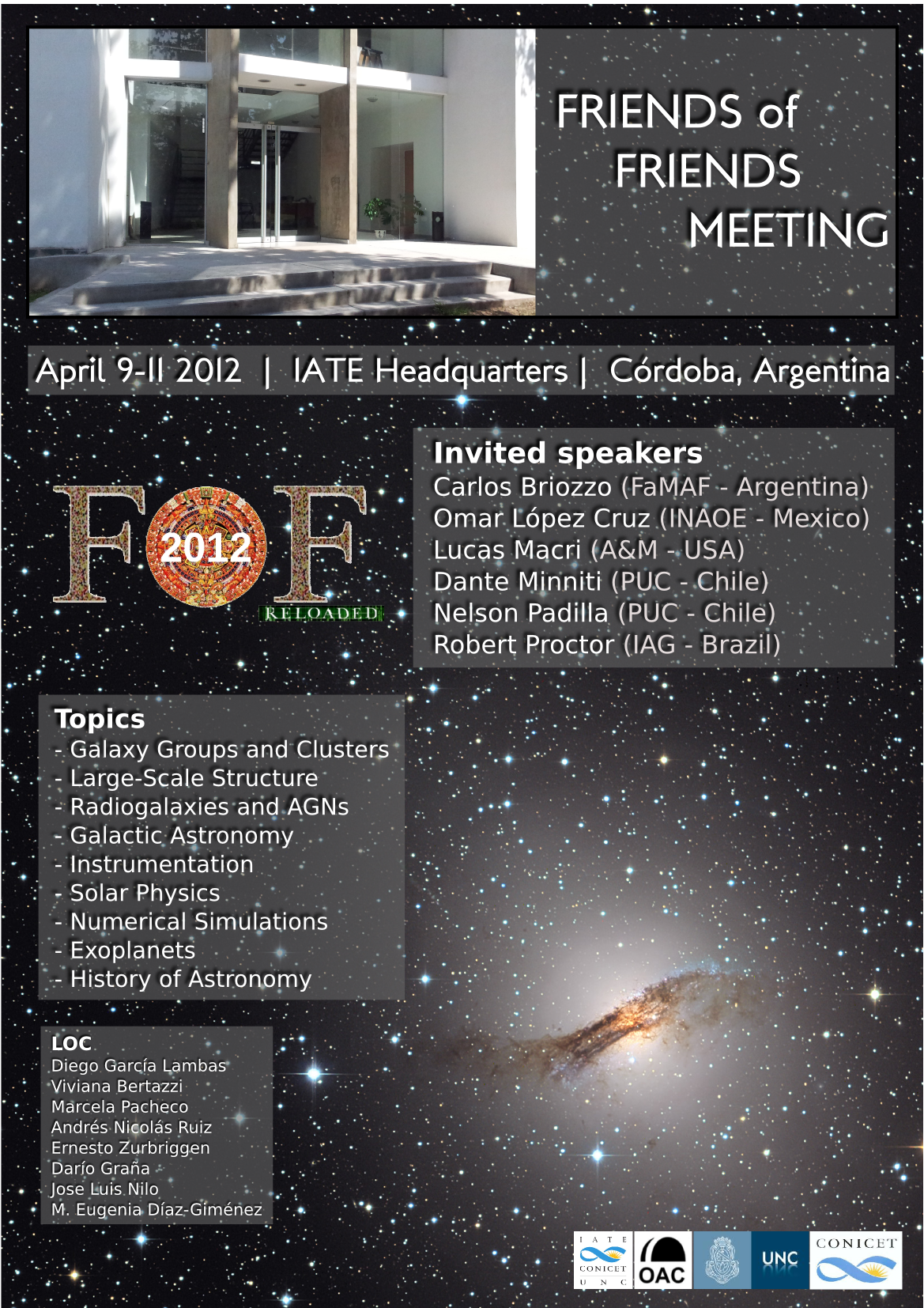
Poster of the 2nd FoF meeting (2012)

Poster of the 3rd FoF meeting (2013)
