= Alfredo Rodríguez (disambiguation) =

Alfredo Rodríguez (1936–2005) was a Cuban pianist.

Alfredo Rodríguez may also refer to:

- Alfredo Rodríguez Ballón (1906–1933), Peruvian aviation pioneer, for whom Rodríguez Ballón International Airport in Arequipa is named
- Alfredo Rodríguez (baseball) (born 1994), Cuban baseball shortstop
- Alfredo Rodríguez Dávila (born 1969), Mexican politician from Nuevo León
- Alfredo Rodríguez y Pacheco (born 1959), Mexican politician from Yucatán
- Alfredo Rodríguez (pianist, born 1985) (Alfredo Rodríguez Salicio), Cuban pianist
- Alfredo Rodríguez Rozas (born 1884), Chilean newspaperman and politician
- Alfredo E. Rodríguez, Argentine cardiologist, clinical researcher, and author

== See also ==
- Alfredo Rodrigues Gaspar (1865–1938), Portuguese naval officer and prime minister in 1924
