= Matusevich =

Matusevich can refer to:

== People ==
- Dmitry Matusevich (born 1978), Belarusian politician
- Eduard Matusevich (1937 —), Soviet speed skater
- Helen Matusevich Oujesky (1930 – 2010), American professor of microbiology
- Konstantin Matusevich (1971 —), Israeli high jumper
- Laura Matusevich, Argentine mathematician
- Nikolai Alexandrovich Matusevich (1852 — 1912), Russian vice admiral
- Nikolai Nikolayevich Matusevich (1879 — 1950), Soviet Arctic researcher
- Yan Matusevich (1946 — 1998), Belarusian Catholic priest

== Places ==
- Matusevich Fjord, Severnaya Zemlya, Russia
- Matusevich Glacier, Antarctica
