= National University of Córdoba =

Public university in Argentina

Coordinates: 31°26′15″S 64°11′16″W

- Universidad Nacional de Córdoba
- Institutional coat of arms
- Former name: Colegio Máximo
- Motto: Ut portet nomen meum coram gentibus (Latin)
- Motto in English: Proclaim my name before the people
- Type: Public
- Established: 1613; 413 years ago
- Endowment: US$175,552,772
- Rector: Jhon Boretto
- Academic staff: 8,203
- Students: 111,329 (2014)
- Undergraduates: 104,655 (2014)
- Postgraduates: 7,673
- Location: Córdoba, Córdoba Province, Argentina
- Campus: Urban; 1,115 hectares (2,760 acres)
- Website: unc.edu.ar
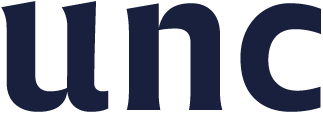

The National University of Córdoba (Spanish: Universidad Nacional de Córdoba) is a public university located in the city of Córdoba, Argentina. Founded in 1613, the university is the oldest in Argentina, the third oldest university of the Americas, with the first university being the National University of San Marcos (Peru, 1551) and the second one, Saint Thomas Aquinas University (Colombia, 1580).

Since the early 20th century it has been the second largest university in the country (after the University of Buenos Aires) in terms of the number of students, faculty, and academic programs. As the location of the first university founded in the land that is now Argentina, Córdoba has earned the nickname La Docta (roughly translated, "The Wise"). The National University of Córdoba is financially supported by Argentinian taxpayers, but - like all Argentine national universities - it is autonomous. This means it has the autonomy to manage its own budgets, elect its own administration, and dictate its own regulations. Similar to that of most public universities in Argentina, admission to undergraduate study at the University of Córdoba is not selective. The only requirement is that applicants pass a leveling course test with a score higher than 4, which is equivalent to getting 60% of correct answers.

== History ==
=== The Jesuit Era ===
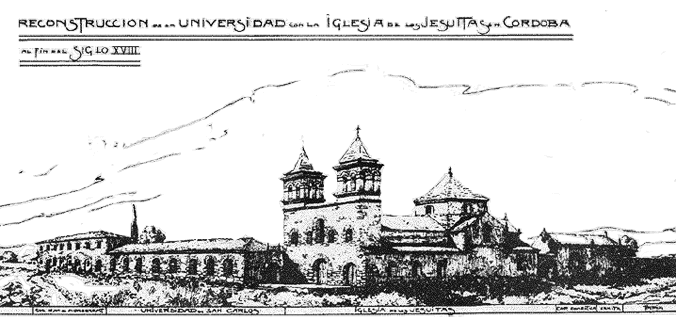
Reconstruction of the university with the church of the Jesuits at the end of the 18th century

In 1610 the Society of Jesus founded the Collegium Maximum in Córdoba, which was attended by students of the order. An institution of the highest intellectual caliber for the time, this was the precursor of the university. While still under the control of the Jesuits, and during the administration of the Bishop of Tucumán, Juan Fernando de Trejo y Sanabria, advanced studies began to be offered at what was now known as the Colegio Maximo de Córdoba. The school did not yet have authority to confer degrees. This milestone would be soon reached; on August 8, 1621 Pope Gregory XV granted this authority by an official document, which arrived in the city in April 1622. With this authorization, and with the approval of the church hierarchy and the provincial head of the Jesuits, Pedro de Oñate, the university began its official existence. This also marks the beginning of the history of higher education in Argentina.

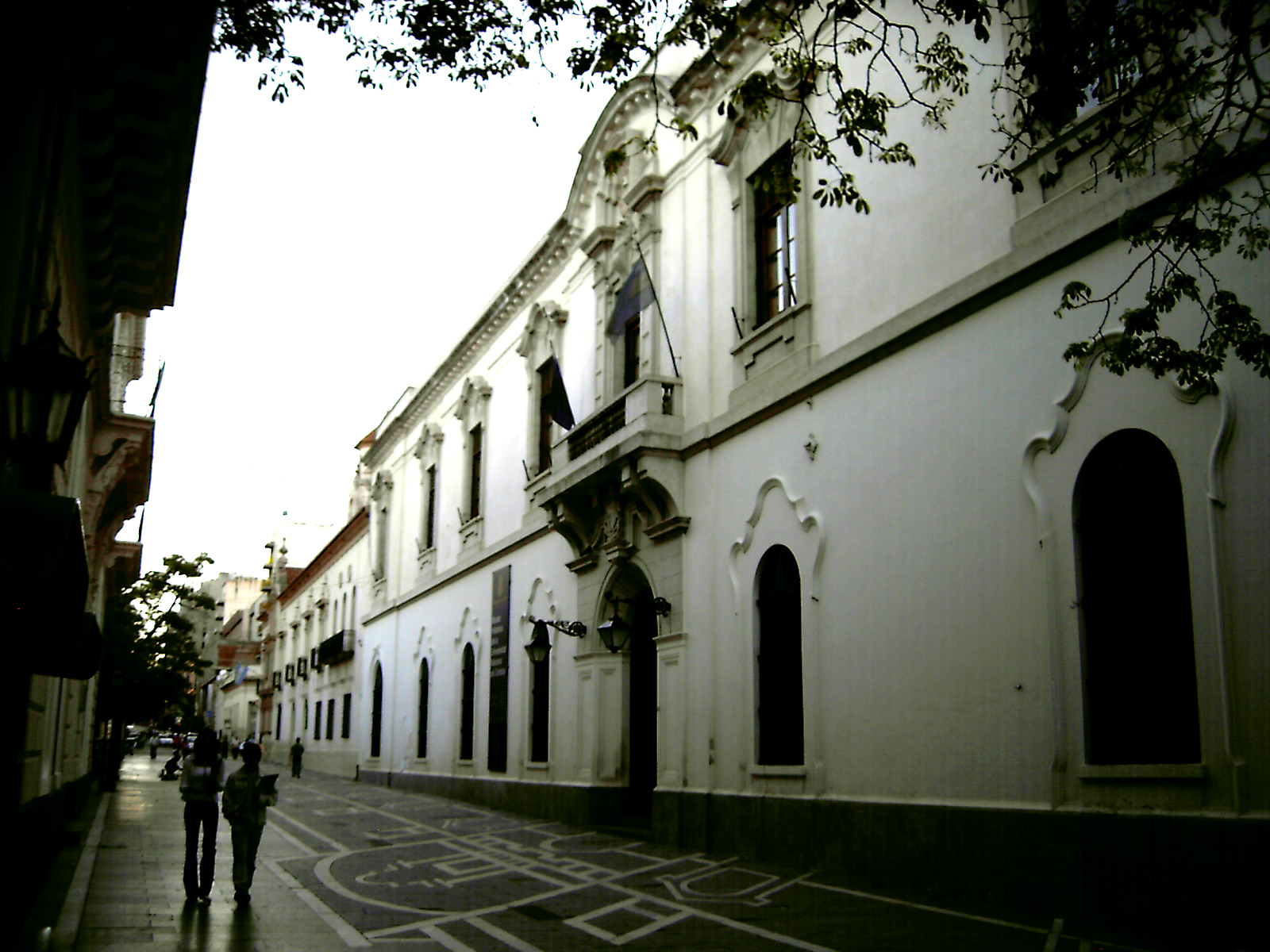
The original administration building

The Jesuits remained in control of the university until 1767, when they were expelled by order of King Carlos III. Leadership then passed to the Franciscan order. For the first 150 years after its founding, the university maintained an exclusive focus on philosophy and theology. The first secondary school in Cordoba was Our Lady of Monserrat, founded by a Jesuit priest, Father Ignacio Duarte y Quirós, in 1687 and incorporated into the university's aegis in 1907. The College of Monserrat, as well as the original physical plant of the university and the Jesuit church, are part of the Jesuit Block, and were declared a World Heritage Site by UNESCO in 2000.

At the end of the 18th century, law studies were added (with the creation of the School of Law and Social Sciences), and from this time forward studies at the university were no longer exclusively theological. Following a conflict between the Franciscans and the secular clergy over the direction of the university, the house of study was renamed (by royal decree) to Royal University of Saint Charles and Our Lady of Monserrat. With this new name the university acquired the double title of Royal and Pontifical, and Monsignor Gregorio Funes was appointed president. With these changes, the Franciscans were replaced by the secular clergy as leaders of the university.

=== Post-Jesuit Era ===
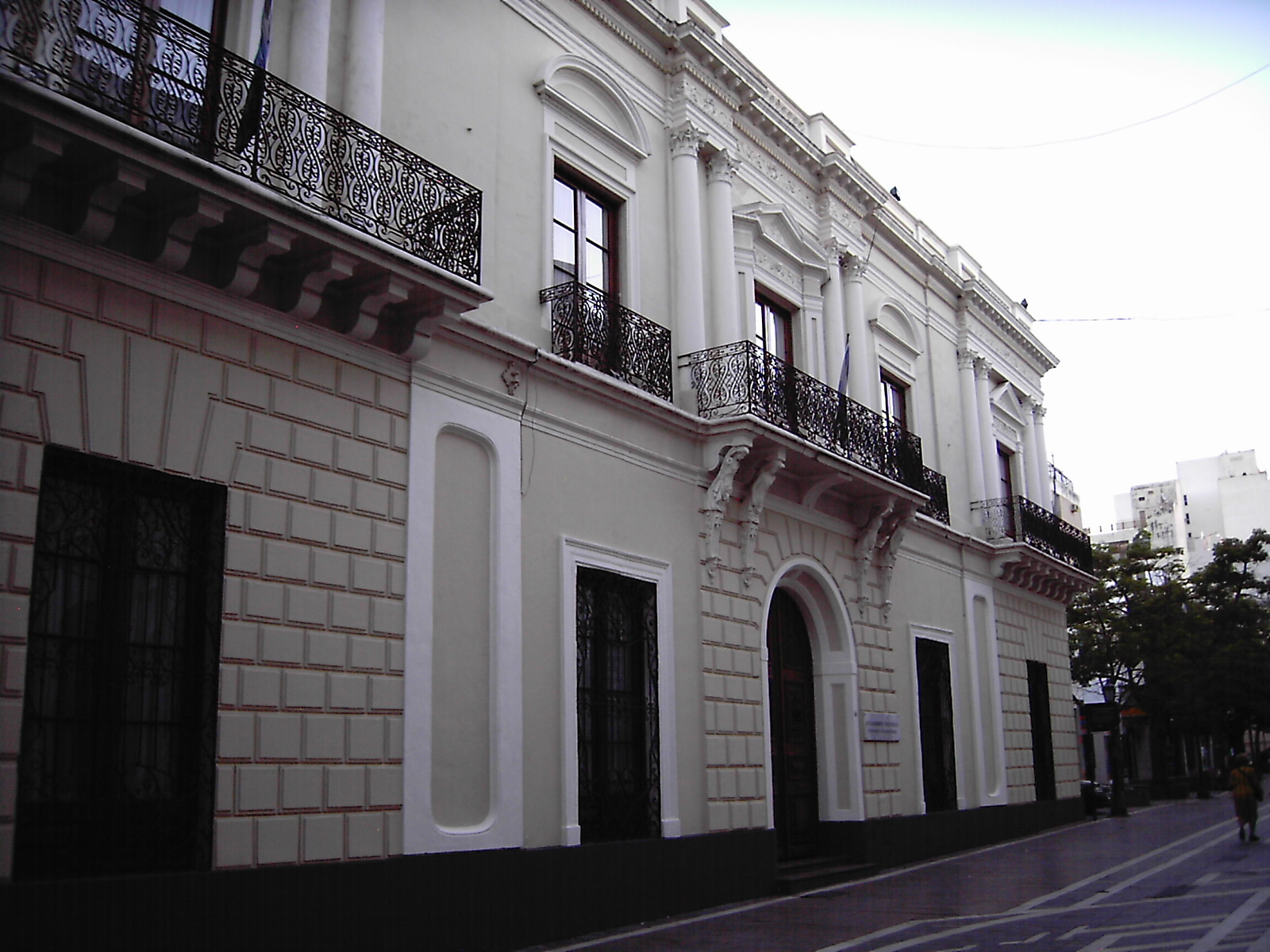
Law School

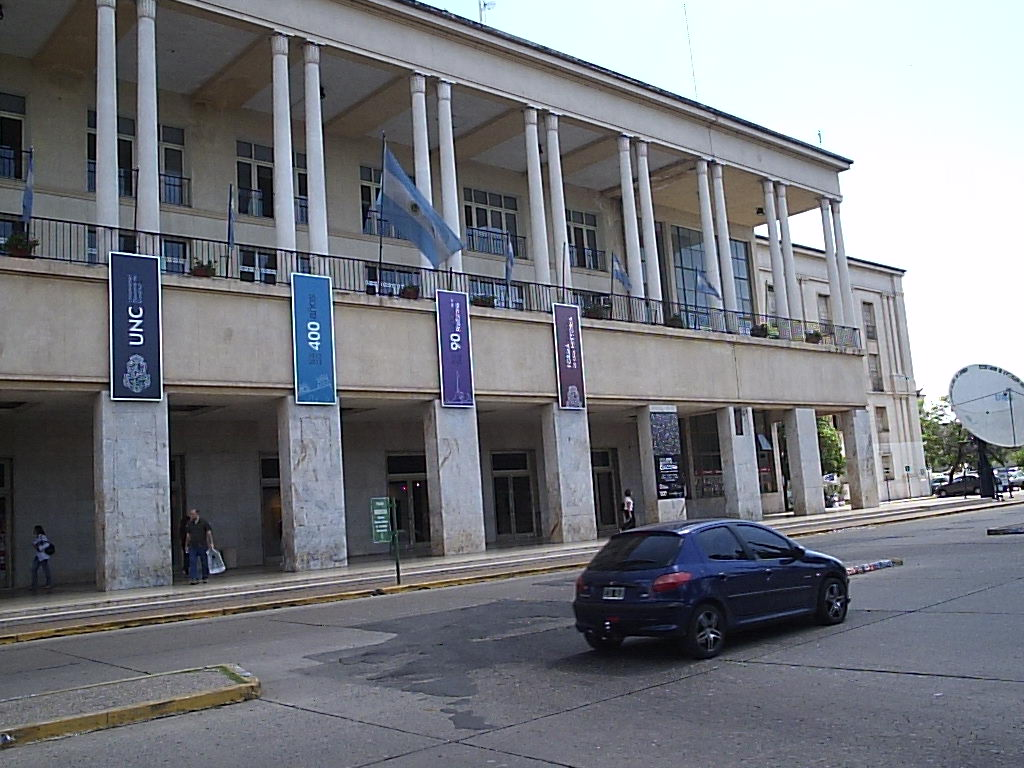
The Argentina Pavilion

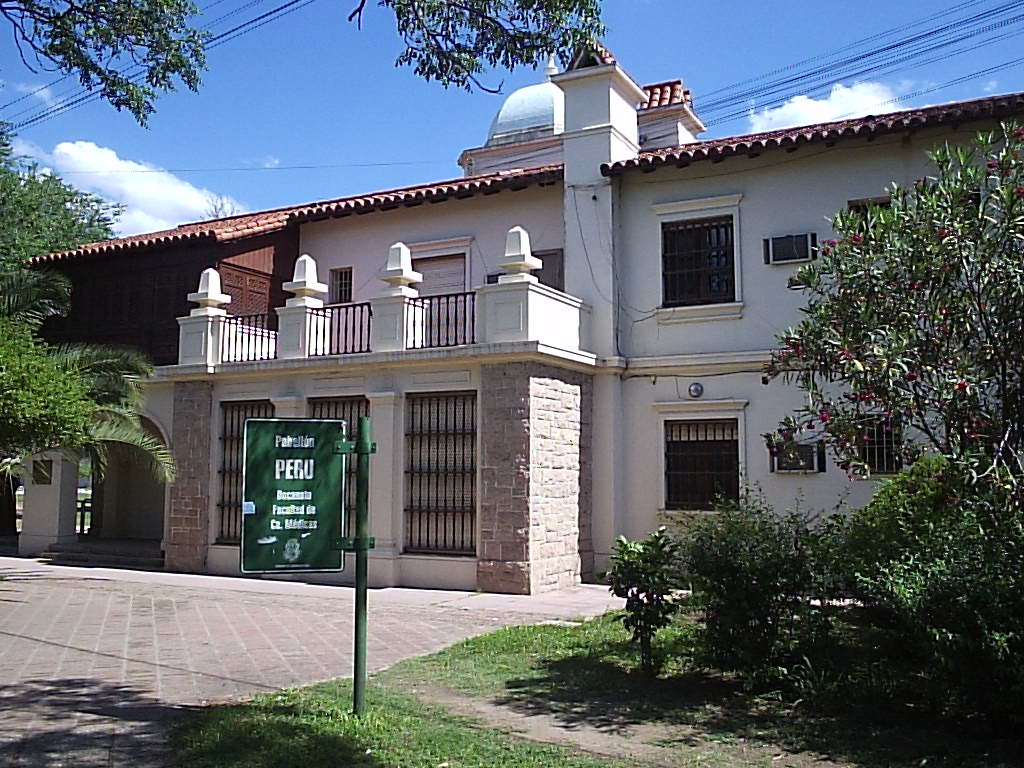
The Peru Pavilion

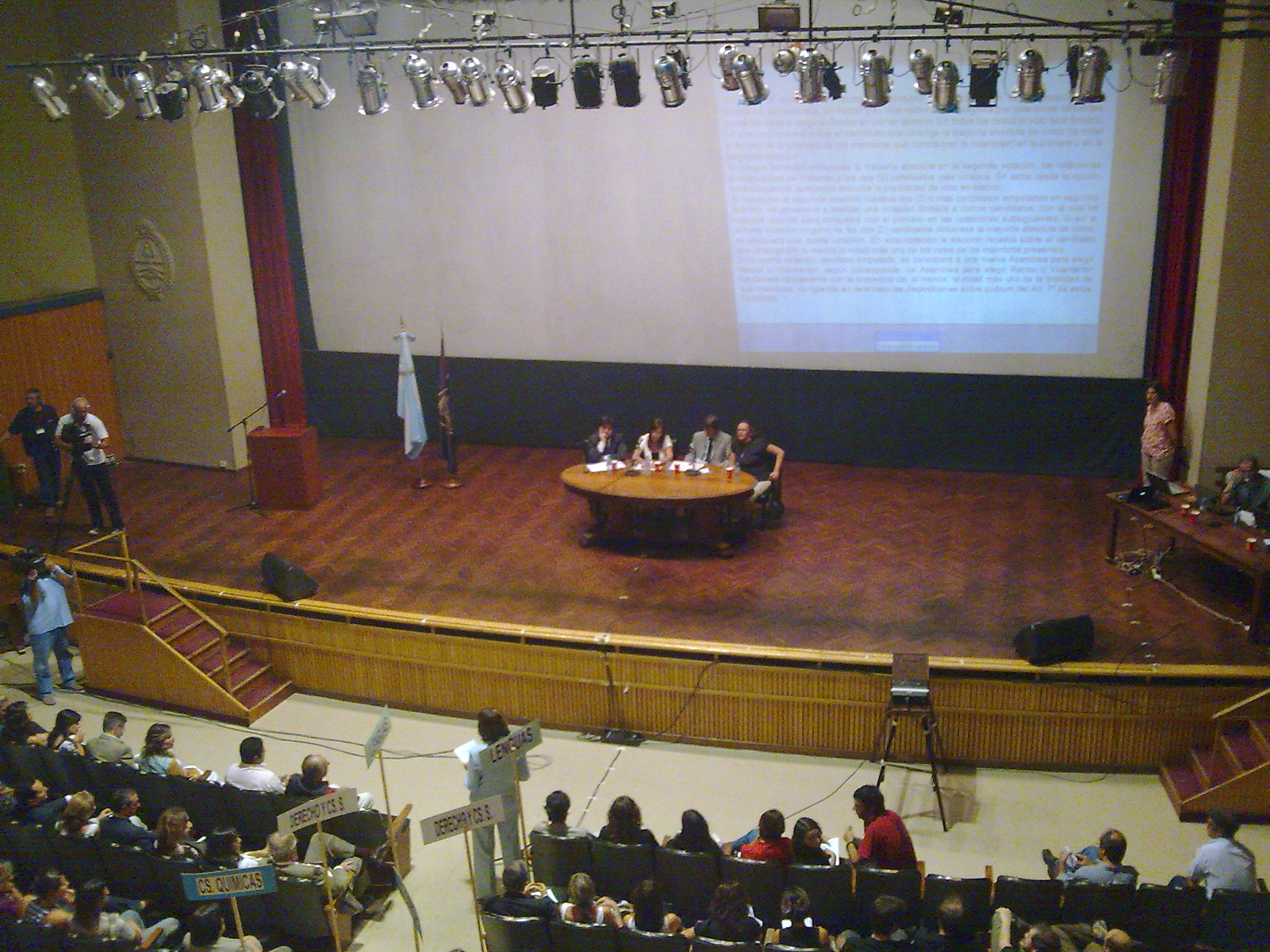
Students and faculty assemble in the main auditorium for the election of university authorities

Monsignor Funes was the architect of profound reforms in studies and introduced new subjects. On May 25, 1810, the May Revolution began, and the new regime took control of the University of Córdoba, although Monsignor Funes remained in his post. In 1820 the university was relocated in other parts of the province of Córdoba, due to a situation of disorganization and chaos across the nation. Around the middle of the 19th century, a new national constitution was ratified, which outlined the new framework for the political organization of Argentina. At this time there were two provincial universities in the country: one in Córdoba and one in Buenos Aires (founded in 1821). The former was nationalized in 1856, the latter in 1881, leaving both under control of the national government.

Between 1860 and 1880, many academic reforms were instituted, similar to those occurring at other universities around the world. In 1864 theological studies were finally eliminated. During the presidency of Faustino Sarmiento the sciences gained momentum through the recruitment of foreign lecturers specializing in Mathematical-Physical Science, leading to the opening of the School of Exact, Physical, and Natural Sciences. This period also saw the birth of the Academy of Exact Sciences and the Astronomical Observatory. In 1877 the School of Medicine was opened. In 1885 the Law of Avellaneda, the first law pertaining to universities, was passed, laying out the ways in which the bylaws of the national universities could be amended, and their administrative framework, leaving other matters under the control of the universities themselves. In 1886 the bylaws of the university in Córdoba were modified to conform to the new law.

=== The Reform of 1918 ===
In 1918, the UNC was the scene of a historic milestone known as the University Reform. Students, inspired by the ideas of autonomy, co-governance and democratization of education, led a movement that spread throughout Latin America. This academic revolution had a lasting impact on higher education and laid the groundwork for a more inclusive and participatory approach to university decision-making.

== Faculties ==
- Faculty of Law – Established in 1791, the Faculty of Law was the first faculty of the National University of Córdoba. Since its foundation, it has been regarded as a central institution in the academic and political life of Argentina, shaping generations of jurists, legislators and public officials.
- Faculty of Agriculture
- Faculty of Architecture, Planning and Design
- Faculty of Arts
- Faculty of Chemical Sciences
- Faculty of Communication Sciences
- Faculty of Dentistry
- Faculty of Economics
- Faculty of Exact, Physical and Natural Sciences
- School of Languages
- Faculty of Mathematics, Astronomy, Physics and Computing
- Faculty of Medicine
- Faculty of Philosophy and Humanities
- Faculty of Psychology
- Faculty of Social Sciences

== School of Languages ==
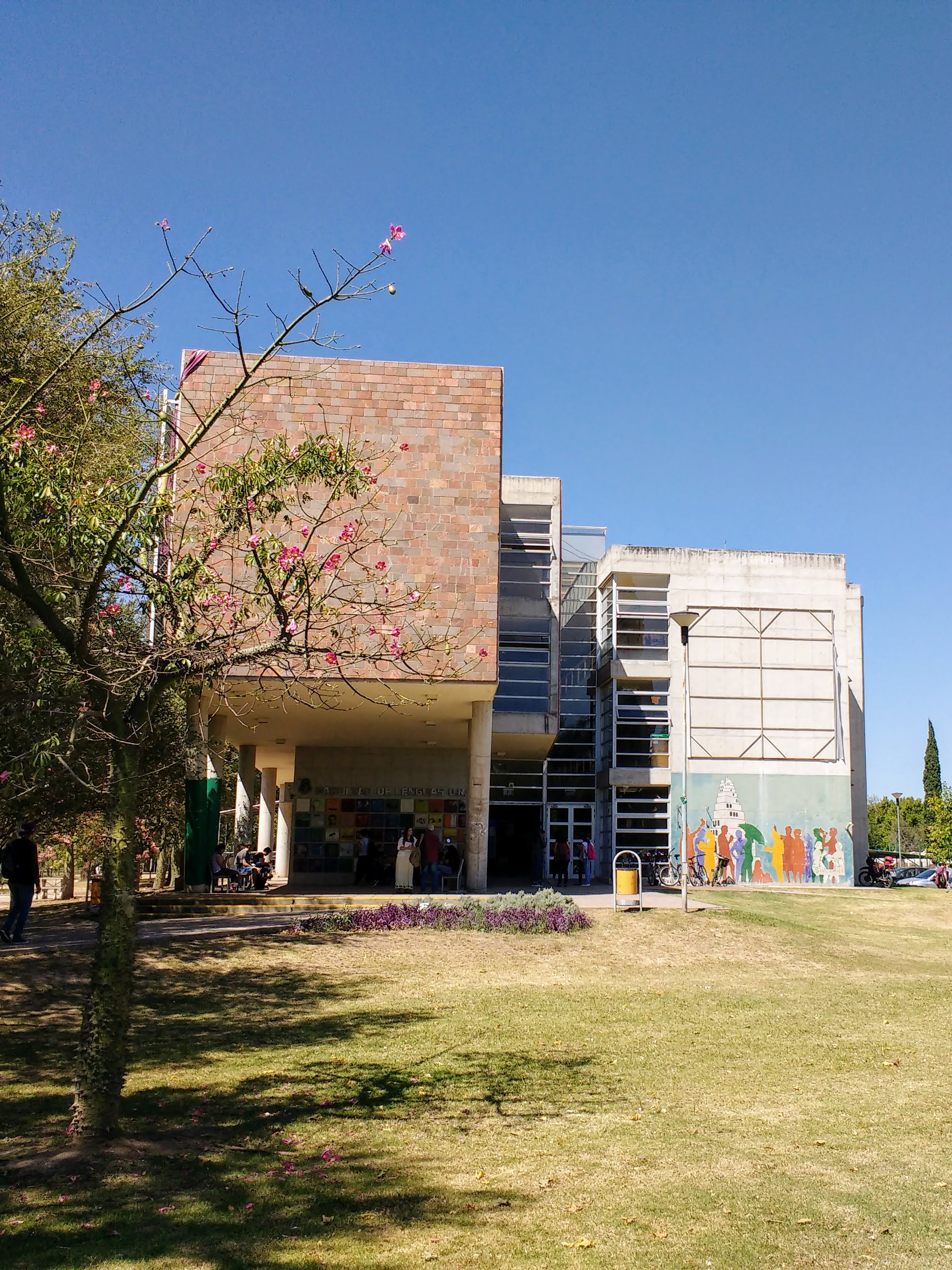
School of Languages, National University of Córdoba, Argentina

The School of Languages is one of the faculties of the National University of Córdoba, located in the University Campus, in the southern area of Córdoba, Argentina.

Its origin dates back to 1920 when the Department of Languages was created, under the Faculty of Law and Social Sciences. The first languages studied were French, Italian and basic notions of legal Latin. In 1926, it changed its name to Language Institute, which depended on the Rector's Office of the university, and the academic offer was expanded with professorships and translation programs in German, French, English and Italian.

In 1943, it changed its name first to School of Higher Education on Languages and then to School of Higher Education on Classic and Modern Languages, at the same time that the academic offerings were expanded, and the curricula were modified. Since the early 1980s, there were plans to establish it as a faculty, a project that became a reality in 2000. Its current dean is Graciela Ferrero.

This school has undergraduate degrees in six languages (German, Spanish, French, English, Italian and Portuguese) and graduate degrees such as conferences, master's degrees, and PhDs.

== Affiliated institutions of secondary education ==
- National College of Monserrat
- Manuel Belgrano School of Business

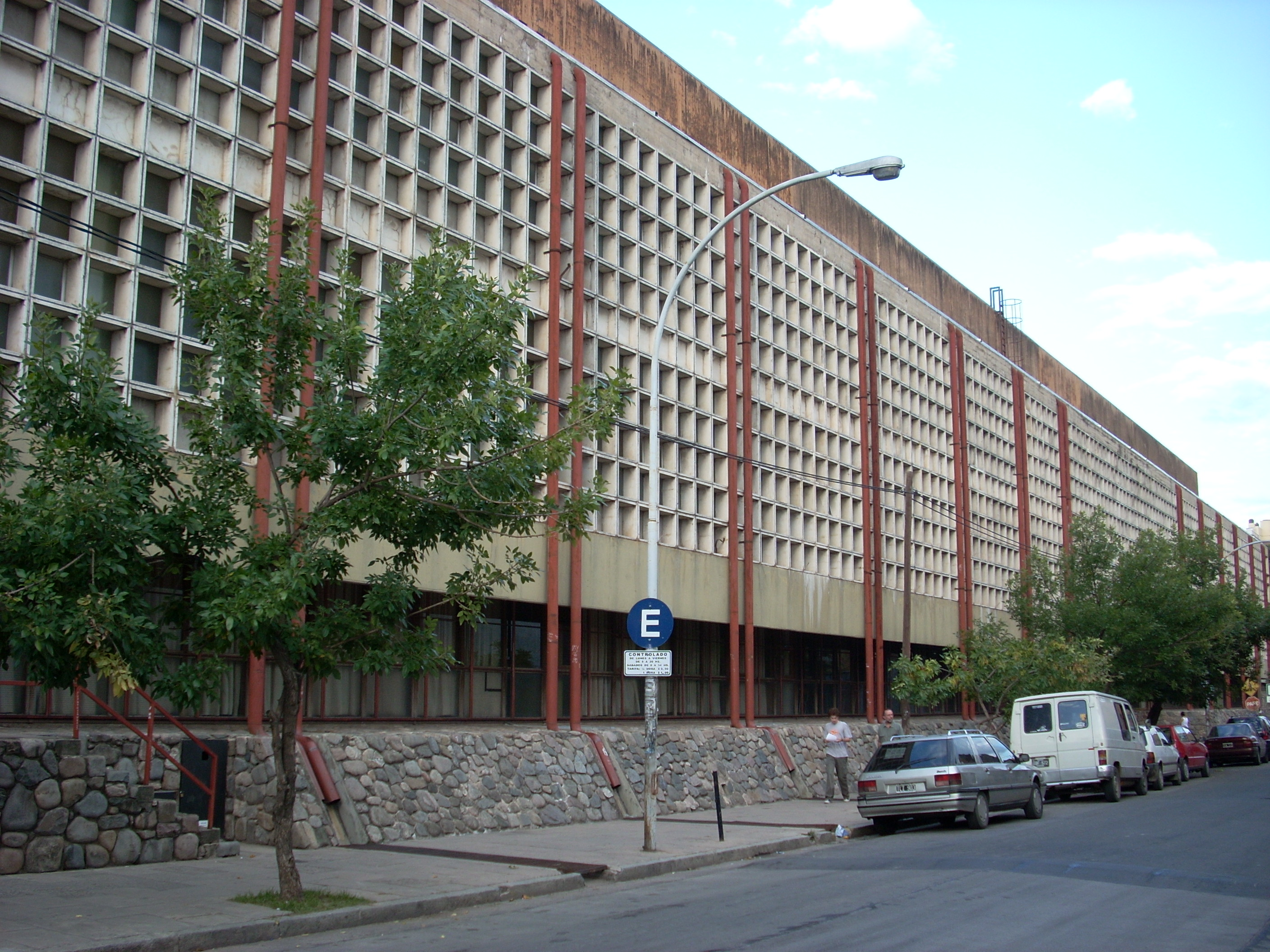
Manuel Belgrano School located in Alberdi Neighborhood in Córdoba, Argentina.

== Other affiliated institutions ==
- Astronomical Observatory of Córdoba (OAC)
- National Clinical Hospital
- National Maternity
- Dental Clinic
- Blood Laboratory
- Museum of Paleontology and Anthropology
- Academy of Sciences
- Center for Advanced Studies
- Instituto de Astronomía Teórica y Experimental (IATE)
- Botanical Museum of Córdoba

== Departments and services ==
- Steps: Healthcare system for university students
- Athletic Department: Offers students opportunities to participate in sports and other physical activities, primarily on campus
- University Dining Services: Operates during the academic year and offers meals from Monday through Friday, with three daily menus overseen by a nutrition specialist
- Career Assistance: Specialized staffpeople provide counseling to students and prospective students on planning for a professional career, and on academic matters
- Grants: Grant programs funded by the national government and by contributions from students of the university
- Main Library: Includes more than 150,000 manuscripts and periodicals from the 19th century

== Campus ==
The main campus is located in the center of the city, made up of 23 buildings for classes and cultural activities. In 1952, a more spacious campus, the "University City" (Spanish: Ciudad Universitaria) was established in the southern part of Córdoba city. The university also owns other campuses, notably, an experimental agricultural station located 20 km southeast of Córdoba city, and an astronomic observatory, among others.

== Rankings ==
University rankings

Global – Overall
- THE World: 801-1000

In 2017, Times Higher Education ranked the university within the 801-1000 band globally.

== Notable alumni ==
- Presidents of Argentina, Carlos Menem, Fernando de la Rua and Héctor Cámpora
- Governors of Córdoba, Eduardo Angeloz, José Manuel de la Sota and Juan Schiaretti, among others
- Camila Sosa Villada, novelist (writer of Las malas)
- Noemí Goytia (graduated 1963), architect, professor
- Laura Matusevich, mathematician
- Martin Uribe, Columbia University economist
- Sandra Díaz, ecologist
- Gabriela González, physicist
- Alfredo E. Rodríguez, interventional cardiologist
- Susana Cabuchi, writer and poet

== See also ==
- Jesuit Block and Estancias of Córdoba
- Channel 10 - Córdoba
- Argentine Universities
- University Revolution
- List of colonial universities in Latin America
- List of Jesuit sites
