= Laura Matusevich =

Argentine mathematician

Laura Felicia Matusevich is an Argentine mathematician.

== Birth and Education ==
Matusevich was born in Córdoba, Argentina, and earned her undergraduate degree from the Universidad Nacional de Córdoba. She earned her PhD from the University of California, Berkeley in 2002.

== Career ==
From 2003 until 2004 Matusevich was a Benjamin Peirce Assistant Professor at Harvard University. From 2004 until 2006 she was a tenure-track assistant professor at the University of Pennsylvania. In 2005, she began as a tenure-track assistant professor at Texas A&M University, where she became a tenure-track associate professor in 2009. She became a full professor there in 2017.

== Publications ==
Matusevich has published 34 research articles as of the 16th of March 2022.

== Recognition ==
Matusevich is the recipient of multiple awards and honors, having been an Alfred P. Sloan Research Fellow, a NSF Postdoctoral Fellow, and an Antorchas Fellow (one of 25 people awarded this nationwide in Argentina), among others.
