= Argentine National Observatory =

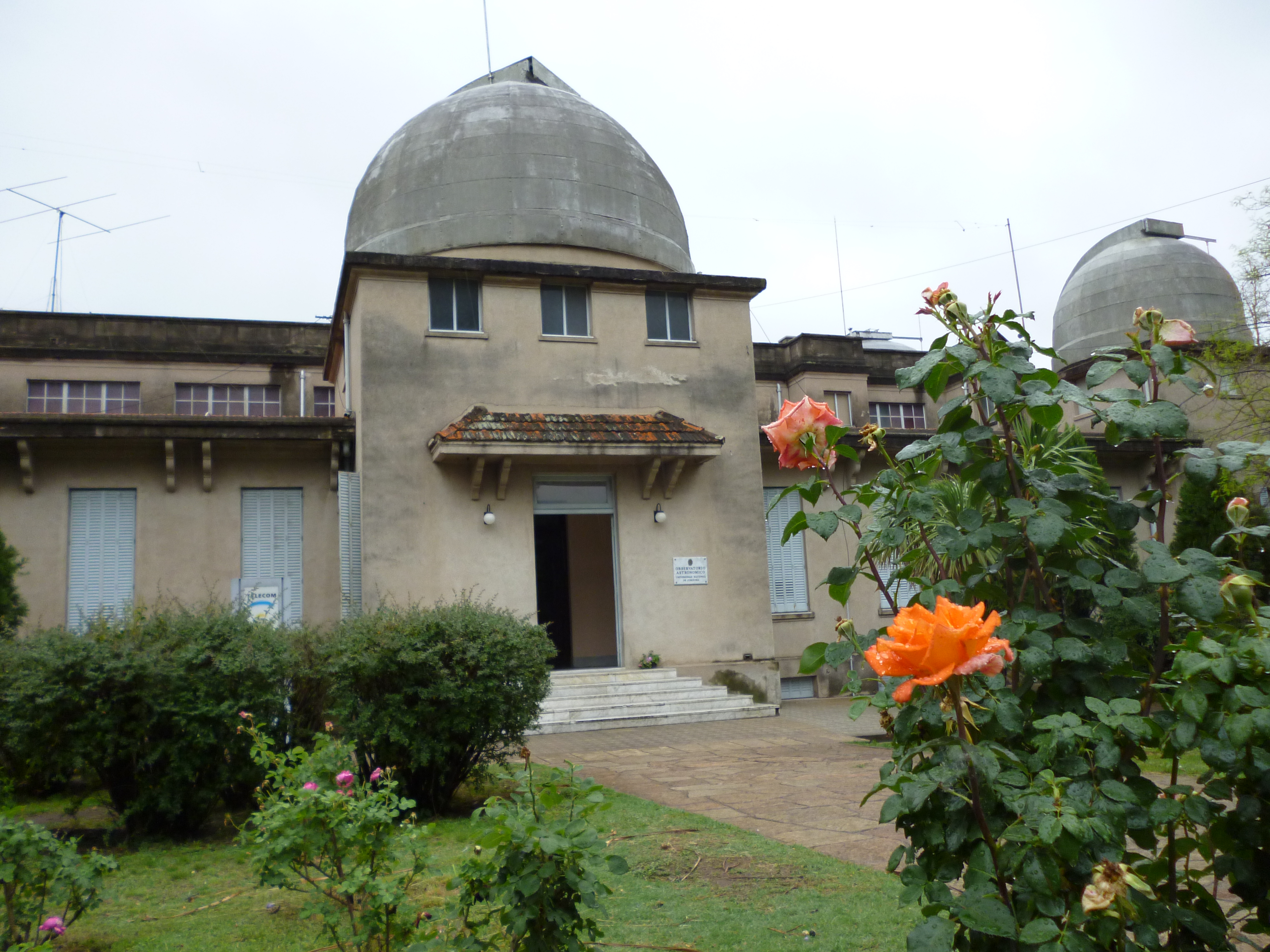
- Alternative names: Astronomical Observatory of Cordoba
- Organization: National University of Córdoba
- Observatory code: 822
- Location: Córdoba Province, Argentina
- Coordinates: 31°25′17″S 64°11′56″W
- Established: 1871
- Website: www.oac.unc.edu.ar
- Telescopes: Bosque Alegre ground station
- Location of Argentine National Observatory
- Related media on Commons

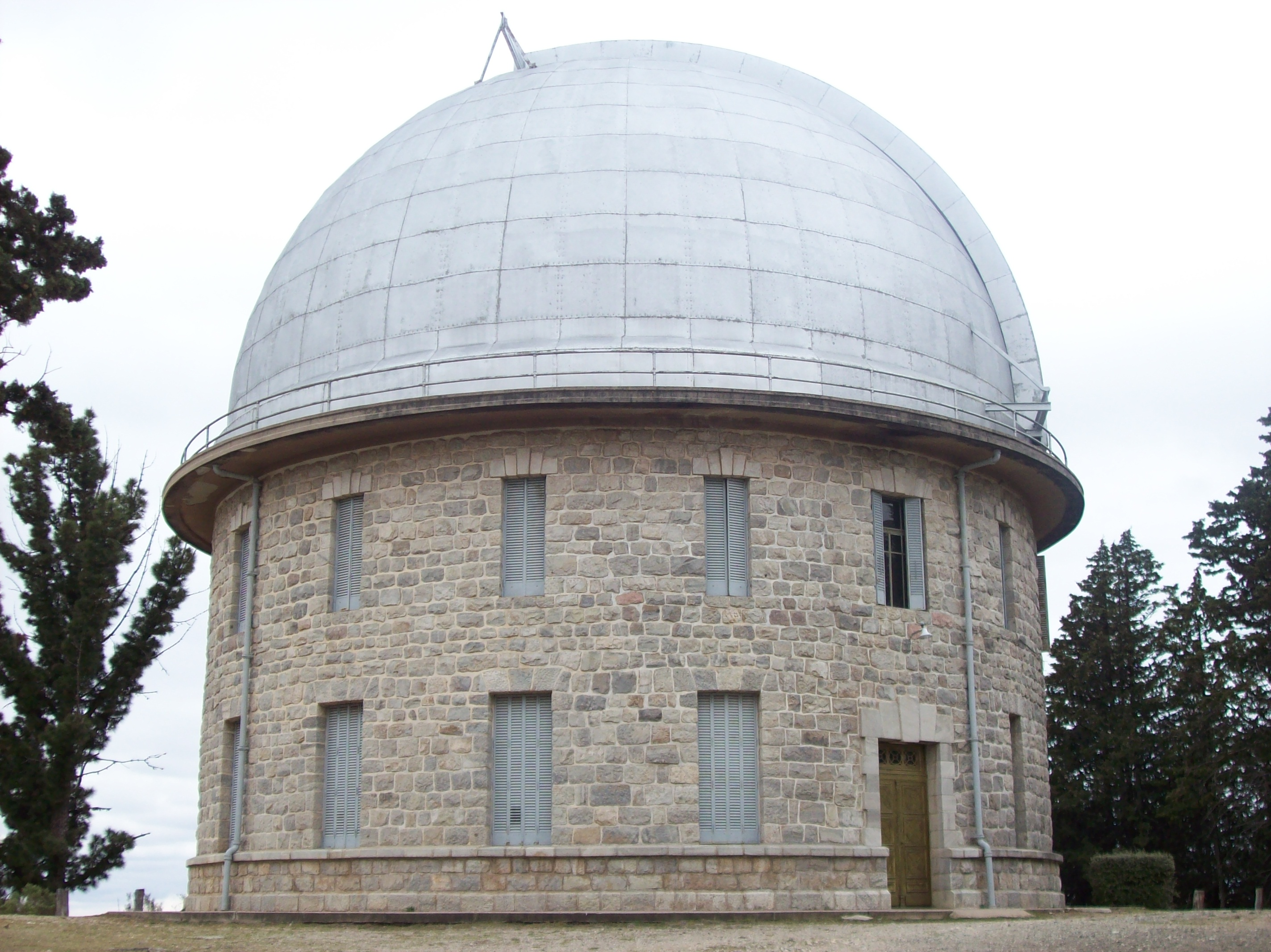
Observatorio Astronómico of Córdoba

The Argentine National Observatory, today the Astronomical Observatory of Córdoba, was founded on 24 October 1871, by Argentine president Domingo F. Sarmiento and the North American astronomer Benjamin Apthorp Gould.

== History ==
Its creation was the beginning of astronomical studies in Argentina. When President Domingo F. Sarmiento was representing his country in the United States, he had the opportunity to meet pioneering astronomer Benjamin Apthorp Gould, who was very interested in traveling to Argentina in order to study the stellar south hemisphere.

Once Sarmiento was installed as President of Argentina, he invited Gould to travel to Argentina, in 1869, to provide his full support to organize an observatory. Gould arrived in Buenos Aires in 1870. The same night of the inauguration of the Astronomical Observatory of Córdoba, Gould began with the naked eye, and later with the aid of small binoculars, a map of the southern sky, recording more than 7000 stars, which was published under the name of Uranometría Argentina. This work by Gould, Miles Rock and others formalized the southern constellations which were not as well documented as the northern ones. He remained as director of the observatory until 1885, when he returned to the United States.

The first stellar photographs in the world – hundreds of sheets of open star clusters – were taken at this observatory. This helped to determine the exact position of each star. Gould published the results in the Catálogo de zonas estelares (1884), the first systematic and large-scale astronomy book, including more than 70,000 stars of the southern hemisphere, and the Argentinian General Catalog, which contains about 35,000 stars. The Catálogo de zonas estelares was republished in 1897 under the title Fotografías Cordobesas.

As part of the Córdoba Astronomical Observatory, the Meteorological Office was created by Sarmiento at Gould's suggestion in 1872, and is now known as the National Meteorological Service. The national network of meteorological stations and geomagnetic observatories was established in 1873.

== Bosque Alegre Astrophysical Station ==
The Bosque Alegre Astrophysics Station is located about 30 miles southwest of Cordoba at an altitude of 1200 meters (3,937-ft) in the Sierras Chicas. The observatory was integral to the development of Argentine and Latin American Astrophysics. For example, the Atlas of Austral Galaxies by J. L. Sersic.

The 61-inch (1.54-meter) Great Reflector was the concept of the director of the Argentine National Observatory, Charles Dillon Perrine, who assumed the directorship in 1909. He had experience with the 36-in Crossley Reflector at Lick Observatory from 1900 to 1909. In 1912 the National Government approved Perrine's proposal to construct this telescope, equal to the largest in the world at that time. It would remain the largest in South America until 1981 when a larger one was built in Brazil.

The mount and dome were contracted to Warner and Swasey of Cleveland, Ohio, USA. The glass block for the mirror was ordered from Saint-Gobain of France, completed in Dec. 1912, and delivered to Argentina in early 1913.

Due to the high price asked by George W. Ritchey (USA) to figure (shape and polish) the glass into a mirror, Perrine decided to have the highly skilled staff technician, James Mulvey, do the work at the observatory itself in a purpose-built optics laboratory. This experience put Argentina at the forefront in this field.

The death in 1915 of Mr. Mulvey, the First World War, the rebuilding of the Observatory in the city of Córdoba, political challenges, and national economic limitations significantly delayed the project.

In 1936, Perrine retired, having selected the site, constructed the station buildings, and assembled the telescope mount, but the mirror was not yet complete. F. Aguilar and JJ Nissen, director of the National Observatory, assumed responsibility and the mirror was sent for completion to the Fecker optician in the US. At that time, the telescope was the third largest in the world. The first Argentine astrophysicist Enrique Gaviola went to the US in 1939 to receive the mirror. Sadly, Fecker, even with its well-known expertise, could not complete the mirror. Gaviola took control of the configuration (shaping and polishing) and completed it.

Finally, on July 5, 1942, after 33 years of work, the Astrophysical Station was inaugurated. “This Astrophysical Station was born in the optimistic and courageous mind of Charles Dillon Perrine, director of the Cordoba Observatory from 1909 to 1936. Perrine dedicated the best energies of many years of his life to the realization in the matter of his daring dream. He had triumphs and defeats, successes and failures. " Words by Enrique Gaviola, inauguration speech of the Bosque Alegre Astrophysical Station, July 5, 1942.

A 20-in (76-cm) telescope was obtained by Director Perrine and figured by Mulvey as practice before figuring the larger 61-inch (1.54-meter) mirror. It was the “first large reflecting telescope, designed, built entirely in Argentina (1913-18), and used with success”. Later it was named the "Perrine" after C. D. Perrine, the Director from 1909 to 1936. It was first used at the Cordoba Observatory, then because of urban light pollution in the mid-1970's, it was moved to the High Altitude Station of the Félix Aguilar Astronomical Observatory in the province of San Juan. On November 18, 2011, the "Perrine" was re-located and installed in its own dome at Bosque Alegre. At this time the "Perrine" is the second largest telescope at Bosque Alegre and the fourth largest in Argentina. It was put to work immediately and continues to be used to do the necessary validation of discoveries of celestial bodies located in different parts of the sky.

== See also ==
- List of astronomical observatories
- List of astronomical societies
