= Alfredo Rodríguez y Pacheco =

Mexican politician

- Born: 11 August 1959 (age 66); Peto, Yucatán, Mexico
- Occupations: Deputy and Senator
- Political party: PAN

Alfredo Rodríguez y Pacheco (born 11 August 1959) is a Mexican politician affiliated with the PAN. As of 2013 he served as Senator of the LX and LXI Legislatures of the Mexican Congress representing Yucatán. He also served as Deputy during the LIX Legislature.
