= Alfredo E. Rodríguez =

Argentine cardiologist, researcher, author

- Citizenship: Argentine
- Education: BS in medical surgery Ph.D. in Coronary Angioplasty and Intracoronary Thrombolysis; MD in Hemodynamics and Angiography
- Occupations: Interventional cardiologist, clinical researcher, and author
- Medical career
- Institutions: Cardiovascular Research Center (CECI); Otamendi Hospital

Alfredo E. Rodríguez is an Argentine interventional cardiologist, clinical researcher, and author. He is the Chief of Interventional Cardiology Service at Otamendi Hospital and Director and Founder of the Cardiovascular Research Center (CECI) a non -profit Research Organization in Buenos Aires Argentina.

Rodríguez has conducted research in the field of cardiology with a particular focus on coronary angioplasty bypass surgeries, myocardial infarction, diabetes, and hemodynamics. He is the author of several books, including Coronary Transluminal Angioplasty and Controversies in Cardiology and has been the recipient of the Rafael Bullrich Award and the Geronimo H. Alvarez Prize.

Rodriguze is an academic editor of Academia Medicine Journal and the editor in chief of Argentina Journal of Cardiovascular Interventions.

== Education ==
Rodríguez received his medical degree from Córdoba National University, School of Medicine in 1974, and completed his residency in the Cardiology Department at Hospital Privado Sanatorio Güemes under the direction of Luis M. De la Fuente. He then completed his PhD in Coronary Angioplasty and Intracoronary Thrombolysis from Córdoba Catholic University. Following his PhD, he focused on Hemodynamics and Angiography and received an MD from the Argentine Collegium of Hemodynamics.

== Career ==
In 1981, Rodriguez had training in coronary angioplasty for a short period of three months at the San Francisco Heart Institute led by Richard K Myler. Rodríguez is the former assistant director of professor Luis M. De la Fuente and sub-chief of interventional cardiology service at Hospital Privado Sanatorio Güemes and Interventional Cardiology Service at Sanatorio Anchorena. He also held an appointment as the director of Post Graduate Medical School at the Buenos Aires University School of Medicine at the Sanatorio Otamendi Unit. Additionally, he founded and currently serves as the director of the Cardiovascular Research Center (CECI) in Buenos Aires, a non-profit clinical research organization and is the chief of the Interventional Cardiology Service at Otamnedi Hospital in Buenos Aires and in Sanatorio Las Lomas in San Isidro.

== Research ==
Rodríguez is known for his clinical research in the area of cardiology, with an interest in interventional cardiology including coronary restenosis as well as myocardial infarction and diabetes. He has published several manuscripts.

=== Interventional cardiology ===
Throughout his research career, Rodríguez has worked on comprehending the efficacy of percutaneous coronary interventions in patients with multivessel disease by comparing it with the coronary artery bypass technique. Additionally, he reported that transluminal coronary angioplasty treatment had no significant in-hospital complications but a lower efficacy rate when compared to coronary artery bypass in patients with multiple vessel disease, called ERACI I and II trials He conducted multiple randomized clinical trials between 1993 and 2005, including those in 1993, 1995, 1997, 2001, and 2005, to elucidate the aftereffects of interventional treatments among cardiac patients. He was the first to describe the role of acute wall recoil in the pathophysiology of coronary balloon angioplasty and the prevention of this phenomenon with bare metal stent implantation.

During his work on myocardial infarction, Rodríguez evaluated the efficacy of several angioplasty approaches, including tirofiban and abciximab infusion, as well as the implantation of both Sirolimus-Eluting and uncoated stents. In 1998, he published the first randomized trial comparing balloon angioplasty with stents in acute myocardial infarction, known as the GRAMI trial, in the American Journal of Cardiology. He suggested the use of rheolytic thrombectomy prior to stenting of the infarct artery in patients suffering from acute myocardial infarction and exhibiting evidence of coronary thrombus. Additionally, he presented the consideration of Abciximab plus IRA as the routine reperfusion strategy in patients with percutaneous mechanical revascularization. During the early 2000s, he examined the problem of DES (drug-eluting stents) late stent thrombosis, and reported on a trial related to this issue in 2006 in the Journal of the American College of Cardiology, as well as in European Heart Journal and Euro Intervention in 2007. In 2006, he also conducted a randomized trial that demonstrated the benefits of using oral immunosuppressive drugs to prevent restenosis following bare metal stent implantation. Later in 2023, he conducted research on the issue of non-cardiac death and cancer, and proposed the limited use of drug-eluting stent transplantation according to patient's age, lesion complexity, and life expectancy.

In his book, Controversies in Cardiology, Rodríguez has discussed topics that are characterized by ambiguity, ongoing discussions, or a lack of agreement according to existing guidelines. He has highlighted three main areas i.e., cardiovascular risks, its diagnosis, and management. Jorge Lerman commended this book for its ability to explore controversial topics that have not been widely discussed and provide a comprehensive analysis of each subject. He further added that "This innovative format constitutes an attractive incentive for the reader who is interested in learning about the advances in cardiovascular science."

=== Diabetes and cardiac care ===
In addition to his work comparing angioplasty approaches and coronary artery bypass, as an interventional cardiologist, Rodríguez has also studied the impact of diabetes on the mortality and efficacy of heart surgeries among diabetic patients. He proposed that using a coronary PC coated stent during the percutaneous intervention in diabetic patients with small coronary arteries has the ability to provide improved angiographic outcomes. Additionally, he noted that the use of paclitaxel-eluting balloons followed by bare-metal stents in treating diabetic patients showed a notably favorable result compared to treating them with a single bare-metal stent. His research further elucidated that a coronary artery bypass graft is a better option than percutaneous coronary intervention as it decreases the risk of mortality and other major cardiovascular issues in nondiabetic patients.

== Awards and honors ==
- 1996, 2007 and 2015 – Best abstract, Latin America Society of Cardiology (SOLACI)
- 1981 – Rafael Bullrich Award, National Academy of Medicine
- 1993 – Award for Best Work on Cardiology, Argentine Foundation of Cardiology
- 1995 – Award for best work in Interventional Cardiology, Roberto Villavicencio Foundation
- 2001 – Geronimo H. Alvarez, National Academy of Medicine
- 2005 – Best Abstract, European Congress of Cardiology
- 2018 – Outstanding personality of the autonomous city of Buenos Aires in the field of Medical Sciences, Buenos Aires House of Representatives

== Bibliography ==
=== Selected books ===
- Therapeutics by catheterization in ischemic cardiopathy (Transluminal Angioplasty – Coronary Thrombolysis) with cardiologist Luis M. De la Fuente. Editorial Intermedica 1985.
- Coronary Transluminal Angioplasty
- Up-to-date tendencies in Cardiology
- Controversies in Cardiology

=== Selected articles ===
- Rodríguez, A., Bernardi, V., Navia, J., Baldi, J., Grinfeld, L., Martinez, J., ... & ERACI II Investigators. (2001). Argentine randomized study: coronary angioplasty with stenting versus coronary bypass surgery in patients with multiple-vessel disease (ERACI II): 30-day and one-year follow-up results. Journal of the American College of Cardiology, 37(1), 51–58.
- Antoniucci, D., Rodríguez, A., & Hempelet, A. (2004). A randomized trial comparing primary infarct artery stenting with or without abciximab in acute myocardial infarction. ACC Current Journal Review, 3(13), 50.
- Rodríguez, A. E., Mieres, J., Fernandez-Pereira, C., Vigo, C. F., Rodríguez-Alemparte, M., Berrocal, D., ... & Palacios, I. (2006). Coronary stent thrombosis in the current drug-eluting stent era: insights from the ERACI III trial. Journal of the American College of Cardiology, 47(1), 205–207.
- Rodríguez-Granillo, D. S., Raizner, A. E., Palacios, I., Vigo, W., Delgado, J., Fernandez-Pereira, C., ... & Alfredo, M. Oral Rapamycin After Coronary Bare-Metal Stent Implantation to Prevent.
- Rodríguez, A. E., Rodríguez-Granillo, G. A., & Palacios, I. F. (2007). Late stent thrombosis: the Damocles sword of drug eluting stents. Eurointervention, 2, 512–7.
- Rodríguez, A. E., Maree, A. O., Mieres, J., Berrocal, D., Grinfeld, L., Fernandez-Pereira, C., ... & Palacios, I. F. (2007). Late loss of early benefit from drug-eluting stents when compared with bare-metal stents and coronary artery bypass surgery: 3 years follow-up of the ERACI III registry. European heart journal, 28(17), 2118–2125.
- Hlatky, M. A., Boothroyd, D. B., Bravata, D. M., Boersma, E., Booth, J., Brooks, M. M., ... & Pocock, S. J. (2009). Coronary artery bypass surgery compared with percutaneous coronary interventions for multivessel disease: a collaborative analysis of individual patient data from ten randomised trials. The Lancet, 373(9670), 1190–1197.
- Rodríguez, A. E., Palacios, I., Rodríguez-Granillo, A. M., Mieres, J. R., Tarragona, S., Fernandez-Pereira, C., ... & Antoniucci, D. (2014). Comparison of cost-effectiveness of oral rapamycin plus bare-metal stents versus first generation of drug-eluting stents (from the Randomized Oral Rapamycin in Argentina [ORAR] 3 trial). The American Journal of Cardiology, 113(5), 815–821.
- Head, S. J., Milojevic, M., Daemen, J., Ahn, J. M., Boersma, E., Christiansen, E. H., ... & Kappetein, A. P. (2018). Mortality after coronary artery bypass grafting versus percutaneous coronary intervention with stenting for coronary artery disease: a pooled analysis of individual patient data. The Lancet, 391(10124), 939–948..
- De Luca, G., Algowhary, M., Uguz, B., Oliveira, D. C., Ganyukov, V., Busljetik, O., ... & Verdoia, M. (2023). Age-Related Effects of COVID-19 Pandemic on Mechanical Reperfusion and 30-Day Mortality for STEMI: Results of the ISACS-STEMI COVID-19 Registry. Journal of Clinical Medicine, 12(6), 2116.
- Rodríguez, A. E., Fernandez-Pereira, C., Mieres, J. R., & Rodríguez-Granillo, A. M. (2023). High Non-Cardiac Death Incidence Should Be a Limitation of Drug-Eluting Stents Implantation? Insights from Recent Randomized Data. Diagnostics, 13(7), 1321
