= National Institute of Astrophysics, Optics and Electronics =

Science research institute located in Tonantzintla, Puebla, Mexico

Instituto Nacional de Astrofísica, Óptica y Electrónica
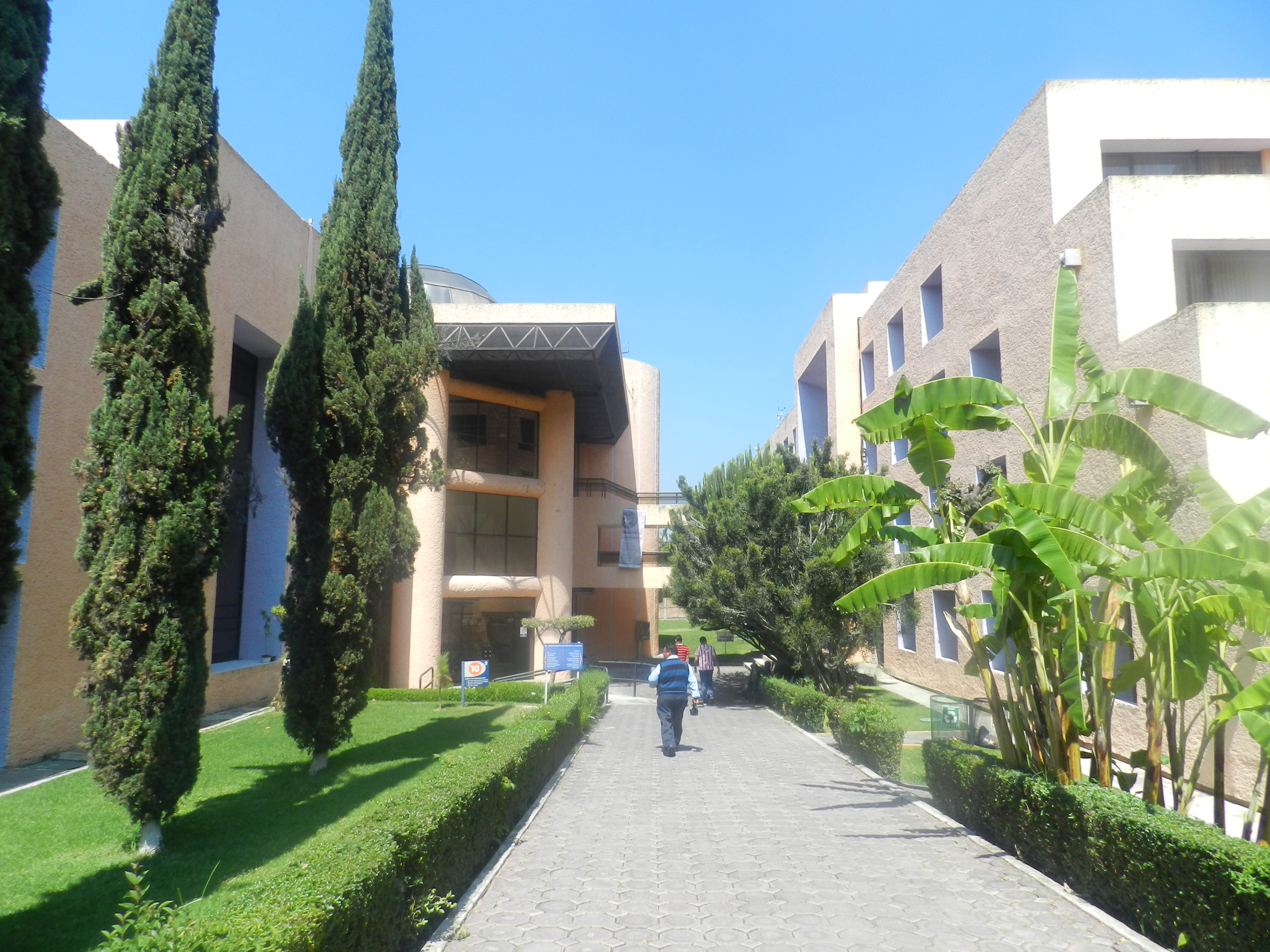
- Type: Public
- Established: 12 November 1971
- Affiliations: CONACyT
- Director: Edmundo Antonio Gutiérrez Domínguez
- Location: Puebla, Mexico; 19.031488°N 98.315348°W
- Colors: Blue and White
- Website: www.inaoep.mx

The National Institute of Astrophysics, Optics and Electronics (in Spanish: Instituto Nacional de Astrofísica, Óptica y Electrónica, INAOE) is a Mexican science research institute located in Tonantzintla, Puebla.

Founded by presidential decree on November 12, 1971, it has over 100 researchers in Astrophysics, Optics, Electronics and Computing Science, with postgraduate programs in these areas. INAOE is one of 30 public research centers sponsored by the National Council of Science and Technology of Mexico (CONACyT).

The institute, in partnership with the University of Massachusetts Amherst, developed the Large Millimeter Telescope / Gran Telescopio Milimétrico on the Puebla-Veracruz border.

The asteroid 14674 INAOE was named after this institute.

== Structure ==
There are four research departments with a number of research groups and laboratories:

=== Astrophysics ===
Coordinator: José Ramón Valdés Parra

Research groups:

- Visible Astronomical Instrumentation Laboratory and of High Energies (Esperanza Carrasco-Licea)
- Millimeter Wavelength Instrumentation Laboratory
- Fourier Spectroscopy Laboratory (Fabián Rosales)
- Photographic Plates Collection (Raquel Díaz Hernández)

=== Computer Sciences ===
Coordinator: Ariel Carrasco Ochoa

Research groups:

- Machine Learning and Pattern Recognition
- Reconfigurable and High Performance Computing
- Ubiquitous Computing and Processing
- Biosignal Processing and Medical Computing
- Robotics
- Language Technologies
- Computer Perception
- Cybersecurity

=== Electronics ===
Coordinator: Alfonso Torres Jacome

Research groups:

- Microelectronics
- Integrated Circuit Design
- Electronic Instrumentation
- Communications

=== Optics ===
Coordinator: Fermín Granados Agustín

Research groups:

- Science Group and Optoelectronics Engineering (CIOE)
- Image-Science Group and Digital Color
- Photonics
- Optics Instrumentation
- Quantum Optics
- Diffractive Optics
- Optoelectronics
- Imaging Science
- Biophotonics
- Optical Communications and Optoelectronics
- Optic Fibers
- Holography
- Imaging and Digital Color
- Optical Instrumentation
- Optical Microscopy and Dimensional Metrology
- Diffractive Optics
- Biomedical Optics
- Thin-films

== See also ==
- University of California High-Performance AstroComputing Center
